= List of schools in Chicago Public Schools =

Chicago Public Schools (CPS) is a large public school district consisting of primary and secondary schools within the city limits of Chicago, in the U.S. state of Illinois.

== Schools ==
=== High schools ===
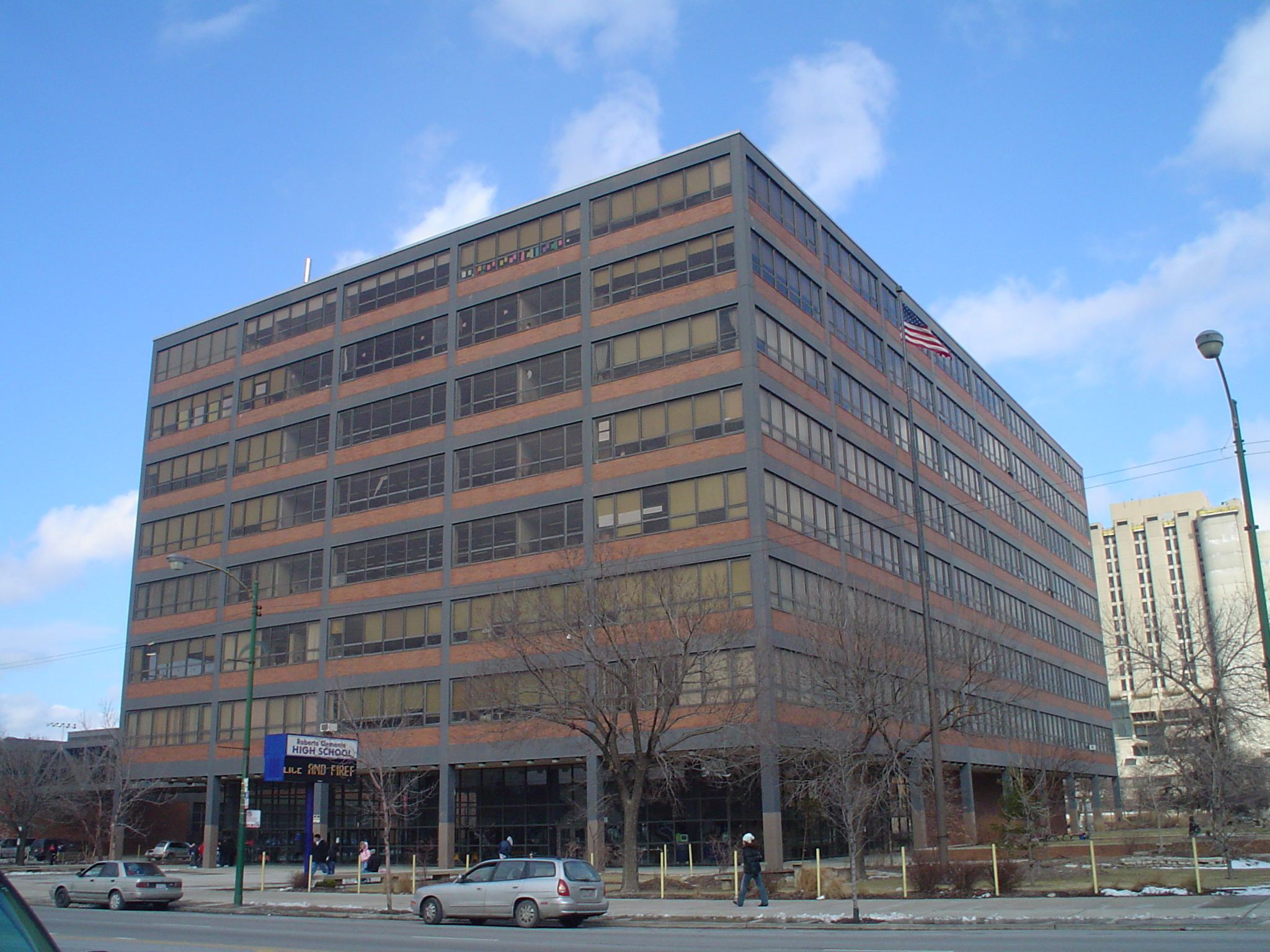
Roberto Clemente Community Academy

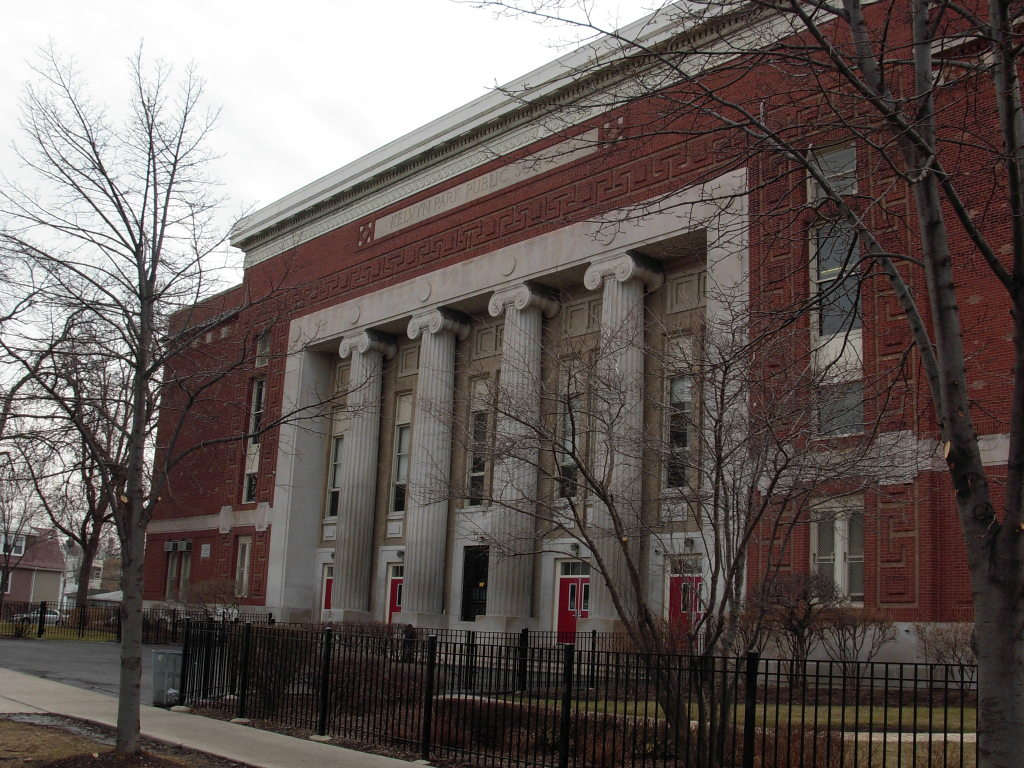
Kelvyn Park High School

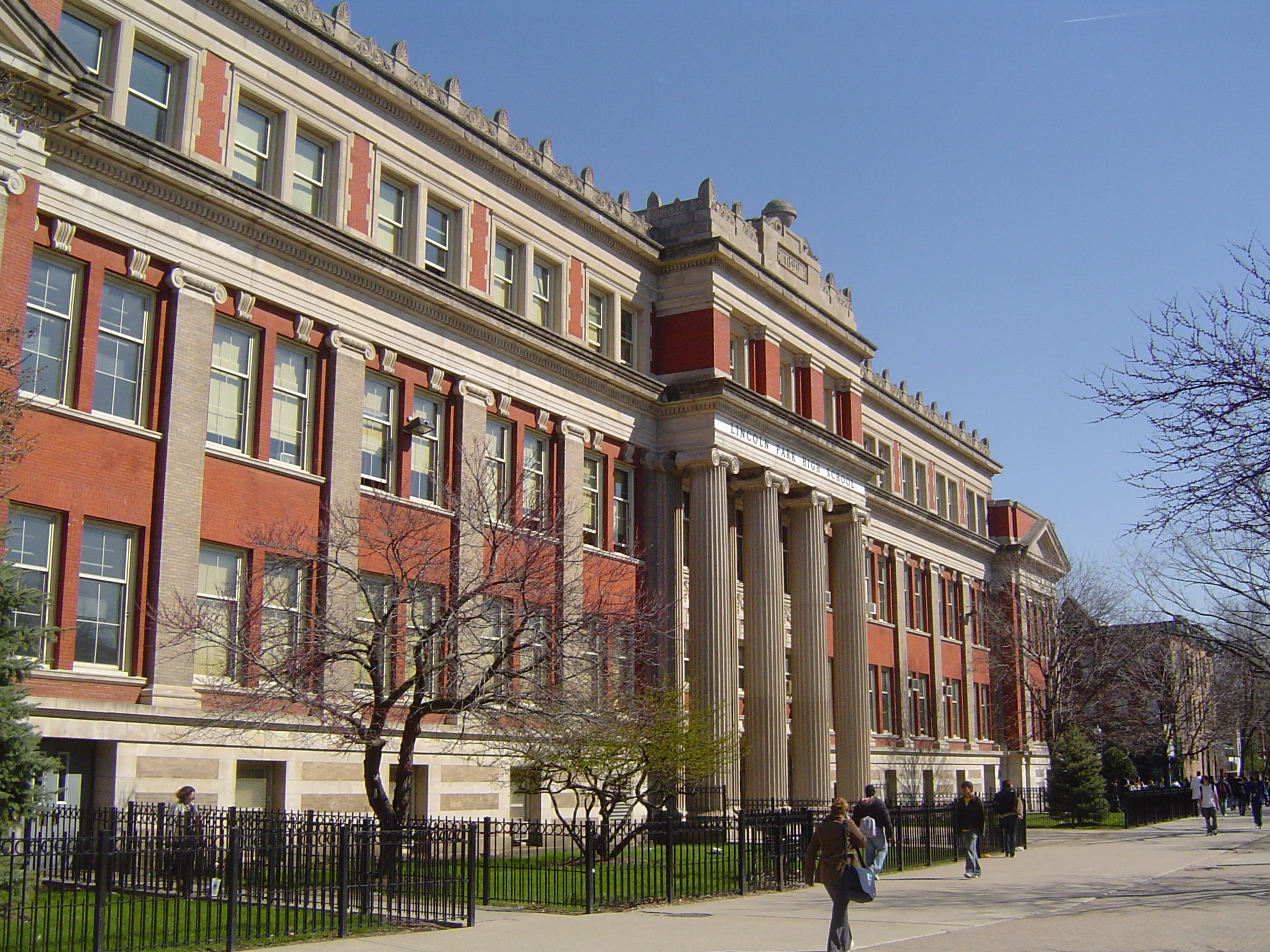
Lincoln Park High School

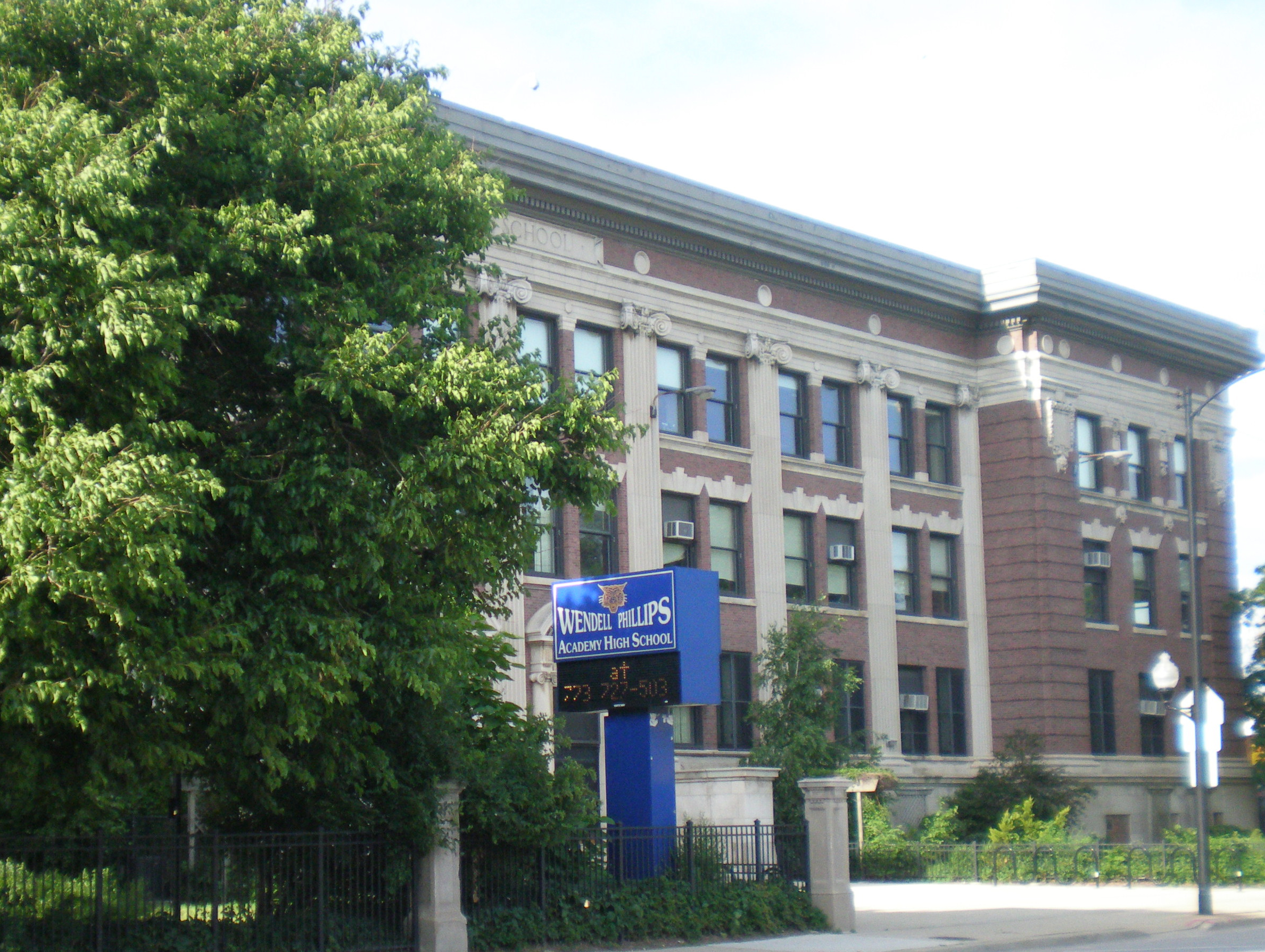
Wendell Phillips Academy High School

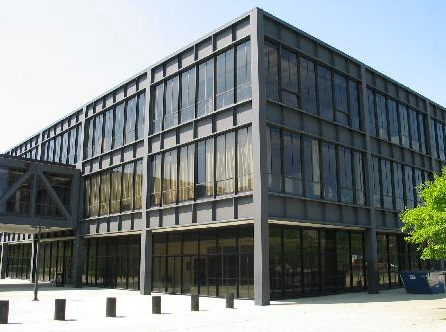
Whitney M. Young Magnet High School

There are several types of high schools in the district, including neighborhood, career academy, charter, contract, magnet, military academy, selective enrollment, small and special education.

==== Alternative Learning Options (ALOP) ====
- Bridgescape Schools
  - Bridgescape Academy Brainerd
  - Bridgescape Academy Humboldt Park
  - Bridgescape Academy Lawndale
  - Bridgescape Academy Roseland

==== Career and Technical Education (CTE) ====
- Louisa May Alcott College Preparatory High School
- Ace Amandla Charter High School
- Amundsen High School*
- Austin Community Academy High School*
- Bogan High School*
- Bowen High School*
- Chicago Vocational Career Academy*
- Roberto Clemente Community Academy*
- Collins Academy High School
- Curie Metropolitan High School*
- Dunbar Vocational Career Academy
- Dyett High School*
- Farragut Career Academy*
- Fenger Academy High School*
- Foreman High School*
- Gage Park High School*
- Hancock High School
- Harlan Community Academy High School*
- Harper High School*
- Hirsch Metropolitan High School*
- Hyde Park Academy High School*
- Jones College Prep High School
- Benito Juarez Community Academy*
- Julian High School*
- Thomas Kelly High School*
- Manley Career Academy High School*
- John Marshall Metropolitan High School*
- Mather High School*
- North Grand High School*
- Wendell Phillips Academy High School*
- Prosser Career Academy
- Al Raby High School
- Richards Career Academy*
- Roosevelt High School*
- Carl Schurz High School*
- Simeon Career Academy
- Solorio Academy High School*
- South Shore International College Preparatory High School
- Roger C. Sullivan High School*
- Uplift Community High School
- George Washington High School
- Wells Community Academy High School
- George Westinghouse College Prep
- Daniel Hale Williams Preparatory School of Medicine
- Little Black Pearl Art and Design Academy

==== Charter ====
- Acero Charter Schools
  - Major Hector P. Garcia MD
  - Victoria Soto
- ASPIRA Charter Schools
  - ASPIRA Business and Finance
  - ASPIRA Early College High School
- Chicago Collegiate Charter School
- Chicago Math and Science Academy
- Chicago International Charter School (CICS)
  - CICS ChicagoQuest North
  - CICS Ralph Ellison
  - CICS Longwood
  - CICS Northtown Academy
- EPIC Academy Charter High School
- Foundations College Preparatory Charter School
- Institutio
  - Instituto Health Sciences Career Academy
  - Instituto - Justice Lozano
- Intrinsic Charter School
- Noble Network of Charter Schools
  - Baker
  - Butler
  - Chicago Bulls
  - Gary Comer
  - DRW
  - Golder
  - Hansberry
  - ITW Speer
  - Johnson
  - Mansueto
  - Muchin
  - Noble Academy
  - Noble Street
  - Pritzker
  - Rauner
  - Rowe-Clark
  - UIC
- Perspectives Charter Schools
- Urban Prep Academies
- Youth Connection Charter School
  - Latino Youth High School
  - West Town Academy
- Young Women's Leadership Charter School of Chicago

==== Citywide-Option ====
- Peace & Education Coalition High School
- Nancy B. Jefferson Alternative High School
- Simpson Academy High School for Young Women
- Consuella B. York Alternative High School

==== Contract ====
- Chicago Excel Academy (Camelot charter)
- Chicago High School for the Arts
- Chicago Technology Academy
- Little Black Pearl Art and Design Academy

==== International Baccalaureate (IB) ====
- Amundsen High School
- Back of the Yards College Preparatory High School
- Benito Juarez Community Academy
- Bogan High School
- Bronzeville Scholastic Institute
- Carl Schurz High School
- Curie Metropolitan High School
- Farragut Career Academy
- George Washington High School
- Hubbard High School
- Hyde Park Academy High School
- Kennedy High School
- Lincoln Park High School
- Morgan Park High School
- Ogden International High School
- Prosser Career Academy
- Roberto Clemente Community Academy
- Senn High School
- South Shore International College Preparatory High School
- Steinmetz College Prep
- Thomas Kelly High School
- Taft High School

==== Magnet ====
- Chicago High School for Agricultural Sciences
- Michele Clark Magnet High School
- Crane Medical Preparatory High School
- Curie Metropolitan High School
- DeVry University Advantage Academy - Grades 11-12, with college credit
- Disney II Magnet High School
- Harlan Community Academy High School (Engineering Program)
- Senn High School (Fine and Performing Arts Program)
- Von Steuben Metropolitan Science Center

==== Military academies ====
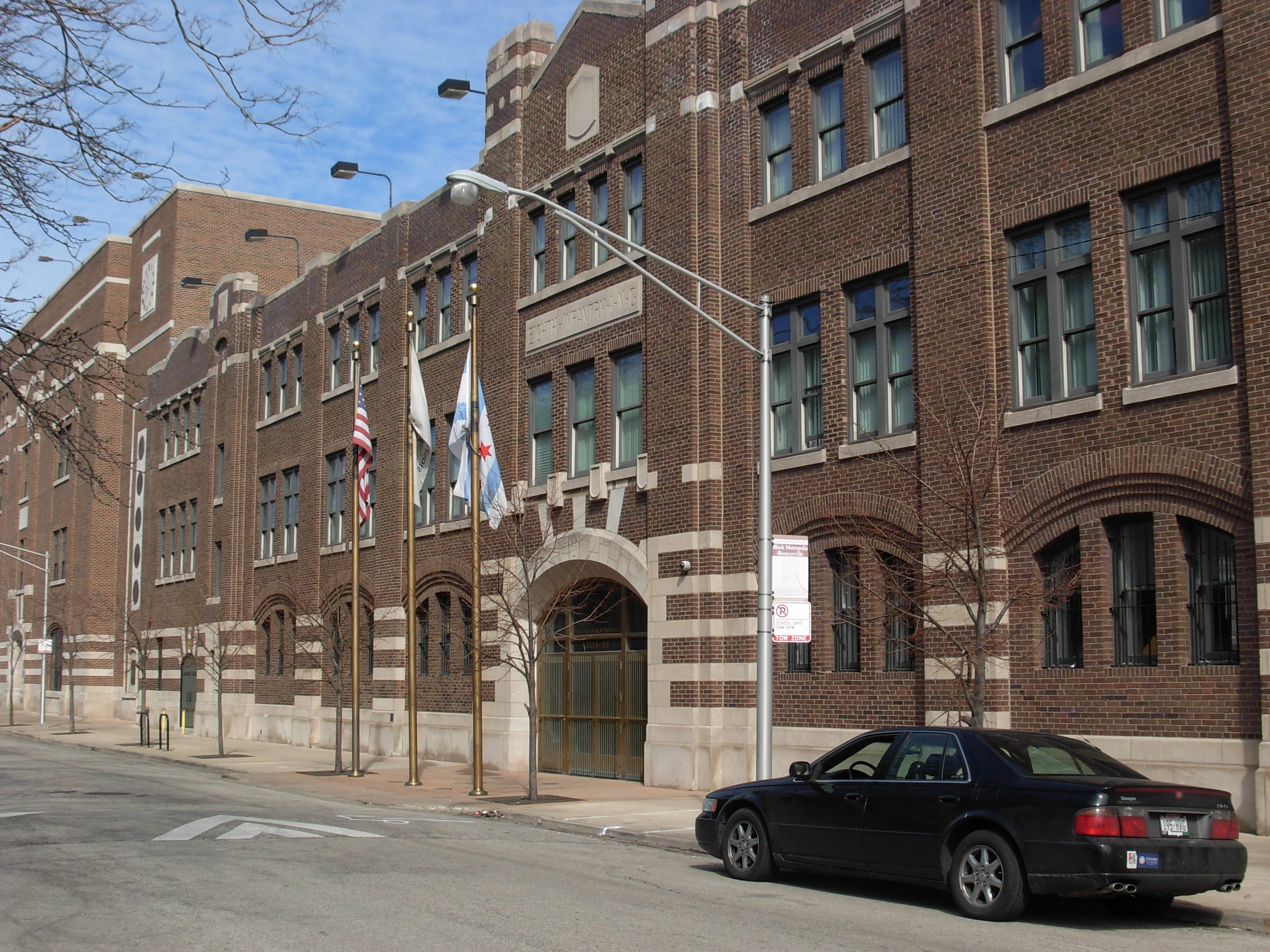
Chicago Military Academy, Bronzeville

- Air Force Academy High School
- Carver Military Academy
- Chicago Military Academy
- Marine Leadership Academy at Ames
- Phoenix Military Academy
- Rickover Naval Academy

==== Neighborhood ====
- Amundsen High School*
- Austin Community Academy High School*
- Bogan High School*
- Bowen High School*
- Chatham Academy High School (no attendance boundaries)
- Corliss High School*
- Douglass Academy High School (no attendance boundaries)
- Dyett High School*
- Englewood Stem High School
- Gage Park High School*
- Harlan Community Academy High School*
- Hirsch Metropolitan High School*
- Infinity Math Science & Technology High School*
- Hubbard High School*
- Kelvyn Park High School*
- Kennedy High School*
- Kenwood Academy*
- Lake View High School*
- Lincoln Park High School*
- Morgan Park High School*
- North Grand High School*
- Orr Academy High School*
- Senn High School*
- Solorio Academy High School*
- Tilden High School*
- George Washington High School*

==== Selective enrollment ====
- George Westinghouse College Prep
- Gwendolyn Brooks College Preparatory Academy
- John Hancock College Preparatory High School
- Jones College Prep High School
- King College Prep
- Lane Technical College Prep High School
- Northside College Preparatory High School
- Robert Lindblom Math & Science Academy
- South Shore International College Preparatory High School
- Walter Payton College Prep
- Whitney M. Young Magnet High School

==== Small ====
- Louisa May Alcott College Preparatory High School
- Austin Community Academy High School
- Bowen High School
- Bronzeville Scholastic Institute
- Chicago Academy High School
- Collins Academy High School
- Al Raby High School
- TEAM Englewood Community Academy

==== Special education ====
- Northside Learning Center High School
- Ray Graham Training Center
- Southside Occupational High School
- Vaughn Occupational High School

=== Elementary/middle schools ===
==== Zoned Middle Schools ====
- Albany Park Multicultural Academy
- Evergreen Academy Middle School
- Eugene Field Elementary School
- Irene C. Hernandez Middle School for the Advancement of Science
- Francisco I. Madero Middle School
- Northwest Middle School
- Robert J. Richardson Middle School
- James Shields Middle School
- Wendell E. Green Elementary School

==== Zoned 3-8 ====
- Joseph E. Gary School website

==== Zoned K-8 ====
===== Zoned K-8 A =====
- Jane Addams School website
- Harriet Tubman School (formerly Louis A. Agassiz) website
- Louisa May Alcott School website
- Ira F. Aldridge School website
- Ariel School (formerly Shakespeare) website
- Phillip D. School Armour website
- George Armstrong School website
- Ashburn School website
- Arthur R. Ashe School website
- John J. Audubon School website
- Avalon Park School website
- Mariano Azuela School website

===== Zoned K-8 B =====
- Alice L. Barnard School website
- Clara Barton School website
- Perkins Bass School website
- Newton Bateman School website
- Jean Baptiste Beaubien School website
- Ludwig Van Beethoven School website
- Jacob Beidler School website
- Hiram H. Belding School website
- "Alexander Graham Bell School". agbellschool.com. Archived from the original on October 5, 2002.
- Belmont-Cragin School website
- Frank I. Bennett School website
- James G. Blaine School website
- Carrie Jacobs Bond School website
- Mosaic School of Fine Arts School (formerly Daniel Boone) website
- Edward A. Bouchet School (formerly Bryn Mawr) website
- Myra Bradwell School website
- Joseph Brennemann School website
- Lorenz Brentano School website
- Norman A. Bridge School website
- Orville T. Bright School website
- Brighton Park School website
- Ronald Brown School (formerly Samuel Gompers) website
- William H. Brown School website
- Milton Brunson School website
- Lyman A. Budlong School website
- Luther Burbank School website
- Edmond Burke School website
- Augustus H. Burley School website
- Daniel Burnham School (formerly Luella) website
- Jonathan Burr School website
- John C. Burroughs School website
- Michael M. Byrne School website

===== Zoned K-8 C =====
- Charles P. Caldwell School website
- Calmeca School website
- Daniel R. Cameron School website
- Marvin Camras School website
- Arthur E. Canty School website
- Lazaro Cardenas School website
- Andrew Carnegie School website
- Carroll/Rosenwald Specialty School website
- Rachel Carson School (formerly Richards Vocational High School) website
- William W. Carter School website
- George Washington Carver School website
- Pablo Casals School website
- George F. Cassell School website
- Willa Cather School website
- Thomas Chalmers School website
- Eliza Chappell School website
- Salmon P. Chase School website
- Cesar E. Chavez School website
- Frederic Chopin School website
- Walter S. Christopher School website
- George Rogers Clark School website
- Henry Clay School website
- Grover Cleveland School website
- DeWitt Clinton School, website
- Henry R. Clissold School website
- Johnnie Colemon School website
- Edward Coles School website
- Columbia Explorers Academy School website
- Christopher Columbus School website
- John W. Cook School website
- John C. Coonley School website
- Peter Cooper School website
- Daniel J. Corkery School website
- Mary E. Courtenay School (formerly Stockton) website
- Sol R. Crown School website
- Paul Cuffe School website
- Countee Cullen School website
- George W. Curtis School website

===== Zoned K-8 D =====
- Richard J. Daley School website
- Charles R. Darwin School website
- Nathan S. Davis School website
- Arthur Dixon Elementary School
- Everett McKinley Dirksen School website
- John C. Dore Elementary School website

===== Zoned K-8 E =====
- Christian Ebinger, Sr. School website
- John F. Eberhart School website

===== Zoned K-8 G =====
- Frank L. Gillespie School website
- Johann von Goethe School website
- Virgil Grissom School website

===== Zoned K-8 H =====
- Charles G. Hammond School website
- Helen M. Hefferan School website
- John Harvard School website
- John Hay School website
- Lionel Hampton Fine & Performing Arts School
- Robert Healy School website

===== Zoned K-8 J =====
- Edward Jenner Academy of the Arts

===== Zoned K-8 L =====
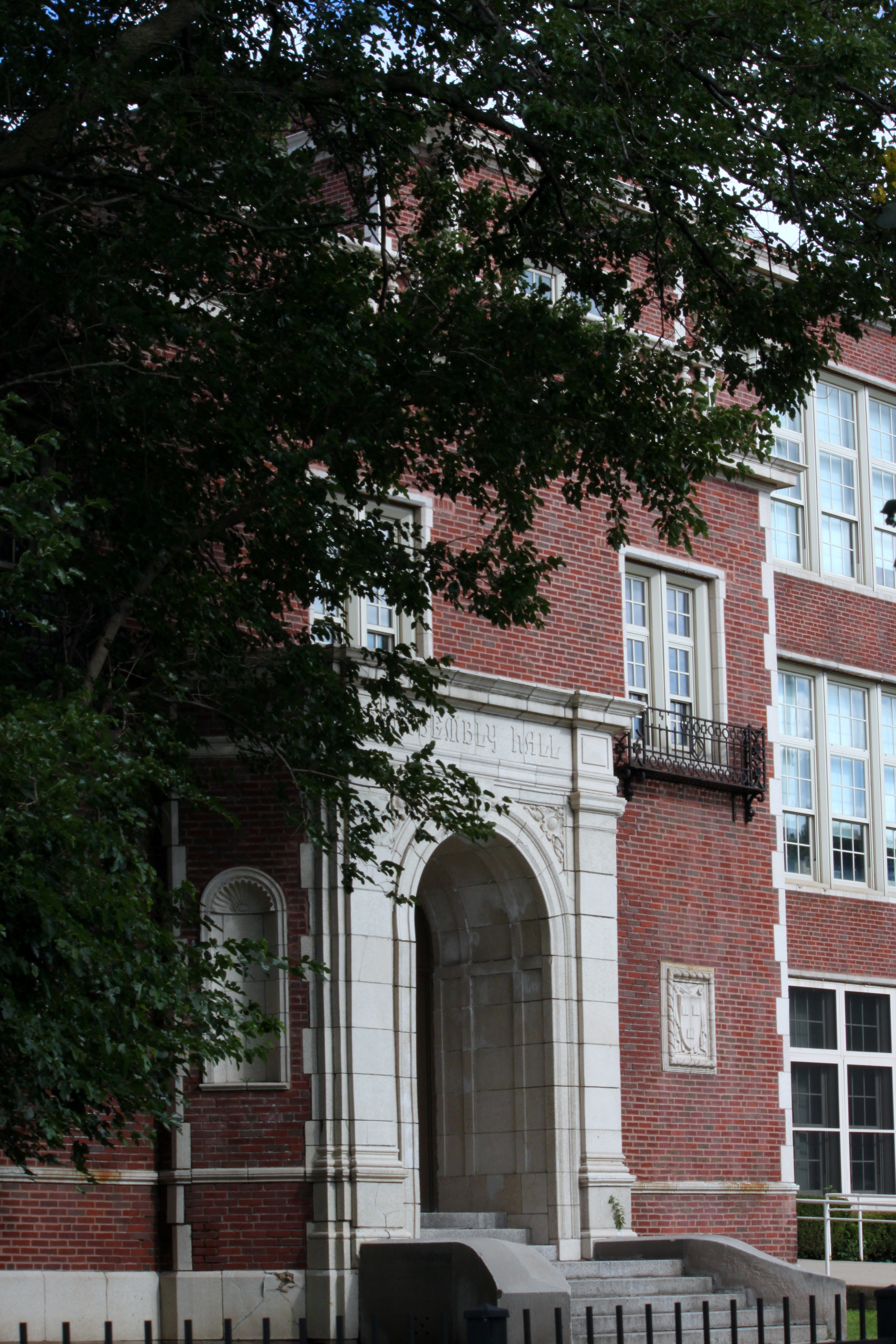
Lenart Regional Gifted Center

- Abraham Lincoln School website
- Carl von Linné School website

===== Zoned K-8 M =====
- Arnold Mireles School website
- George Manierre School website
- Oscar Mayer School website
- Donald L. Morrill School website

===== Zoned K-8 N =====
- Louis Nettelhorst School website
- Walter L Newberry Math & Science Academy website
- Florence Nightingale School website

===== Zoned K-8 O =====
- Ogden International School
- Otis World Language Academy - It was established in 1880 as Armour Street School and became James Otis School in 1901. Mildred E. Chuchut served as principal from 1960 to 1962. At some point a petition circulated that stated that she caused damage to the morale there. It became James Otis World Language Academy in 2006.

===== Zoned K-8 P =====
- Brian Piccolo School (formerly Rezin Orr) website
- Ernst Prussing School website
- Mary G. Peterson Elementary School
- A.N. Prtizker School

===== Zoned K-8 R =====
- Irma C. Ruiz School website
- Ravenswood School website
- Rogers Fine Arts School website

===== Zoned K-8 S =====
- Mark Sheridan Math & Science Academy website
- Mark Skinner Elementary School website
- Washington D. Smyser Elementary School website
- Sidney Sawyer Elementary School website
- Harriet E. Sayre Language Academy website
- South Loop Elementary School website
- Harriet Beecher Stowe Dual Language School, formerly Stowe Elementary School, in West Humboldt, Chicago up to the early 1970s had an entirely white student body. In 1966, it had 1,212 students and 38 teachers. On August 10, 1966, Mildred Chucut became principal after being transferred from Jenner School. By the 1970s, the student population included many Latinx. There were accusations of her disrespecting students, with some groups asking for her removal, much like how accusations were made against her when she was principal at Jenner. She denied the accusations and credited them to agitators trying to install a Latinx principal.
- Elizabeth H. Sutherland Elementary School

===== Zoned K-8 W =====
- Laura S. Ward Elementary School (Humboldt Park)
  - The building was formerly the Martin Ryerson Elementary School. Ryerson School closed in 2013, and Laura Ward, previously in East Garfield Park, was moved to the former Ryerson building, which became the new Ward Elementary building; both school populations merged into one. There were members of the Ryerson community who were afraid that the Ward community would cause violent incidents at their school. Parents of Ryerson did a walkout in protest.

==== Zoned K-7 ====
- Helge A. Haugan School website
- Patrick Henry School website

==== Zoned K-6 ====
- John Barry School website
- Charles S. Brownell School website
- Laughlin Falconer School website
- William G. Hibbard School website
- William P. Nixon School website
- John T. Pirie School website
- Beulah Shoesmith School website
- Woodlawn School website

==== Zoned K-5 ====
- Peter Cooper School website
- Edward Everett School website
- Nathanael Greene School website
- Henry D. Lloyd School website
- Cyrus H. McCormick School website
- Mary McDowell School website
- Socorro Sandoval School website
- Franz Peter Schubert School website
- Enrico Tonti School website

==== Zoned K-4 ====
- New Field School website
- Louis Pasteur School website
- Ferdinand Peck School website
- James Shields School website

==== Zoned K-3 ====
- Jackie Robinson School website

==== Zoned K-2 ====
- Josefa Ortiz De Dominguez School website

=== Elementary/middle schools by type ===
Chicago Public Schools offers a wide variety of choices for elementary school students, including neighborhood, academic centers, charter, classical, contract, international gifted program, magnet, regional gifted center, small and special education.

==== Academic centers ====
Academic centers are housed in high schools and provide a college preparatory program for academically gifted and talented seventh and eighth grade students. There are seven academic centers:

- Brooks
- Kenwood
- Lane
- Lindblom
- Morgan Park
- Taft
- Young

==== Charter Schools ====
- Acero Charter Schools
  - Brighton Park
  - Cisneros
  - Clemente
  - De La Cruz
  - De Las Casas
  - Fuentes
  - Idar
  - Marquez
  - Paz
  - Santiago
  - Tamayo
  - Torres
  - Zizumbo
- ASPIRA Charter Schools
  - Haugen Middle School
- Catalyst Elementary Charter School
  - Circle Rock
  - Maria
- Christopher House Charter School
- Chicago International Charter School
  - Avalon/South Shore
  - Basil
  - Lloyd Bond
  - Bucktown
  - Irving Park
  - Loomis Primary
  - Prairie
  - Washington Park
  - West Belden
  - Wrightwood
- University of Chicago
  - Donoghue Elementary School
  - North Kenwood Oakland

==== Classical schools ====
The instructional program in classical schools is accelerated and highly structured for strong academic achievement in literature, mathematics, language arts, world language, and the humanities. There are seven classical schools:

- Decatur
- Edgar Allan Poe
- McDade
- Skinner North
- Skinner West
- Bronzeville
- Sor Juana

==== International gifted program ====
- Lincoln

=== Magnet schools ===
- Black
- Burnside
- Chicago World Language Academy
- Claremont (Zoned Magnet School)
- Miles Davis
- Disney
- Disney II
- Drummond
- Ericson
- Franklin Fine Arts
- Frazier Prospective
- Galileo
- Gunsaulus
- Hawthorne Scholastic Academy
- Phoebe A. Hearst Fine Arts Magnet School
- Inter-American Magnet School
- Kershaw
- LaSalle
- LaSalle II
- Murray Language Academy
- Newberry
- Owen
- Prescott Magnet Cluster School
- Sabin
- Saucedo
- STEM Magnet Academy
- Stone Academy
- Suder
- Thorp
- Turner-Drew
- Vanderpoel
- Wildwood

==== Regional gifted centers ====
There are eleven regional gifted centers:

- Alexander Graham Bell School
- Beasley
- Beaubien
- Carnegie
- Coonley
- Edison Regional Gifted Center
- Keller Regional Gifted Center
- Lenart Regional Gifted Center
- National Teachers Academy
- Pritzker School
- Pulaski International School
- South Loop

==== Special schools ====
- Daniel C. Beard Elementary (K-3)
- Blair Early Childhood Center
- Wilma Rudolph Elementary Learning Center (K-5)

== Defunct schools ==
=== Former high schools ===
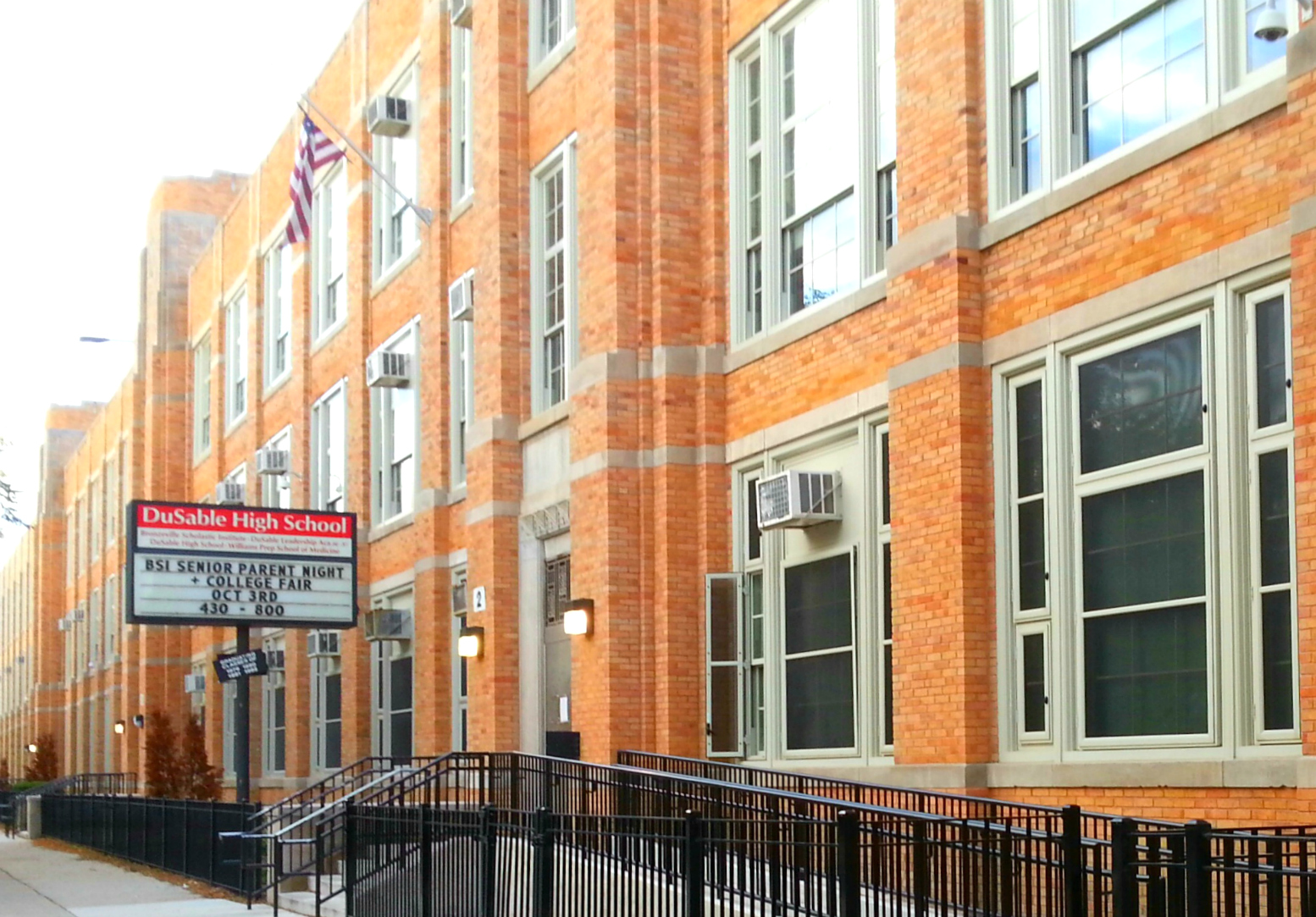
DuSable High School

- Academy of Communications and Technology Charter School - closed in 2010, the school building at 4319 W. Washington Blvd. was built in 1906 as St. Mel Catholic grade school
- Richards Vocational High School - located at 5516 S. Maplewood Ave. Houses Rachel Carson Elementary School since 1991. An annex was built in 1997
- Calumet High School (1919–2006) - made way for the Perspectives Charter School, which occupies the building
- Carter Harrison Technical High School (1912–1983) - houses the Maria Saucedo Scholastic Academy
- Cecil Partee Academic Preparatory Center - occupied the old Hookway Elementary School
- Chicago High School (1856–1880) - renamed Central High School in 1878, closed in 1880; building demolished in 1950 to make way for the Kennedy Expressway
- Chicago Talent Development High School (2009–2014)
- Chicago Virtual Charter School (K–12, 2006–2020)
- Collins High School - the building at 1313 South Sacramento Drive (inside Douglas Park) houses both the Collins Academy High School and the North Lawndale College Prep High School
- Cooley Vocational High School (1958–1982) - subject of the film Cooley High; the school, located on the 800 block of West Scott Street, closed in 1983 when it was replaced by a newer high school nearby and was eventually razed; the area around the former school was zoned to nearby Lincoln Park High School
- Cregier Vocational High School - closed at the end of the 1994-1995 school year
- DuSable High School
- Englewood Technical Prep Academy (1873–2008) - closed due to poor performance; houses TEAM Englewood Community Academy and Urban Prep Charter Academy
- English High and Manual Training School - renamed Crane High School in 1905
- Forrestville High School - closed in 1971 when the nearby King College Prep High School was completed and students were sent there
- Harper High School (1911–2021) – closed in 2021 due to low enrollment, poor performance, and other reasons
- Harvard High School (1865–1962) - closed in 1962 due to declining enrollment; last used by St. George's School before the building was converted into condominiums and a family home
- Hibbard High School - closed in 1927 when the nearby Roosevelt High School was completed and students were sent there; remains in operation as an elementary school
- Jefferson High School - closed in 1910 when the nearby Schurz High School was completed and students were sent there; the school was eventually razed and the Irish American Heritage Center was built on the site
- John Hope College Preparatory High School (no attendance boundaries)
- Kinzie High School - renamed Kennedy High School in 1965
- Lake High School - renamed Tilden Technical High School (the Tilden Career Community Academy) in 1915
- Las Casas Occupational High School (closed 2011)
- Lewis Institute High School - closed in 1917; merged with Armour Institute of Technology in 1940 to form the modern Illinois Institute of Technology
- Loretto High School (Englewood) - closed in 1962 due to declining enrollment; the fate of the building is unknown
- Lucy Flower Vocational High School (1911–2003) - named after Lucy Flower; site of Al Raby School for Community and Environment
- Manual High School - renamed University High School in 1904
- Medill High School - 1300 block of W. 14th place. First built in the 1890s, buildings on that site housed various grades. The high school closed in 1948
- Metropolitan High School - closed during the 1990s; the building, located on 160 block of West Wendell, houses the Ruben Salazar Bilingual Educational Center, a CPS K-8 school
- Near North Career Metro High School - closed in 2001; the building is used as a training facility for the Chicago Police Department and Chicago Fire Department
- North Park University High School - closed in 1969 due to declining enrollment and rising costs; serves as an administration building for an adjacent college
- Parker High School - opened in 1901; closed in 1977 and reopened as Paul Robeson High School
- Pullman Technical High School - closed in 1950 due to budget constraints; continued to operate as a private school until 1997 when it was converted to the Brooks College Preparatory Academy
- Paul Robeson High School - closed in 2018 due to declining enrollment.
- South Division High School - closed in 1905 and reopened as Wendell Phillips Academy High School
- Spalding (1908–2004) - K through 12 school at 1628 W. Washington; building reopened as Hope Institute Learning Academy, a private school with a CPS contract emphasizing services for special-needs children
- Tuley/Northwest Division High School - closed in 1974 to make way for the new Roberto Clemente Community Academy
- Waller/North Division High School - renamed Lincoln Park High School in 1979
- Washburne Trade School - closed in 1993; reopened in 1994 as part of the City Colleges of Chicago before closing again in 1996. The culinary trade program continues as Washburne Culinary Institute of Kennedy-King College. Washburne school building at 3233 W. 31st St., built in 1910 as the Liquid Carbonic Co. factory and housing the school from 1958 until closing, was considered for landmark status as a Prairie School industrial building but suffered a fire in Feb. 2007 and was demolished by 2009. Converted to a vocational training school in 1919, Washburne was home to Chicago trade union apprentice programs; students earned a high school diploma at the same time
- (West Division) McKinley High School - closed 1954, became the site of Chicago Bulls College Prep
- Westcott Vocational High School - renamed Simeon Career Academy in 1964
- Westinghouse Career Academy High School - closed in 2009 to make way for the new George Westinghouse College Prep (selective enrollment) on the 3300 block of West Franklin Blvd.

=== Former middle schools ===
- Canter Middle School - located at 4959 S Blackstone Ave; voted to be closed in 2013, allowed a 1-year reprieve so 8th graders could graduate. Reused by Chicago Public Schools as Kenwood Academic Center.

=== Former elementary schools ===
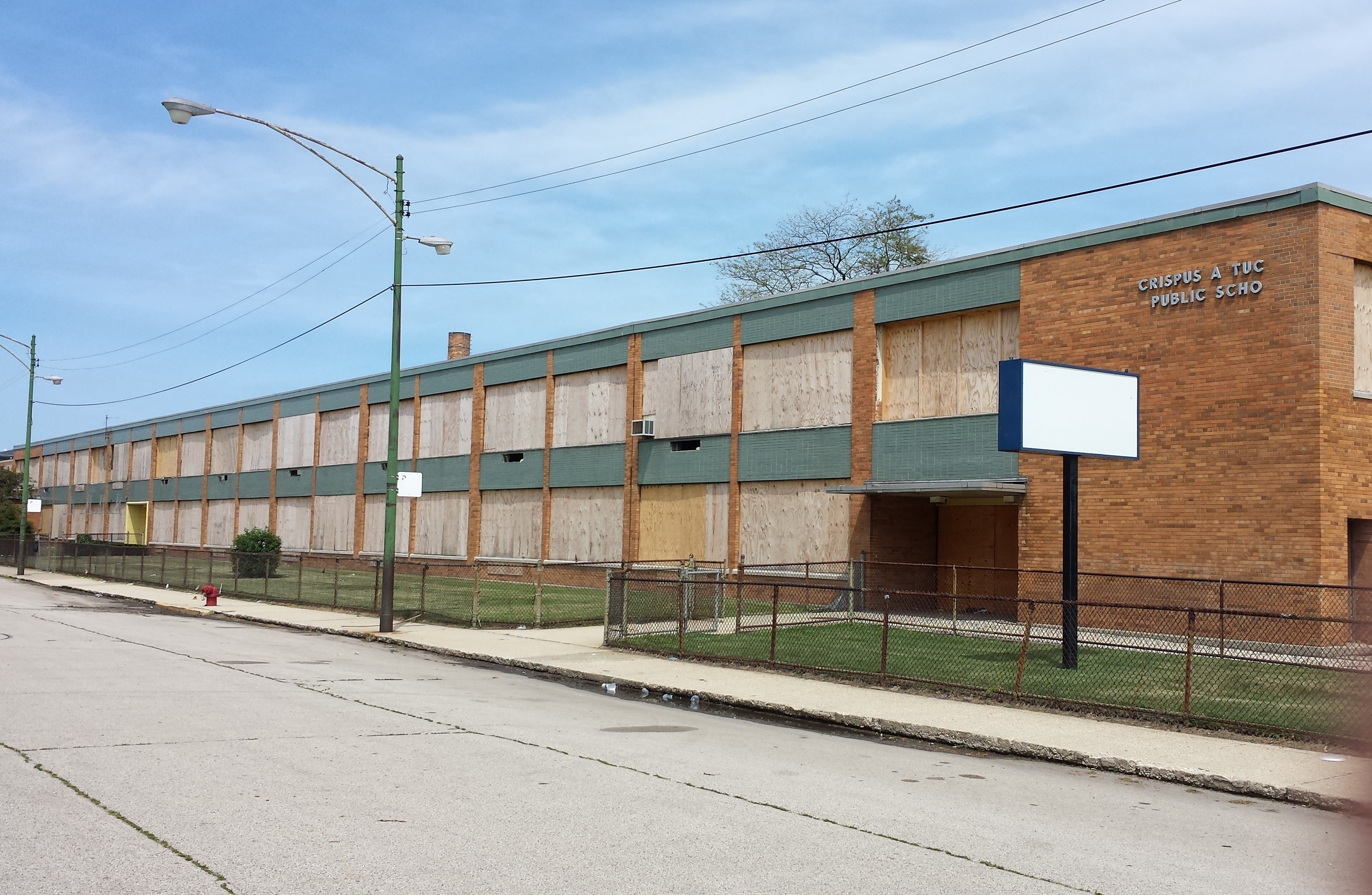
The former Crispus Attucks Elementary School, Bronzeville, Chicago

The former Florence B. Price Elementary School, North Kenwood, Chicago

- R.S. Abbott Elementary School - located at 3630 S. Wells; opened in 1881 and closed in 2008; the building houses Air Force Academy High School
- John P. Altgeld Elementary School - located at 1340 W 71st St.; closed in 2014. Renamed Daniel S. Wentworth Elementary School after moving to the site of this school
- Louis Armstrong Elementary School - located at 5345 W Congress Pkwy; voted to be closed in 2013. The Board of Education approved a sale to Rivers of Living Water Ministries International on April 26, 2017 for $250,000. Slated for use as community center
- Crispus Attucks Elementary School (formerly John Farron Elementary School) - located at 5055 S State St; voted to be closed in 2013, phased out in summer 2015. The Board of Education approved a sale to KMIS Developers on May 24, 2017 for $100,000
  - In 1967 parents demanded the removal of its principal, Mary Jane O'Shea. That year superintendent James F. Redmond transferred her, an action criticized by the Chicago Principals Club.
- Katharine Lee Bates Elementary School - opened in 1960 and closed in 1979; in 1981 Tabernacle Christian Academy moved into that building at 1203 W. 109th Place, and it remains in operation.
- Blair Elementary School - located at 6751 W 63rd Pl; converted into Blair Early Childhood Center.
- Arna W. Bontemps Elementary School - located at 1241 W 58th St.; voted to be closed in 2013. The Board of Education approved a sale to IFF on Jun 28, 2017 for $50,000. School slated to become mixed-use workforce housing development with at least 46 affordable units. Gym will be converted to commercial leased space. Outdoor area will become urban farm. Offer contingent on receipt of low-income housing tax credits from city.
- Kate S. Buckingham School - located at 9207 S. Phillips Ave; voted to be closed in 2013. For sale.
- Ralph J. Bunche Elementary School - located at 6515 S. Ashland Ave; closed in 2005 after graduating its final 8th graders and was renamed Providence Englewood Center.
- Daniel H. Burnham School - located at 1903 E 96th St.; voted to be closed in 2013. For sale, main building and annex are being sold separately
- Calhoun North Elementary School - located at 2833 W Adams St.; voted to be closed in 2013. The Board of Education approved a sale to Heartland Housing on May 24, 2017 for $200,000. Slated for use as affordable housing. Use restriction: Must be used as housing. Gym and auditorium must be preserved and made available for community programming and partnerships. Cannot be used as any kind of K-12 school or for commercial, retail or industrial development. Owner must provide and maintain a playground for neighborhood children. Sale price will also include about $360,000 in donation tax credits
- Zenos Colman Elementary School - located at 4655 S Dearborn St.; closed in 2005. Converted to the School district's Administration office
- Cornell Elementary School - located at 7525 S. Maryland Ave, closed in 1975 and demolished in 1980
- Dodge Elementary School - serves as Chicago Public Schools, Garfield Park Office
- Ana Roque De Duprey School - located at 2620 W Hirsch St.; voted to be closed in 2013. The Board of Education approved sale to IFF Von Humboldt on Jul 22, 2015 for $3,100,000. Main building slated to become mixed-use community for teachers. Annex and adjoining playground to be sold to Puerto Rican Cultural Center for $1 and converted into a day care center
- Farragut Elementary School - Became a Junior High School and then a High School known as Farragut Career Academy
- Froebel Elementary School - Demolished in 1980 for housing
- U.S. Grant Elementary School
- Hardin Elementary School - closed in 1950s, homes built on the site
- Herman Felsenthal Elementary School - Built at a cost of $110,000 in 1901, one of the largest public schools in the city. Demolished in 1983.
- Henry Horner Elementary School - building converted into residential condos in 2013
- Amelia Dunne Hookway Elementary School - closed in 1981 due to underenrollment. A transitional high school for ninth graders, Cecil Partee Academic Preparatory Center was later housed in that building. Partee was later relocated to Chicago Vocational Career Academy. In 1988, Lenart Regional Gifted Center opened a selective admissions elementary school on the site
- George Howland Elementary School - Merged to North Lawndale College Prep Charter High School in 1998
- Jefferson Elementary School became STEM Magnet Academy
- Jirka Elementary School - building converted to Pilsen Community Academy.
- John V. LeMoyne Elementary School (formerly Theodore Herzi Elementary School) - Merged with Inter-American Magnet School
- Lafayette Elementary School - Located at 2714 W. Augusta Boulevard. Became Chicago High School for The Arts in 2015.
- Langland Elementary School - Located at 2230 W. Cortland Street. This school was demolished in 1960 to make way for Ehrler Park
- Longfellow Elementary School - Razed in 1987 to make way for McKinley Branch Library
- Mayfair Elementary School - merged with Irish American Heritage Center in 1985
- Garrett A. Morgan Elementary School - located at 8407 S. Kerfoot. Closed in 2014.
- Moseley Elementary School - Demolished in 2009
- Nathaniel Pope Elementary School - Closed in 2014 as one of 54 school closures
- Florence B. Price Elementary School - Located at 4351 South Drexel Boulevard. Opened in 1964 and closed in 2013 to house a local church
- Raymond Elementary School - reopened as Perspectives/IIT Math & Science Charter Academy
- Jacob Riis Elementary School - demolished in 2008
- Rosenwald Elementary School - Became Carroll-Rosenwald Specialty School after Carroll moved to this school
- Betsy Ross Elementary School - Closed in 2013
- Martin Ryerson Elementary School - Closed in 2013, with Ward Elementary School moving into its building and the Ryerson and Ward populations merged
- Thomas Scanlan Elementary School - (Later renamed Songhai Learning Institute) Closed in 2014
- Shedd Elementary School - located at South Side, Chicago
- Jesse Spalding Elementary School - closed in 2006, merged to Hope Learning Academy
- Spry Elementary School - building was converted into the Spry Community School
- Stewart Elementary School - closed in 2013 for lofts
- Stockton Elementary School - renamed Courtenay Language Arts Center in 2013
- Tennyson Elementary School - closed in 2014
- Alexander von Humboldt Elementary School - located at 2622 West Hirsch Ave. At the beginning of the 2008-2009 school year, Ana Roque de Duprey School moved its operations to the Von Humboldt building
- Willard Elementary School - closed in 1992. homes were built on that site
- Richard Wright Elementary School - opened in 1971 and closed in 2004 due to fire
- Yale Elementary School - closed in 2013

=== Former special schools ===
- Moses Montefiore Academy - closed in 2016

== See also ==
- Chicago Public Schools
- List of high schools in Illinois
- List of school districts in Illinois
