= List of charter schools in Illinois =

The following is a list of charter schools in Illinois (including networks of such schools) grouped by city.

== Chicago ==
- Academy for Global Citizenship
- ACE Amandla Charter School
- Acero Charter School Network
  - Bartolome de las Casas
  - Brighton Park
  - Carlos Fuentes
  - Esmaralda Santiago
  - Jovita Idar
  - Major Hector P. Garcia
  - Octavio Paz
  - Officer Donald J. Marquez
  - PFC Omar E. Torres
  - Roberto Clemente
  - Rufino Tamayo
  - Sandra Cisneros
  - Sor Juana Ines de la Cruz
  - SPC Daniel Zizumbo
  - Victoria Soto
- Art in Motion AIM Charter School
- Asian Human Services-Passages Charter School
- ASPIRA Charter Schools (Business and Finance, Early College Prep, Haugan)
- Barbara A. Sizemore Academy
- Betty Shabazz International Charter School
- Bronzeville Academy Charter School
- The Catalyst Schools (Circle Rock, Maria)
- Chicago Math and Science Academy
- Chicago Collegiate Charter School
- Chicago International Charter School
  - Avalon
  - Basi
  - Bucktown
  - ChicagoQuest
  - Irving Park
  - Lloyd Bond
  - Longwood
  - Loomis Primary
  - Northtown Academy
  - Prairie
  - Ralph Ellison
  - Washington Park
  - West Belden
  - Wrightwood
- Christopher House Charter Elementary School
- EPIC Academy Charter High School
- Erie Charter Elementary School
- Great Lakes Academy Charter Elementary School
- Horizon Science Academy (Belmont, McKinley Park, Southwest)
- Instituto Health Sciences Career Charter Academy
- Instituto Leadership & Justice Academy Charter High School
- Intrinsic Charter School
- KIPP Chicago (Ascend, Bloom, Create, KIPP One)
- Learn Charter Schools (7th, Butler, Campbell, Excel, Hunter Perkins, Middle, South Chicago)
- Legacy Charter Elementary School
- LEGAL Prep Charter Academy
- Locke A Charter School
- Montessori Charter School Englewood
- Moving Everest Charter School
- Namaste Charter School
- Noble Network of Charter Schools
  - Baker College Prep
  - Butler College Preparatory High School
  - Chicago Bulls College Prep
  - DRW College Prep
  - Gary Comer College Prep
  - Golder College Prep
  - Hansberry College Prep
  - ITW David Speer Academy
  - Johnson College Prep
  - Mansueto High School
  - Muchin College Prep
  - Noble Academy
  - Noble Street College Prep
  - Pritzker College Prep
  - Rauner College Prep
  - Rowe-Clark Math & Science Academy
  - UIC College Prep
- North Lawndale College Prep High School
- Perspectives Charter Schools (HS of Technology, IIT, Joslin, Leadership, Middle)
- Polaris Charter Academy
- Providence-Englewood Elementary Charter School
- Rowe Elementary School
- University of Chicago Charter School (Donoghue, North Kenwood, Woodlawn)
- Urban Prep Academies (Bronzeville, Englewood, West)
- Youth Connections Charter High Schools
  - Ada S. McKinley Lakeside
  - ASA – Community Services West
  - Antonia Pantoja – Aspira
  - Austin Career Education Center
  - CCA – Community Services West
  - Chatham Academy
  - Charles Houston
  - Community Youth Development Institute
  - Dr. Pedro Albizu Campos High School
  - El Cuarto Año – Association House
  - Howard Area Alternative
  - Innovations High School
  - Jane Addams High School
  - Latino Youth High School – Pilsen Wellness Center
  - Olive – Harvey Middle College
  - Options Laboratory School
  - Sullivan House
  - Truman Middle College
  - Westside Holistic Leadership Academy
  - West Town Academy
  - YCCS Virtual High School / Stride, Inc. at Malcolm X College
  - Youth Connection Leadership Academy

== Decatur ==
- Robertson Charter School

== East St. Louis ==
- SIU Charter School of East St. Louis

== Elgin ==
- Elgin Math & Science Academy Charter School

== Grayslake ==
- Prairie Crossing Charter School

== Great Lakes ==
- LEARN 6 Charter School
- LEARN 10 Charter School

== Normal ==
- YBMC Charter School

== Peoria ==
- Quest Charter School Academy

== Pingree Grove ==
- Cambridge Lakes Charter School

== Richton Park ==
- Southland College Preparatory Charter High School

== Rockford ==
- Galapagos Rockford Charter School
- Jackson Charter School
- Legacy Academy of Excellence Charter School

== Springfield ==
- Springfield Ball Charter School

== Waukegan ==
- LEARN 9 Charter School
