= Chicago Public High School League =

American athletic league

- Conference: IHSA
- No. of teams: 180
- Region: Chicago, Illinois

Jahlil Okafor's last Chicago Public High School League basket against Cliff Alexander in the 2014 championship game

The Chicago Public High School Athletic Association, commonly known as the Chicago Public League (CPL), is the interscholastic competition arm of the Chicago Public Schools. The governance of the CPL is set through the Department of Sports Administration and Facilities of CPS.

== Members ==
School	Town	Team name	Colors
ACE Amandla	Chicago	Bobcats	
Agricultural Science	Chicago	Cylones	
Air Force	Chicago	Falcons	
Alcott	Chicago	Wildcats	
Amundsen	Chicago	Vikings	
ASPIRA B&F	Chicago	Tigers	
ASPIRA Early College	Chicago	Pumas	
Austin	Chicago	Tigers	
Back of the Yards	Chicago	Bobcats	
Baker	Chicago	Bobcats	
Bogan	Chicago	Bengals	
Bowen	Chicago	Boilermakers	
Brooks	Chicago	Eagles	
Bulls	Chicago	Bulls	
Butler	Chicago	Lynx	
Carver Military	Chicago	Challengers	
Catalyst Maria	Chicago	Wolves	
Chicago Academy	Chicago	Cougars	
Chicago Collegiate	Chicago	Lions	
Chicago Math & Science	Chicago	Titans	
Chicago Military	Chicago	Eagles	
Chicago Tech	Chicago	Panthers	
Chicago Vocational	Chicago	Cavaliers	
CICS-Ellison	Chicago	Lions	
CICS-Longwood	Chicago	Panthers	
CICS-Northtown	Chicago	Pumas	
Clark	Chicago	Eagles	
Clemente	Chicago	Wildcats	
Collins	Chicago	Warriors	
Comer	Chicago	Catamounts	
Corliss	Chicago	Trojans	
Crane	Chicago	Cougars	
Cruz	Chicago	Dragons	
Curie	Chicago	Condors	
Disney II	Chicago	Titans	
Douglass	Chicago	Tigers	
DRW	Chicago	Cheetahs	
Dunbar	Chicago	Mightymen	
DuSable	Chicago	Panthers	
Dyett	Chicago	Eagles	
Englewood STEM	Chicago	Panthers	
EPIC	Chicago	Legends	
Excel-Englewood	Chicago	Bulls	
Excel-Roseland	Chicago	Bears	
Excel-South Shore	Chicago	Broncos	
Excel-Southwest	Chicago	Bulldogs	
Farragut	Chicago	Admirals	
Fenger	Chicago	Titans	
Foreman	Chicago	Hornets	
Gage Park	Chicago	Owls	
Garcia	Chicago	Patriots	
George Washington	Chicago	Patriots	
Golder	Chicago	Panthers	
Goode	Chicago	Knights	
Hancock	Chicago	Eagles	
Hansberry	Chicago	Bengals	
Harlan	Chicago	Falcons	
Hirsch	Chicago	Huskies	
Horizon-Southwest	Chicago	Huskies	
Hubbard	Chicago	Greyhounds	
Hyde Park	Chicago	Thunderbirds	
IIT Math & Science	Chicago	Wolves	
Instituto	Chicago	Phoenix	
Intrinsic	Chicago	Mustangs	
Johnson	Chicago	Pumas	
Jones	Chicago	Eagles	
Juarez	Chicago	Eagles	
Julian	Chicago	Jaguars	
Kelly	Chicago	Trojans	
Kelvyn Park	Chicago	Panthers	
Kennedy	Chicago	Crusaders	
Kenwood	Chicago	Broncos	
King	Chicago	Jaguars	
Lake View	Chicago	Wildcats	
Lane Tech	Chicago	Champions	
Lincoln Park	Chicago	Lions	
Lindblom	Chicago	Eagles	
Little Village	Chicago	Phoenix	
Manley	Chicago	Wildcats	
Mansueto	Chicago	Leopards	
Marine Leadership	Chicago	Bulldogs	
Marshall	Chicago	Commandos	
Mather	Chicago	Rangers	
Morgan Park	Chicago	Mustangs	
Muchin	Chicago	Panthers	
Noble Street	Chicago	Golden Tigers	
North Grand	Chicago	Eagle-Owls	
North Lawndale	Chicago	Phoenix	
Northside	Chicago	Mustangs	
Ogden	Chicago	Owls	
Orr	Chicago	Spartans	
Payton	Chicago	Grizzlies	
Perspectives	Chicago	Warriors	
Perspective-Joslin	Chicago	Panthers	
Phillips	Chicago	Wildcats	
Phoenix Military	Chicago	Firebirds	
Prosser	Chicago	Falcons	
Pritzker	Chicago	Jaguars	
Raby	Chicago	Raiders	
Rauner	Chicago	Wildcats	
Richards	Chicago	Warriors	
Rickover Naval	Chicago	Sea Dragons	
Roosevelt	Chicago	Rough Riders	
Rowe-Clark	Chicago	Masai Lions	
Schurz	Chicago	Bulldogs	
Senn	Chicago	Bulldogs	
Simeon	Chicago	Wolverines	
Solorio	Chicago	Sun Warriors	
Soto	Chicago	Wolves	
South Shore	Chicago	Tars	
Spry	Chicago	Spartans	
Steinmetz	Chicago	Silver Streaks	
Sullivan	Chicago	Tigers	
Taft	Chicago	Eagles	
Tilden	Chicago	Blue Devils	
UC Woodlawn	Chicago	Warriors	
UIC	Chicago	Firecats	
Uplift	Chicago	Titans	
Urban Prep-Bronzeville	Chicago	Lions	
Urban Prep-Englewood	Chicago	Lions	
Von Steuben	Chicago	Panthers	
Wells	Chicago	Raiders	
Westinghouse	Chicago	Warriors	
Young	Chicago	Dolphins	

== History ==
Origins of the Chicago Public League can be traced back to its predecessor, the Cook County High School League, which started during 1889-90. Some of the schools that participated in the Cook County League still exist today: Crane (as English High and Manual Training), Englewood, Lincoln Park (as North Division), Hyde Park, Phillips (as South Division), Calumet, Marshall, Austin, Lake (now Tilden), and Lake View. Three other schools from this League have since gone to other leagues around the area: University High, which plays in the Independent League; and Lyons Township High of LaGrange and Oak Park–River Forest High, both of which now play in the West Suburban Conference.

The Chicago Public High School League was formed in the summer of 1913, when the Cook County High School League broke apart as a result of the Chicago Board of Education's desire to be responsible for a league in which all the schools would be under its jurisdiction. The suburban schools joined by University High formed the Suburban League (Chicago area).

In the first 15 years of the Public league's history a full plethora of sports were offered. The dominant powers were such traditional powers as Hyde Park, Lane Tech, Crane Tech, Englewood, joined by new powers Senn, Lindblom, Schurz, and Tilden Tech. The mid-1920s saw the adoption of such exotic sports as gymnastics, rifle marksmanship, fencing, indoor golf, and speed skating, but none of these sports ever attracted more than a small percentage of the schools.

During the 1920s, the Chicago Public League, which had unofficially abided by the Illinois High School Athletic Association (IHSAA) ban on all girls interscholastic contests, began to relax its strictures against interscholastic sports for girls. The league in 1922 began sponsoring tennis, golf, and swimming competition, and became lax in its ban on the other sports, so that the girls began interschool competition in basketball, volleyball, and softball. However, when the CPL schools began joining the IHSAA in 1926 (so as to participate in the state golf, tennis, and track and field contests, in which the IHSAA that year assumed joint sponsorship with the University of Illinois) the league then ended its sponsorship of girls' golf, tennis, and swimming, and cracked down on girls' interscholastic contests in the other sports. The CPL did not return to girls' interscholastics until the early 1970s, with the passage of Title IX by the federal government in 1972.

Beginning with the Great Migration coming in the 1920s, a number of schools became predominantly African-American, notably Phillips (started as South Division), DuSable (started as New Phillips), Dunbar, Forrestville (now King), Carver; and later into the second half of the 20th century with Julian, Simeon, Curie, Orr, and Kennedy.

The advent of charter schools in the late 1990s and early 2000s yet saw another expansion of the league as schools such as CICS, Noble Network of Charter Schools, and ACE Technical Charter High School were included. The CPL as it stands today is very diverse with nearly every major nationality and race represented in all sports.

== Administration ==
The CPL is headed by the Director of Sports Administration and Facilities of the Chicago Public Schools. Calvin Davis currently holds this position. Davis, who has 25 years of teaching, coaching, and administrative experience in the Chicago Public Schools took over in 2003 after being selected by CEO Arne Duncan to replace Dr. J.W. Smith who retired that year. Under the Director are the City Wide Sport Coordinators, who govern competition in the sports that they are assigned. Some coordinators handle multiple sports: one example is Mickey Pruitt, a graduate of Robeson and former member of the Chicago Bears. Pruitt currently governs competition in football, wrestling and lacrosse.

David Rosengard currently serves as the Executive Director of Sports Administration for Chicago Public Schools.

== Basic playing levels ==
Nearly every sport has four playing levels: Varsity, Sophomore, Freshman and Elementary. Incoming freshmen can 'play-up' to either sophomore or varsity levels; the same with sophomores for the varsity. The elementary school sports program which offers 17 sports for girls and boys in grades five through eight for 500 schools was developed in the late 1990s by the league as a way to close the athletic gap between the CPL and its parochial counterpart, the Chicago Catholic League/Girls Catholic Athletic Conference. Today, coaches in the high school sector of the CPL actively recruit the elementary division to fill their ranks, as opposed to earlier years where most kids came into the high school athletic arena with little or no experience.

== "The Shield" ==
The championship trophy of the CPL is noted by "The Shield". A school holding one of these trophies is recognized as having beaten a very large field of competitors for the city title. Until 2004, the trophy was made of wood with either a gold or silver plate notating champion or runner-up finish. Since 2004, it is now made of black marble with gold trimming and plated with a silver sculpture of the sport the trophy was earned in. Between 1972 and 2002, the holder of The Shield gained automatic entry into the Illinois State Finals in most sports (except football). Since then, the city championship has been decided prior to the start of the state tournament.

Another reason schools play for The Shield is the venues that they play in. Every year The Shield is contested in a number of professional or major college stadiums. Over the years they have included Soldier Field, the UIC Pavilion, United Center, International Amphitheater, Chicago Coliseum, Chicago Stadium, Wrigley Field, Comiskey Park-US Cellular Field, Loyola University Chicago, Chicago State University, Northeastern Illinois University, and DePaul University.

== Athletic divisions ==
With the exception of soccer, football, girls basketball and baseball, each sport in the CPL has two distinct playing divisions: Red and Blue. The Red division is considered the highest level of competition citywide, while the Blue features programs just starting or not quite as talented. In soccer, there are 4 divisions: Premier, 1st Division, 2nd Division, and 3rd Division respectively. In football, there are three divisions: the Illini (red) Conference, the Chicago (blue) Conference and the Intra-City (green) Conference. In baseball, various divisions are notated by the names of famous major league baseball players, with the highest competition division being the Jackie Robinson conference. In girls' basketball, there are three divisions: Red, Blue, and Green.

=== Football ===
CPL sanctioning of football dates back to 1913. As early as 1927, the CPL football champion met the CCL champion at Soldier Field for the city title. The game would be later dubbed the Chicago Prep Bowl in 1934 by Mayor Edward Kelly as a Thanksgiving fundraiser for the city's poor. Until the advent of the Illinois state playoffs in 1974, the Prep Bowl was the main attraction of the fall season, attracting crowds in upwards of 100,000 in its heyday and averaging close to 65,000. Since 1974, crowds have dramatically dwindled with the emphasis switching to earning a state championship. Renovation of Soldier Field in 2003 has seen a steady resurgence in crowds for the game, averaging around 20-25,000.

Success in the state playoffs for the Public League has been fleeting at times, but since elementary football came on board in the late 1990s, the league has seen considerable progress in competing with outside competition. Between 1979 - when the League first gained entry into the state playoffs - and 1983, at least one Chicago Public school earned a state semifinal berth, with Robeson making it all the way to the Class 6A championship in 1982 before losing to (Rockford) Guilford. Since 1983, only three schools have made it to the state semifinals: Morgan Park (2005), Hubbard (2000, 2006) and Simeon (2014). On November 27, 2015, Phillips became the first Chicago Public school to win an Illinois state title with a 51-7 win over Belleville Althoff to win the Class 4A state championship.

On the city level, football has been long dominated by schools south of Madison Avenue, but north side powers like Lane and Schurz have also hoisted The Shield as league titleholders. As of the end of the 2006 season, Chicago Vocational holds the record for most football city titles with nine, with Lane and Julian tied for second with eight. In addition, the advent of the Chicago Conference Championship game in 2004 has given the second division an opportunity to earn at least one piece of hardware before being seeded into the Prep Bowl tournament. The Intra-City Conference championship is the only title that that division can attain, having no opportunity to vie for the Varsity or State championships.

As recent as 2009, due to the explosion of new high schools in the league, changes in state qualification have now allowed the division champions in the Chicago Conference to also participate in the state tournament, which means at least eight CPS programs will battle in the Downstate Dance. The Intra-City Conference still cannot vie for either a state or city title.

=== Basketball ===
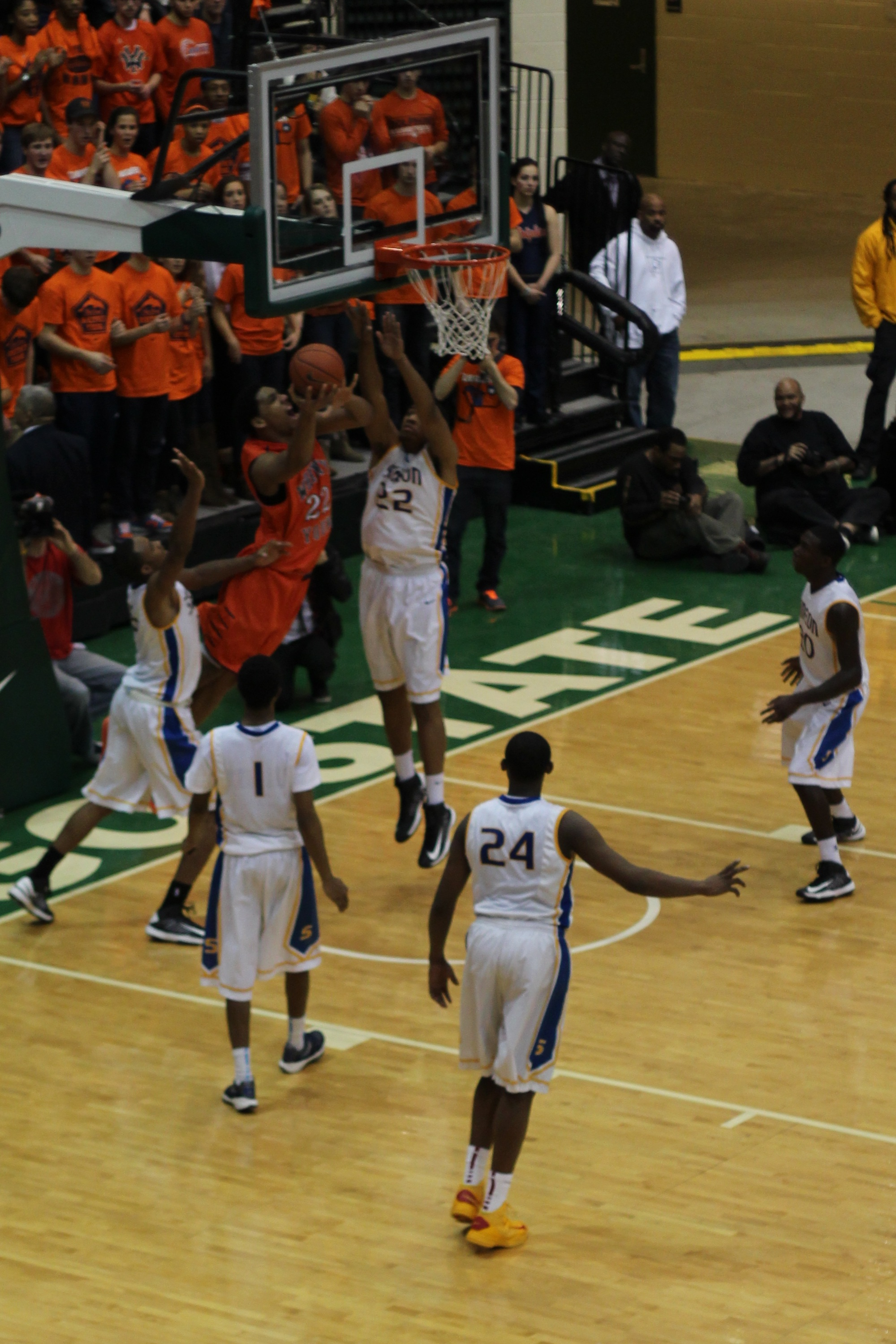
Jahlil Okafor in a baseline drive against Jabari Parker and Russell Woods in a Chicago Public High School League game. (January 26, 2013)

CPL sanctioning of basketball dates back to 1913, when the CPL was formed. The CPL didn't play for a state championship until the 1926-27 school year, when it first gained entry into the IHSA. The basketball ranks have enjoyed the most success at the state tournament of any sport sanctioned by CPS. The first state title for CPL basketball came in 1958 with Marshall, four years after Du Sable earned the league's first ever state championship berth. Beginning in 2010 Simeon won the state championship four times in a row. CPL schools have enjoyed the top of the podium 22 times, 14 of those on the boys side. Eight of the ten girls' titles also belong to Marshall, thanks to the state's all-time winningest coach in the sport, Dorothy Gaters, who at last count was near 830 wins for her career after winning the state championship in class 3A in 2008 along with the Whitney Young girls team who won the class 4A state title in the first year of the class expansion from 2 classes to 4.

Among the stadiums used to stage the city championship were the Chicago Coliseum, International Amphitheater, the UIC Pavilion, and recently the United Center. When the boys championship was contested for the first time at the United Center in 2000, the league set a new state attendance record in basketball as 20,002 patrons watched Westinghouse earn the crown against Whitney Young. To date, every championship game that was held at the United Center earned more fans than the present state championship sites of Carver Arena in Peoria and Redbird Arena in Bloomington combined. As of the 2010-11 school year, the Jones Convocation Center at Chicago State University is the current host of the CPS basketball title games.

The most city basketball championships for boys is a dead heat as Crane and Marshall each have 11 Shields. There's no question who is the top team in the girls' ranks: Marshall, with 23 championships - the most by a single sports team (boys or girls) in league history.

=== Baseball ===
CPL sanctioning of baseball goes back to the spring of 1914, and it entered the state tournament when that was formed in 1940. The league has had its share of state titles, with Lane, Fenger, Schurz and Hubbard taking their place atop the podium. The last state title earned by the CPL was 1973 (Hubbard); since then, the closest the league has come to a state championship was Fenger's second-place finish in 1986.

A tradition that has been a staple of the CPL baseball ranks has been the city title game played in either of the major league stadiums, Wrigley Field or Rate Field (formerly Comiskey Park).

Lane Tech has the most city titles in the sport of any school, having won its 24th title in 2022. It is the most titles for any sports team in league history.

=== Other sports ===
Between 1972 and 2002, the CPL had enjoyed status as sending its city champion to the Illinois State Finals in numerous other sports, including soccer, wrestling and softball. Prior to 1972, the Lane boys' swim team enjoyed nine state titles in the 1930s and 1940s, the earliest domination of any sport by any CPL team. Jones College Prep in 2012 and Lane in 1963 earned the only state cross country titles; Englewood earned runner-up status in 1955. Harrison earned the city's first boys' state soccer title in 1973 and Schurz finished second in 1977; Lake View finished fourth in 2008. Mather ended the city's state championship drought by winning the title in the fall of 2011.

In girls soccer Lane has dominated winning the CPL Girls Soccer Championship Final 16 times since the league began in 1994.

Parker and Senn earned boys' state tennis titles during the 1930s and 1940s.

Walter Payton Girls Volleyball finished fourth in state in 2008.

State track and field titles have come in bunches for the CPL. The earliest known state track championship for a Chicago school dates to 1895 with Englewood. Since then, Hyde Park, Phillips, Lane, Senn, Tilden, Harlan, South Shore, and Morgan Park have earned the gold medal at the state championships.

Also, Tilden earned a pair of state wrestling titles for the city in 1946 and 1952.

Most recently, CPS wrestling has gained notoriety with Bowen racking up regional titles. The last individual state champions have been Travis Hammons of Hubbard (2005) and Max Schneider of Lane Tech (2009, 2012).

=== Sports Apparel ===
There are many websites and other sources to get school apparel. Going to the school directly or if some schools offer it the school webpage, is one source to get school or team apparel. However, an unofficial online source is the CPS fan store.

== See also ==
- List of Chicago Public Schools stadiums

== Sources ==
- Illinois High School Association homepage
- Prep Bowl.com homepage
