= Muchin =

Muchin may refer to:

- Jacqueline Mates-Muchin, the first Chinese-American rabbi in the world
- Muchin College Prep, a public four-year charter high school located in the Chicago Loop in Chicago, Illinois, United States
- Katten Muchin Rosenman, an American law firm formed in 2002 through the merger of Chicago-based Katten Muchin & Zavis (founded in 1974) and New York City-based Rosenman & Colin (founded in 1912)
