= Noble-Relay Teaching Residency =

Graduate teaching program in Illinois, USA

The Noble-Relay Teaching Residency is a two-year teaching program offered through the Relay Graduate School of Education in which residents are placed in a campus within the Noble Network of Charter Schools. Second year residents transition into a full-time paid teaching position and have the opportunity to earn a Masters of Arts in Teaching. Eligible graduate students can receive teaching state licensure from Illinois State Board of Education (ISBE).
