= Academy of Our Lady (Chicago) =

Location
- 1309 West 95th Street; Chicago, Cook County, Illinois 60643; United States; 41.720200°N 87.656308°W

Information
- Funding type: Private school
- Religious affiliation: Catholic
- Opened: 1875
- Closed: 1999

Academy of Our Lady, also known as Longwood Academy, was a school in the Chicago, Illinois from 1875 to 1999.

It was co-ed until 1892, and a girls' school afterwards; took boarding students until 1935; and had a grade school program until 1950, after which it was only a high school. It opened as Academy of Our Lady of the Sacred Heart in 1875. The name was changed to Institute of Our Lady of the Sacred Heart in 1886 and to Academy of Our Lady in 1898. The campus is at 1309 West 95th Street at Throop Street the Washington Heights community area, and now houses Chicago International Charter School, Longwood.

== Notable alumni ==
- Elizabeth Dilling – 1912, writer and political activist.
- T'Keyah Crystal Keymáh – 1981, actress and singer.
