= George Conditt IV =

American basketball player (born 2000)

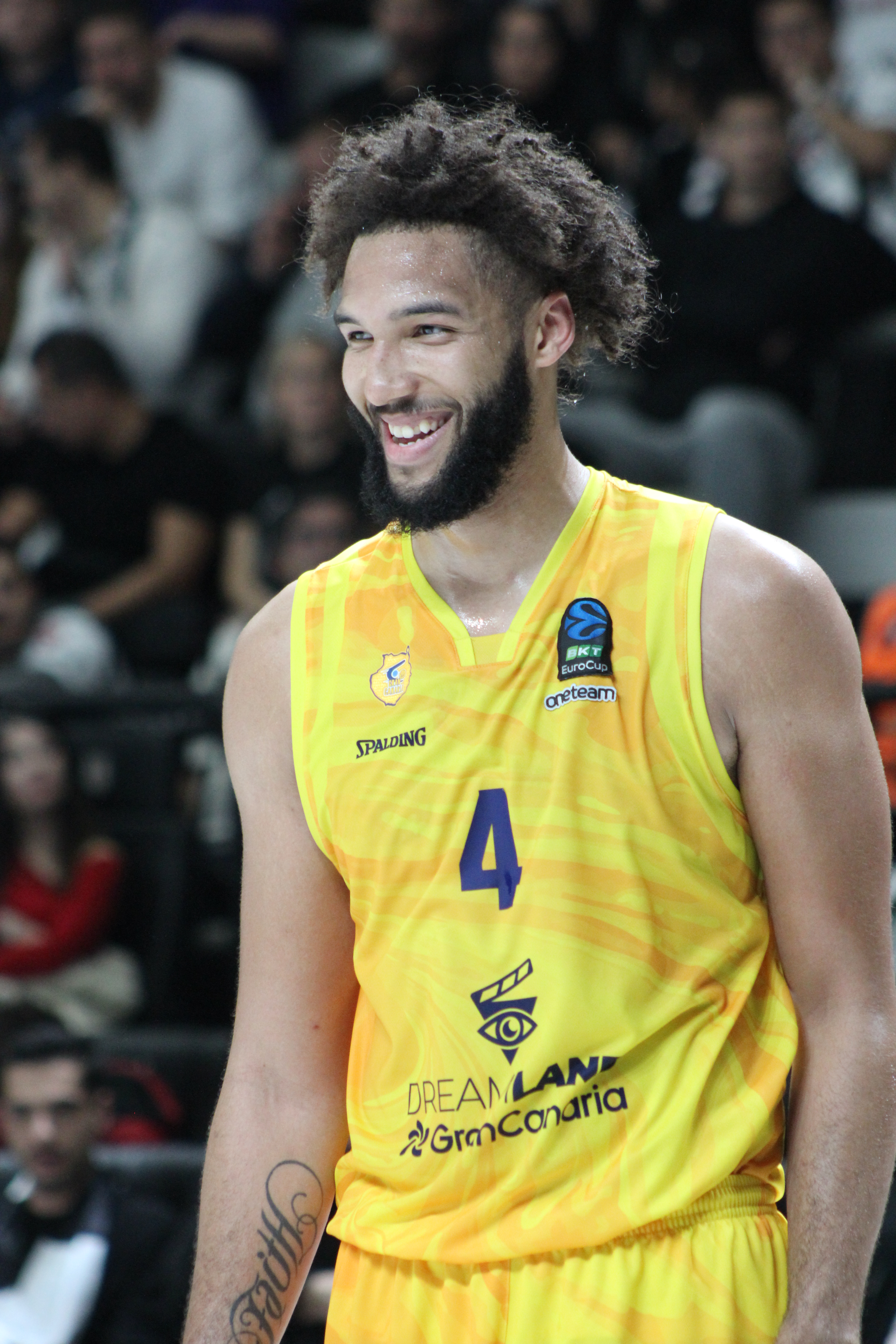
- Conditt with Gran Canaria in 2024

No. 24 – Básquet Coruña
- Position: Center / power forward
- League: Liga ACB

Personal information
- Born: August 22, 2000 (age 26) Chicago, Illinois, U.S.
- Listed height: 6 ft 11 in (2.11 m)
- Listed weight: 234 lb (106 kg)

Career information
- High school: Corliss (Chicago, Illinois)
- College: Iowa State (2018–2022)
- NBA draft: 2022: undrafted
- Playing career: 2022–present

Career history
- 2022: Gigantes de Carolina
- 2022–2023: Promitheas Patras
- 2023: Gigantes de Carolina
- 2023–2024: Rip City Remix
- 2024: Gigantes de Carolina
- 2024–2025: Gran Canaria
- 2025–2026: Gigantes de Carolina
- 2026–present: Básquet Coruña

Career highlights
- BSN champion (2023); BSN Defensive Player of the Year (2024)
- Stats at NBA.com
- Stats at Basketball Reference

George Conditt IV (born August 22, 2000) is an American-Puerto Rican professional basketball player for Básquet Coruña of the Liga ACB. He played college basketball for the Iowa State Cyclones and represents the Puerto Rican national basketball team in FIBA basketball competitions.

== Early life ==
Conditt was born in Chicago, Illinois. He attended Corliss High School. He was an honor student. As a senior, he averaged 14.7 points, 17.0 rebounds and 8.0 blocks per game. He led Corliss to a 24–5 record, falling short of the school's first state tournament appearance by one game. He was selected to the Class 2A first-team All-State, the Chicago Sun-Times Class 2A second-team and was an All-Area honorable mention. Conditt was also selected to the USA Today All-USA high school basketball team Illinois Boys Basketball second team. He played in the City + Suburban All-Star Game and Prep Ball Stars Midwest Challenge. Ranked a three-star recruit by 247Sports, ESPN and Rivals.com, he picked Iowa State over Illinois and New Mexico.

== College career ==
As a freshman in 2018–2019, Conditt played in 26 games, averaging 8.0 minutes per game, along with 2.0 points, 1.7 rebounds and 1.0 blocks. As a sophomore, he was one of four Cyclones to play in all 32 games, making seven starts. He averaged 16.3 minutes, 7.0 points, 4.9 rebounds and was sixth in the Big 12 Conference men's basketball averaging 1.6 blocks. As a junior, Conditt was one of two Cyclones to play in all 24 games, making three starts. He averaged 2.4 points, 3.6 rebounds and was ninth in the Big 12, averaging 0.9 blocks. As a senior, he played in all 35 games, making 26 starts in his final season with the team. He averaged 4.9 points and 3.5 rebounds, and shot a career-best 66.3 percent from the field and 70.5 percent at the free-throw line. He also dished out a career-high 67 assists, becoming one of just four Big 12 players in the last 10 seasons 6'9 or taller with at least 65 assists. He recorded 30 blocks as a senior and finished his career with 128, the fourth-most in school history. As a No. 11 seed in the NCAA tournament, Iowa State defeated LSU in the first round and Wisconsin in the second round before falling to Miami in the Sweet Sixteen. Conditt scored 8 points in the loss, which marked his final collegiate game. At the conclusion of the 2021–2022 season, Conditt announced he would leave Iowa State and pursue professional basketball.

== Professional career ==
=== First stint with Carolina (2022) ===
Conditt was drafted with the second overall pick in the 2022 Baloncesto Superior Nacional draft by the Gigantes de Carolina. On April 7, 2022, Conditt officially signed with the Gigantes. In 25 domestic league matches, he averaged 11.8 points and 7.3 rebounds, playing around 27 minutes per contest.

=== Promitheas Patras (2022-2023) ===
On September 16, 2022, Conditt signed with Greek club Promitheas Patras. In 24 domestic league matches, he averaged 9.7 points and 6.2 rebounds, playing around 21 minutes per contest. Patras would finish the 2022-2023 season; 12–10 as the fifth seed, before being eliminated in the first round the GBL playoffs 2–1.

He also participated in the EuroCup with Patras, averaging as well as 7.6 points and 4.2 rebounds in the EuroCup.

=== Second stint with Carolina (2023) ===
On June 11, 2023, Conditt was announced as a member the Puerto Rico National Team to participate in the 2023 FIBA World Cup. He played his last game of the BSN regular season before traveling to the United States to participate in the Portland Trail Blazers camp. In 27 domestic league matches, he averaged 14.5 points and 9.3 rebounds, playing around 30 minutes per contest.

Afterwards, Conditt returned to the Gigantes for the first game of the quarterfinals against the number one seed Piratas de Quebradillas. In a series where no one saw Carolina advancing to the semifinals, Conditt, along with Tremont Waters and former NBA player Mike Scott, eliminated the favorite team to win the national title in six games. Quebradillas had the most dangerous duo of imported players in the tournament with Brandon Knight and Hassan Whiteside. On July 27, he helped the Gigantes de Carolina defeat the defending champions Vaqueros de Bayamón in Game 5 to secure the franchise's first championship in history.

=== Rip City Remix (2023–2024) ===
ESPN's Adrian Wojnarowski announced, Conditt had agreed to on an Exhibit 10 deal with the Portland Trail Blazers on September 10, 2024. He would join the Blazers training camp and likely end up playing for the franchise's new G League team, the Rip City Remix.

On October 10, 2023, Conditt signed with the Portland Trail Blazers, but was waived on October 21. Nine days later, he joined the Rip City Remix of the NBA G League.

=== Third stint with Carolina (2024) ===
On April 8, 2024, Conditt returned to the Gigantes de Carolina. In 27 domestic league matches, he averaged 14.5 points and 9.3 rebounds, playing around 30 minutes per contest. On July 11, 2024, the league announced the end of season award winners; with Conditt being named the league's Defensive Player of the Year.

=== Gran Canaria (2024–2025) ===
On July 19, 2024, CB Gran Canaria a Liga ACB team in Spain announced and finalized the signing of George Conditt IV.

=== Básquet Coruña (2026–present) ===
After another stint with Gigantes de Carolina, Conditt returned to Spain in 2026, signing for Básquet Coruña of the Liga ACB on July 23.

== National team career ==
Although a native of Chicago, Conditt represents Puerto Rico at the international level due to his mother's Puerto Rican ancestry. At the 2018 FIBA Under-18 Americas Championship, he averaged 11.8 points, 6.7 rebounds and 3.3 blocks, helping lead the team to a fourth-place finish.

In 2021, he averaged 14.5 points and 3.5 rebounds in two games while playing for Puerto Rico at the Olympic Qualifying Tournament in Belgrade, Serbia. He shot 76.5 percent from the field in the event, highlighted by a game against Serbia where he shot 9-for-10 from the field and scored 20 points. The next game he netted nine points and had four rebounds against Italy.

In 2024, he was part of the team that helped Puerto Rico qualify for the 2024 Summer Olympics after defeating both Italy in the semifinals and Lithuania in the final of one of four 2024 FIBA Men's Olympic Qualifying Tournaments.

Conditt plays center for the national team.

== Personal life ==
Conditt's father, George Conditt III, played defensive lineman for Iowa State Cyclones football in the 1990s, lettering twice. His mother, Carol, taught him Spanish and instilled in him the desire to play for Puerto Rico. He is one of five children of the couple. He is a member of Phi Beta Sigma fraternity.
