= Corliss High School =

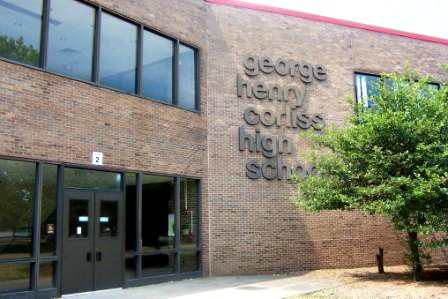

Location
- 821 E. 103rd Street; Chicago, Illinois 60628; United States; 41.7064°N 87.6026°W

Information
- School type: Public; Secondary
- Motto: In Pursuit Of Excellence.
- Established: 1971
- School district: Chicago Public Schools
- CEEB code: 140763
- Principal: Kevin Coppage
- Grades: 9–12
- Gender: Coed
- Enrollment: 357 (2024–2025)
- Campus type: Urban
- Colors: Black; Gold
- Athletics conference: Chicago Public League
- Team name: Trojans
- Accreditation: North Central Association of Colleges and Schools
- Newspaper: The Trojanaire
- Yearbook: Epoch
- Website: newcorlisshs.org

George Henry Corliss High School (commonly known as Corliss High School) is a public 4–year high school located in the Pullman neighborhood on the far south side of Chicago, Illinois, United States. Corliss is operated by the Chicago Public Schools district. Opened in September 1974, The school is named in the honor of American mechanical engineer and inventor George Henry Corliss.

== History ==
During the 1970–1971 school year, the residents of the community areas located on far south side requested to James F. Redmond, the General Superintendent of Chicago Schools, that two new high schools were needed to relieve overcrowding at the already two existing schools, Harlan and Fenger. At the time, both schools had an enrollment of approx. 2,500; surpassing the buildings' capacity. The school proposals were approved by the Chicago Board of Education and construction on Corliss began in 1973 (construction on the other requested school which became known as Percy L. Julian High School began in 1974). Designed by Myron Goldsmith, The school was completed in two phases; beginning in August 1973 and concluding in July 1974.

The school opened to freshman and sophomore classes, totaling 800 students, for the 1974–1975 school year in September 1974. The following year, an additional 1,100 students enrolled. The initial name of the school, Corliss High School, came from its location being 103rd Street and Corliss Avenue. It was later renamed George Henry Corliss High School after inventor George Henry Corliss and dedicated to him on May 15, 1976. The school's first senior class graduation occurred in June 1977.

=== Facilities ===
In honor of the African-American heritage, Corliss has named different facilities within the school after famous African Americans. The school auditorium was named in honor of the composer-pianist Duke Ellington, which is called "Ellington Hall". The physical education building was named for the baseball player Jackie Robinson. The library media center named for the Harlem Renaissance poet Arna Bontemps. The school is divided into three subunits known as "houses" which was created to provide a smaller school atmosphere within a large school.

== Other information ==
In 2012, the school joined the Chicago Public Schools' STEM program. Since 2013, Corliss has shared its campus with Butler College Preparatory High School, a public charter school which is a part of the Noble Network of Charter Schools.

== Athletics ==
Corliss competes in the Chicago Public League (CPL) and a member of the Illinois High School Association (IHSA). The school's sports teams are nicknamed the Trojans. The boys' football team were Class 5A and qualified for state finals three times; 1981–82, 2002–03 and 2004–05. For the 2017–18 and 2018–19 seasons, The boys' basketball team were Class 2A and regional champions under the leadership of coach Harvey Jones.

== Notable alumni ==
- Anthony Beale (Class of 1986) — Alderman, City of Chicago (9th ward).
- George Conditt IV (Class of 2018) — professional basketball player and Olympian
- Eddie Johnson (Class of 1978) — police officer, former Chicago Police Department superintendent.
- Antwon Tanner (attended) — Actor, (Moesha, The Parkers, One Tree Hill).
- Darrell Walker (Class of 1979) — former NBA guard, (New York Knicks, Washington Bullets) (1983–1993).
