= Chicago Virtual Charter School =

Location
- 38 South Peoria Street; Chicago, Illinois 60607
- 41.88082610°N 87.65001880°W

Information
- Type: Charter school
- Established: 2006
- Closed: July 1, 2020
- School district: CPS
- Faculty: 30
- Grades: K - 12
- Enrollment: 680
- Student to teacher ratio: 22.7

The Chicago Virtual Charter School (CVCS) was a state-funded nonprofit K-12 charter school located in Chicago, Illinois, in the Near West Side neighborhood. It was also the region's only public virtual school, where students followed a nontraditional model of partial attendance. The school closed on July 1, 2020.

== History ==
Opened in 2006, local and state school leaders established CVCS to support alternative education in the region and create an environment that provides students with more responsibility over their individual pace of study. It balances a hybrid model of remote and physical attendance, where students are expected to attend 5 hours per day 5 days per week. As the only public virtual school in Chicago, it also serves as one of the major sources of evaluation for innovative approaches that impact student performance, costs, and oversight. Since it was founded, student performance has generally outperformed average test scores in the area.

== Demographics ==
The racial breakdown of the students enrolled for the 2017 - 2018 school year was:

- White - 13%
- Hispanic - 23%
- Black - 56%
- Asian - 5%
- Multiracial - 3%

The sex breakdown of the students enrolled for the 2017 - 2018 school year was:

- Male - 51%
- Female - 49%

== See also ==
- List of schools in Chicago Public Schools
