= ACE Amandla Charter High School =

Coordinates: 41.796143°N 87.626300°W

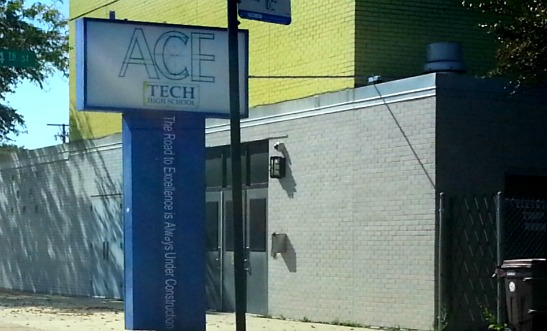
- ACE Amandla former location, 2013

Location
- 6820 South Washtenaw Avenue; Chicago, Illinois 60629; United States

Information
- School type: Public; Secondary; Charter
- Motto: Our number one priority is student achievement.
- Opened: 2004
- School district: ACE Amandla Charter Schools
- CEEB code: 140648
- Principal: Amanda Nagel
- Grades: 9–12
- Gender: Coed
- Enrollment: 171 (2021–2022)
- Campus: Urban
- Colours: Navy Blue; Gold
- Nickname: Bobcats
- Website: aceamandla.org

ACE Amandla Charter High School (formerly known as ACE Technical Charter High School), is a public four-year charter high school located in the Chicago Lawn neighborhood in Chicago, Illinois, United States. Opened for the 2004–2005 school year, the school is operated by Amandla Charter Schools. The name ACE stands for Architecture, Construction, and Engineering.

== History and Student Body ==
ACE Amandla Charter High School was founded in 2004 by a group of construction industry professionals and entrepreneurs. This collection of pioneers desired to introduce Chicago youth to careers in Architecture, Construction, and Engineering. ACE Amandla Board of Directors is composed of education professionals, entrepreneurs, and construction industry professionals. ACE Tech serves approximately 500 students from Chicago's South Loop, Washington Park, Back of the Yards, Gage Park, Englewood and surrounding south side neighborhoods. While many students are interested in these industries, ACE Amandla caters to students with a wide variety of interests and aspirations.

ACE Amandla first location was 5410 South State Street in the Washington Park neighborhood on the south side. During that time, the school was operated by the Chicago Public Schools district. ACE Amandla was housed in the former Mary Terrell Elementary School building, a Chicago public school which closed after the 2001–02 school year. In 2018, ACE Amandla (Then called ACE Tech) merged with Amandla Charter Schools, creating ACE Amandla Charter High School and relocating to its present location.

== Admissions/Internships ==
ACE Amandla is a lottery based school. 150 incoming freshmen students are accepted each year. There is no standard test or any placement exams required. ACE Amandla provides a full continuum of Special Education services, and does not discriminate against students with disabilities. All completed student applications are given a number and are chosen through a blind lottery.

== Athletics ==
Under the operations of Chicago Public Schools, ACE Amandla competed in the Chicago Public League (CPL), and was a member of the Illinois High School Association (IHSA) as Ace Tech. ACE Amandla teams were stylized as the Bobcats. ACE Amandla endeavored to provide its students with as many opportunities for athletic competition as possible. ACE Amandla Athletic Program had a wide array of sporting opportunities considering the school's size of 500 students.

Currently ACE Tech offers:

- Boys' Basketball
- Cheerleading & Dance
- Girls' & Boys' Soccer
- Softball
- Girls' Volleyball
