= Chicago Military Academy =

Chicago Military Academy-Bronzeville
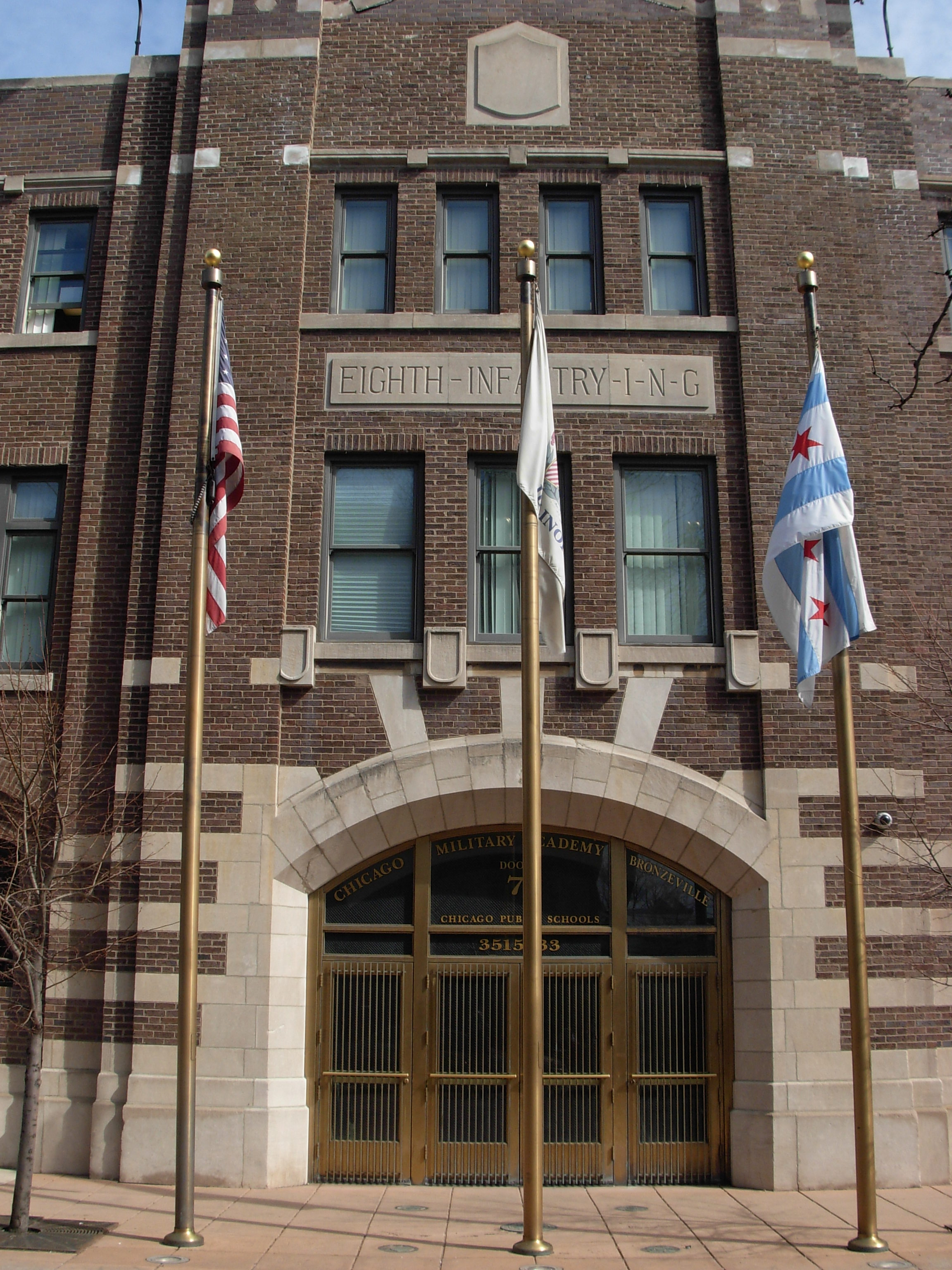

Location
- 3519 S. Giles Avenue; Chicago, Illinois 60653; United States; 41.8305°N 87.6190°W

Information
- School type: Public Secondary Military
- Opened: August 24, 1999
- School district: Chicago Public Schools
- Superintendent: Richard W. Miller
- CEEB code: 140689
- Grades: 9–12
- Gender: Coed
- Enrollment: 317 (2015-16)
- Campus type: Urban
- Colors: Green; Gold
- Athletics conference: Chicago Public League
- Team name: Eagles
- Accreditation: North Central Association of Colleges and Schools
- Website: www.chicagomilitaryacademy.org

Chicago Military Academy-Bronzeville is a public four-year military high school in the Bronzeville neighborhood on the South Side of Chicago, Illinois, in a building known as the Eighth Regiment Armory. The academy opened in August 1999. It includes a mandatory Junior Reserve Officers' Training Corps (JROTC) instructional component in addition to a four-year college preparatory curriculum.

== Athletics ==
- Football
- Soccer
- Volleyball
- Basketball
- Baseball
- Fencing

== Notable alumni ==
- Stephanie Coleman (class of 2006) – Politician, City of Chicago alderman (16th ward).
