= Lionel Hampton Fine & Performing Arts School =

Location
- 3434 W. 77th St. Chicago, Illinois 60652; United States; 41°45′13.6″N 87°42′32.3″W

Information
- Established: 2000
- School district: Chicago Public Schools
- Principal: Dr. Shonnika Henry
- Teaching staff: 40 (as of 2006–2007)
- Grades: K–8
- Enrollment: 676 (as of 2009–2010)
- Student to teacher ratio: 18.2 (as of 2006–2007)
- Mascot: Hawk
- Website: www.hamptoncps.org

Lionel Hampton Fine & Performing Arts School is a public magnet school for grades K–8 in southwestern Chicago, Illinois, United States. This school was started in the fall of 2000. This school was formerly known as New Dawes.

== History ==
Originally started to relieve overcrowding at the Charles R. Dawes Elementary School in Chicago's Ashburn neighborhood, the school initially known as New Dawes Area Elementary School, was officially named Lionel Hampton Fine & Performing Arts School in 2003 after musician Lionel Hampton. The school is located between St. Louis Ave. and Homan Ave. on 77th St. on the property formerly owned by the Chicago Park District and was named Thomas Dooley Park, in honor of Thomas Anthony Dooley III.

== Campus ==
The school is located in the Ashburn neighborhood.

== Curriculum ==
The school provides a diverse curriculum, with each class attending an elective subject—such as Music, Computer Science, or Physical Education—daily throughout the week.

The school follows the Student code of conduct and has a uniform. Each student must wear a white collared shirt and navy blue pants, unless they have gym for that day. If they do have gym, then they must wear the school's gym uniform which consists of the Lionel Hampton T-shirt and red jogging pants.

The school has half-days usually once every 15–18 school academic days. The school is year-round and has vacations throughout the year, such as September 28 – October 13.

== Special events ==
Lionel Hampton has also been known to have held special school events such as Student of the Month Luncheons which consists of students, (one per class) to attend a luncheon held usually in the last week of each month, to be recognized for their achievements and/or display of good character. Students in grades Kindergarten through Fifth grade enjoy a one-day event known as Fun Fair, which consists of activities and games kids can be involved in. The upper grades (6–8) go to educational field trips such as to the Shedd Aquarium, plays, or to the Field Museum of Natural History.

== Extracurricular activities ==
Hampton has an active after school program providing student groups and activities. They include academic tutoring, art club, band, basketball, board games club, book club, cheerleading, choir, dance, newspaper, photography, reading clubs, science club, Spanish club, track, and volleyball.

The school has also competed in annual dance team competitions.

== Notable alumni ==
- Dinah Washington
