= Phoenix Military Academy =

Location
- 145 S Campbell Ave; Chicago, Illinois 60612; United States; 41.8790°N 87.6884°W

Information
- Type: Public, College-prep, Military
- Motto: Proper Prior Planning Prevents Piss Poor Performance
- Established: 2004
- School district: Chicago Public Schools
- Principal: Ferdinand Wipachit
- Grades: 9–12
- Gender: Coeducational
- Enrollment: 540
- Colors: Black, Red
- Athletics conference: Chicago Public League
- Team name: Firebirds
- Newspaper: The Phoenix Chronicle
- Website: phoenixmilitary.org

Phoenix Military Academy is a public military high school in East Garfield Park, Chicago, United States.

== History ==
Phoenix Military Academy, (Commonly abbreviated as PMA) was founded in 2004 and originally located in the same building as Orr Academy High School. It has since been moved to Grant Campus or the older location of Orr.

== Academics ==
All students are required to attain 24 credits to graduate. In addition to usual core subjects such as English and the sciences, students also take two years of foreign language, Two years of the arts and are mandated to take classes to prepare for ROTC.

In June 2015, it was announced that PMA was awarded a $6 million DOD grant for a new STEM and Leadership Academy Pilot Program.
