= Richards Career Academy =

Location
- 5009 S. Laflin Street; Chicago, Illinois 60609; United States
- Coordinates: 41.8029°N 87.6625°W

Information
- School type: Public; secondary; vocational
- Established: 1946
- School district: Chicago Public Schools
- CEEB code: 141095
- Principal: Ellen M. Kennedy
- Grades: 9–12
- Gender: Co-ed
- Enrollment: 229 (2019–2020)
- Campus type: Urban
- Colors: Royal blue White
- Athletics conference: Chicago Public League
- Team name: Warriors
- Accreditation: North Central Association of Colleges and Schools
- Yearbook: Images
- Website: richards.cps.edu

Ellen H. Richards Career Academy (formerly known as Richards Vocational High School) is a public four-year vocational high school located in the Back of the Yards neighborhood on the southwest side of Chicago, Illinois, United States. Opened in 1946, Richards is operated by the Chicago Public Schools system and is named for environmental chemist Ellen Henrietta Richards.

== History ==
Richards was established by the Chicago Public Schools in September 1946 as an all-girls vocational school. At the time of its opening, enrollment was 230. The school was initially housed in a former elementary school building at 2535 South Green Street which was used as a barracks during World War I. Prior to Richards, the school building served as a branch of the Englewood High School.

The early vocational courses offered at Richards consisted of Home Arts, Dressmaking, Basic Business Training, Bookkeeping, Beauty Culture, Art, Commercial Art, English, History, Commercial Geography, Science, and Physical Education. This curriculum remained unchanged until the 1961–1962 school year when a course in office practice was added.

By the 1962–1963 school year, the enrollment had more than doubled, reaching 870.

Due to the construction of the Stevenson Expressway, the school was moved from its South Green location to 3031 South Wallace, another building that once housed an elementary school in 1955. The school moved once again to its present location, 5009 South Laflin Street, during the 1967–1968 school year. The new location was selected to provide a new and much larger building, specifically designed for a vocational high school with an increasing enrollment, which was about 1,300 at the time.

Richards became co-educational during the 1988–1989 school year.

== Athletics ==
Richards competes in the Chicago Public League (CPL) and is a member of the Illinois High School Association (IHSA). The school sport teams are nicknamed Warriors. The girls' basketball team were regional champions and Class 1A in 2018–2019.
