= Phoebe A. Hearst Fine Arts Magnet School =

Elementary School in Chicago, Illinois, USA

Coordinates: 41°48′30.9″N 87°44′46.2″W

Phoebe A. Hearst Fine Arts Magnet School is located at 4640 S. Lamon Ave in Chicago, Illinois. The school's colors are navy blue and gold. The principal of the school as of 2013 is Teresa Chrobak-Prince. The school has a uniform policy, students shall wear a navy blue shirt and navy blue pants. 8th Grade students shall wear a white shirt and navy blue pants. The school also have a motto which is, "Hearst Warriors RESPECTFUL, RESPONSIBLE, and always do their BEST!"

== Athletics ==
Basketball (boys)- Hearst Warriors - Mr. Ellis and Mr. Mull
