= Gary Comer College Prep Middle School =

Location
- 1010 East 72nd Street; Chicago, Illinois 60619; United States
- 41.7646°N 87.6001°W

Information
- School type: Public Secondary Charter
- Opened: 2011
- Principal: Trent Epley
- Grades: 6–8
- Gender: Coed
- Enrollment: 310
- Campus type: Urban
- Colors: Green; Gray; White
- Website: Gary Comer College Prep Middle School

Gary Comer College Prep Middle School is a Level 1 public three-year charter middle school located in the Grand Crossing neighborhood in Chicago, Illinois. It is a part of the Noble Network of Charter Schools. Gary Comer College Prep Middle School is the only middle school campus of the Noble Network of Charter Schools in Chicago, IL. Named after the late Gary Comer, the middle school shares a building with Paul Revere Elementary School in the Greater Grand Crossing neighborhood.
