= Hancock High School (Chicago) =

John Hancock College Prep High School

Location
- 5437 W. 64th Place; Chicago, Illinois 60638; United States; 41.7752107°N 87.7604801°W

Information
- School type: Public secondary selective enrollment
- Established: 1999
- School district: Chicago Public Schools
- Principal: Trista L. Harper
- Grades: 9–12
- Gender: Coed
- Enrollment: 1043 (2024-25)
- Campus type: Urban
- Colors: Maroon; White
- Mascot: Eagles
- Newspaper: The Signature
- Website: hancockhs.org

John Hancock College Preparatory High School (commonly known as Hancock High School) is a public four-year selective enrollment high school located in the Clearing neighborhood on the southwest side of Chicago, Illinois, United States. Hancock is named for American Revolution patriot and statesman John Hancock. The school is a part of the Chicago Public Schools district.

== History ==
Hancock opened as an elementary school in 1999 at 4034 W. 56th Street in the West Elsdon neighborhood and was converted into a high school in 2002. The school was renamed Hancock College Prep HS and moved to a brand new building located at 5437 W. 64th Place in the Clearing neighborhood, Hancock's current school building was completed in 2021 and the ribbon cutting ceremony was on August 27, 2021. It opened to students on August 30, 2021.

Hancock's former school building was originally known as Lourdes High School which opened in 1936 as the separate girls’ school of the De La Salle Institute. In September 2015, the Chicago school district changed Hancock into a "selective enrollment" school, and its attendance boundary was phased out, with the last traditional students graduating in 2018.

Among other things, the new building has 28 standard classrooms, computer labs, specialized subject suites, a black box theater, and a media center. It will serve 1,000 students.

== Athletics ==
Hancock competes in the Chicago Public League (CPL) and is a member of the Illinois High School Association (IHSA). Hancock sport teams are nicknamed Eagles. The boys' baseball team were regional champions in 2007–08.
