= Noble Academy (Chicago) =

Coordinates: 41.9072°N 87.6455°W

The Noble Academy
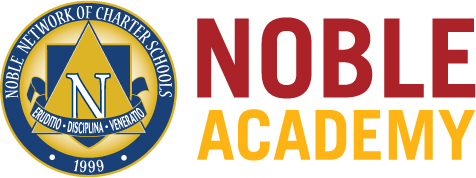

Location
- 1443 N. Ogden; Chicago, Illinois 60610; United States

Information
- School type: Public Secondary Charter
- Opened: 2014
- Principal: Tierionna Pinkston
- Grades: 9–12
- Gender: Coed
- Enrollment: 537 (2024-2025)
- Campus type: Urban
- Colors: Red; Gold
- Website: The Noble Academy

The Noble Academy is a public charter high school located in the Near North Side neighborhood in Chicago, Illinois, United States. It is a collaboration between the Noble Network of Charter Schools and Phillips Exeter Academy in New Hampshire. The Noble Academy is a Level 1+ school, according to Chicago Public School rankings.

== Student body ==
The Noble Academy has 537 students enrolled for the 2024–2025 school year and is one of the most diverse Chicago Public Schools in the city, attracting students from 47 different zip codes and over 100 elementary schools. 48.4% of the students identify as Hispanic; 45.8% of students identify as Black; 2.2% identify as Asian; 1.1% as White, and 1.7% identify as another race.

== Student programming ==
The Noble Academy is a part of the Noble Athletic League and has 11 varsity sports. This includes cross country, soccer, football, cheerleading, volleyball, baseball, and softball.
