= Chicago International Charter School =

Charter school in Chicago, Illinois, US

- Chicago, Illinois; United States

Chicago International Charter School (CICS) is a charter school with 14 campuses in Chicago, Illinois. CICS has a student population composed of 96% ethnic minorities. Of the population, 66% are African American, 25% are Hispanic, 4% are Caucasian, 2% are Asian/Pacific Islander and 1% are multi-racial, with 86% coming from low income households.

== Campuses ==
- Avalon (K-8)
- Basil (K-8)
- Bucktown (K-8)
- ChicagoQuest (9–12)
- Irving Park (K-8)
- Lloyd Bond (K-6)
- Longwood (3–12)
- Loomis Primary (K-2)
- Northtown Academy (9–12)
- Prairie (K-8)
- Ralph Ellison (9–12)
- Washington Park (K-8)
- West Belden (K-8)
- Wrightwood (K-8)
