= Gary Comer College Prep =

Location
- 7131 S. South Chicago Avenue; Chicago, Illinois 60619; United States
- 41.765215°N 87.603977°W

Information
- Type: Public, secondary charter school
- Opened: 2008
- School district: Noble Network of Charter Schools
- Principal: JuDonne Hemingway
- Grades: 9–12
- Gender: Co-educational
- Enrollment: 750 (2018-2019)
- Campus type: Urban
- Colors: Green; Gray; White
- Website: nobleschools.org/gary-comer/

Gary Comer College Prep is a Level 1 public grade nine through twelve charter high school located in Chicago, Illinois' Greater Grand Crossing neighborhood. It is a part of the Noble Network of Charter Schools. It is named after the Gary Comer, the founder of Lands' End and philanthropic entrepreneur. Gary Comer founded the Comer Youth Center in 2006, with Gary Comer College Prep opening its doors in 2008, serving grades nine through twelve. In 2011, the Gary Comer College Prep Middle School opened creating two campuses under one school, serving grades six through twelve. Prior to becoming the principal of GCCP, Ms. Kelly founded Gary Comer College Prep Middle School in 2011 and served as the principal there for four years. Before joining Noble, Ms. Kelly served as the Principal of KIPP Indianapolis College Prep, a 5-8 middle school located in the inner-city of Indianapolis, IN.

== Academic offerings and results ==
According to Chicago Public Schools, in 2018, Gary Comer College Prep's 10th grade reading results on the PSAT 10 were in the 98th percentile and student growth across all grade-levels was above average. The school has an 85% 5-year high school graduation rate.

Additionally, in 2017, a comprehensive report was released by Stanford University's Center for Education Outcomes (CREDO), which shows that students at the Noble Network of Charter Schools, of which Gary Comer College Prep is part, receive the equivalent of nearly two additional years of math education during just one normal school year.

== College readiness and college graduation rate ==
In an effort to incorporate college readiness into the school before 12th grade, students participate in the Summer of a Lifetime program. Through Summer of a Lifetime, scholars are provided funding and support to participate in life-changing, summer academic enrichment programs college campuses nationwide. The Noble class of 2018 included 2,300 scholars, and 98% of them were accepted to at least one college, this accumulated to over 14,700 college acceptances. Noble seniors earned a record-breaking $486 million in scholarships, including 71 recipients of the Pritzker Access Scholarship for undocumented students.

Gary Comer College Prep partners with the Gary Comer Youth Center's Comer to College initiative, a supplemental program that provides extensive resources for college access and success.

Gary Comer College Prep partners with C.H.A.M.P.S. Male Mentoring Program, which offers a culturally sensitive approach to developing the mindsets of African American and Latino young men.
