= Rauner College Prep =

Coordinates: 41°53′31.9″N 87°39′40.6″W

Location
- 1337 W. Ohio Street; Chicago, Illinois 60642; United States

Information
- School type: Public Secondary Charter
- Opened: 2006
- Principal: Brendan Bedell
- Grades: 9–12
- Gender: Coed
- Enrollment: 621 (2017-2018)
- Campus type: Urban
- Colors: navy orange
- Website: Rauner College Prep

Rauner College Prep is a public four-year charter high school located in the West Town in Chicago, Illinois. It is a part of the Noble Network of Charter Schools. Rauner College Prep is named in honor of donors Diana and Bruce Rauner. It opened in 2006 and serves students in grades nine through twelve.
