= UIC College Prep High School =

Coordinates: 41°51′55.4″N 87°40′32.7″W

UIC College Prep High School, the LSV Campus of the Noble Street Charter School

Location
- 1231 S. Damen Avenue; Chicago, Illinois 60608; United States

Information
- School type: Public Secondary Charter
- Opened: 2008
- Principal: Audrey Borling
- Grades: 9–12
- Gender: Coed
- Enrollment: 927 (2018-2019)
- Colors: Red; Blue
- Website: nobleschools.org/uic

UIC College Prep High School, the LSV Campus of the Noble Street Charter School is a public four-year charter high school located in Chicago, Illinois. It is operated by the Noble Network of Charter Schools in partnership with the University of Illinois Chicago.

== Background ==
=== History ===
UIC College Prep High School, the LSV Campus of the Noble Network of Charter Schools was founded in 2008. It is named for LSV Asset Management support of Noble's expansion. A close partnership with the University of Illinois at Chicago lends its name to the school.

=== Partnership with the University of Illinois at Chicago ===
UIC's partnership with UICCP is governed by a formal memorandum of understanding. The high school's day-to-day operations are the responsibility of UICCP and Noble Network staff. UIC's major responsibility is to coordinate support from UIC faculty and staff for UICCP's academic and co-curricular programs and to support student success initiatives for both current UICCP students and UICCP graduates who have matriculated to UIC.
