= Chicago Bulls College Prep =

Public charter school in Chicago, Illinois, United States

Coordinates: 41.879054°N 87.678460°W

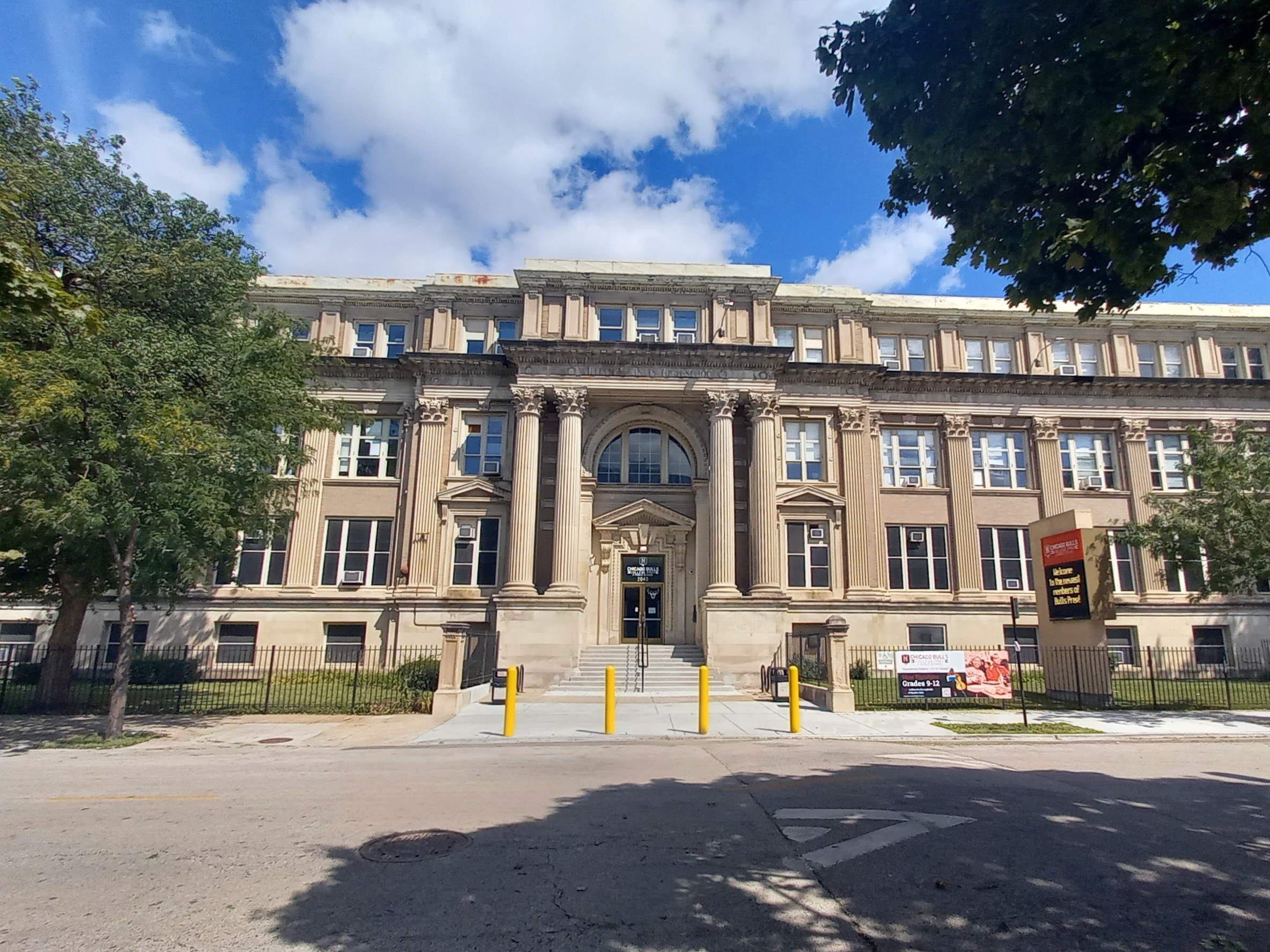

Location
- 2040 W. Adams Street; Chicago, Illinois 60612; United States

Information
- School type: Public Secondary Charter
- Opened: 2009
- Principal: Mark Hamstra
- Grades: 9–12
- Gender: Coed
- Enrollment: 1,099 (2017–18)
- Campus type: Urban
- Colors: Red; Black; White
- Website: Chicago Bulls College Prep

Chicago Bulls College Prep (CBCP) is a public four-year charter high school located on the Near West Side of Chicago, Illinois. It is a part of the Noble Network of Charter Schools. It is named after the Chicago Bulls basketball team, which endowed the school.

Chicago Bulls College Prep is a level 1+ school, based on CPS rankings.

The building was formerly known as McKinley High School, which had alumni like Walt Disney. The school opened in August 2009.

== Academics ==
The school has an average graduation rate of 82%.

In 2017, it was reported that all students in the senior class that year and since 2013 had been accepted to colleges and 50% of them dropped out.

== Athletics ==
The school is a member of the Illinois High School Association (IHSA).

== Discipline and controversy ==
As with other Noble Charter schools in Chicago, in 2012–13 Chicago Bulls College Prep expelled and suspended a larger proportion of students than public schools in Chicago. The school expelled 1.75% of its students in the year, compared to 0.05% of students in Chicago public schools, and suspended 38.5% of students compared to 9% of students in public schools.

The school has been criticised for charging parents for their children's disciplinary offences.

In 2016, a parent reported that the school had discouraged her son from applying to an historically black college.

== Notable alumni ==
- Chelsea Billingsley (2015), aka Chelsea B, fiber artist who has designed pieces for celebrities and brands such as Lizzo, the Chicago Bulls, and RuPaul's Drag Race.
