= Butler College Preparatory High School =

Butler College Prep

Location
- 821 E. 103rd St; Chicago, Illinois 60628; United States

Information
- School type: Public Secondary Charter
- Opened: 2013
- Principal: Christopher Goins
- Grades: 9-12
- Gender: Coed
- Enrollment: 630 (2018-2019)
- Campus type: Urban
- Colors: Orange and Gray
- Website: https://nobleschools.org/butler/

Butler College Prep (formerly known as Pullman College Prep) is a public four-year charter high school located in the Pullman neighborhood of Chicago, Illinois, USA. It is a part of the Noble Network of Charter Schools. It shares its campus with Corliss High School. It is named after John and Alice Butler, who provided the funding necessary to open the school. It is a part of the Noble Network of Charter Schools. Butler College Prep is a Level 1 school, based on CPS school quality rankings. Butler College Prep opened in 2013.

== Awards, Accolades, and Recognition ==
In 2016, Butler College Prep was recognized by Chicago Magazine as the best charter high school in Chicago. The previous year, In 2015, the Illinois Network of Charter Schools recognized Butler College Prep as the state’s highest-performing charter school (in terms of test growth) with a predominantly black student body. Butler College Prep has also been recognized by Ebony Magazine for its commitment to diversity in its teaching staff. In 2016, Fusion Media Group spotlighted a teacher and a student with cerebral palsy from Butler College Prep.
