= Golder College Prep =

Location
- 1454 West Superior Street; Chicago, Illinois 60642; United States
- 41.8955°N 87.6644°W

Information
- School type: Public Secondary Charter
- Opened: 2007
- Principal: Jessie Weingartner
- Grades: 9–12
- Gender: Coed
- Enrollment: 660 (2018-2019)
- Campus type: Urban
- Colors: Navy blue Gray; Purple
- Website: Golder College Prep

Golder College Prep is a public four-year charter high school located in the West Town neighborhood of Chicago, Illinois. It is a part of the Noble Network of Charter Schools. It is named after the Joan Golder family. The school opened in 2007, and serves grades nine through twelve. Golder College Prep is a level 1+ school based on CPS rankings.

== Student Population ==
Golder College Prep serves 660 students, 90% of which are low income, 17.3% are students with learning disabilities, and 11.4% are English Language Learners.
