= Baker College Prep =

Location
- 2710 E. 89th Street; Chicago, Illinois 60617; United States
- 41°44′04″N 87°33′23″W

Information
- School type: Public Secondary Charter
- Opened: 2013
- Principal: Mary Arrigo
- Grades: 9–12
- Gender: Coed
- Enrollment: 348 (2017–18)
- Campus type: Urban
- Colors: Navy Blue; Light Blue
- Website: Baker College Prep

Baker College Preparatory High School (also known as Baker College Prep) is a public four-year charter high school located in the South Chicago neighborhood on the far south side of Chicago, Illinois. It shares its campus with Bowen High School. Baker is operated by the Noble Network of Charter Schools and is named for civil and human rights activist Ella Baker. It opened in fall 2013. Twice a year, students propose solutions to community problems that they have studied in groups that semester and that they hope to participate in solving.
