= Johnson College Prep =

Location
- 6350 S. Stewart Avenue; Chicago, Illinois 60621; United States; 41.7784°N 87.6355°W

Information
- School type: Public; Secondary; Charter
- Opened: 2010
- School district: Noble Network of Charter Schools; Chicago Public Schools
- Principal: Ashley Terrell
- Grades: 9–12
- Gender: Coed
- Enrollment: 750 (2018–19)
- Campus type: Urban
- Colors: Navy Blue; Maroon; White
- Website: nobleschools.org/johnson/

Johnson College Prep is a public 4–year charter high school located in the Englewood neighborhood on the south side of Chicago, Illinois, United States. Johnson is a part of the Noble Network of Charter Schools and Chicago Public Schools. Opening in 2010, The school is named for John H. Johnson and his wife Eunice Johnson.
