= Hansberry College Prep =

Coordinates: 41.734421°N 87.651190°W

Location
- 8748 S. Aberdeen; Chicago, Illinois 60620; United States

Information
- School type: Public Secondary Charter
- Opened: 2012
- Principal: Kashawndra Wilson
- Grades: 9–12
- Gender: Coed
- Enrollment: 584 (2017–2018)
- Campus type: Urban
- Colors: Maroon; Gray
- Website: Hansberry College Prep

Hansberry College Prep, formerly known as "Noble Auburn Gresham College Prep", is a public four-year charter high school located in the Auburn Gresham in Chicago, Illinois, United States. It is a part of the Noble Network of Charter Schools. Hansberry College Prep opened in 2012 as Noble Auburn Gresham College Prep in recognition of the neighborhood in which the school resides. In July 2013, the campus changed its name to Hansberry College Prep in honor of Lorraine Hansberry. The school currently serves grades nine through twelve and graduated its first class in 2016. In 2014, HCP was officially authorized as an IB World school.
