= Rowe-Clark Math & Science Academy =

Coordinates: 41°53′42.8″N 87°43′5.4″W

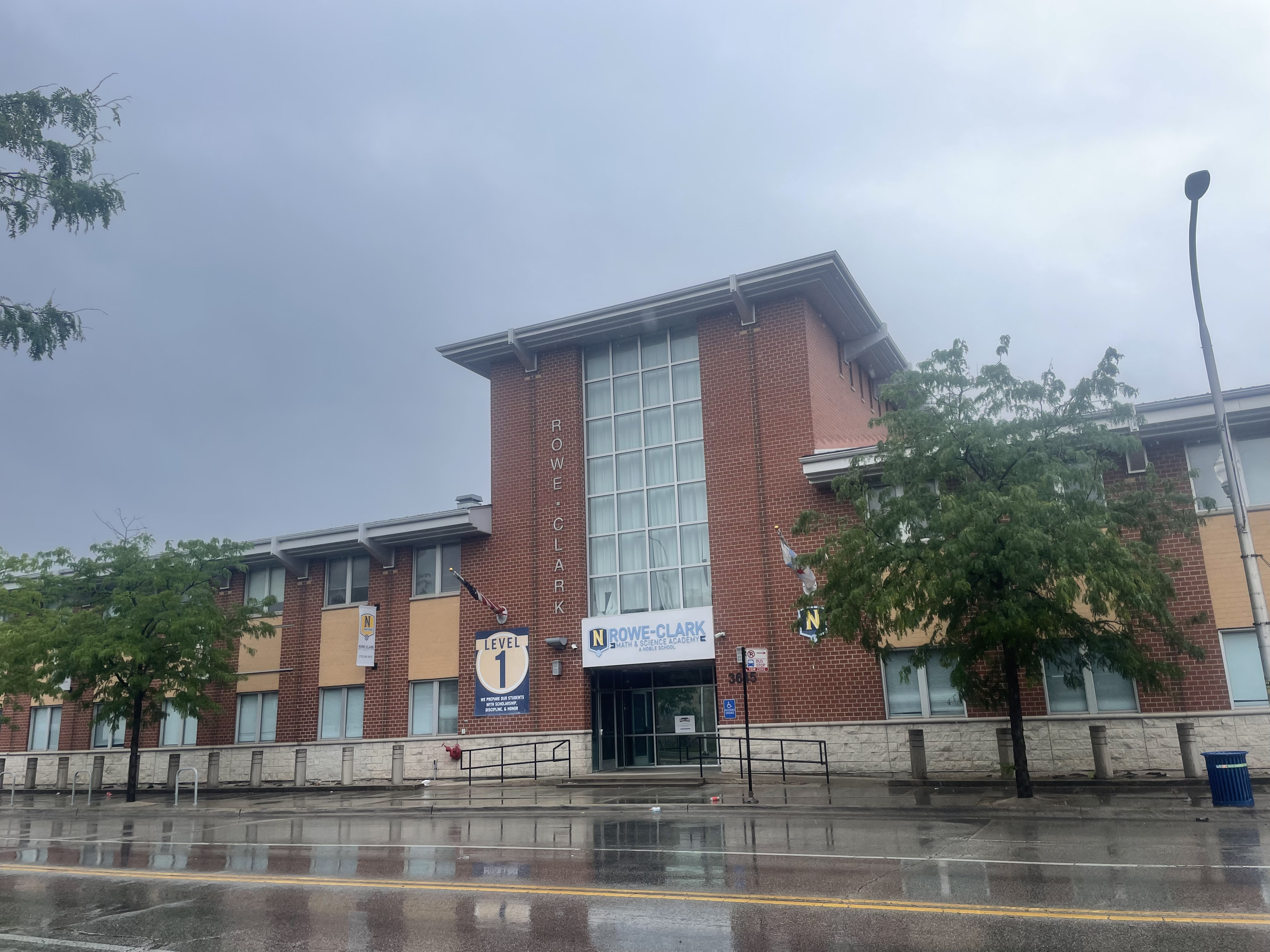

Location
- 3645 West Chicago Avenue; Chicago, Illinois 60651; United States

Information
- School type: Public; Secondary; Charter
- Opened: August 2007
- Principal: Miracle Moss–McMorris
- Grades: 9–12
- Gender: Coed
- Enrollment: 297 (2025–2026)
- Campus type: Urban
- Colors: Sky Blue; Gold
- Athletics conference: Noble League Athletic Conference
- Mascot: Masai Lion
- Website: nobleschools.org/roweclark/

Rowe-Clark Math & Science Academy is a public 4–year charter high school located in the Humboldt Park Area neighborhood in Chicago, Illinois, United States. Rowe-Clark opened in August 2007 and is a part of the Noble Network of Charter Schools. Rowe-Clark serves grades 9 through 12.

== History ==
Opened during the 2007–2008 school year, Rowe-Clark is named after John Rowe, the former chairman and CEO of Exelon, and his wife Jeanne and Frank Clark, the former chairman and CEO of Commonwealth Edison who became president of the Chicago Board of Education in 2015, and his wife Vera; Rowe and Exelon both donated $2 million to open the school, and Clark also donated. Its founding principal was Joe Tenbusch.

== Academics ==
=== Curriculum ===
Rowe-Clark's curriculum is intensive and college-preparatory, with each student taking the equivalent of eight years of math, six years of English, four years of lab sciences, and four years of social sciences. Rowe-Clark is a Level 1 school, based on CPS school quality rankings.

=== Administration ===
From its opening until 2014, Joe Tenbusch served as Rowe-Clark principal. From 2014 until 2018, Brenda Cora served as principal of Rowe-Clark. In August 2020, Miracle Moss–McMorris became principal of Rowe-Clark. Prior to that, Moss–McMorris previously served as assistant principal and dean of students.

== Athletics ==
Rowe-Clark is a member of the Illinois High School Association (IHSA) and the Noble League Athletic Conference. The school's sport teams are named the Masai Lion.
