= Noble Schools =

Charter school network in Chicago, Illinois

Noble Network of Charter Schools

Location
- Chicago, Illinois

District information
- Type: State charter
- Motto: "BE NOBLE"
- Grades: 6-12
- Established: 1999
- Superintendent: Brenda Cora (CEO)
- Schools: 17

Students and staff
- Students: 12,543 (as of 10/2017)
- Staff: 1,000+
- Athletic conference: Chicago Public League

Other information
- Authorized by: Chicago Public Schools
- Website: nobleschools.org

Noble Schools (formerly known as the Noble Network of Charter Schools and as Noble Street Charter School) is an open enrollment, public charter network of high schools and middle schools serving students throughout Chicago. Noble was co-founded in 1999 by Michael Milkie and Tonya Hernandez through a partnership between Ron Manderschied, President of Northwestern University Settlement House. Noble's first expansions, Rauner College Prep and Pritzker College Prep, opened in 2006. There are currently 18 schools in the charter school network: 1 middle school and 17 high schools. Noble schools are public and open to all students in Chicago and there is no testing required for admission.

The student population for Noble Network schools is 98% minority and 89% low-income. It currently serves 12,543 students from more than 70 Chicago communities. The Noble Network has an overall college acceptance rate of 90%. In 2014 Black and Hispanic students in Noble schools ranked in the top 30 percent in reading, math and science. It was named top public charter network in 2015 by the Eli and Edythe Broad Foundation and Chicago Magazine named Noble schools as the five top charter high schools in Chicago.

According to Princeton University and the Brookings Institution in 2018, attending a Noble high school increased college enrollment by 13 percentage points, with most of the increase coming at four-year, relatively selective institutions. Persistence in college also increased, with a 12 percentage point increase in attending four or more semesters of higher education.

In the 2018-2019 School Quality Rating Policy results published by the Chicago Public Schools, Noble's high schools earned 10 of the 15 top ranking school slots in the district. The School Quality Rating Policy (SQRP) is the Board of Education's policy for evaluating school performance. It establishes the indicators of school performance and growth and the benchmarks against which a school's success will be evaluated on an annual basis. Through this policy, each school receives a School Quality Rating and an Accountability Status.

== Programs ==
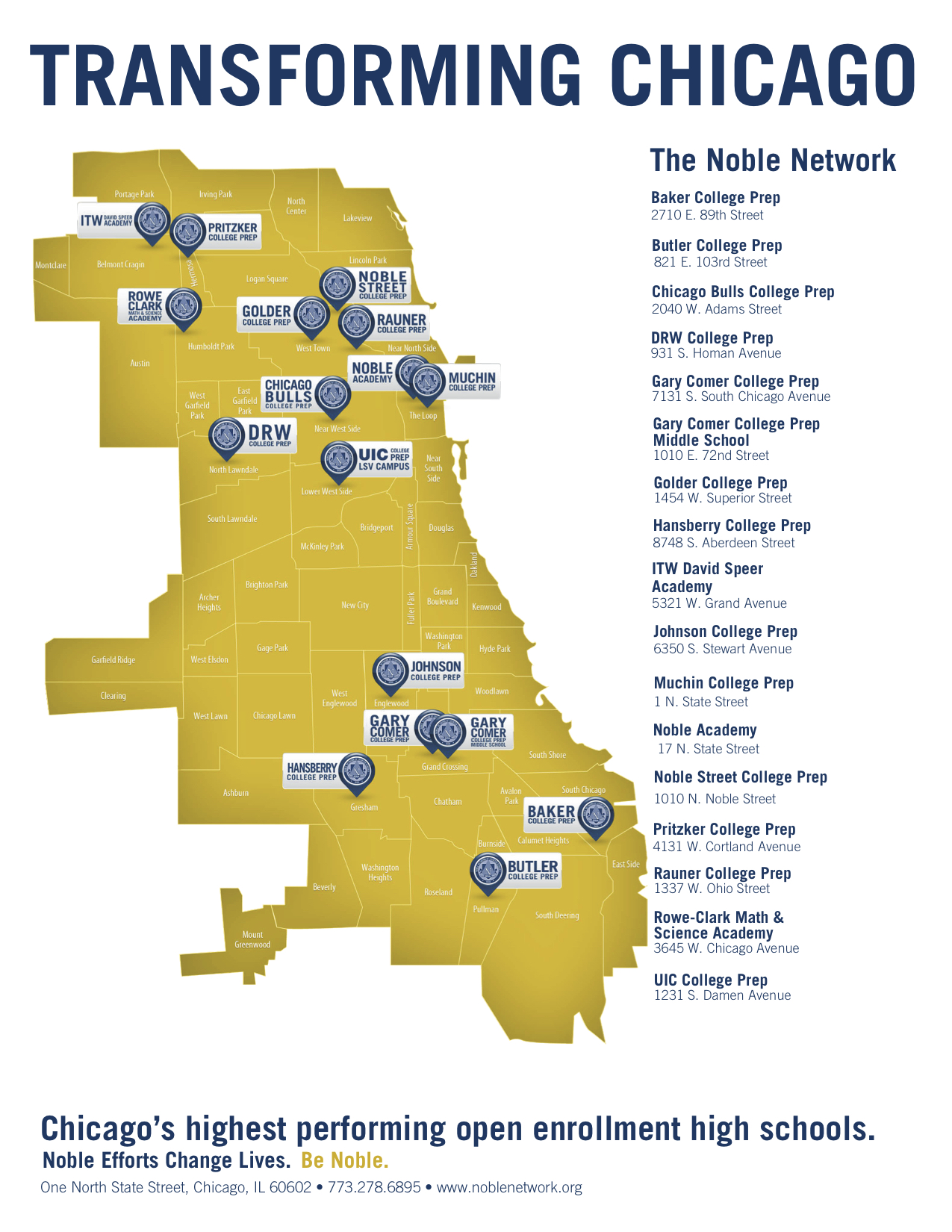
Noble Network of Charter Schools map

=== Teaching residency program ===
The Noble-Relay Teaching Residency, run in partnership with Relay Graduate School of Education, launched in the summer of 2014, provides a one-year pathway into a career as a teacher in an urban setting for Noble alumni and interested community members.

=== College counseling and alumni support ===
Noble's college counseling and alumni support program has led to students graduating from college at three to five times the national average. Noble uses college counseling tools and software to match students with the highest graduation rate schools. This system has been shared with other schools in Chicago and around the country. Each senior has a college counselor and applies to 8-10 colleges to find the right "match" school. Students can attend a college seminar course in their senior year to help them complete college, financial, and scholarship applications.

=== Summer of a Lifetime ===
The Summer of a Lifetime program allows Noble Network students to participate in classes over the summer for high school or college credit. Students also visit colleges, museums, and other educational venues. Since 1997, 4500 students have participated in the program.

=== Pritzker Access Scholarship for DREAMers ===
Since 2014 Noble has offered scholarships to undocumented students who participate in the federal DACA program. The program mirrors the financial aid that would otherwise be available to students through FAFSA. Approximately 70 undocumented Noble graduates are awarded nearly full-ride scholarships annually.

== Controversy ==
In April 2018, Noble Network of Charter Schools faced criticism for alleged disconnect from its student population and "dehumanizing" policies. Students claim that "policies [are] so strict that some girls are bleeding through their pants for lack of permitted bathroom breaks."

Teachers have also stated that policies can be culturally insensitive, such as demanding "level zero" in which teachers "shout ‘hands up’ at a hallway full of black children." During training teachers were told to "light the students up" despite the Sandra Bland incident occurring that summer. "The phrase the police officer used was ‘I’m going to light you up.’...there was no sensitivity around how we’re using that phrase," said a former teacher. The difference in demographics between teachers and students have been discussed since at least 2016. While the demographics of Chicago Public School teachers are 50% white, 23% black, and 20% latino, Noble's teachers are 66% white, 14% black, and 9% latino despite 98% minority student enrollment.

Some students and alumni claim the disciplinary culture of the Noble Network has made them unwilling to recommend schools in the charter network to friends or family.

Proponents of Noble's disciplinary code state that the school culture is set up to challenge students and set up a better educational environment. They also point to Noble students' high college acceptance rates, ACT scores higher than Chicago Public Schools, and high enrollment. The president of the Noble Network, in an email to staff, stated parts of the article were “exaggerated or plainly false.” Teachers also defend the charter system by stating there is more autonomy than in district public schools.

It has also been claimed that "Noble officials have privately suggested that teachers are publicizing discipline stories as a way to promote their unionization efforts."

== Campuses ==
- Baker College Prep (2710 E. 89th Street)
- Butler College Prep (821 E. 103rd Street)
- Chicago Bulls College Prep (2040 West Adams Street)
- DRW College Prep (931 S. Homan Avenue)
- Gary Comer College Prep (7131 South Chicago Avenue)
- Gary Comer College Prep Middle School (1010 E 72nd Street)
- Golder College Prep (1454 West Superior Street)
- Hansberry College Prep (8748 S. Aberdeen Street)
- ITW David Speer Academy (5321 W. Grand Avenue)
- Johnson College Prep (6350 South Stewart Avenue)
- Mansueto High School (2911 West 47th Street)
- Muchin College Prep (1 North State Street)
- Noble Academy (1443 N. Ogden Avenue)
- Noble Street College Prep (1010 North Noble Street)
- Pritzker College Prep (4131 West Cortland Street)
- Rauner College Prep (1337 West Ohio Street)
- Rowe-Clark Math & Science Academy (3645 West Chicago Avenue)
- UIC College Prep (1231 South Damen Avenue)
