= DRW College Prep =

Location
- 931 S. Homan Ave; Chicago, Illinois 60624; United States
- 41.8692°N 87.7104°W

Information
- School type: Public Secondary Charter
- Opened: 2012
- Principal: Tina Ellis
- Gender: Coed
- Enrollment: 466 (2017-18)
- Campus type: Urban
- Colors: Navy blue Yellow
- Website: DRW College Prep website

DRW College Prep is a public 4-year charter high school located in the Homan Square in Chicago, Illinois. It is a part of the Noble Network of Charter Schools. DRW College Prep is set to grow to a campus that will serve 800 students grades nine through twelve.
