= Mansueto High School =

Location
- 2911 W. 47th Street; Chicago, Illinois 60632; United States; 41°48′28″N 87°41′49″W

Information
- Type: Public Secondary Charter
- Established: 2016; 10 years ago
- School district: Noble Network of Charter Schools
- Superintendent: Constance Jones
- Principal: Darko Simunovic
- Staff: 115
- Grades: 9–12
- Gender: Coed
- Enrollment: 1098
- Campus type: Urban
- Colors: Gray and Yellow
- Team name: Leopards
- Website: nobleschools.org/mansueto/

Mansueto High School is a Level +1 public four-year charter high school located in Chicago, Illinois, United States. It is a part of the Noble Network of Charter Schools. It is located at West 47th street between Richmond and Mozart street in the Brighton Park neighborhood on the Southwest Side of Chicago.

It is named after donors Joe and Rika Mansueto.

Mansueto High School opened in 2016 at a temporary location (51st and Keeler) while its permanent building was under construction. The architectural firm, Wheeler and Kearns partnered with contractors, Bulley and Andrews, to construct the school. Mansueto opened at its permanent location in August 2017. In 2018, the school's design received a Brick in Architecture Award. The site was the former location of the RC bottling plant.
