= Noble Street College Prep =

Coordinates: 41°54′0.2″N 87°39′46.3″W

Location
- 1010 N. Noble St; Chicago, Illinois 60642; United States

Information
- School type: Public Secondary Charter
- Opened: 1999
- Principal: Benjamin Gunty
- Grades: 9–12
- Gender: Coed
- Enrollment: 662 (2018-19)
- Campus type: Urban
- Colors: Gold; Blue
- Website: https://nobleschools.org/noblestreet/

Noble Street College Prep (commonly known as the Original Campus) of the Noble Network of Charter Schools, is a Level +1 public four-year charter high school located in the West Town neighborhood in Chicago, Illinois. It is a part of the Noble Network of Charter Schools. Noble Street College Prep was founded by Michael and Tonya Milkie with the support of the Northwestern University Settlement Association in 1999 and is the original campus of Noble Network of Charter Schools. Noble Street College Prep serves grades nine through twelve.
