= Muchin College Prep =

Coordinates: 41.882192°N 87.627552°W

Location
- 1 N. State Street; Chicago, Illinois 60602; United States

Information
- School type: Public Secondary Charter
- Opened: 2009
- Founder: Kimberly Neal-Brannum
- Principal: Emily Mason
- Grades: 9–12
- Gender: Coed
- Enrollment: 936 (2017-2018)
- Campus type: Urban
- Colors: Teal; Gray; Black
- Website: nobleschools.org/muchin/

Muchin College Prep is a public four-year charter high school located in the Chicago Loop in Chicago, Illinois, United States. It is a part of the Noble Network of Charter Schools. It is named for Allan and Elaine Muchin. Muchin College Prep was founded in 2009 by Kimberly Neal-Brannum. The Founding Principal, Kimberly Neal-Brannum led the school until 2015.

The science labs at Muchin were also funded by Michael and Karyn Lutz, and Baxter International has been an active partner, contributing to the growth of the science labs and providing career exploration programs as well as scholarships for Muchin alumni.

Muchin has earned a 1+ school rating since 2014 when Chicago Public Schools began issuing such ratings. Based on 2017-2018 school year data, Muchin earned an SQRP total score of a 4.7, making the school the top 9th-12th grade only high school in Chicago.
