= The Nine Lives of Fritz the Cat =

- Theatrical release poster
- Directed by: Robert Taylor
- Screenplay by: Robert Taylor; Fred Halliday; Eric Monte
- Based on: Fritz the Cat by Robert Crumb
- Produced by: Steve Krantz
- Starring: Skip Hinnant; Reva Rose; Bob Holt; Peter Leeds; Louisa Moritz; Eric Monte
- Edited by: Marshall M. Borden
- Music by: Tom Scott & The L.A. Express
- Production companies: Steve Krantz Productions; Cine Camera
- Distributed by: American International Pictures
- Release date: June 26, 1974
- Running time: 76 minutes
- Country: United States
- Language: English
- Budget: $1.5 million
- Box office: $3 million

The Nine Lives of Fritz the Cat is a 1974 American adult animated anthology black comedy film directed by Robert Taylor as a sequel to Ralph Bakshi's Fritz the Cat (1972), adapted from the comic strip by Robert Crumb, neither of whom had any involvement in the making of the film. The only two people involved in the first film to work on the sequel were voice actor Skip Hinnant, and producer Steve Krantz. The film's score was composed by musician Tom Scott, and performed by Scott and his band The L.A. Express.

Like the first film, The Nine Lives of Fritz the Cat focuses on Fritz (voiced by Hinnant), a fraudulent womanizer and leftist, who is shown in this film to have married an ill-tempered woman, with whom he shares an apartment room with their infant son. Unlike the first film, The Nine Lives of Fritz the Cat adopts a non-linear narrative and is presented as an anthology of loosely connected short stories, connected as cannabis-induced fantasies which occur as she berates Fritz. The stories depict him as a Nazi stormtrooper, a rich playboy, an astronaut heading to Mars, and in an alternate reality in which New Jersey has seceded from the United States as an entirely African American state. Except for the wraparound segment, none of the film's storylines are based on Robert Crumb's comics, and he was not credited on this film.

The film was written by Taylor, in collaboration with Fred Halliday and Eric Monte. The voice cast also featured Bob Holt, Peter Leeds, Louisa Moritz, Robert Ridgely, Joan Gerber, Jay Lawrence, Stanley Adams, Pat Harrington Jr., Peter Hobbs, Ralph James, Eric Monte, Glynn Turman, Gloria Jones, Renny Roker, John Hancock, Chris Graham and Felton Perry.

In contrast to the first film receiving an X rating, the sequel got an R rating, being the first American animated film to do so, and cementing the Fritz films as the holders of the first animated films to receive both ratings.

== Plot ==
In the 1970s, Fritz has graduated from college and is now married, on unemployment benefits and has a son named Ralphie, who often masturbates. As his wife berates him for his irresponsibility, Fritz smokes cannabis and imagines himself in nine different other lives.

In his first life, he meets his Puerto Rican friend Juan the camel and they discuss about Juan's sister Chita. At Juan's house, Chita complains about the odor of Fritz's cannabis, but is persuaded into smoking it. The drug sends Chita into arousal and she and Fritz have sex. Meanwhile, a pair of crows intending to rob the house change their minds and watch the pair. Their sex is interrupted by Chita's father, who shoots Fritz dead. The violent scene turns off the two crows who decide to come back another time.

In his second life, Fritz meets a drunken bum claiming to be God.

In his third life, Fritz is a soldier in Nazi Germany. After being caught having a ménage à trois with a commanding officer's wife and daughter, Fritz escapes and winds up being an orderly to Adolf Hitler. Fritz takes the form of a therapist, and analyzes Hitler, telling him that his world domination plans were just a way of getting attention. In the showers, Hitler "accidentally" drops his bar of soap and urges Fritz to pick it up for him, in an attempt to rape him, and ends up getting his single testicle blown off. Fritz is killed by an American tanker.

In his fourth life, Fritz attempts to sell a used condom to a liquor store owner named Niki. As the pair chat, Niki learns that his wife caught gonorrhoea from Fritz, angering him. Leaving the store, Fritz tells a passerby that he was an irresistible stud in the 1930s.

Fritz's fifth life is a psychedelic montage of old stock film and animation, vaguely illustrating Fritz's downfall in the 1930s (losing everything to excessive partying and drinking).

In his sixth life, Fritz tries to cash a welfare check with Morris, a Jewish toad who owns a pawn shop. Fritz offers Morris a deal: if Morris cashes Fritz's welfare check, then Fritz will give Morris a toilet seat. Morris initially refuses, but a sudden onset of diarrhea from the pickles he had been eating pushes him to accept. Instead of cashing Fritz's welfare check, he gives Fritz a space helmet.

Fritz envisions himself as a NASA astronaut in his seventh life and prepares for the first mission to Mars. During an interview with journalists, Fritz invites a crow reporter into the space shuttle to have sex. However, the shuttle takes off earlier than planned and it explodes in space.

In Fritz's eighth life, he sees the ghost of his dead friend, Duke. In the future, Henry Kissinger (who is represented a rat) has become the president and grants independence to New Jersey, which is renamed "New Africa". Fritz works as a courier and must deliver a letter to the president of New Africa. In New Africa's "Black House", the vice president assassinates the president and frames Fritz for the deed. A war breaks out between America and New Africa, Kissinger declares an unconditional surrender, and Fritz is executed.

In his final life, Fritz finds himself living in the sewers of New York, where he meets an Indian guru and Lucifer himself (who is represented as a purple cat with wings, horns, and a devil-like tail).

However, Fritz is snapped out of his drug-induced fantasies by his wife, who finally throws Fritz out of their apartment to get him to improve their family for her. After a quick look at all of his lives, Fritz declares this life to be the worst and then leaves.

== Cast ==
Main

- Skip Hinnant as Fritz the Cat
- Reva Rose as Gabrielle
- Bob Holt as God / NASA Assistant / American Chairman / Additional Voices
- Peter Leeds as Juan / Additional Voices
- Louisa Moritz as Chita
- Eric Monte as Duke the Crow

1970s

- Robert Ridgely as The Devil / Additional Voices
- Fred Smoot
- Dick Whittington
- Luke Walker

Hitler

- Larry Moss
- Joan Gerber as Han's wife
- Jim Johnson
- Jay Lawrence
- Stanley Adams
- Pat Harrington Jr.
- Carole Androsky as Han's daughter
- Peter Hobbs as American General

Astronaut

- Lynn Roman as Reporter
- Ralph James as Golf Oil President

New Africa

- Eric Monte
- Glynn Turman
- Ron Knight
- Gloria Jones
- Renny Roker
- Peter Hobbs
- Buddy Arett
- John Hancock
- Chris Graham
- Felton Perry
- Anthony Mason
- Sarina C. Grant as The Roach

== Production ==
The only two people involved in the first film to work on the sequel were Skip Hinnant, who reprises his role as the eponymous protagonist, and producer Steve Krantz. Ralph Bakshi had written and directed Fritz the Cat in 1972, but did not want to direct a sequel, and had absolutely no involvement with the film. However, Bakshi sometimes incorrectly has been credited as having worked on the film, such as in Jeff Lenburg's Who's Who in Animated Cartoons, which claims that Bakshi had been a producer on the film. The concept of a sequel to Fritz the Cat was a point of contention between Bakshi and Krantz, as Bakshi wanted to end his film with Fritz's death, and Krantz wanted Fritz to live at the end, to leave room for sequels.

For the sequel, Krantz hired animator Robert Taylor to direct. Taylor had worked on The Mighty Heroes, a superhero spoof Bakshi created in the 1960s. Stylistically, Taylor attempted to recreate only some of the elements and themes of the original film. The setting of the film's period is similar to that of the first film, with the speaker addressing the audience with "jump back, baby." However, unlike the first film, The Nine Lives of Fritz the Cat was made during the era in which it was set. Because the filmmakers only had three years of history to work with, much of the film diverges into various storytelling directions, including sections focusing on the 1930s, Nazi Germany, and an alternate future. The film's ending credits play over animation of Fritz dancing down the street in tune with Tom Scott's music.

Taylor cowrote the film's screenplay with Fred Halliday and Eric Monte. Steve Krantz would later produce Monte's screenplay Cooley High, which was developed into the television sitcom What's Happening!! The film's title has been seen as ironic, as the character's creator Robert Crumb had previously drawn a story in which the character was killed. Crumb's comics were not generally used as the basis for the screenplay, except for the wraparound segment, and Crumb was not credited on this film, unlike the first film.

The music for this film was performed by Tom Scott and the L.A. Express.

== Release ==
The film premiered at the 1974 Cannes Film Festival. Taylor was nominated for the Palme d'Or.

The film later achieved a cult following.

=== Media ===
A full soundtrack album was planned for official release, but the album never came out because of the film's failure. However, a 45 RPM single featuring two songs from the film, "Jump Back," and "TCB in E" was released in 1974.

Both Fritz the Cat films are available on DVD through MGM Home Entertainment in the U.S., and Arrow Films in the UK as part of a DVD box set titled The Fritz the Cat Collection.

=== Reception ===
Time Out described the film as being "woefully inept".

Bakshi later contrasted Taylor's efforts to how his film might have turned out if prospective distributor Warner Bros. had been allowed to tone down the content of the film, and stated in a 2008 interview that Robert Crumb does not acknowledge The Nine Lives of Fritz the Cat because "He would have to say, 'Well, Ralph did do a better picture than Nine Lives.' So to Robert Crumb, there is no Nine Lives. It doesn't exist." Crumb had in fact acknowledged the sequel in the documentary The Confessions of Robert Crumb (1987).

== See also ==
- List of American films of 1974
