= Dantrell =

Dantrell is a given name. Notable people with the given name include:

- Dantrell Davis (1985–1992), American murder victim
- Dantrell Savage (born 1985), American football player

== See also ==
- Dontrell
- Dontrelle
