= History of education in Chicago =

History of education in Chicago covers the schools of the city since the 1830s. It includes all levels as well as public, private and parochial schools. For the recent history since the 1970s see Chicago Public Schools

== 19th century ==
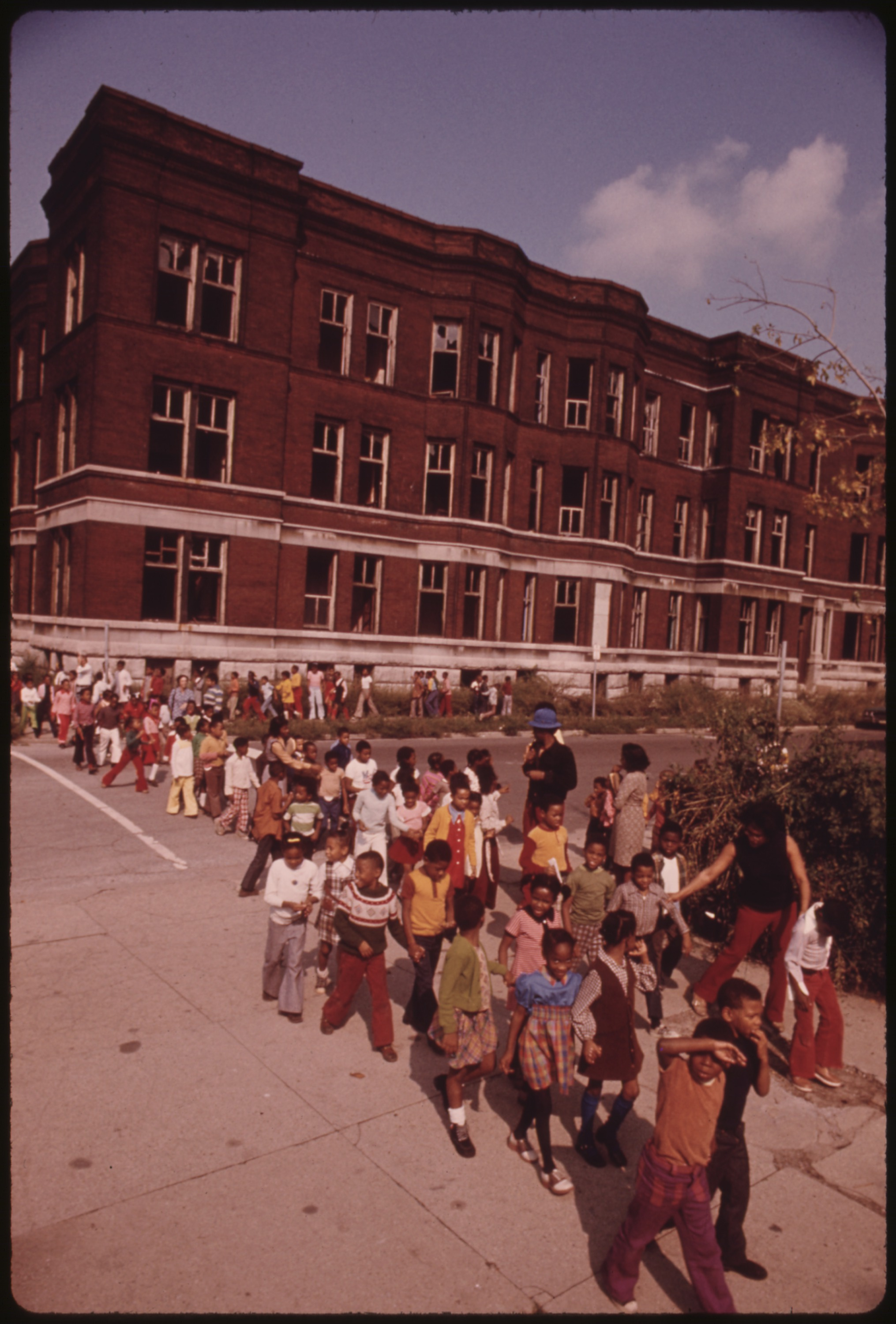
Children returning to class following a fire drill at a Chicago elementary school, 1973. Photo by John H. White.

According to John L. Rury, the first small private schools were established as Chicago began to expand in the late 1830s. Eliza Chappell was probably the city's first public school teacher, but most teachers were young men from New England. All the schools were makeshift with rudimentary facilities that served only a fraction of the city's children. As late as the 1860s one teacher would supervise classes numbering a hundred or more, with his students ranging in age from 4 to 17. Schoolhouses were adapted from existing structures. When Chicago received its charter in 1837, volunteer examiners were appointed to oversee the schools, but funding remained meager. In 1845, an inspector reported schools housed in temporary quarters, crowded, poorly equipped, and foul-smelling. The first public school building was erected in 1845 and ridiculed as “Miltimore's Folly,” after a teacher who had suggested its necessity. In 1848, Mayor James Hutchinson Woodworth argued the urgent need for a better public school system. The city council agreed. The mayor's plea reflected his experience as a former teacher, and was designed to attract productive citizens. By 1850, less than a fifth of eligible children were enrolled in public schools. Larger numbers attended private and parochial schools, but thousands did not enroll at all, particularly older children. Public school classes remained large, often conducted in poorly maintained rooms and with inadequate materials. Parents who could afford better education usually hired private tutors. Chicago's population expanded with tens of thousands of new arrivals annually from the East and from Europe. In 1835 the state legislature authorized a public school system with taxpayer financing, and the city's 1837 charter strengthened the scaffolding. Chicago rapidly opened public elementary schools, for grades 1–8. By 1848 there were 8 teachers and 818 students. John Clark Dore, a Boston teacher and principal, became Chicago's first school superintendent in 1854, when there were 34 teachers and 3,000 students. When he resigned in 1856, enrollment had doubled to 6,100, 46 new instructors had been hired, and four new schools (including the first high school) had been constructed. Annual salaries were $500 for men and $250 for women. To save money the schools began hiring young women who wanted to teach before they married and had to resign. To train the teachers the city established "normal school" programs—a two-year course for graduates of 8th grade. The handful of new 4-year high schools also offered 2-year normal curricula. Typical was Ella Flagg Young; her family arrived in 1858 from Buffalo, New York. In 1860, at age 15, she entered the Chicago Normal School, graduating in 1862, she taught for three years as an elementary teacher. Instead of marriage she embarked on a career in administration. In 1865 she was appointed director of the small pre-collegiate "practice school" newly opened at Scammon School.

== Progressive theories of education ==
Francis Wayland Parker (1837–1902), John Dewey (1859–1952), Ella Flagg Young (1845–1918), Jane Addams (1860–1935) and William Wirt (1874–1938) were five of the nation's most influential educational theorists of the late 19th and early 20th centuries. Each was based in Chicago around 1900 and influenced many disciples there. They played decisive roles in shaping what was known as Progressive Education in Chicago. Thanks to them Chicago played a central role in defining the educational ambitions of the Progressive Movement nationwide.

Parker studied in Germany and became a superintendent in Massachusetts where he developed his Quincy Method, which eliminated harsh discipline and de-emphasized rote memorization, replacing them with elements of progressive education, such as group activities, the teaching of the arts and sciences, and informal methods of instruction. He rejected tests, grading and ranking systems. As principal of the Cook County Normal School in Chicago (1883–99) he experimented with ways to expand and develop his curriculum. For example, reading, spelling, and writing were merged into a new subject called "communication." Art and physical education were added to the curriculum. He taught science through the study of nature. In 1899, Parker founded and served as principal (1899–1901) for a private experimental school, the Chicago Institute, which became the School of Education of the University of Chicago in 1901.

John Dewey ranged widely over the main topics of philosophy, but he returned again and again to the nature of education in an ideal society, and that was his main concern during his years in Chicago (1894–1904) at the University of Chicago . He worked there with Ella Flagg Young and founded the University of Chicago Laboratory Schools, where his disciples tested his ideas in actual classrooms.

Ella Flagg Young was superintendent of Chicago Public Schools. 1909–1915, where she operationalized Dewey's progressivism. She was the first woman to head a large city school system—it had 290,000 enrolled students and owned property worth $50,000,000. Her salary of $10,000 was the highest any woman had received in a government job in the U.S. She also served as the first woman president of the National Education Association. She was a professor of education at the University of Chicago (1899–1905); became principal of the Chicago Normal School (1905–1909); she served on the Illinois State Board of Education from 1888 to 1913. She published extensively on Deweyite themes.

William Wirt, the superintendent in nearby Gary, Indiana, won national acclaim for his Gary Plan. It set up a two platoon system so that twice as many students could use the same facilities, which were expanded to include shops, labs, auditoriums and playgrounds. Wirt learned Dewey's ideas while he was in graduate school in Chicago and tried to put them in action. Dewey and other educators highly praised the experiment, while business admired the cost efficiency. Labor union objections were overruled and in the 1920s Chicago was using the platoon system in some schools.

Chicago-style educational theorizing influenced intellectuals across the nation, but it was less convincing to school superintendents and school board members who had to make daily decisions about the shape and budget of schooling. They paid more attention to business oriented progressivism, which emphasized administrative efficiency as measured by low taxes. As sociologists discovered, "In the struggle between quantitative administrative efficiency and qualitative educational goals...th big guns are all on the side of ...the former." On the other hand, in elite private schools with high tuitions, satisfaction of the wealthy parents is decisive, and the intellectuals like Dewey prevailed.

=== Progressive reforms attempted under Mayor Dunne 1905-1907 ===
The seven members of Board of Education appointed by Mayor Edward Dunne, a Democrat, included Progressive Party leaders in 1912 like Jane Addams. Its reforms were reversed by the conservative Republican mayor Fred A. Busse in 1908. Nevertheless, the reforms played a pivotal role in early 20th-century educational debates by challenging the prevailing "administrative progressive" approach that emphasized efficiency, centralized authority, and strong superintendents—an approach that paralleled the broader city manager movement in American governance The board served as a microcosm of progressive ideals, advocating for:.

- Labor Rights: Support for teacher unions and broader labor organizations.
- Decentralized Decision-Making: Emphasis on community input rather than top-down control.
- Transparency: Promotion of openness in teacher promotions and textbook contracts.
- Inclusion: Efforts to diversify community representation on boards and commissions.
- The Dunne Board stood out for its diverse composition, breaking from the tradition of male business leaders dominating Chicago's educational governance. Women actively challenged male-dominated structures. Labor Representatives amplified working-class voices on school issues. Social Reformers included individuals committed to progressive causes. These reformers members formed overlapping networks, often rooted in "Social Gospel" Protestantism, and allied with labor and immigrant groups—most notably Margaret Haley and the Teachers' Federation—in opposition to the propertied elite.

The board prioritized practical reforms such as improved teacher salaries and greater teacher involvement in decision-making, reducing the superintendent's power. Its support for the Teachers’ Federation was a dramatic new factor in Chicago affairs. The new Teacher Advisory Councils embraced participatory democracy by valuing teachers’ classroom experience in policy decisions. Although most of the Dunne Board's reforms were quickly reversed, they left a lasting legacy. Concepts such as teachers’ councils are now widely accepted as mechanisms for professional input. The board's commitment to open debate and public participation is reflected in today's open meeting acts, demonstrating that their vision for a democratic educational system ultimately prevailed.

== Catholic parochial schools ==
Almost half the Chicago population was Catholic by the 1920s. Many children—perhaps half—attended public schools. The risk of exposure to Protestant proselytizing was minimal since over a third of the public school teachers were Catholics, along with almost as many principals. The parishes built their own schools, using sisters (who had taken vows of poverty) as inexpensive teachers. German and Polish parents appreciated that the schools taught most classes in their own language. Cardinal George Mundelein (archbishop 1915–1939) centralized control of the parish schools in his own hands. His building committee decided where new schools would be located, while his school board standardized curricula, textbooks, teacher training, testing, and educational policy. Simultaneously he gained a voice in city hall, and Catholic William J. Bogan was Superintendent of public schools, 1928 to 1936.

Between 1900 and 1930, Catholic elementary school enrollment saw a significant increase, tripling from 15,000 to 45,000. This growth continued despite the Great Depression of the 1930s, with Catholics supporting 264 grammar schools and 59 secondary schools (28 for girls, 14 for boys, and 17 coed) by 1942. While women's colleges faced challenges, older institutions like Loyola and DePaul experienced growth after World War II due to returning veterans using the GI Bill for a free college education. Enrollment in Catholic schools peaked during the 1950s baby boom, but schools in older industrial areas and the South and West Sides faced demographic shifts. Notably, parochial schools welcomed Black children—most of them Protestant—becoming a vital resource for poor Black families. The Archdiocese of Chicago has closed over half of its urban schools since 1966. By 2002, Chicago's Catholic elementary and high schools had a combined enrollment of 62,000 students across 139 elementary and 25 high schools.

== Depression and recovery, 1929–1945 ==
The Great Depression in the United States hit Chicago hard. Unemployment reached 25% in 1932, and city revenues plunged. Local taxes went unpaid and by the summer of 1931, the Chicago School Board had defaulted on 24 payrolls, owing over $15 million. Instead of cash, the Board began paying teachers in scrip, a form of IOU that the teachers' union warned might be illegal. While some businesses like Commonwealth Edison accepted the scrip, many merchants did not. Teachers took out high-interest loans or found other ways to convert the scrip to cash. They actively protested, holding a large meeting in January 1932 and presenting petitions to the Illinois State Legislature, signed by over 900,000 voters, to restore public credit so they could be paid. The Chicago Daily News highlighted the dire situation, reporting instances of teachers fainting from lack of food and noting a significant increase in families needing assistance through their aid fund.

The national government stepped in to help. New Deal programs hired the unemployed, the WPA built 30 new schools at no cost to the city, and the NYA operated its own high schools. However, the New Deal did not directly fund the public schools. Tight budgets in Chicago meant that some programs were reduced (especially the new junior college system); teachers and staff were laid off; and salary scales were cut. Fewer students dropped out because they could not find jobs.

In 1937, the city was hit by a polio outbreak which resulted in the Chicago Board of Health ordering schools to be closed during what was supposed to be the start of the school year. The school closure wound up lasting three weeks. Superintendent William Johnson and assistant superintendent Minnie Fallon managed to provide the instruction to the city's elementary school students by providing at-home distance education through radio broadcasts. This defensive precaution closed public schools to all students in grades 8 and below, the age group most at risk. Over 350,000 students participated in the weeks-long morning broadcasts, keeping homework assignments in notebooks to be audited when schools resumed. Some review articles described these broadcasts as "the first large-scale 'radio school' experiment" (Foss, 2020), but The American School of the Air program had begun its nation-wide broadcasting in 1930 to an inaugural audience estimated at 1,500,000 pupils from 20,000 schools.

== Racial issues ==
The history of Black schools and education in Chicago is marked by cycles of segregation, activism, and partial reform. Despite early efforts at integration and repeated advocacy by Black communities, structural racism and policy decisions have maintained deep educational divides that continued to shape the experiences of Black students in Chicago in the 21st century.

In the earliest days of Chicago's public schools (1837–1860s), Black and White children sometimes attended classes together, as the city's school system initially assigned students to the nearest schoolhouse without explicit segregation. By the late 1850s, pressure to segregate grew as the Black population increased. In 1863, following debates about overcrowding, the city established a separate school for Black children, despite opposition from both Black residents and some city officials.

Efforts to end school segregation, known as the Chicago Freedom Movement, peaked in the 1960s focusing on reversing the stand-pat policies of Superintendent Benjamin Willis. Although Mayor Richard J. Daley had been reelected because of solid Black support, in this conflict he supported Willis. In 1963, tensions rose as the growing Black population faced overcrowded and inadequate schools in their segregated neighborhoods compared poorly to the underutilized better equipped schools in white ethnic neighborhoods Mayor Daley experienced this firsthand when he was jeered by both Black and white hecklers at an NAACP rally in July 1963 due to the outrage over segregated and overcrowded schools. This led to direct action, including a sit-in at the Chicago Board of Education by the Congress on Racial Equality (CORE) on July 10, 1963. Neighborhood protests escalated, highlighting the disparity between white schools with empty classrooms and Black schools using mobile classrooms—ridiculed as "Willis Wagons" to accommodate overcrowding. Willis remained firm in his position, leading to further protests within Black neighborhoods. On October 22, 1963, Black leaders organized school boycott to protest the school board's rejection of Willis's resignation, resulting in 225,000 African American students staying home for one-day "Freedom Schools" were set up in churches and community centers. While Northwest and Southwest Side whites supported Willis, this boycott galvanized Chicago's Black community, leading the Coordinating Council of Community Organizations (CCCO) to emerge as the main leader in civil rights protests. The CCCO organized another boycott in February 1964 with similar turnout but defiance from Daley. The school board renewed Willis's contract in May 1965, prompting even the usually moderate NAACP to call for another boycott. On June 10, 1965, despite a court injunction, over 100,000 Black children stayed home from school for a day. Daley met with protestors, but no significant changes in school policy occurred. The struggle continued, with civil rights leaders viewing Willis as a figurehead for Daley's political organization. In 1965, six thousand people marched against the school board's policies. Eventually, the situation drew the attention of Martin Luther King Jr.. In July 1965 he decided to make the city the focus of a northern civil rights movement. However, King primarily concentrated on housing segregation and his efforts regarding desegregation were ultimately unsuccessful due to Daley's political maneuvering. Furthermore, the biracial civil rights coalition disintegrated and CCCO disbanded.

Elizabeth Todd-Breland argues that Black education reformers in Chicago developed community-driven strategies in the late 20th century to address systemic inequities, but these efforts collided with neoliberal reforms that prioritized privatization and corporate models, exposing enduring tensions between racial justice and market-based policies.

== 1980 to present ==
According to Dorothy Shipps, complaints about poor schools were accumulating rapidly. In September 1987, the Chicago Teachers Union went on strike for nineteen days. Then in November 1987, Republican William Bennett, President Reagan's Secretary of Education, stated that Chicago public schools were the worst in the nation. Reform to enable better learning opportunities was emphatically demanded by the Chicago Tribune after its expose campaign regarding the poor quality of public schools. The state legislature responded in 1988. A new law reshaped the governance of Chicago Public Schools (CPS) by decentralizing significant authority away from the central office. It created Local School Councils (LSCs) in each of the 550 public schools in Chicago. These LSCs gained the power to hire and fire their school's principal, and to approve both the school's budget and its plan for improvement. Additional reforms in 1995 left LSCs in place but created a powerful new district management structure. This team, operating with a corporate-style board and a chief executive officer, reported directly to the mayor. Its mandate included identifying struggling schools and the power to hire, fire and reassign teachers and even to disband an poorly performing LSC. Furthermore, this new management team could implement cost-saving measures, including privatization, and modify collective bargaining agreements to enhance efficiency. A dramatic innovation was the policy of "no social promotion." It meant all students had to achieve a certain minimum score on standardized tests to advance to the next grade. This reform shifted the dominant theme from the "parent power" of 1988 to a new focus on "accountability." In 1998 President Bill Clinton praised the Chicago plan as a model of reform for the nation.

== See also ==
- Chicago Public Schools
- List of colleges and universities in Chicago
- List of schools of the Roman Catholic Archdiocese of Chicago
- University of Chicago Laboratory Schools

== Primary sources ==
- Bickford, Charles W. “Visiting Chicago Schools.—(I).” The Journal of Education, vol. 55, no. 21, 1902, pp. 327–28. online, a six-part series
  - “Visiting Chicago Schools.—(II).” The Journal of Education, vol. 55, no. 22, 1902, p. 344. online
- Chicago Public Schools. Survey of Chicago Public schools, 1914 (1914) online
- Clark, Hannah Belle. The public schools of Chicago, a sociological study (1897) online
- Counts, George S. School and Society in Chicago (1928) online
- "Free Public Schools of Chicago" Eclectic Journal of Education and Literary Review (January 15, 1851). 2#20 online
- Havighurst, Robert J. The public schools of Chicago: a survey for the Board of Education of the City of Chicago (1964). online
- Henry, Nelson B. “Financial Support and Administration of the Chicago Public Schools.” The Elementary School Journal 32#7 1932, pp. 495–503. online
- Strayer, George D. et al. Report of the Survey of the Schools of Chicago, Illinois (5 vols, Teachers College, Columbia University, 1932)
- Thompson, George J., et al. “Chicago Schools in the Eyes of the Committee of the Federation of Labor.” The Journal of Education, vol. 55, no. 15, 1902, pp. 231–43. online
- White, Robert. “The Extra-Curriculum in the Public High Schools of Chicago.” The School Review 34#2 1937, pp. 112–22. online
- online reports and studies
