= Ella Flagg Young =

American suffragette (1845–1918)

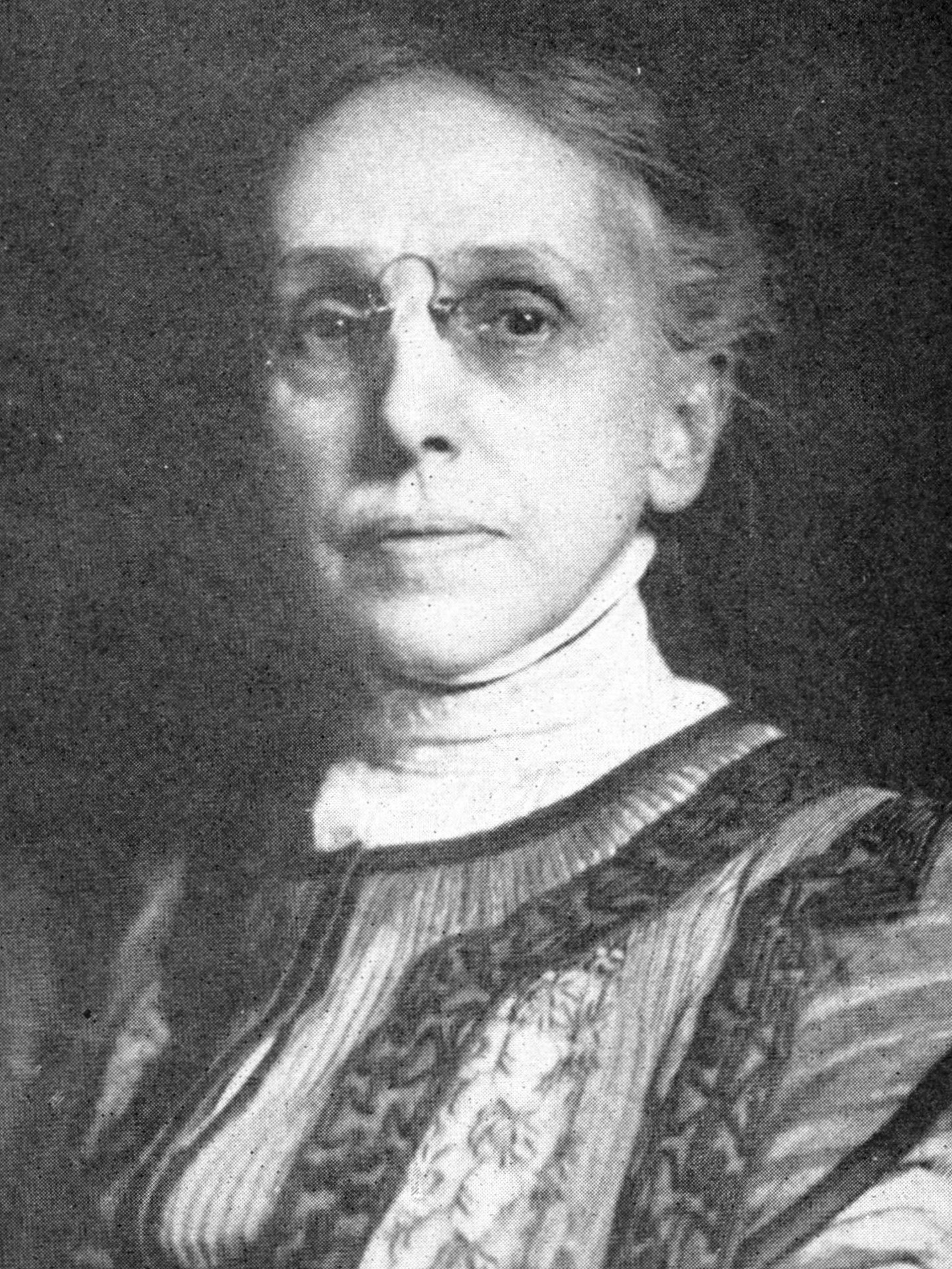
- Ella Flagg Young, c. 1910

9th Superintendent of Chicago Public Schools
- In office August 2, 1909 – December 1915
- Preceded by: Edwin G. Cooley
- Succeeded by: John Shoop

Personal details
- Born: Ella Flagg; January 15, 1845 Buffalo, New York
- Died: October 26, 1918 (aged 73) Washington, D.C.
- Spouse: William Young (m. 1868; died 1873)
- Education: Chicago Normal School; University of Chicago
- Occupation: Educator
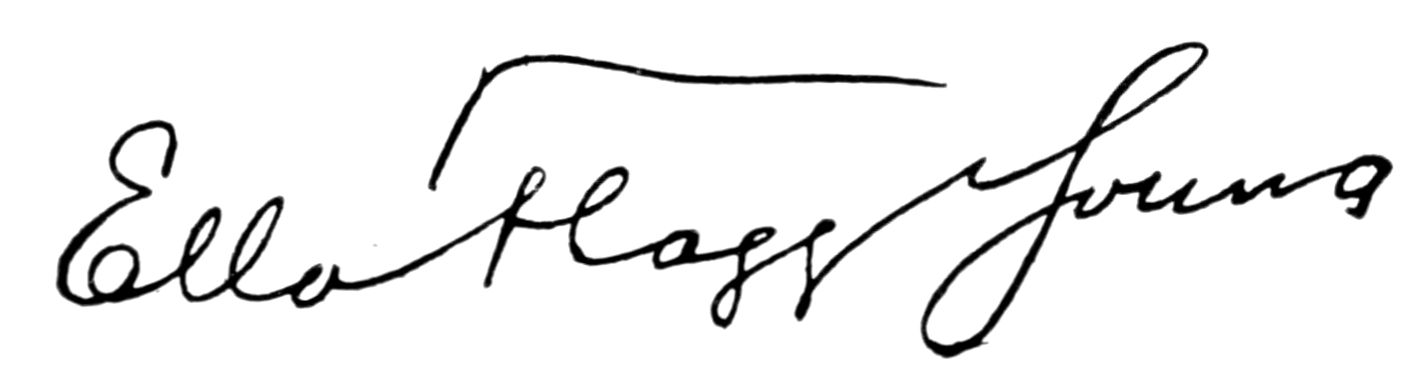
- Signature

Ella Flagg Young (January 15, 1845 – October 26, 1918) was an American educator who served as superintendent of Chicago Public Schools. She was the first female head of a large United States city school system. She also served as the first female president of the National Education Association.

== Early life and education ==
Ella Flagg was born January 15, 1845, in Buffalo, New York to Theodore and Jane (Reed) Flagg. Her parents were American-born, and of Scottish descent. Flagg was the youngest of three children.

She did not attend school until the age of ten, but had, by then, already taught herself how to read and write. After only a few months she dropped out because she wasn't being intellectually challenged and because of the lack of support from her parents. At age 15, she took the certification examination to become a teacher and passed but was told she was too young to be a teacher. She was told she would never make it as a teacher by her mother but persevered and decided to set up her own practicum to test her potential in the classroom. She decided the classroom was right for her.

She graduated in 1862 from the Chicago Normal School. She later studied part-time at the University of Chicago under John Dewey in 1895, and received her Ph.D. in 1900. Her dissertation was published under the title Isolation in the School.

== Career ==
Young's career as an educator began in 1862. Young devoted her life to her teaching career, which spanned 53 years (1862–1915). She became professor of education at the University of Chicago in 1899, holding the position until 1905. She became principal of the Chicago Normal School in 1905; and was superintendent of schools of Chicago from 1909 until her resignation in 1915. She served on the Illinois State Board of Education from 1888 to 1913.

In 1910, the membership of the National Education Association elected her its first woman president. Her election had come with the backing of Margaret Haley, head of the Chicago Teachers Federation.

Young was a prominent figure in the progressive movement. Young identified strongly with the women's suffrage movement.

Young was a significant influence on John Dewey's thinking when he authored The School and Society.

Young was also an editor of bi-monthly education publications. She also published two volumes for the University of Chicago in 1902 as part of a series which also included her 1900 dissertation. In 1903, she and John Dewey, along with a group of other scholars (James Rowland Angell, George Herbert Mead, E. W. Moore, and James Hayden Tufts) published a series of monographs in the university's Decennial Publications. This series led William James to declare that there was a Chicago "school of thought". Young was the only one of them to write directly about education in this series. The series would play an important role in the development of the democratic and pragmatic movement in American education.

=== Chicago Public Schools ===
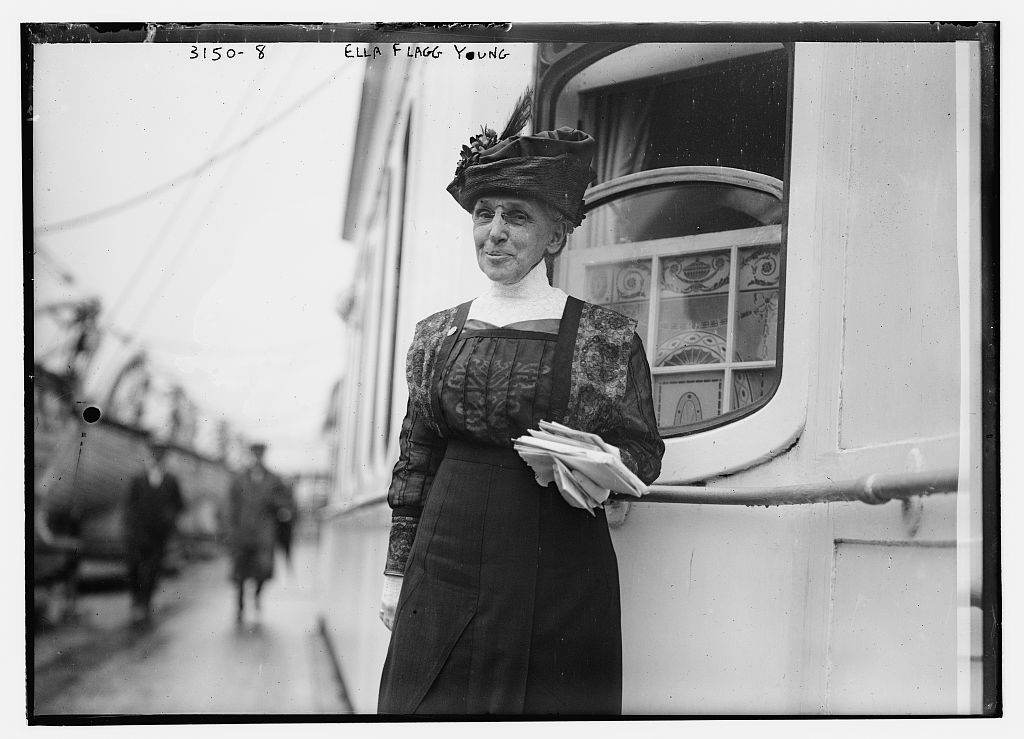
Circa 1914

She began teaching elementary school in 1862. She then served as the principal of the new practice school of the Chicago Normal School from 1865 through 1871. She afterwards worked as a high school mathematics teacher. Her innovative methods at the practice school, as well as her tenure as a high school mathematics teacher, led to her appointment as a principal.

From 1876 through 1888, she was the principal of elementary schools. Even though female applicants for principalships were not required to take the exam that male applicants were, Young insisted on taking the exam, and passed at the head of the list. This led to her appointment at one of the city's largest elementary schools, instead of one of the small primary schools that women were typically assigned to when they were made principals. She was first made principal of Scammon School in 1876, and three years later being promoted to principal of Skinner School (one of the city's biggest and most prestigious elementary schools). Young received a reputation for giving teachers at Skinner School the liberty to devise their own teaching methods. She was fond of saying, "no one can work in another's harness". She also ran faculty study groups on subjects such as Greek drama and English literature. She managed to successfully dismiss an incompetent school engineer, and was the first recorded Chicago principal who managed to do so without the engineer being reinstated.

The style of administration she practiced received praise, including from Mayor Carter Harrison III, who called the Skinner School under Young's leadership, "the most effective social institution in the city". Harrison's neighborhood lay in the area served by Skinner School. In addition, Harrison's son, Carter Harrison IV (who himself would serve as mayor) would also offer praise of Young during her career.

From 1887 through 1889, Young was a district superintendent Chicago Public Schools. She gave teachers in her district a role in decision-making on matters concerning them, the first practical application of the idea of teachers' councils, which she had written about in her University of Chicago thesis. This was a brand-new practice in education.

Young was principal of the Chicago Normal School from 1905 until becoming appointed superintendent of Chicago Public Schools in 1909.

==== Superintendency ====
On July 30, 1909, the Chicago Board of Education voted to appoint Young Chicago Public Schools' superintendent. She took office on August 2. She was the first woman in America to head a large city school system. At the time, the school district had 290,000 enrolled students and owned property worth $50,000,000. It was said that no woman had ever held such an important public office in the United States before. With an annual salary of $10,000, she was paid more than any woman had ever been paid for a public service position.

She was the school superintendent who during the 1911 spring break requested all schoolchildren in the Chicago area to organize neighborhood searches for five-year-old Elsie Paroubek, who had disappeared April 8 of that year.

In 1913, Young tendered her resignation. After controversy arose, with protest against her departure being led by Jane Addams and others, she was reappointed to the position.

Young permanently resigned from the position in 1915.

== Personal life and death ==
In 1868, she married merchant William Young. They had no children together. William died in 1873. Young's mother died in 1862, and her brother died in 1868. Her father and brother both died within a year of her husband's death. This left her with no immediate relatives.

She died in the 1918 flu pandemic, on October 26, 1918, in Washington, D.C., at the age of 73. She was the last remaining member of her family line. She left an estate valued at $60,000. On October 28, 1918, Chicago flew its flags at half-mast and draped the Chicago Board of Education's board room in black in recognition of Young's passing.

== Legacy ==
The University of Illinois honored her with the degree of LL.D.

=== Eponymous school ===
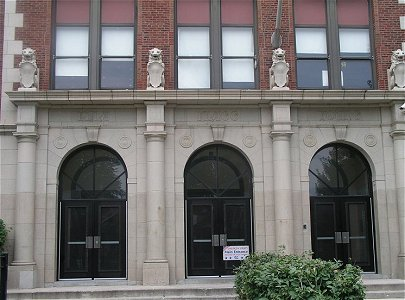
The front of the Ella Flagg Young Elementary School

The Chicago Public School system named an elementary school (K-8) in honor of Dr. Young in 1924. The school is located in the north Austin neighborhood and continues to be used as an elementary school.

The school is traditional masonry construction, with a central boiler heating system. In 1998, an addition was built to the school almost doubling the usable floorspace, and the masonry was renovated and the windows were glazed.

== Publications ==
- Isolation in the School (1900)
- Ethics in the School (1902)
- Some Types of Modern Educational Theory (1902)

She also founded and edited The Educational Bi-Monthly, a free journal for teachers.

== See also ==
- History of education in Chicago
