= Edwin G. Cooley =

American teacher (1857-1923)

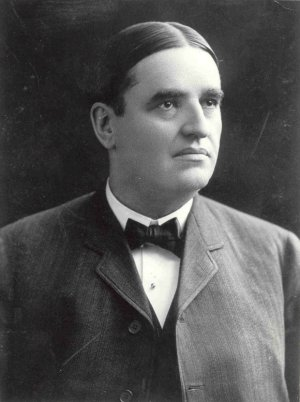

8th Superintendent of Chicago Public Schools
- In office 1900 – February 12, 1909
- Preceded by: Elisha Andrews
- Succeeded by: Ella Flagg Young

Personal details
- Born: March 12, 1857 Strawberry Point, Iowa
- Died: September 28, 1923 (aged 66) Winnetka, Illinois
- Spouse: Lydia K. Stanley (m. 1878)
- Children: 6

Edwin Gilbert Cooley (March 12, 1857 – September 28, 1923) was an American schoolteacher who later served as superintendent of the Chicago Public Schools district from 1900 until February 1909.

== Early life and education ==
Cooley was born in Strawberry Point, Iowa. He started college at Iowa State University in 1872, but had to leave to work as a wagon maker's apprentice. In 1895 he graduated from the University of Chicago with a Ph.B.

== Career ==
Cooley became principal of a school in Strawberry Point in 1882, then in 1885 superintendent of schools in Cresco, Iowa. After moving to Illinois, he became principal of East Side High School in Aurora in 1891 and then of Lyons Township High School in La Grange in 1893, while serving on the Iowa State Normal Board from 1890 to 1896. In 1894 he also served as head of the Illinois State Teachers Association.

=== Superintendent of Chicago Public Schools ===
In 1900, Cooley turned down the position of head at Chicago Normal School, the precursor of Chicago State University, to accept the position of superintendent of Chicago Public Schools. During his tenure, he served as head of the department of superintendence of the National Educational Association in 1904, and as its president in 1907. As superintendent, Cooley sought to combat graft and political patronage in the Chicago schools through more centralized control and promotion of efficiency. One of his actions was to reduce the number of school board committees from seventeen to four. In 1901 he backed a reform bill proposed by a commission headed by William Rainey Harper that would have required a college degree to teach in the school system. This would have greatly disadvantaged women teachers, most of whom in Chicago at the time were Irish Catholics. There was regular hostility between his office and the Chicago Teachers Federation. He resigned on February 12, 1909. Cooley made several attempts to require members of high school football teams to maintain passing grades in order to participate in their sport. In late 1902, he managed to pressure the Board of Control overseeing high school football competition in Chicago to instate such a requirement.

== Later career ==
Cooley was subsequently president of the publisher D. C. Heath and Company, then from 1910 to 1915, educational commissioner of the Commercial Club of Chicago. In this position he traveled widely studying industrial schools in the US, Europe, and Japan. He particularly endorsed the approach to vocational schools in Munich, persuading the Commercial Club to commission an English translation of Staatsbürgerliche Erziehung ("Civic Education") by Georg Kerschensteiner and publish Kerschensteiner's lectures given on a 1910 tour of the US. A bill named for him was unsuccessfully proposed in the Illinois state legislature that would have created a separate system of vocational schools modeled on the German system. From 1918 until his death, he was head of the Chicago continuation schools.

== Personal life and death ==
He married Lydia K. Stanley on January 1, 1878; they had six children and lived in La Grange, Illinois. After suffering a nervous breakdown in 1922, he died at a sanitarium in Winnetka on September 28, 1923, aged 67.

== Publications ==
- Some Continuation Schools in Europe (1912)
- The Need of Vocational Schools in the United States (1912)
- Vocational Education in Europe, 2 vols. (1912, 1915)

== Honors ==
- Honorary degree, University of Illinois
- Austrian Order of Franz Joseph
- Edwin G. Cooley Vocational High School and Upper Grade Center, Chicago
