= Dontrell =

Dontrell is a masculine given name of African American origin, which emerged in the late 20th century in the United States. It is considered a creative combination of the names Don and Trell, and is primarily used within the African American community.

Notable people with the given name include:

- Dontrell "Cockroach" Hamilton, a Marvel Comics supervillain
- Dontrell Hilliard (b. 1995), an American football player
- DonTrell Moore (b. 1982), an American football player

== See also ==
- Dantrell
- Dontrelle
