= List of colleges and universities in Chicago =

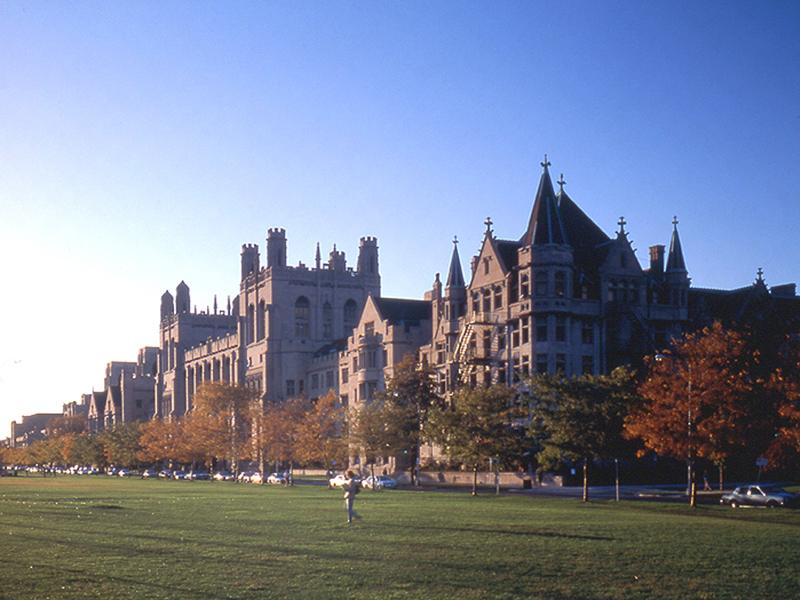
A view of the campus of the University of Chicago, looking northwest, from the Midway Plaisance

The following is a list of colleges and universities in the Chicago metropolitan area.

== Community and junior colleges ==
=== Public institutions ===
- City Colleges of Chicago
  - Harold Washington College
  - Kennedy–King College
  - Malcolm X College
  - Olive–Harvey College
  - Richard J. Daley College
  - Truman College
  - Wilbur Wright College
- College of DuPage (Glen Ellyn, Illinois)
- College of Lake County (Grayslake, Illinois)
- Elgin Community College (Elgin, Illinois)
- Harper College (Palatine, Illinois)
- Joliet Junior College (Joliet, Illinois)
- McHenry County College (Crystal Lake, Illinois)
- Moraine Valley Community College (Palos Hills, Illinois)
- Morton College (Cicero, Illinois)
- Oakton College (Des Plaines and Skokie, Illinois)
- Prairie State College (Chicago Heights, Illinois)
- South Suburban College (South Holland, Illinois)
- Triton College (River Grove, Illinois)
- Waubonsee Community College (Sugar Grove, Illinois)

=== Private institutions ===
- Generations College (Chicago, Illinois)

== Colleges granting bachelor's degrees and above ==
- Columbia College Chicago (Chicago)
- Hebrew Theological College (Skokie, Illinois)
- Lake Forest College (Lake Forest, Illinois)
- Moody Bible Institute (Chicago)
- North Central College (Naperville, Illinois)
- St. Augustine College (Chicago)
- School of the Art Institute of Chicago (Chicago)
- Telshe Yeshiva (Chicago)
- Trinity Christian College (Palos Heights, Illinois)
- VanderCook College of Music (Chicago)
- Wheaton College (Wheaton, Illinois)

== Universities and graduate schools ==
=== Public institutions ===
- Chicago State University (Chicago)
- Governors State University (University Park, Illinois)
- Northeastern Illinois University (Chicago)
- Northern Illinois University (DeKalb, Illinois)
- University of Illinois Chicago (Chicago)

=== Private institutions ===
- Aurora University (Aurora, Illinois)
- Benedictine University (Lisle, Illinois)
- Concordia University Chicago (River Forest, Illinois)
- DePaul University (Chicago)
- Dominican University (River Forest, Illinois)
- East–West University (Chicago)
- Elmhurst University (Elmhurst, Illinois)
- Illinois Institute of Technology (Chicago and Wheaton, Illinois)
- Judson University (Elgin, Illinois)
- Kendall College (Chicago)
- Lewis University (Romeoville, Illinois)
- Loyola University Chicago (Chicago)
- Midwestern University (Downers Grove, Illinois)
- National Louis University (Chicago)
- National University of Health Sciences (Lombard, Illinois)
- North Park University (Chicago)
- Northwestern University (Evanston, Illinois and Chicago)
- Roosevelt University (Chicago)
- Saint Xavier University (Chicago)
- Trinity International University (Deerfield, Illinois)
- University of Chicago (Chicago)
- University of St. Francis (Joliet, Illinois)
- University of Saint Mary of the Lake (Mundelein, Illinois)

=== Programs, graduate- and professional-only ===
==== Business ====
- Booth School of Business (Chicago)
- Kellogg School of Management (Chicago, Evanston, Miami)
- Kellstadt Graduate School of Business (Chicago)
- Lake Forest Graduate School of Management (Lake Forest, Illinois)
- Liautaud Graduate School of Business (Chicago, public)
- Quinlan School of Business (Chicago)
- Stuart School of Business (Chicago)

==== Law ====
- Chicago-Kent College of Law (Chicago)
- DePaul University College of Law (Chicago)
- Loyola University Chicago School of Law (Chicago)
- Northern Illinois University College of Law (DeKalb, public)
- Northwestern Pritzker School of Law (Chicago)
- University of Illinois Chicago School of Law (Chicago, public)
- University of Chicago Law School (Chicago)

==== Medical, dental and healthcare ====
- Chicago College of Osteopathic Medicine (Chicago)
- Feinberg School of Medicine (Chicago)
- Illinois College of Optometry (Chicago)
- Midwestern University (Downers Grove)
- Pritzker School of Medicine (Chicago)
- Rosalind Franklin University of Medicine and Science (North Chicago, Illinois)
- Rush University (Chicago)
- Stritch School of Medicine (Maywood)
- UIC College of Pharmacy (Chicago, public)
- University of Illinois at Chicago College of Dentistry (Chicago, public)
- University of Illinois College of Medicine (Chicago, public)

==== Religious and theological ====
- Bexley Seabury (Chicago)
- Catholic Theological Union (Chicago)
- Chicago Theological Seminary (Chicago)
- Christian Life College (Mount Prospect, IL)
- Garrett–Evangelical Theological Seminary (Evanston, Illinois)
- Lutheran School of Theology at Chicago (Chicago)
- McCormick Theological Seminary (Chicago)
- Meadville Lombard Theological School (Chicago)
- Moody Bible Institute (Chicago)
- North Park Theological Seminary (Chicago)
- Northern Seminary (Lisle, Illinois)
- Spertus Institute for Jewish Learning and Leadership (Chicago)
- University of Chicago Divinity School (Chicago)

==== Social science ====
- Adler University (Chicago)
- The Chicago School of Professional Psychology (Chicago)
- Erikson Institute (Chicago)
- Institute for Clinical Social Work (Chicago)

==== Technology and other areas ====
- Toyota Technological Institute at Chicago (Chicago)

== For-profit ==
- American InterContinental University (Schaumburg)
- Chamberlain University (Addison)
- DeVry University (Chicago)
- Fox College (Bedford Park and Tinley Park)
- Midwest College of Oriental Medicine (Skokie)
- Pacific College of Health and Science (Chicago)
- Rasmussen University (Aurora, Mokena, Romeoville)
- SAE Institute Chicago (Chicago)
- Taylor Business Institute (Chicago)
- University of Phoenix (Schaumburg)

=== Non-degree-granting career colleges ===
- Illinois Media School (Chicago; Downtown and O'Hare area)
- Universal Technical Institute (Lisle)

== Defunct ==
- American Conservatory of Music (1886–1991, Chicago)
- Argosy University (2001–2019, Chicago, Schaumburg)
- Barat College (1858–2005, Lake Forest, Illinois), merged with DePaul University
- Bush Conservatory of Music (1901–1932, Chicago)
- Central YMCA College (1922–1945, Chicago)
- The Chicago Conservatory College (1857–1981, Chicago)
- Chicago Technical College (1904–1977, Chicago)
- Coyne College (Chicago)
- Evanston College for Ladies (1871–1873, Evanston, Illinois), merged with Northwestern University in 1873
- Everest College (Bedford Park, Burr Ridge, Melrose Park, Merrionette Park, North Aurora, Skokie)
- Flashpoint Chicago (2007–2022, Chicago)
- George Williams College (1890–2000), merged its Wisconsin campus into Aurora University
- Harrington College of Design (1931–2015, Chicago)
- Illinois Institute of Art – Chicago (1916–2018, Chicago)
- Illinois Institute of Art – Schaumburg (1983–2018, Schaumburg)
- Illinois Technical College (1950–1992, Chicago)
- International Academy of Design & Technology – Schaumburg (1977–2015)
- ITT Technical Institute (1969–2016, Arlington Heights, Oak Brook, Orland Park)
- Knowledge Systems Institute (Skokie)
- La Salle Extension University (1908–1982, Chicago)
- Le Cordon Bleu College of Culinary Arts in Chicago (1983–2017, Chicago)
- Lexington College (1977–2014, Chicago)
- Mallinckrodt College (1916–1991, Wilmette), merged with Loyola University Chicago
- Mundelein College (1930–1991, Chicago) merged with Loyola University of Chicago
- Northwestern College (Chicago, Bridgeview)
- Old University of Chicago (1856–1886, Chicago)
- Robert Morris University Illinois (1913–2020, Chicago), merged into Roosevelt University in 2020
- Sanford–Brown (1920–2017, Chicago)
- Shimer College (1853–2017, Mount Carroll, Waukegan, Chicago), merged with North Central College in Naperville in 2017
- Solex College (1995–2018, Chicago, Wheeling)
- Westwood College (1953–2016, Calumet City, Chicago, Woodridge)

== See also ==
- List of colleges and universities in Illinois
- History of education in Chicago
