= Dontrelle =

Dontrelle is a given name. Notable people with the name include:

- Dontrelle Inman (born 1989), American football player
- Dontrelle Willis (born 1982), American baseball player

== See also ==
- Dantrell
- Dontrell
