= Jones College Prep High School =

Location
- 700 S. State Street; Chicago, Illinois 60605; United States; 41°52′25″N 87°37′41″W

Information
- School type: Public; Secondary; Magnet
- Established: 1938
- School district: Chicago Public Schools
- CEEB code: 140905
- Principal: Kerry Dolan
- Teaching staff: 112
- Grades: 9–12
- Gender: Coed
- Enrollment: 1,957 (2020–2021)
- Campus type: Metropolitan
- Colors: Navy Blue; White
- Athletics conference: Chicago Public League
- Mascot: Eagles
- Accreditation: North Central Association of Colleges and Schools
- Website: jonescollegeprep.org

William Jones College Preparatory High School (commonly known as Jones College Prep) is a public four-year selective-enrollment high school located in the Printers Row neighborhood in downtown Chicago, Illinois, United States. Jones is operated by the Chicago Public Schools district. Jones was named one of “America’s Best High Schools” for 2010 by Newsweek magazine. Jones ranks fourth in Illinois high schools according to U.S. News and World Report.

== Name ==
Named for Chicago's first school superintendent, William Jones, the school has undergone several name changes related to its focus, from Jones Commercial High School to Jones Metropolitan High School of Business and Commerce to Jones Academic Magnet High School. Its current name and focus on college preparatory education were adopted in August 1998.

== Academics ==
The Advanced Placement participation rate is 96%.

== History ==
Jones was established in 1938 as Jones Commercial High School when the Chicago Board of Education decided a school was needed to serve the downtown area of the city. The site chosen, at South State Street and West Harrison Street, housed a former elementary school. The old building was later demolished and replaced by a modern six-story structure in 1966. In addition to being a high school, Jones had a two-year program that offered a wide range of training for skilled office work.

During the 1981–1982 school year, the school was renamed Jones Metropolitan High School of Business and Commerce after becoming a part of the Chicago Public Schools "Options for Knowledge" program. By the 1997–1998 academic year, Jones' business and commerce program was phased out and it became a college preparatory school.

The school is one of 11 selective-enrollment schools offered by the Chicago Public Schools. These schools are generally for academically high-achieving students and require a test and high grades and test scores in order for applicants to be accepted. Other selective-enrollment schools in Chicago include Whitney M. Young Magnet High School, Walter Payton College Preparatory High School, and Hancock High School. The current principal of the school as of 2025 is Ms. Kerry Dolan.

== Demographics ==
As of December 2021, the racial makeup of Jones is 36.9% White, 29% Hispanic, 11.6% Black, 15.2% Asian, and 7.3% other. 35.5% of Jones students are categorized as "Low Income" and 1.1% as having limited English.

== Campus ==
The original six-floor campus was designed by Perkins&Will in 1967 and served as a compact downtown school.

For the 2001–2002 school year, Jones was temporarily located at Near North Career Metropolitan High School building while the site on State Street underwent renovation. In the early 2000s, the City of Chicago filed suit against Pacific Garden Mission, a Christian-based homeless shelter then located next door to Jones, in order to expand the school. Work began in 2011 on a new south building, designed by Chicago-based architecture firm Perkins+Will. Jones' new building opened for the 2013–2014 school year. The existing six-floor building was set for demolition until it was merged with the new building to increase capacity to 1800 students. The Chicago Sun-Times called the building, with its price tag of over 100 million dollars, the most expensive school that the city has ever built.

The seven-story building completed in 2013 features a pool and gymnasium on the seventh floor as well as a library and terraces. The building also has a theater for performing arts and school assemblies. The original building is six stories tall and features weight rooms, a theater, and additional classrooms.

== Awards and recognition ==
In 2007, Jones College Prep was awarded a Gold Medal from U.S. News & World Report in their issue featuring the top 100 high schools in the nation based on college readiness, and in 2006 the school received the Blue Ribbon award from the Department of Education. Jones was recognized as one of “America’s Best High Schools” by U.S. News & World Report and was ranked in the top 100 high schools in 2010. Jones ranked in the Top 10 among Illinois public high schools on the PSAE state assessment (2008 and 2009). In 2019, Jones College Prep was ranked 91st among Best High Schools by U.S. News & World Report.

== Athletics ==
Jones competes in the Chicago Public League (CPL) and is a member of the Illinois High School Association (IHSA). In 2012, Jones' boys cross-country team won the IHSA 2A state title. From 2001 until 2014, the athletic program utilized the former Near North High School building at 1450 N. Larrabee Avenue.

== Notable alumni ==
=== Jones Elementary School (1846–1913) ===
- "Hinky Dink" Michael Kenna, Chicago alderman
- "Bathhouse John" Coughlin, Chicago alderman

=== Jones College Prep (1998–present) ===
- Chance the Rapper (2011), hip-hop artist, Grammy winner
- Andre Reynolds II (2019), soccer player
- Victor Bezerra (2018), soccer player

== See also ==
- Chicago Police Dept. v. Mosley
