= Marion Stamps =

Chicago activist

- 1982 photograph of Stamps speaking at a Chicago city forum
- Born: M. Marion Adams; May 28, 1945; Jackson, Mississippi, U.S.
- Died: August 28, 1996 (aged 51); Chicago, Illinois, U.S.
- Other names: Queen Nzinga; Sister Marion; Mother Marion; Queen of Cabrini; Mother of Cabrini
- Citizenship: United States
- Occupations: Activist; Member of Illinois chapter Black Panther Party
- Organization: Chicago Housing Tenants Organization
- Known for: Activism against the displacement and treatment of Cabrini-Green housing project residents in Chicago.

Marion Nzinga Stamps (born M. Marion Adams; May 28, 1945 – August 28, 1996) was an American community activist who fought for equal rights of public housing residents in the Cabrini-Green housing project on the Near-North Side of Chicago, Illinois. She helped to elect Chicago's first African-American mayor, Harold Washington, by organizing a massive voter registration drive in 1983. She was aggressive in her fights to make sure that residents of housing developments had voices regarding their violent and harsh living conditions in public housing. In 1993, Stamps began working with many gang leaders throughout Chicago to help end growing violence. In 1994 she and others successfully navigated what remains the only citywide gang truce in Chicago's history.

== Early life ==
Born in Jackson, Mississippi, Stamps became involved with the civil rights movement at age 13 under the guidance and direction of her former neighbor, famed civil rights activist Medgar Evers. Their goal was to help integrate the Jackson Public Library. Through this fight, she was able to gain insight and mentoring from civil rights activist and gospel singer Mahalia Jackson.

== Activism ==
Stamps moved to Chicago in 1963 and quickly became involved in the local civil rights movement. She moved to the Cabrini-Green housing project at 1230 North Burling Avenue where she began fighting for better living conditions and many other issues faced by Cabrini residents.

=== Chicago Housing Tenants Organization (CHTO) ===
As there were considerably subpar living conditions, a group of tenants, including Stamps, founded the Chicago Housing Tenants Organization (CHTO). The CHTO fought the housing department, addressing major issues with the building. Stamps's work extended to housing issues throughout the city. In the 1980s, Stamps's work and collaboration with other housing rights organizations became nationwide, and eventually she played a significant role in the first and only successful nationwide rent strike against HUD.

=== Black Panther Party and volunteer work ===
Her work caught the eye of many powerful civil rights activists. She teamed up with William Darden and his west side organization, helping to organize and galvanize many during Rev. Dr. Martin Luther King Jr.'s stay in Chicago. More radical than most, Stamps became a member of the Black Panther Party, working alongside Fred Hampton and Mark Clark. On the north side of Chicago, Stamps became associated with the Party's work with the Rainbow Coalition, a group that included the Young Patriots and Young Lords. She temporarily served as a volunteer worker for Illinois U.S. representative Cardiss Collins during her campaign in 1978.

=== Tranquility Marksman Memorial Organization ===
Along with several other women, Stamps helped establish and organize the Tranquility Marksman Memorial Organization (TMMO), which had evolved from CHTO and was named in honor of late activists Tranquility Phillips and Professor Edwin Marksman. Marksman, a professor at the University of Illinois at Chicago Jane Addams School of Social Work, was murdered in 1981. Although some claim that Stamps believed that Marksman was murdered by Chicago Police officers for the work that he and his students were doing on police brutality in Chicago involving former Chicago police commander Jon Burge, Marksman's death announcement in Jet Magazine stated that he was stabbed during a mugging.

=== Disputes with Chicago mayors ===
Stamps' confrontational actions often angered Chicago mayors. Stamps helped organize a boycott of the 1982 and 1983 ChicagoFests, events which were created by Chicago mayor Michael Bilandic in 1978. When Chicago mayor Jane Byrne moved into the Cabrini-Green project for 30 days in March 1981 with the stated intention of improving conditions, Stamps and a group of residents caught the mayor leaving the development each evening, revealing that she had never stayed overnight. Byrne ended the stay at Cabrini after an Easter celebration on April 18, 1981. In 1983, Stamps angered newly elected Mayor Harold Washington when she attempted to organize a rent strike with other Chicago Housing Authority residents over complaints of poor maintenance. Stamps and Washington resolved the matter and had a strong relationship until Washington died in 1987.

=== Collaboration on redevelopment of Cabrini ===
In the months before her death, Stamps changed her opposition of redevelopment efforts at Cabrini. She worked with tenants during the process and began a successful collaboration with tenants from the Cabrini buildings located at 1150 North Sedgwick Avenue, 1160 North Sedgwick Avenue, 500 West Oak Street, 502 West Oak Street, 1157 North Cleveland Avenue, and 1159 North Cleveland Avenue. During the process, Stamps worked to secure HOPE VI funding for residents who were transitioning from public housing.

== Aldermanic election ==
In 1995, she ran for alderman of Chicago's 27th Ward but lost to Walter Burnett, Jr. It was one of the most expensive aldermanic elections in Chicago. After the election, Stamps planned to move back to Jackson, Mississippi to assist with the care of her ailing father.

== Death, family, and legacy ==
Stamps was born with a heart condition that worsened until she died in her sleep on August 28, 1996. She was the mother of five daughters, all of whom became active as teachers, youth program directors, youth programming, and in juvenile justice in impoverished neighborhoods. Her youngest daughter became director of the Marion Nzinga Stamps Youth Center in the Near-North neighborhood.
