= Murder of Stephanie Kuhen =

1995 child murder in Los Angeles, California

- Born: October 4, 1991
- Died: September 17, 1995 (aged 3)

The murder of Stephanie Kuhen (October 4, 1991 – September 17, 1995) in Los Angeles, California created significant media attention in the United States and led to crackdowns on Los Angeles street gangs.

== Incident ==
Around 1:45 a.m. on September 17, 1995, along Isabel Street in the Cypress Park neighborhood, a street nicknamed "Avenida . . . assecinos," an incorrectly spelled Spanish phrase (Note: Corrected spelling: "Avenida de los Asesinos".) meaning "Street of Killers" or "Avenue of the Assassins," members of The Avenues gang shot at a vehicle containing a family returning from a cookout; according to the prosecution the vehicle made a wrong turn into an alley. A 3-year-old girl named Stephanie Kuhen died, and Kuhen's stepfather and younger brother sustained injuries. The perpetrators were arrested and convicted.

== Legal action ==
On August 1, 1997, Los Angeles Superior Court Judge Edward Ferns sentenced 28-year-old Anthony Gabriel Rodriguez, 22-year-old Manuel Rosales Jr., and 16-year-old Hugo David Gomez to 54 years and eight months to life in state prison. At that point, 17-year-old Augustin Lizama was to be retried. During the sentencing of the three convicted murderers, Margaret Fregoso, Rodriguez's grandmother, defended him and said that people outside of the court speculated that the Kuhen automobile traveled through the neighborhood so one or more occupants could purchase recreational drugs. Robynn Kuhen, the mother of Stephanie Kuhen, said that her family was trying to find a shortcut home and said that Fregoso's statements were not true. The defense in the trial suggested that the Kuhen family knew the layout of the area and would not have found themselves lost in their car. On Friday, August 29, 1997, Lizama agreed to a plea bargain in which he received a conviction for assault.

Rodriguez, California Department of Corrections and Rehabilitation (CDCR) #K65397, was booked into the CDCR system on September 2, 1997. As of 2023, he is incarcerated at Correctional Training Facility.

Rosales, CDCR#K65037, was booked on August 29, 1997. As of 2023, he was incarcerated at Ironwood State Prison. He was granted parole in August 2023.

Gomez, CDCR#K65384, was booked on September 2, 1997. As of 2023, he is incarcerated at California Health Care Facility.

== Aftermath ==
Several days after the incident, President of the United States Bill Clinton condemned the killing and said that the United States Federal Government would give money to anti-gang efforts. After the Kuhen incident, Mayor of Los Angeles Richard Riordan asked the Criminal Justice Planning Office (CJPO) to create recommendations regarding gang crime. Several months after the Kuhen incident, the task force's suggestions lead to the creation of the Los Angeles City/County Community Law Enforcement and Recovery (CLEAR) program.

Kuhen was buried in a private ceremony on Monday September 25, 1995. About 100 people attended the ceremony.

== Analysis ==
Sociologist Wayne Mellinger used critical discourse analysis to examine the news report in the Los Angeles Times, writing that "pre-existing narratives and maps of meaning are taken from our cultural myths and assigned to a new reality so that the new reality conforms to that cultural myth....This is how ideologies work." He asserts that the Los Angeles Times story employed many features of innocent victim narratives, including unexpected circumstances with no way out, emotion-arousing words and phrases. Mellinger also claimed that an informant in the LAPD told him that the event, as reported in the Times, may not have occurred at all; his informant alleged that what actually occurred was a drug deal gone bad.

George Ramos of the Los Angeles Times reported that many Cypress Park residents were angered by the negative portrayal of their community in the media. Specifically mentioned were concerns that there was a perceived lack of attention to gang issues from the municipal government and their council member, Mike Hernandez. There was also anger about the Los Angeles Times posting large images of Stephanie Kuhen and her brother on the front page of the newspaper, stating that the media does not do this with ethnic minority children. Ramos said that the editor of the newspaper had asked for the images of the children to be posted before learning that they were white. Ramos also stated that many Cypress Park residents believed that if one is not from Cypress Park, one should be concerned with crime in his or her own neighborhood rather than in Cypress Park.

Allan Parachini of the American Civil Liberties Union said that the media focused attention on the Kuhen case because the victim was white. George Cotliar, a Los Angeles Times managing editor, said that race was not the reason why the media focused attention on the case. Bill Lord, a director at NBC affiliate KNBC, also stated that race was not a factor in why the media covered the Kuhen case. Larry Elder, a politically conservative African-American talk show host, stated that law enforcement ignored the gangs in Cypress Park since most of the residents were Hispanic and Black.

== See also ==
- Dantrell Davis
