= Near North Career Metropolitan High School =

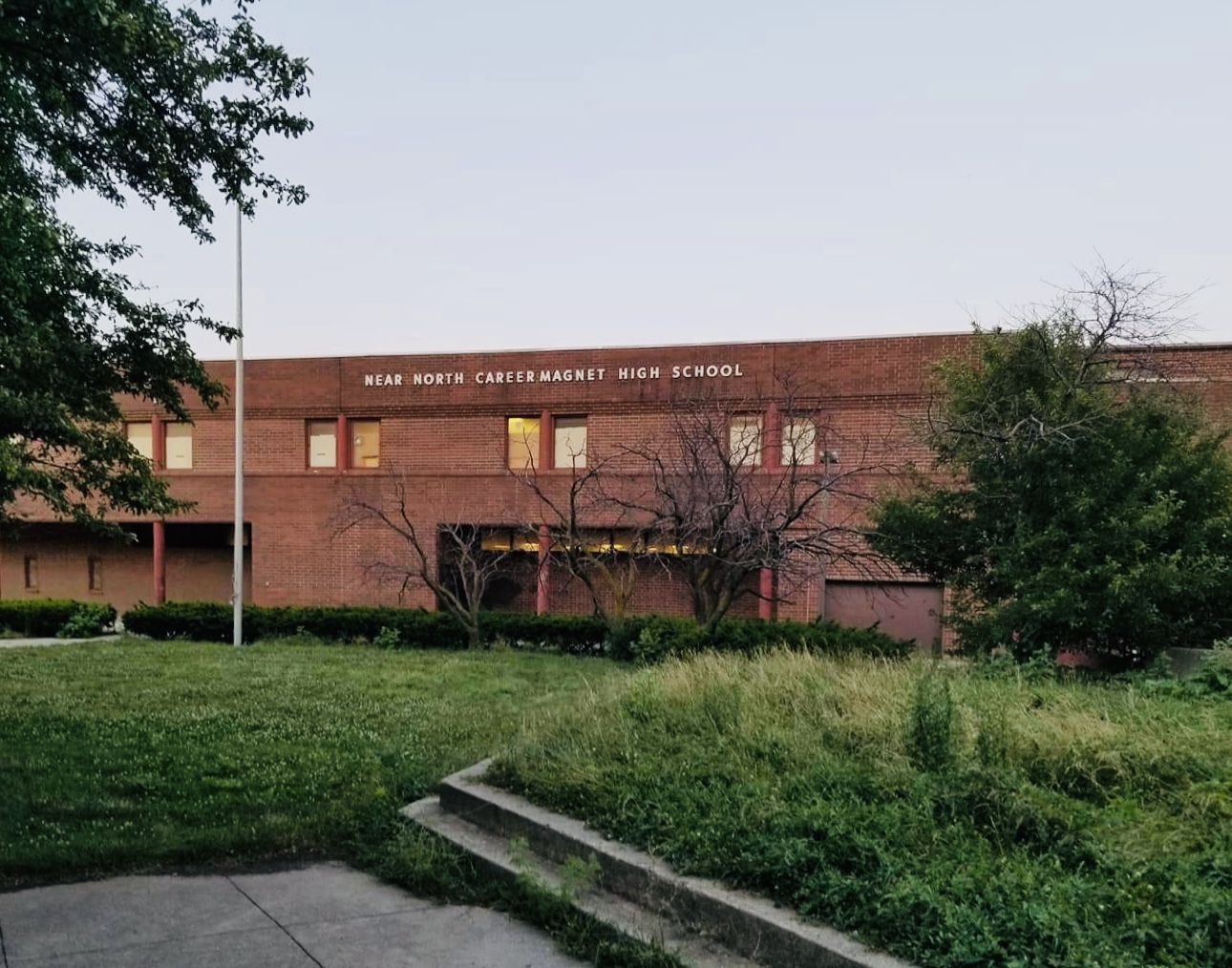

Location
- 1450 N. Larrabee Street; Chicago, Illinois 60610; United States; 41.9085°N 87.6439°W

Information
- School type: Public; Secondary; Magnet
- Motto: "Education is a Treasure"
- Opened: September 5, 1979
- Status: Demolished; 2020
- Closed: June 2001
- School district: Chicago Public Schools
- CEEB code: 141053
- Grades: 9–12
- Gender: Coed
- Enrollment: 132 (2000–2001)
- Campus size: 11 acres (4.5 ha)
- Campus type: Urban
- Colors: Maroon; Gold
- Slogan: "Huskies have pride, Pass it on!"
- Athletics conference: Chicago Public League
- Mascot: Huskies
- Accreditation: North Central Association of Colleges and Schools
- Newspaper: Metro-Lites
- Yearbook: Maroon & Gold

Near North Career Metropolitan High School (formerly known as Near North Career Magnet High School and Near North Career Academy High School) was a public 4–year magnet high school located in the Old Town neighborhood on the Near North Side of Chicago, Illinois, United States. Operated by the Chicago Public Schools district, Near North opened in September 1979.

Near North served as a new and replacement school for the area when Cooley Vocational High School was closed at the end of the 1978–1979 school year due to inadequate conditions within the building. In addition to being a magnet school, Near North offered vocational courses through the Education To Careers (ETC) program. Near North closed in June 2001 due to the decline in its enrollment and the city's plans for the surrounding neighborhood.

== History ==
In November 1974, The Chicago Board of Education decided to phase out Cooley High due to its poor academic performance and the aged building. In March of the following year, The Chicago Public Schools (CPS) and the board decided a newer and modern school needed to be constructed on the near–north side to replace Cooley. When it became time to decide a location for the school, CPS decided to build the new school on the land where Cooley stood. City council and white community members argued that Cooley's location would only serve the residents of Cabrini–Green, a predominately African–American housing project located within walking distance (as Cooley did over time) and that students from other neighborhoods would be afraid to travel through the housing project.

After years of debating about the location of the new school, The board voted on what they considered a neutral location for the school in August 1977. The location was a vacant landfill north-west of Cooley, bordered by North Avenue to the north, Clybourn Avenue to the south, Larrabee Street to the east. The chosen site, named the Larrabee-Ogden-Clybourn triangle was the location of the former Sieben Brewery which was demolished by the 1950s and the Isham YMCA. Chicago Mayor Michael Bilandic and schools superintendent Joseph P. Hannon led the groundbreaking ceremony for the new $8–million school building on November 23, 1977.

In April 1978, construction began on the school and was completed in three phases. On September 5, 1979, the school opened as Near North Career Magnet High School with a student body enrollment of 600; with the student demographic being 47% African-American, 32% White, 18% Hispanic and 3% Other. The school had a magnet program and offered IB courses in addition to classes in vocational courses such as: horticulture, hotel-restaurant management, ophthalmic assistant training, graphic arts and auto mechanics through the Education To Careers (ETC) program. At the time of its opening, the school was still under construction with only 19 classrooms and laboratories completed. Due to this, Vocational classes began in March of the following year. The late start led to a large percentage of white Near North students from areas outside of the school boundaries becoming disgusted and transferring out by mid-school year.

By the middle of the 1979–1980 school year, Near North's student demographic was 70% African-American, 15% White, 10% Hispanic and 5% Other. Near North's 4–year drop-out rate for the class of 1982, Students who began their freshmen year at Cooley was 59.6%. The drop-out rate was 8.5% after the 1983–1984 school year. By April 1985, Near North had an enrollment of 1,073 students, 899 African-Americans, 78 Whites and 65 Hispanics. The school was renamed to Near North Career Metropolitan High School during the 1986–1987 school year.

=== Athletics ===
Near North competed in the Chicago Public League (CPL) and was a member of the Illinois High School Association (IHSA). The schools' sports teams were named Huskies. Near North boys' football team were Class 4A one time during the 1988–1989 season under the leadership of coach Lowell Bouck.

=== Other information ===
American politician, then-Colorado state senate Gary Hart spoke at the school during his presidential campaign in March 1984. In June 1998, an 18-year-old student was arrested and charged with setting off a half-stick of dynamite in one of the school bathrooms.

== Closure ==
By the 1995–1996 school year, 89% of the student body at the Near North were residents of the Cabrini-Green. When Housing and Urban Development (HUD) took control of Chicago public housing complexes and began to demolish the high-rises within Cabrini-Green, leading to a decline in the school's population. In October 1997, The Board of Education decided that Near North needed to be demolished due to parts of the building's foundation sinking; believing to have been constructed on an old landfill from The Great Chicago Fire of 1871.

After further evaluation of the school, It was later decided in January 1998 that Near North would begin phasing out during the 1998–1999 school year. At the time, School officials initial plan was to replace Near North with a new magnet school, Near North Math and Science Academy High School with the location being near South Halsted and West Goethe Streets. The final reasons for closure was due to the school's low academic performance, the decline in population (enrollment was 526 at the time) and lack of declining appeal to attract students from outside of the area (97% of students lived in Cabrini at the time). The school closed at the end of the 2000–2001 school year; graduating its final senior class of 132.

=== Building uses ===
For the 2001–2002 school year, Jones College Prep temporarily relocated in the school due to renovations of its downtown–area campus. After the temporary relocation at the school, Jones continued to use the school's gymnasium and soccer field for their athletic teams until 2015. From 2006 to 2019, The Chicago Police Department (CPD) and Chicago Fire Department (CFD) used the building as a training site. In January 2016, the school's soccer field became nearby Lincoln Park High School's home field.

== Proposed plans/Demolition ==
In February 2009, The Chicago Board of Education president Michael Scott and community members suggested that the school be re-opened as a high school to avoid closing a nearby elementary school to house the then-new Ogden International High School for the 2009–2010 school year. In July 2010, community activists and Chicago Teachers Union members protested that more school buildings were needed and the building be reopened for public school purpose.

In May 2012, Chicago Public Schools transferred ownership of the building to the Chicago Housing Authority. Housing authority officials stated that the site would be used for mixed-income residential and open space uses. A group of Old Town and Near North Side residents started a petition for the city of Chicago to demolish the building and build a city park on the site in September 2013. In April 2019, The city issued a development plan in which the school's adjacent field would be transferred from the Chicago Housing Authority to the Chicago Park District; with plans for a park on the site funded through Tax Increment Financing (TIF). The building was vacated in 2019, demolition began on August 14, 2020, and completed in November 2020.
