= Cabrini–Green Homes =

Public housing development in Chicago, Illinois, United States

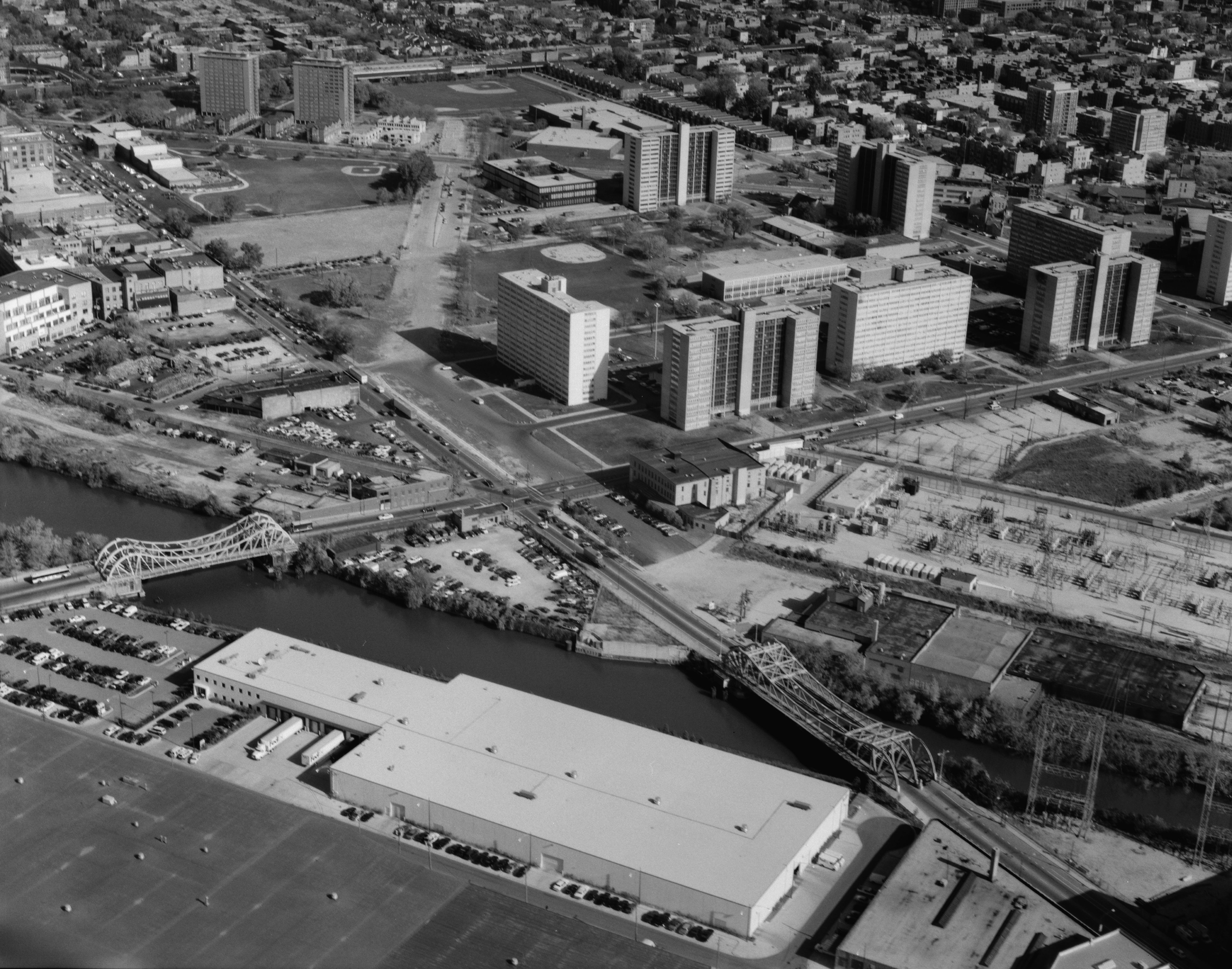
- A 1999 photograph looking northeast at the William Green Homes of the Cabrini–Green housing project, with visible former right-of-way of Ogden Avenue
- Interactive map of Cabrini–Green Homes

General information
- Location: Bordered by Halsted and Larrabee Streets, Clybourn Avenue, Chicago Avenue, and Orleans Street, Near North Side, Chicago, Illinois, U.S.
- Coordinates: 41°54′1.5″N 87°38′24.5″W
- Status: 140 of 584 Units (Rowhouses; Renovated)

Construction
- Constructed: 1942; Cabrini Rowhouses; 1957; Cabrini Extensions; 1962; William Green Homes

Listing
- Demolished: 1995–2011; most of the Cabrini Extensions; March 30, 2011; William Green Homes

Other information
- Governing body: Chicago Housing Authority (CHA)

Cabrini–Green Homes are a Chicago Housing Authority (CHA) public housing project on the Near North Side of Chicago, Illinois, United States. The Frances Cabrini Rowhouses and Extensions were south of Division Street, bordered by Larrabee Street to the west, Orleans Street to the east and Chicago Avenue to the south, with the William Green Homes to the northwest.

At its peak, Cabrini–Green was home to 15,000 people, mostly living in mid- and high-rise apartment buildings. The development experienced significant challenges, including high crime rates and building deterioration. "Cabrini–Green" became a metonym for problems associated with public housing in the United States.

Beginning in 1995, the CHA initiated the demolition of the mid- and high-rise buildings, with the final structure removed in 2011. Today, only the original two-story rowhouses remain.

The neighborhood has undergone extensive redevelopment and gentrification, influenced by its proximity to downtown Chicago. The area now includes a mix of market-rate and CHA-owned housing, forming a mixed-income community consisting of high-rise buildings and townhouses.

== Layout and demographics ==
The construction of Cabrini–Green reflected the mid-20th-century urban renewal strategies used in United States urban planning. The extension buildings were referred to as the "Reds" due to their red brick exteriors, while the William Green Homes were called the "Whites" because of their reinforced concrete construction. Many of the high-rise buildings featured exterior porches called open galleries. According to the Chicago Housing Authority, the initial residents of the Cabrini rowhouses were primarily of Italian descent. By 1962, the majority of residents in the full complex were African American.

== History ==
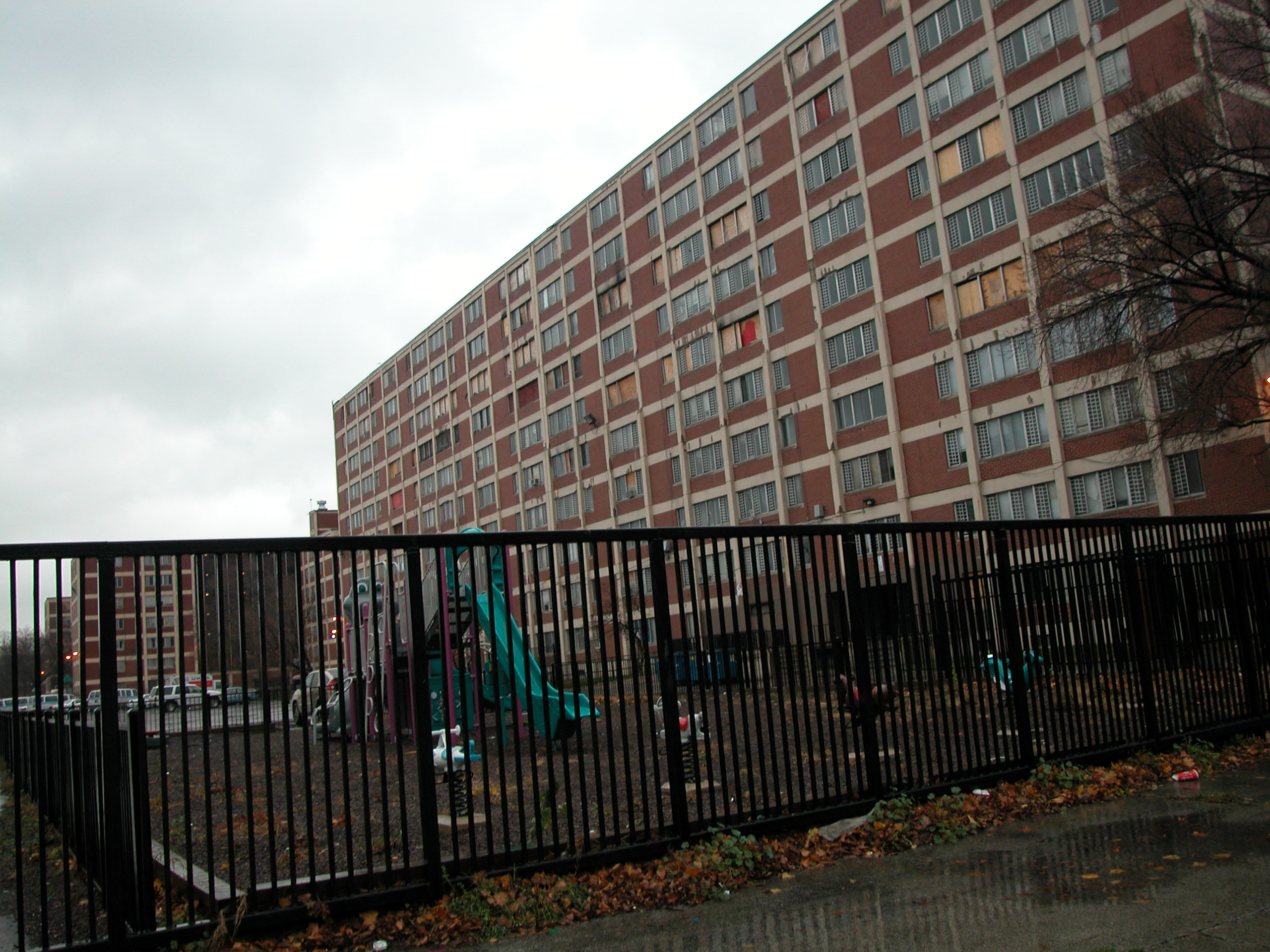
A Cabrini–Green mid-rise building, November 2004

In the 1850s, shanties were built on low-lying land along the Chicago River, initially inhabited by Swedish and later Irish populations. The area became known as "Little Hell" due to the presence of a nearby gas refinery that emitted visible flames and fumes.

By the early 20th century, it was referred to as "Little Sicily" due to a large Sicilian immigrant population. In 1929 Harvey Warren Zorbaugh wrote "The Gold Coast and the Slum: A Sociological Study of Chicago's Near North Side", examining the contrasting social conditions of the affluent Gold Coast, the impoverished Little Sicily, and the transitional areas in between. That same year, the Marshall Field Garden Apartments, a privately funded low-income housing development, was completed. In 1942, the Frances Cabrini Homes were completed—586 units in 54 two-story rowhouse buildings designed by Holsman, Burmeister, et al. Initial residency requirements specified 75% White and 25% Black occupancy. The development was named for Saint Frances Xavier Cabrini, an Italian-American nun canonized for her work with the poor. In 1957, the Cabrini Extension was added, consisting of 1,925 red brick units in mid- and high-rise buildings designed by A. Epstein & Sons. In 1962, the William Green Homes were completed north of Division Street, comprising 1,096 units designed by Pace Associates. These were named after William Green, a former president of the American Federation of Labor. In 1966, the lawsuit Gautreaux et al. v. Chicago Housing Authority was filed, alleging racially discriminatory practices in public housing placement. The CHA was found liable in 1969, and a consent decree was entered with the United States Department of Housing and Urban Development in 1981. From 1974 to 1979, the television sitcom Good Times aired on CBS, using exterior shots of Cabrini–Green in its opening and closing credits. Although set in public housing, the series did not explicitly name the complex.

From March 26 to April 19, 1981, Chicago Mayor Jane Byrne temporarily moved into Cabrini–Green to draw attention to crime in the area. In 1992, the horror film Candyman, set in Cabrini–Green, was released. In 1994, Chicago received one of the first HOPE VI grants to redevelop the area into a mixed-income neighborhood. Demolition of high-rise buildings began on September 27, 1995. In 1997, the Near North Redevelopment Initiative was introduced, recommending demolition of the Green Homes and most of the Cabrini Extension. In 1999, the Chicago Housing Authority launched the Plan for Transformation, a $1.5 billion initiative to demolish 18,000 units and build or rehabilitate 25,000 units, incorporating earlier Cabrini–Green redevelopment efforts.

Subsequent improvements included a new library, renovations to Seward Park, and a new shopping center. On December 9, 2010, the final building of the William Green Homes closed. On March 30, 2011, the last high-rise building at Cabrini–Green was demolished, accompanied by a public art presentation. Most of the Frances Cabrini rowhouses remain, though many are in poor condition or abandoned.

== Overview ==
Cabrini–Green consisted of ten sections constructed over a 20-year period: the Frances Cabrini Rowhouses (586 units, completed in 1942), Cabrini Extension North and South (1,925 units, completed in 1957), and the William Green Homes (1,096 units, completed in 1962). As of May 3, 2011, all high-rise buildings in the complex had been demolished. A total of 150 Frances Cabrini Rowhouses, located south of Oak Street, north of Chicago Avenue, west of Hudson Avenue, and east of Cambridge Street, have been renovated and remain occupied.

== Crime and response ==
=== Problems develop ===
Poverty and organized crime have been historically associated with the Cabrini–Green area. A 1931 map produced by Bruce-Roberts, Incorporated labeled the intersection of Oak Street and Milton Avenue (now Cleveland Avenue) as "Death Corner," noting it as the site of approximately 50 murders.

Initially, the housing was racially integrated, and many residents were employed. However, following World War II, nearby factories that had supported the local economy closed, leading to widespread job loss. At the same time, municipal disinvestment caused in part by suburbanization and white flight resulted in the reduction of public services, including building maintenance.

In an effort to cut costs, lawns were paved over, broken lights were left unrepaired for extended periods, and fire-damaged apartments were boarded up rather than restored. Later developments, such as the William Green Homes, were constructed with limited budgets, leading to issues related to poor construction quality and long-term maintenance challenges. Many buildings lacked interior hallways; instead, units were accessed via exterior concrete walkways enclosed in chain-link fencing, exposing residents to weather conditions, including harsh winter temperatures.

Unlike many of the city's other public housing projects, Cabrini–Green was located at the boundary of two of Chicago’s wealthiest neighborhoods, Lincoln Park and the Gold Coast, and less than a mile from the Magnificent Mile. Despite its proximity to affluent areas, the complex was marked by high poverty rates. Gang activity was prominent, with individual gangs controlling specific buildings, and residents often felt compelled to affiliate with them for protection.

At the height of Cabrini-Green's disinvestment, vandalism became widespread. Graffiti was common, and damage to building infrastructure—such as doors, windows, and elevators—was frequent. Pest infestations were widespread, and garbage frequently clogged trash chutes, at one point accumulating up to the 15th floor. Utilities, including water and electricity, were often unreliable and went unrepaired for extended periods.

Externally, the buildings displayed signs of deterioration, with boarded-up windows, charred sections of the façade, and paved-over green areas. In response to safety concerns, balconies were enclosed with fencing to prevent the disposal of trash from upper floors and to reduce the risk of falls or objects being thrown. This gave the structures an appearance resembling prison tiers or cages, drawing criticism from community leaders.

=== Brother Bill ===
In the 1980s, Catholic lay worker William "Brother Bill" Tomes Jr. regularly visited Cabrini–Green in an effort to reduce violence within the community. His work attracted national attention, and he was interviewed by Time magazine and multiple television networks.

== Demolition, redevelopment, and relocation ==
While Cabrini–Green experienced decline during the postwar period—marked by disinvestment, industrial departure, and white flight—the broader Near North Side of Chicago saw significant socioeconomic growth. Downtown employment shifted from manufacturing to professional services, increasing demand for middle-income housing. This spurred gentrification, which spread north from the Gold Coast along the lakefront, then westward and eventually across the Chicago River.

In the 1980s, the industrial area just south of Cabrini–Green and west of Michigan Avenue was redeveloped into the River North neighborhood, becoming a center for arts, entertainment, and later, the city’s technology sector. By the 1990s, former industrial land near the north branch of the Chicago River—surrounding Cabrini–Green to the north, south, and west—was converted into office, retail, and residential developments.

As property values increased, Cabrini–Green's location became more attractive to private developers. Speculators began acquiring land adjacent to the complex in anticipation of its eventual demolition. In May 1995, the U.S. Department of Housing and Urban Development (HUD) assumed control of the Chicago Housing Authority and began demolishing vacant "Reds" buildings in the Cabrini Extension, promoting a mixed-income model for public housing redevelopment.

In June 1996, the City of Chicago and the CHA introduced the Near North Redevelopment Initiative, a plan for new development on and around the Cabrini–Green site. The city’s ten-year Plan for Transformation, officially launched in 2000, called for the demolition of nearly all high-rise public housing in Chicago, including most of Cabrini–Green, with the exception of some remaining rowhouses.

=== Tenant response ===
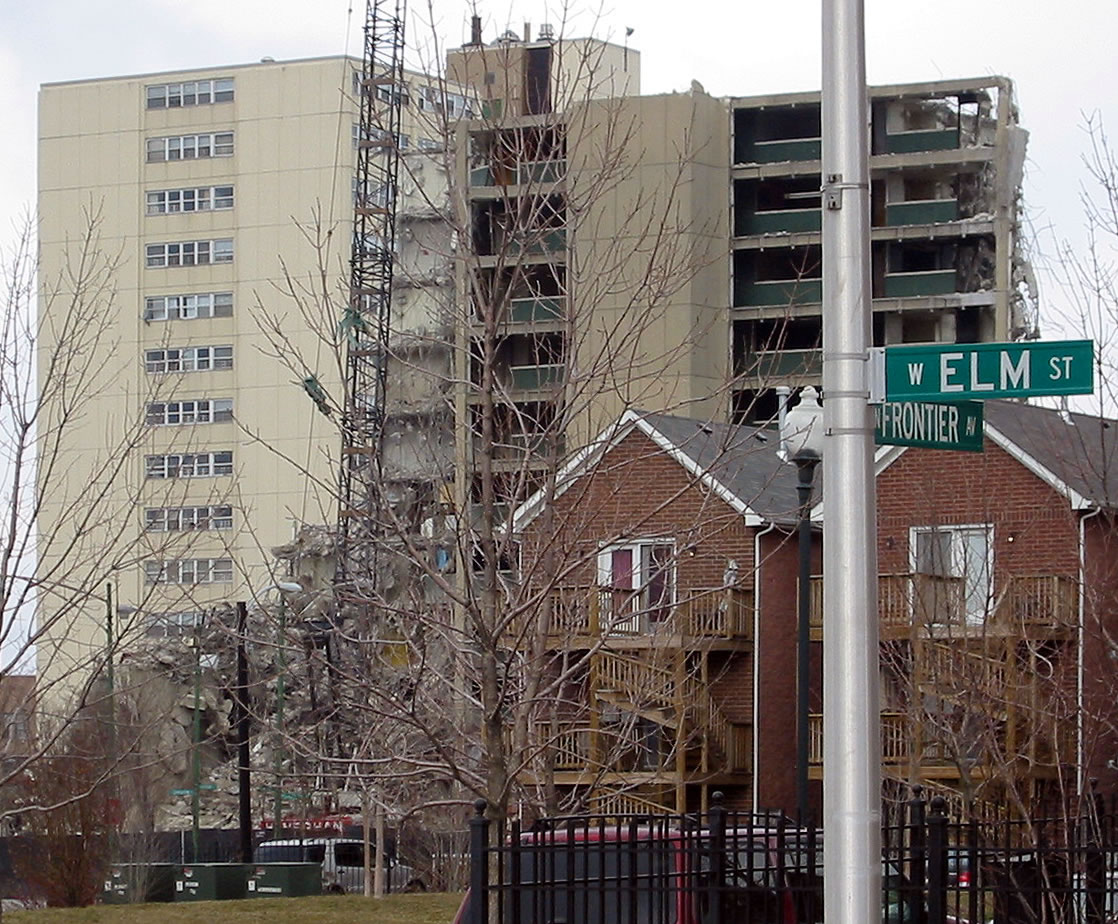
Newly built housing sharply contrasts with William Green Homes, under demolition in 2006. This is the demolition of 714 West Division Street, nicknamed "Goldmine".

Over the years, residents of Cabrini–Green had organized to advocate for assistance from the city and to support one another within the community. Marion Stamps, a prominent community leader, was the most visible resident organizing protests and strikes against the Chicago Housing Authority, city officials, and others on behalf of Cabrini–Green residents from the 1960s until her death in 1996. That same year, the federal government ordered the demolition of 18,000 public housing units in Chicago, as part of a nationwide initiative affecting tens of thousands of units.

Some tenant activists at Cabrini–Green worked to prevent displacement and advocated for continued access to public housing for low-income residents. These efforts led to a consent decree that allowed certain buildings to remain standing during redevelopment, enabling residents to remain in their homes until new housing became available. The agreement also provided displaced residents with guaranteed access to housing in the redeveloped neighborhood.

In 2001, a tenants group filed a lawsuit against the Chicago Housing Authority concerning relocation plans under the city's Plan for Transformation, a $1.4 billion initiative for public housing redevelopment. According to attorney Richard Wheelock, who represented the tenants, the pace of demolition outstripped that of reconstruction, resulting in displaced families being forced to seek housing in other segregated or unsafe neighborhoods or risk becoming homeless.

In 1997, the same year as the attack on Girl X, community leaders formed the Alliance for Community Peace for "mentoring and recreation to area youth" which later expanded citywide.

=== Demolition ===
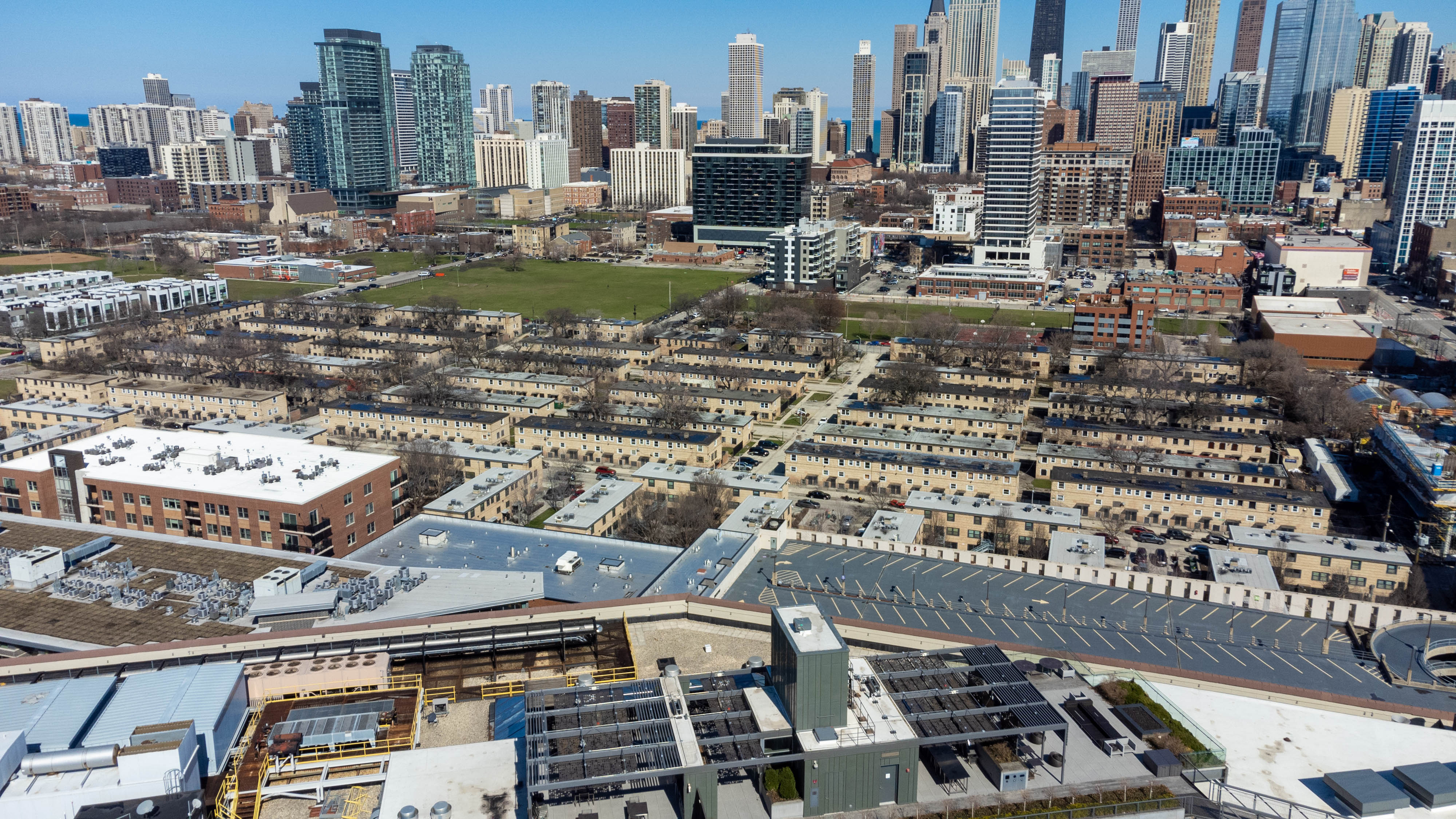
The Cabrini Green rowhouses in April 2022

Demolition of the Cabrini Extension was completed in 2002. Part of the cleared area was incorporated into Seward Park, while construction of new mixed-income housing began on the remaining land in 2006. Beginning in 1994, subsidized mixed-income housing developments were initiated on nearby underused or vacant parcels, including the Orchard Park senior housing complex, along with sites formerly occupied by an Oscar Mayer factory and the Montgomery Ward Company Complex.

Today, new market-rate housing nearly surrounds the remaining public housing structures. Redevelopment plans for the 70-acre (280,000 m^{2}) Cabrini–Green site included 30% public housing replacement units and 20% workforce-affordable housing. Adjacent luxury developments include 20% affordable units, half designated as public housing replacements, with an additional 505 replacement units planned for off-site construction.

In February 2006, a redevelopment partnership between the Chicago Housing Authority, Holsten, Kimball Hill Urban Centers, and the Cabrini–Green LAC Community Development Corporation began a $250 million, 790-unit project called Parkside at Old Town, located on the 18-acre (73,000 m^{2}) Cabrini Extension site. Demolition of the William Green Homes was completed in 2011. Most of the remaining Cabrini rowhouses are in disrepair, with many abandoned and slated for demolition and redevelopment.

The Plan for Transformation’s relocation process led to the lawsuit Wallace v. Chicago Housing Authority, which alleged that displaced residents were placed in substandard temporary housing, did not receive promised social services, and were often denied the opportunity to return to redeveloped sites. The case was settled in June 2006. Under the settlement, two relocation programs were established: the existing CHA program to support moves to racially integrated areas with case-managed services, and a modified program administered by CHAC Inc., intended to increase access to economically and racially integrated communities and to social services.

Some former residents relocated to suburbs such as Harvey, Illinois or to other public housing sites in nearby cities. Others moved into newly built CHA replacement housing. Reports indicate that residents of the mixed-income developments have experienced fewer crime-related issues. The final two families residing in Cabrini–Green were relocated by court order on December 1, 2010.

Following the closure of Cabrini–Green, crime in the area declined significantly; only one homicide was reported in the first half of 2006. The final phase of demolition was completed in 2011. However, plaintiffs in the Wallace case and others have argued that the relocation process contributed to increased socioeconomic and racial segregation, homelessness, and related issues by moving residents into other disinvested neighborhoods, primarily on Chicago's south and west sides.

A film showing images of the final days of Cabrini–Green. The flashing lights were part of an art installation installed after the buildings were vacant but just before demolition.

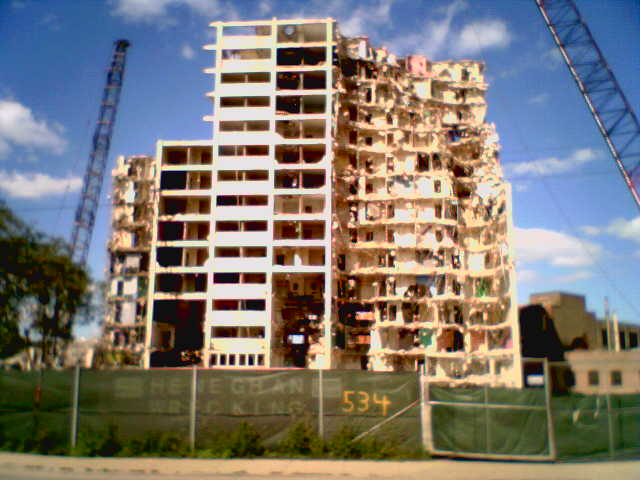
The demolition of William Green Homes in 2006. This is the demolition of 534 West Division Street, nicknamed "Tha Jube".

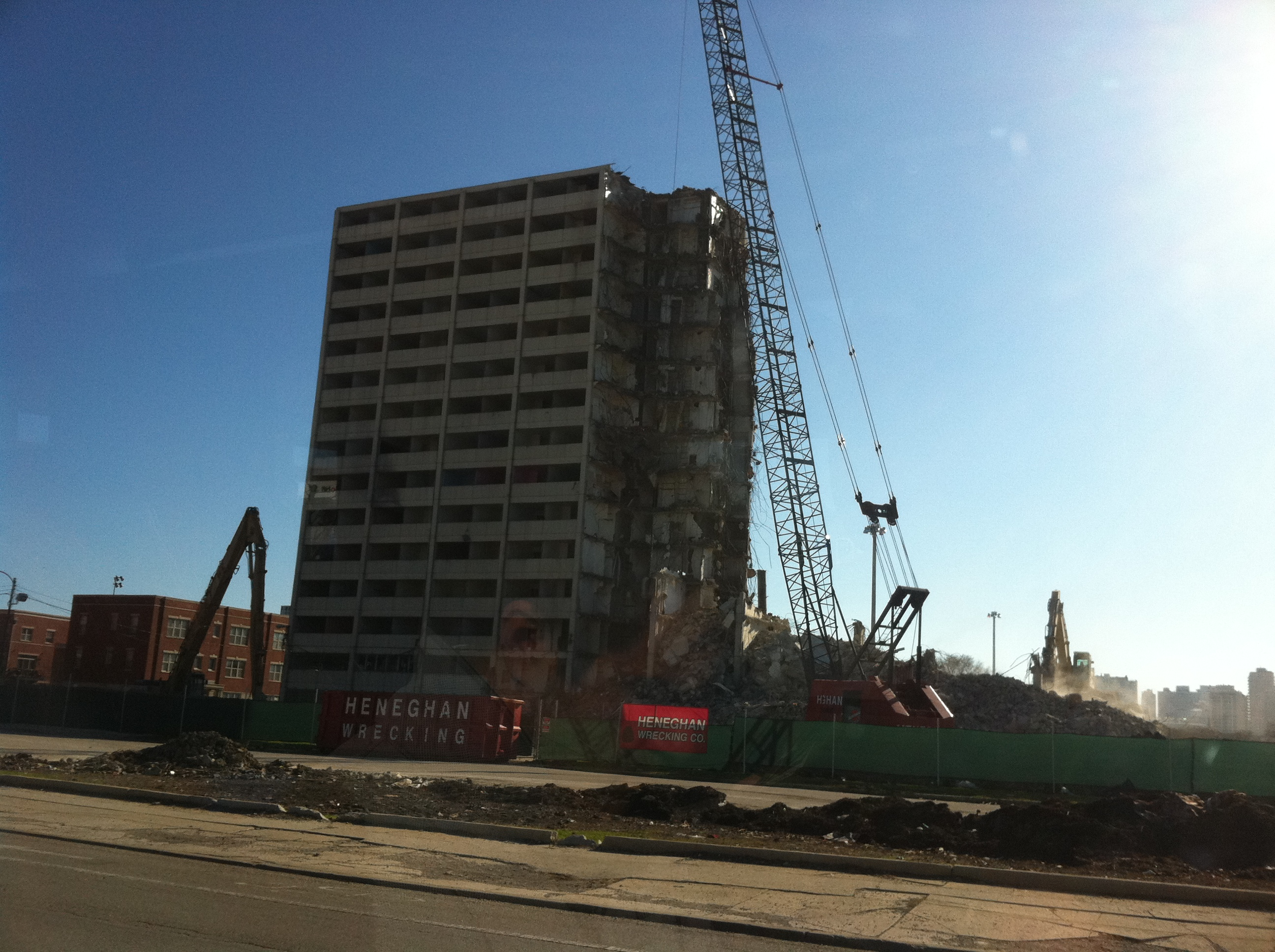
The last building of Cabrini–Green being demolished in 2011

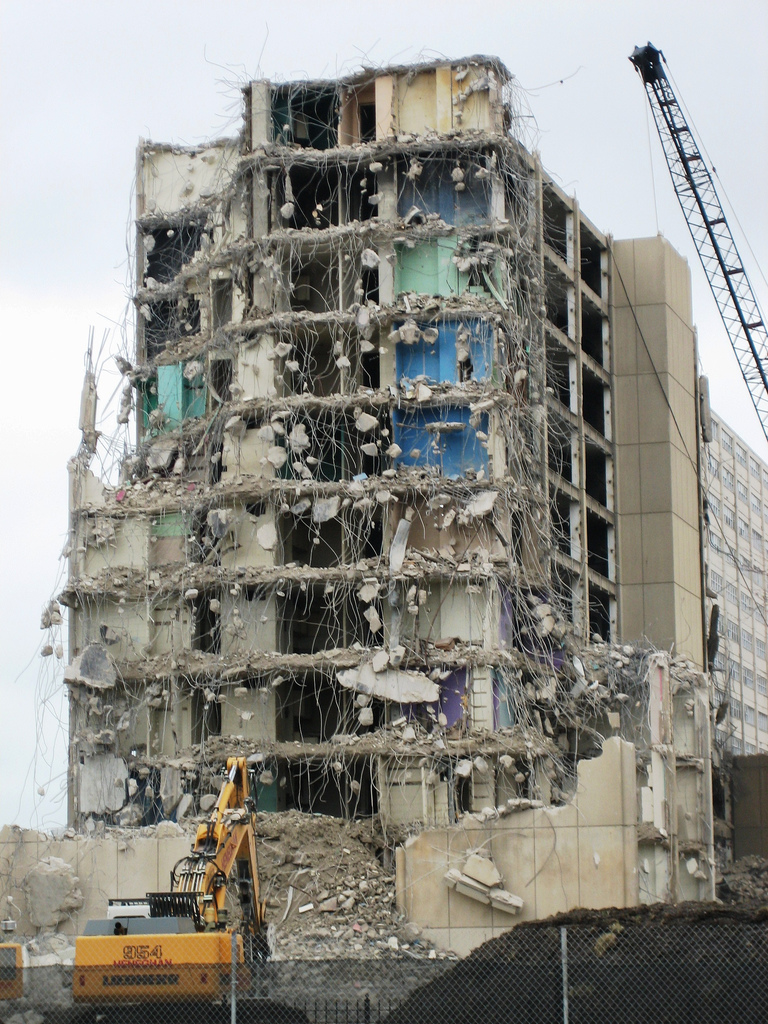
The demolition of one of the Cabrini–Green buildings

== Reputation ==
While Cabrini–Green was often viewed negatively by non-residents, some long-term residents interviewed by the Chicago Tribune in 2004 expressed complex feelings about the complex's closure. Despite the building's poor physical condition, many described strong community ties and mutual support among residents. They expressed concern over the displacement and fragmentation of the community as redevelopment progressed. Although the buildings were in disrepair, the extremely low rent and proximity to downtown and the lakefront gave low-income residents access to areas they otherwise could not afford.

Cabrini–Green frequently drew negative media attention. Among Chicago's public housing projects, Cabrini–Green became the most widely known and publicized, both locally and nationally, surpassing others such as the Robert Taylor Homes and Stateway Gardens on the South Side, and Rockwell Gardens and the Henry Horner Homes on the West Side.

Several notable events, including annual New Year's Eve celebrations during which gang members discharged firearms into the air, prompting police to routinely block off surrounding streets, contributed to Cabrini–Green's reputation. On July 17, 1970, Chicago police patrolman Anthony N. Rizzato and Sergeant James Severin were fatally shot from an apartment window by gang members while crossing a baseball field within the complex. The attack was reportedly carried out to establish a pact between rival gangs. Three adults and one juvenile were charged with the murders; the two shooters received prison sentences of 100 to 199 years.

In 1981, the gang killings of 11 made national attention. That same year, in March, Mayor Jane Byrne and her husband Jay McMullen moved into a fourth-floor apartment at 1160 N. Sedgwick Street in an effort to highlight concerns over safety in the complex. Her stay, supported by police officers and personal security, lasted three weeks. The move further reinforced Cabrini–Green's negative public image as a symbol of the challenges facing public housing.

On October 13, 1992, seven-year-old Dantrell Davis was shot in the head and killed by a sniper's bullet while walking to Jenner Elementary School with his mother.

On January 9, 1997, a nine-year-old girl nicknamed "Girl X" was raped, poisoned, and strangled in a stairwell of the 1121 N. Larrabee Street building, leaving her permanently blind, paralyzed, and mute due to brain damage. The assailant used a marker to write gang symbols on her abdomen in an attempt to mislead investigators and left her face down in the snow in an unlit hallway, where she was discovered by a janitor who resigned that same day. Patrick Sykes, a 25-year-old resident who was not affiliated with any gang, was later apprehended, confessed in detail to the crime, and was sentenced to the maximum penalty allowed by the state—120 years in prison.

The case drew significant media attention. Two Chicago reporters highlighted the broader community’s indifference to conditions in Cabrini–Green, citing Girl X as a stark example. Four years after the attack, Girl X testified in court. Judge Joseph Urso ruled that the Chicago Housing Authority was negligent in its maintenance and security of the building and awarded the family $3 million for her long-term care.

Local Little League coach Daniel Coyle documented his experiences in the community in his 1994 book Hardball: A Season in the Projects, describing the persistent challenges as “A well-meaning person shows up three times a week. But nothing changes.” The 2001 film Hardball was based on this book.

== Education ==
Chicago Public Schools (CPS) operates the public schools in the City of Chicago. Most teenagers living in Cabrini–Green attended William H. Wells High School or Lincoln Park High School. Near North Career Metropolitan High School, which evolved from Cooley Vocational High School and was located at Larrabee and Blackhawk, served students from 1979 until its closure in 2001.

At its peak, five CPS elementary schools served the neighborhood: Richard E. Byrd Community Academy, Edward Jenner School, Manierre School, Schiller Community Academy, and Truth School. During the 1970–1971 school year, enrollment across five neighborhood grade schools—Cooley Upper Grade Center, Byrd, Jenner, Manierre, and Schiller—totaled 6,144 students. By 1997, Cooley had closed, and the combined enrollment of the remaining four schools had dropped to 2,361. Factors contributing to this decline included demolition of residential buildings, decreasing family sizes, increased vacancy rates, and a growing proportion of adult residents.

During the 2003–2004 school year, fifth-grade students from Room 405 at Richard E. Byrd Community Academy created a detailed plan urging the City of Chicago and the Chicago Board of Education to build a new school. They cited inadequate facilities, including the lack of a lunchroom, gymnasium, and auditorium, and issues such as malfunctioning heat that forced students to wear winter clothing indoors. As part of their advocacy, students sent letters and emails, conducted surveys, created petitions, interviewed officials, and produced videos and a website to raise awareness. Their efforts received local and national attention. In 2004, Byrd students were rezoned to Jenner, and Byrd was closed. By 2008, the building remained vacant.

As of 2008, only three of these schools remained in use, and by 2013 only Manierre and Jenner continued operating as K–8 schools.

In the early 2010s, CPS considered merging Jenner and Manierre, but concerns involving students crossing gang territorial lines meant that both schools remained open. Manierre is located in an area known as “Sedville,” a gang territory in Old Town.

Freidrich von Schiller School served students from the William Green Homes. Originally located in two buildings at 640 West Scott Street—one constructed around 1963 and another approximately a century old—the school was redeveloped in 1969 when the city approved a new campus for Schiller. The new facility, built on a 10.3-acre (4.2 ha) site, was scheduled to open in September 1970 and cost $2.5 million. It was designed to include a “Schome” (meaning "school-home") for preschoolers and a separate building for elementary students, with a total capacity of 1,635 students. Schiller closed in 2009, and students were reassigned to Jenner. The building is now occupied by Skinner North, a selective school.

Currently, the area is served by Ogden International School, which maintains a preschool and middle school campus in the area. Before merging into Ogden in 2018, the building housed Jenner Academy of the Arts. In 2016, Jenner had 239 students, 98% of whom were Black, with nearly all from low-income households. The building had a capacity for 1,060 students. Enrollment declined significantly after the demolition of Cabrini–Green. The process to merge Jenner into Ogden International began in the late 2010s.

== Parks and recreation ==
The New City YMCA opened in 1981. Due to concerns about crime in the surrounding neighborhood, it was constructed without windows to minimize the risk of damage from stray bullets. The facility served both residents of Cabrini–Green and the nearby Lincoln Park neighborhood. According to CBS Chicago, the YMCA was credited with helping to bridge social and economic divides between families from different backgrounds.

In 2007, the YMCA closed, and the property was sold as the population of Cabrini–Green declined due to relocation and redevelopment.

== Notable people ==
- Jerry Butler, soul singer.
- Terry Callier, soul musician.
- William Gates, high school and college basketball player and subject of the 1994 documentary film Hoop Dreams
- Greg Hollimon, comedic actor
- Eddie T. Johnson, police superintendent.
- Major Lance, R&B singer and father of Georgia Governor-Elect Keisha Lance Bottoms
- Ramsey Lewis, jazz pianist
- Curtis Mayfield, soul musician.
- Richard Sennett, Professor of Sociology at the London School of Economics and former Professor of the Humanities at New York University.

== In popular culture ==
=== Comics ===
- In Frank Miller's Give Me Liberty dystopic graphic novel, Cabrini-Green is a de facto prison for poor African-Americans.
- In Suicide Squad, Amanda Waller is established as a widow who escaped Cabrini–Green with her surviving family after her two eldest children and her husband were murdered.

=== Film ===
- The opening shot and many scenes in the 1975 film Cooley High take place at the Cabrini–Green Homes, and the film portrays the lives of young people in those projects. The film's creator, Eric Monte, was raised at Cabrini–Green Homes and attended the real-life Cooley Vocational High School.
- In the 1992 horror film Candyman, Cabrini–Green appears as the focal point of the titular character's supernatural activity. Part of the movie was filmed at the housing project over the course of three days. The 2021 sequel Candyman revisited Cabrini–Green.
- The 2001 movie Hardball was a chronicle of Little League baseball in Chicago's Cabrini-Green housing project.
- The documentary 70 Acres in Chicago, about Cabrini–Green by Ronit Bezalel, who spent two decades there beginning in 1995, was screened at the Gene Siskel Film Center in 2015.
- The 2023 movie We Grown Now is set in Cabrini-Green in the early 1990s.

=== Television ===
- The buildings are shown in the opening and closing credits of Good Times. Cabrini-Green is never mentioned specifically, but only referred to as "The Projects", although the address that's sometimes mentioned -- 963 North Gilbert Avenue -- would place the building in the heart of Cabrini-Green. The series is focused on the Evans family, residents of a two-bedroom apartment unit on the 17th floor of a high-rise tower. Much is mentioned during the series about the poor condition of the facility (crime, broken down elevators, broken light bulbs, failing heat, water, etc.) Former resident Eric Monte was creator of the show.
- In the television series Boss, Cabrini–Green serves as the inspiration and filming location for the "Lennox Gardens" housing project.
- The television series Lady Blue filmed one of its first episodes, "Death Valley Day", on location at the development, which was called "The Heights" and depicted as being dominated by a gang. The poor condition of the building, and features such as the fence-railings on the upper floors, are visible throughout (at the episode's climax, one gang member falls to his death when he is pushed through one of the fences). According to series star Jamie Rose, residents objected to the film crew being there and began throwing bottles at them.i
- In the CBS daytime drama, Beyond the Gates, matriarch Anita Williams Dupree, played by Tamara Tunie, grew up in the Cabrini-Green projects.
- In the television series “The Bernie Mac Show”, Bernie’s nieces and nephew, are originally from Cabrini-Green.

=== Video games ===
- The Rossi-Fremont housing projects in the video game Watch Dogs were inspired by both Cabrini-Green and the Robert Taylor Homes.
- A version of Cabrini-Green appears as part of Chicago in Driver 2

== See also ==
- Pruitt-Igoe, St. Louis, Missouri
- Kowloon Walled City, Hong Kong
- Vladeck Houses, Manhattan, New York City
- Parkchester, The Bronx, New York City
- Broadwater Farm, London, England
- Red Road Flats, Glasgow, Scotland
- Ballymun Flats, Dublin, Ireland
- Towers in the park
