= Murder of Dantrell Davis =

1992 child murder in Chicago, Illinois, US

- Davis in an undated photograph
- Location: Cabrini–Green, Chicago, Illinois, U.S.
- Date: October 13, 1992; 34 years ago
- Weapon: Sniper rifle
- Perpetrator: Anthony Garrett

Dantrell Davis (July 31, 1985 – October 13, 1992) was an African-American boy from Chicago, Illinois, who was murdered in October 1992. Davis was walking to school with his mother in the Cabrini-Green neighborhood, when he was accidentally shot by Anthony Garrett, the leader of a local street gang, who intended to shoot a rival. Dantrell's death sparked an increased awareness of the extensive violence occurring in Chicago's inner-city projects, and led to the first street gang truce in Cabrini–Green, which lasted for three years. Garrett was convicted of first-degree murder for Davis' death, and received a 100-year sentence.

== Murder ==
Shortly after 9:00 a.m. on the morning of October 13, 1992, 7-year-old Dantrell Davis was walking with his mother Annette Freeman to Jenner Elementary School where he was a first grader, from his home at 502 W. Oak Street, a 19–story high-rise belonging to the Chicago Housing Authority in the Cabrini-Green housing project in Chicago's Near North Side. While walking to school, Davis was struck by a bullet fired by Anthony Garrett, who was perched on the 10th-floor of a vacant apartment building, and was pronounced dead at Children's Memorial Hospital. Garrett was arrested only hours after he shot Davis, and the following day signed a 5 1/2-page confession stating that he was aiming to kill rival gang members when he accidentally shot Davis as he walked past his target. Garrett was indicted on first degree murder charges on November 5, 1992, and sentenced to 100 years in prison on March 8, 1994.

== Aftermath ==
The murder of Davis gained national attention, and brought an increasing awareness to the street violence that was rampant in Chicago's inner-city housing projects. The reputation of Cabrini-Green worsened further, which had already become synonymous with the problems associated with public housing in the United States. Davis' death was one of several events that contributed to Cabrini-Green's gradual demolition and redevelopment of Cabrini-Green beginning in the late 1990s.

On March 5, 1993, the section of N Cleveland Avenue between W Oak Street and W Hobbie Street, where Davis had been killed, was given the honorary name Dantrell Davis Way. The honorary street sign still remains, although much of the Cabrini–Green housing project, including Davis' home and the building from which he was shot, have since been demolished. Derek Ault, a teacher at Jenner Elementary School, started the Dantrell Davis Peace Party.

== See also ==
- List of homicides in Illinois
- History of African Americans in Chicago
- Murder of Stephanie Kuhen
