= Cooley Vocational High School =

- Main entrance, c. 1977.

Location
- 1225 N. Sedgwick Street; Chicago, Illinois 60610; United States; 41.9053°N 87.6381°W

Information
- School type: Public; Secondary; Vocational; Middle
- Opened: September 1958
- Status: Demolished
- Closed: June 1979
- School district: Chicago Public Schools
- Grades: 7–12
- Gender: Coed
- Enrollment: 536 (1978–1979)
- Campus type: Urban
- Colors: Orange; Black
- Athletics conference: Chicago Public League
- Team name: Comets
- Accreditation: North Central Association of Colleges and Schools
- Newspaper: Cooley Times
- Yearbook: Comets' Trails

Edwin Gilbert Cooley Vocational High School (also known as Cooley Vocational High School and Upper Grade Center, commonly known as Cooley High) was a public 4–year vocational high school and middle school located in the Old Town neighborhood on the Near North Side of Chicago, Illinois, United States.

Opened primarily to serve Cabrini-Green in 1958, Cooley was housed in a high school building constructed in 1907, which had housed trade schools. It was a part of the Chicago Public Schools district and served grades 7 through 12. Cooley was named in honor of Edwin Gilbert Cooley (1857–1923), who served as superintendent of Chicago Public Schools from 1900 until 1909. Cooley closed in June 1979.

== History ==
=== Building uses ===
Constructed between 1905 and 1907, the building that housed Cooley located at Sedgwick Avenue and Division Street was the original location for Albert G. Lane Manual Training High School (now known as Lane Tech College Prep), a then all boys vocational school which opened the following year. By 1931, Lane's enrollment had soared to 7,000, which caused over-crowding issues within the building. The Chicago Board of Education chose a new site for Lane which opened in 1934. Once Lane moved from the location, the building then housed Washburne Vocational High School (which later became known as Washburne Trade School).

=== Cooley ===
Washburne occupied the building until the neighborhood's population grew to record high numbers. At that time Cabrini-Green, a Chicago Housing Authority public housing complex located around the school population had reached about 15,000 residents. Due to this, It became a need for another public high school in the community to prevent over crowding at nearby Lincoln Park High School (then known as Robert A. Waller High School) and Wells High School. After Washburne was relocated to the south side of the city in January 1958, Chicago Public Schools purposed a new school for the vacant building to the Board of Education.

Proposed was a public neighborhood vocational high school with an upper grade center; seventh and eighth grade program. Approved by the Chicago Board of Education, The school opened as Edwin Gilbert Cooley Vocational High School in September 1958 for the 1958–1959 school year. When the school opened, The enrollment was around 1,700; with the student body being made up of 69% White and 41% African–American. By the end of the 1963–1964 school year, the African–American student population at the school had increased while the White population decreased drastically by 78%. The school's student body was predominately African-American with a percentage of 98%, most of whom lived in Cabrini by 1967. During the 1967–1968 school year, Problems began to emerge within the school and Cooley administration and local school council voiced concerns to school board officials about issues with the school's outdated and aged facilities.

In November 1968, School board officials proposed a plan to co-locate Cooley with Waller High School; constructing a building on vacant land near the Waller campus. Cooley's administration objected to the proposal, citing the co–location would phase out its current student body who resided at the north–west end of the district; stating a new school should be built near its current location. Members of the Lincoln Park Conservation Association also rejected the proposal, citing differences within Cooley and Waller school communities.

In October 1969, The school board had voted to phase out Cooley once the new vocational annex on Waller campus was completed. Scheduled to be completed in 1971, The plan was cancelled. By the 1969–1970 school year, Cooley was regarded as one of the city's poorest performing vocational schools with a drop-out rate of 32%. After the co-location plan was canceled, The board still voted to replace Cooley's building which was described as "beyond deplorable" by 1975.

==== Athletics ====
Cooley competed in the Chicago Public League (CPL) and was a member of the Illinois High School Association (IHSA). The school's sport teams were known as the Comets.

==== Closure ====
In November 1974, the Chicago Board of Education voted on a site for the new school site, named the Larrabee-Ogden-Clybourn triangle. The school board began phasing out Cooley during the 1975–1976 school year due to low academic performance, the poor condition of the building and the lack of vocational programs which failed to attract students from outside the area. The school was closed after the 1978–1979 school year, sending its remaining students to the new Near North Career Magnet High School located north-west of Cooley which opened the following school year. Cooley was later demolished in 1981.

== Other information ==
In 1969, Ralph J. Cusick served as principal of Cooley and Waller High School during negotiations to merge both schools. Dr. Edward C. Bennett served as principal of Cooley from August 1970 until it was closed in June 1979.

=== Crime ===
On September 22, 1969, 17-year-old junior Johnnie Veal was attacked in the school's basement, resulting in his throat being slashed. The attack was prompted by his switch in street gang affiliation the previous day. Veal was found around 11:30 a.m. by the school's security guard. He survived the attack.

=== In popular culture ===
The high school was the subject of the 1975 film Cooley High, written by Eric Monte, an alumnus of the real-life Cooley High who based the film on his experiences attending the school and growing up in Cabrini-Green. Cooley High was also mentioned in songs by rappers such as Nas and the Wu-Tang Clan. The R&B group Boyz II Men named their first album Cooleyhighharmony as an homage to the school.

== Notable alumni ==
- Jerry Butler (class of 1957) – R&B singer–songwriter, commissioner (Cook County, Illinois)
- John Wayne Gacy, (attended) – serial killer.
- Eric Monte, (attended) – screenwriter
- Marvin Yancy, (class of 1968) – Gospel singer–songwriter, pastor and former husband of Natalie Cole.
