= Cooley High =

1975 film by Michael Schultz

- Theatrical release poster
- Directed by: Michael Schultz
- Written by: Eric Monte
- Produced by: Steve Krantz; Samuel Z. Arkoff
- Starring: Glynn Turman; Lawrence Hilton-Jacobs; Garrett Morris; Cynthia Davis
- Cinematography: Paul vom Brack
- Edited by: Christopher Holmes
- Music by: Freddie Perren
- Distributed by: American International Pictures
- Release date: June 25, 1975
- Running time: 117 minutes
- Country: United States
- Language: English
- Budget: $750,000
- Box office: $13 million or $2.6 million

Cooley High is a 1975 American independent hood coming-of-age comedy-drama film that follows the narrative of two high school seniors and best friends, Leroy "Preach" Jackson (Glynn Turman) and Richard "Cochise" Morris (Lawrence Hilton-Jacobs). Written by Eric Monte and directed by Michael Schultz, the film, primarily shot in Chicago, was a major hit at the box office, grossing over US$13 million. The light-hearted-turned-tragic storyline was complemented by a soundtrack featuring many Motown hits.

In a 40th-year retrospective by NPR in 2015, Cooley High was called a "classic of black cinema" and "a touchstone for filmmakers like John Singleton and Spike Lee." In 2021, the film was selected for preservation in the United States National Film Registry by the Library of Congress for being "culturally, historically, or aesthetically significant".

== Plot ==
In 1964 Chicago, Leroy "Preach" Jackson and his best friend, Richard "Cochise" Morris, are in the final weeks of their senior year at Cooley Vocational High School in the Near North Side. They sneak out of class one Friday and spend the day at Lincoln Park Zoo with two friends, Pooter and Willie. After catching the L train back to school, the gang goes to Martha's, a soul food hangout, where Preach falls in love with classmate Brenda while shooting craps with neighborhood hoodlums Stone and Robert. Cochise and Preach make a dollar bet on whether Preach can get Brenda into bed, after which Preach gets kicked out by a cleaver-wielding Martha for gambling.

When Cochise gets home from Martha's, he gets a letter from Grambling State University informing him that he has received a basketball scholarship. That night, Cochise, Preach, Pooter, Willie, and another friend, Tyrone, attend a party hosted by Tyrone's girlfriend, Dorothy, at her apartment. Brenda is also in attendance, and she and Preach bond over a mutual interest in poetry during a slow dance. Meanwhile, Cochise gets into a fistfight with hotheaded classmate Damon after he catches him kissing his girlfriend, Loretta, and the fight trashes Dorothy's apartment and ends the party.

The boys go to Martha's, where Stone and Robert pull up in a stolen Cadillac Coupe de Ville and convince Preach and Cochise to get in with them. Stone lets Preach drive, and the four speed through downtown Chicago and get into a high-speed chase with police at a Navy Pier warehouse after Preach runs a red light. They evade the police, but Preach accidentally rear ends a parked car, causing the four to flee before the police arrive.

On Saturday, Preach and Cochise go to the movies with their friends, during which a huge fight erupts after Pooter accidentally steps on a man's foot. On Sunday, Preach and Brenda make love after spending a romantic day together. However, Preach reveals the dollar bet he made with Cochise, causing Brenda to leave in anger. On Monday, Preach and Cochise are scheduled to take a history midterm, but they are arrested right before the test for their joyride in the Cadillac. Mr. Mason, the boys' history teacher, persuades one of the detectives, a close friend, to let them go because of their clean records. Stone and Robert, however, remain in jail due to being repeat offenders. After Preach and Cochise are released, Stone and Robert wrongly assume that they snitched on them.

A few days later, Preach discovers that Mr. Mason got him and Cochise out of jail, and he sets off to find Cochise to tell him. He finds Cochise with his ex-girlfriend, Sandra, who Preach cheated on with Brenda. Preach becomes angry and retreats to Martha's, where he sees Brenda and apologizes for what happened between them. However, Damon is there, and Stone and Robert show up after being released from jail. Still believing Preach and Cochise snitched on them, Stone and Robert, along with Damon, chase Preach.

After evading the trio, Preach meets up with Brenda on the L train, where she informs him that Cochise went to Martha's looking for him. Stone, Robert, and Damon find Cochise under the L train tracks and beat him so severely that he dies, then flee. Preach frantically searches for Cochise before discovering his lifeless body.

At Cochise's funeral, Preach watches from afar and goes to the casket for a personal farewell after the mourners have departed. Toasting absent friends, Preach drinks from a wine bottle and recites a poem he wrote for Cochise. After promising Cochise that he and their friends will be fine, Preach runs away from the cemetery feeling confident in his future.

The epilogue reveals that Preach moved to Hollywood after graduation and became a successful screenwriter; Stone and Robert were killed in 1966 during a gas station holdup; Brenda became a librarian in Atlanta, got married, and had three children; Damon joined the Army and became a sergeant stationed in Europe; Pooter became a factory worker in Muncie, Indiana; and Tyrone was killed at the 1968 Democratic National Convention in Chicago during an outbreak of racial violence.

== Cast ==
- Glynn Turman as Leroy "Preach" Jackson
- Lawrence Hilton-Jacobs as Richard "Cochise" Morris
- Garrett Morris as Mr. Mason
- Cynthia Davis as Brenda
- Sherman Smith as Stone
- Norman Gibson as Robert
- Corin Rogers as "Pooter"
- Joseph Carter Wilson as Tyrone
- Maurice Marshall as Damon
- Steven Williams as Jimmy Lee
- Christine Jones as Sandra
- Jackie Taylor as Johnny Mae
- Juanita McConnell as Martha

== Background ==
Monte based the film on his experiences attending the real-life Cooley Vocational High School (which closed in 1979) that served students from the Cabrini–Green public housing project on Chicago's north side. While the film was set in and around Cabrini–Green, it was primarily filmed at another Chicago-area housing project. Monte has said that he wrote the film to dispel myths about growing up in the projects: "I grew up in the Cabrini–Green housing project and I had one of the best times of my life, the most fun you can have while inhaling and exhaling".

=== Production ===
The movie was filmed from October through November 1974 in Chicago, Illinois. Some scenes include other areas of Chicago such as Navy Pier and the Gold Coast area but primarily in and around the Cabrini-Green housing project on the near-north side. Interior school scenes were shot at Chicago's Providence St. Mel High School.

== Soundtrack ==
The soundtrack of Cooley High, produced and arranged by Freddie Perren, features numerous songs by artists belonging to the Motown record label, as well as instrumental compositions written by Perren. It also features the original song "It's So Hard to Say Goodbye to Yesterday", written by Perren and Christine Yarian and performed by G. C. Cameron for the film.

Cooley High (Soundtrack)

Soundtrack album by Various artists
- Released: 1975
- Studios: Cherokee and Western Recorders, Hollywood, California
- Genre: Pop
- Length: 60:37
- Label: Motown
- Producer: Freddie Perren

=== Track listing ===
No.	Title	Writer(s)	Artist(s)	Length
1.	"Baby Love"	Holland–Dozier–Holland	Diana Ross & the Supremes	2:39
2.	"Fingertips"	Henry Cosby; Clarence Paul	Stevie Wonder	5:27
3.	"I Can't Help Myself (Sugar Pie Honey Bunch)"	Holland–Dozier–Holland	Four Tops	2:41
4.	"Stop! In the Name of Love"	Holland–Dozier–Holland	Diana Ross & the Supremes	2:51
5.	"Luther's Blues"	Luther Allison	Luther Allison	6:10
6.	"Dancing in the Street"	Marvin Gaye; Ivy Jo Hunter; William "Mickey" Stevenson	Martha Reeves & the Vandellas	2:38
7.	"Beechwood 4-5789"	Marvin Gaye; George Gordy; William "Mickey" Stevenson	The Marvelettes	2:07
8.	"Ooo Baby Baby"	Smokey Robinson	Smokey Robinson & the Miracles	2:42
9.	"(You Can) Depend on Me"	Berry Gordy; Smokey Robinson	Smokey Robinson & the Miracles	3:06
10.	"Cleo's Mood"	Autry DeWalt; Willie Woods; Harvey Fuqua	Jr. Walker & the All Stars	2:40
11.	"Money (That's What I Want)"	Berry Gordy; Janie Bradford	Barrett Strong	2:32
12.	"You Beat Me to the Punch"	Smokey Robinson	Mary Wells	2:42
13.	"2 Pigs and a Hog"	Freddie Perren	Freddie Perren	1:46
14.	"My Girl"	Smokey Robinson; Ronald White	The Temptations	2:54
15.	"Sweet First Love"	Freddie Perren	Freddie Perren	1:12
16.	"3 A.M.... I Love You Mama"	Freddie Perren	Freddie Perren	2:10
17.	"(I'm a) Road Runner"	Holland–Dozier–Holland	Jr. Walker & the All Stars	2:45
18.	"Mickey's Monkey"	Holland–Dozier–Holland	Smokey Robinson & the Miracles	2:47
19.	"Haulin'"	Freddie Perren	Freddie Perren	1:20
20.	"Cold Blooded"	Freddie Perren	Freddie Perren	1:15
21.	"It's So Hard to Say Goodbye to Yesterday"	Freddie Perren; Christine Yarian	G. C. Cameron	3:13
22.	"Reach Out I'll Be There"	Holland–Dozier–Holland	Four Tops	3:00
Total length:				60:37

== Influence ==
Cooley High is seen as "changing the landscape" for black people in film, with its humane focus on the dreams of young inner-city black men, according to actor and film director Robert Townsend, who got his start in film with a one-line walk-on role in Cooley High. Screenwriter and producer Larry Karaszewski holds that the film is also one of the great movies about real friendship, with outstanding performances by the male leads. Boyz II Men named their debut album Cooleyhighharmony which featured a version of "It's So Hard to Say Goodbye to Yesterday" from the Cooley High soundtrack. The 1991 movie Boyz n the Hood was influenced by Cooley High.

During the 40th anniversary of the film's release, National Public Radio published a story that discussed some of the fondest memories that the cast and crew shared of the film's production. Actor Sherman Smith, now using the professional name Rick Stone, who played the character of Stone in the film, recalled how he was approached by producers of the film while playing basketball one day. The crew members were looking for realistic gang members to be a part of the cast, so after being tipped off by police, producers offered Stone and his sidekick Norman Gibson, who played the character of Robert in the film, a role in the movie.

During this interview, screenwriter Eric Monte revealed that Cochise's untimely death in the film was inspired by a childhood friend of his who had been killed in a similar manner. Just as Preach headed to Hollywood after the death of Cochise, Monte reveals that after his friend was murdered, he hitchhiked his way to the west coast where he began working for shows such as Good Times and The Jeffersons. Unfortunately, not everyone from the film went on to live a life of success. Nearly two years after the film's release, Norman Gibson was gunned down outside of his neighborhood.

== Reception and legacy ==
Cooley High was a critical and commercial success. Produced on a $750,000 budget, the film grossed $13 million at the domestic box office, making it one of the top 30 highest-grossing films of 1975.

Jack Slater of The New York Times was positive, writing, "To be black and to watch 'Cooley High' is to see one's vanished innocence—and beauty." Slater acknowledged that the movie was being hailed as "a black American Graffiti" but he thought Cooley High had "far more vitality and variety" than that film. Gene Siskel of the Chicago Tribune gave the film 3.5 stars out of 4 and wrote that the opening 10 minutes "leave you with the impression that 'Cooley High' is going to be nothing more than a series of routine and unfunny gags. But then the film's magic begins to work, and 'Cooley High' turns into a beguiling story that's affecting, lasting, and worth seeing more than once."

Arthur D. Murphy of Variety called it "a heartening comedy drama" with "a fine cast of young players" that were "well directed by Michael Schultz", adding that "you don't have to be black to enjoy it immensely." Kevin Thomas of the Los Angeles Times called it "a landmark movie, one of the year's most important and heartening pictures, that shows what the black film can be when creative talents are given an opportunity free of the strong sex and violence requirements of the exploitation formulae."

Jacqueline Trescott of The Washington Post was not so impressed, calling the film's nostalgia "deja vu and hackneyed, antiseptic even." She found several comic scenes to be "[w]ell-executed ... But these passages still lack a distinctive look and enough fire to raise 'Cooley' above the mediocre mark." Reviewing Cooley High for The Monthly Film Bulletin in 1977, Jonathan Rosenbaum said that "Michael Schultz's first feature can be viewed with hindsight as the promising debut of a very talented director, intermittently doing what he can with an uneven and somewhat routine script."

The film holds an 83% rating on Rotten Tomatoes based on reviews from 53 critics. The consensus summarizes: "Cooley High crackles with vibrant energy and authenticity, elevated by an impressively natural cast and Michael Schultz's effortless direction." Filmmaker Spike Lee included the film on his essential film list entitled List of Films All Aspiring Filmmakers Must See. The movie also ranked #23 on Entertainment Weekly's list of the 50 Best High School Movies. Metacritic gave the film a score of 72 based in 8 reviews, indicating "generally favorable" reviews.

== Television adaptation ==
ABC planned a television adaptation of Cooley High, but the pilot was poorly received, and Fred Silverman, the head of the network, asked the pilot's producers, TOY Productions, to redo the show as a sitcom with new characters and with a new title so as not to confuse it with Monte's film Cooley High. New writers were hired, cast changes made, and a switch from one-camera to three-camera filming delivered What's Happening!! to the network, where it ran from August 5, 1976, to April 28, 1979. The show and the production company were then purchased by Columbia Pictures Television in 1979 and ran in syndication for a number of years.

== Home media release and possible remake ==
Released on VHS in 1991 and 1994 by Orion Home Video

In 2000, Cooley High was released on DVD. The Criterion Collection released the film on Blu-ray on December 13, 2022.

On July 19, 2016, it was reported that MGM was developing a remake of 1975 film Cooley High, with DeVon Franklin, Common and Tony Krantz. Seth Rosenfeld would write the screenplay.

== See also ==
- List of American films of 1975
- What's Happening Now!!
- List of hood films
