= Eric Monte =

American screenwriter (born 1943)

- Born: Kenneth Williams; December 25, 1943 (age 82); Chicago, Illinois, U.S.
- Education: Cooley Vocational High School (attended)
- Occupation: Screenwriter
- Years active: 1970–2001
- Known for: Writer – Good Times, What's Happening!!, The Jeffersons, Cooley High

Eric Monte (born Kenneth Williams; December 25, 1943) is a retired American screenwriter and TV series creator. He is known for his work in depicting 1970s African-American culture. Monte wrote and created several sitcoms for television such as Good Times (with actor and screenwriter Mike Evans), The Jeffersons as a writer, What's Happening!!, and its spin-off series, What's Happening Now!!. The series was based on the coming of age film Cooley High, which Monte wrote and which was based on his high school experiences.

== Early life ==
Born Kenneth Williams, he was the middle of three children to Ilene in Chicago, Illinois. Monte was raised in the Cabrini–Green housing project on the near-north side. During his junior year, he dropped out of Cooley Vocational High School and enlisted in the United States Army. Soon after his stint in the army, Monte hitchhiked on Route 66 eventually landing in Hollywood after stops in Arizona and Las Vegas.

== Career ==
His first big break came five years later, with a script written for and accepted by All in the Family, which eventually contributed to the spawning of The Jeffersons. From there, he produced two 1970s sitcoms: Good Times (which he co-created with The Jeffersons star Mike Evans) and What's Happening!! (which was based on his screenplay for the 1975 motion picture Cooley High). (Cooley High also inspired the CBS television show The White Shadow (November 27, 1978 to March 16, 1981), starring Ken Howard.)

According to the Los Angeles Times, in 1977 he filed a lawsuit accusing CBS, Tandem Productions, producers Norman Lear and Jerry Perenchio, and others of stealing his ideas for Good Times, The Jeffersons (an All in the Family spinoff), and What's Happening!! Eventually, he says, he received a $1-million settlement and a small percentage of the residuals from Good Times, but opportunities to pitch new scripts dried up after the lawsuit. Since Good Times ended, the only scripts he's written that have been produced by Hollywood are single episodes of The Wayans Bros. and of Moesha, the latter of which Monte has called "the absolute worst script I've ever written". He took part of the settlement money to finance the production of a play he had written, titled If They Come Back. The play was a commercial failure, and significantly contributed to Monte's financial ruin.

== Personal life ==
After falling on hard times, by 2003, his drinking had worsened, and he had developed an addiction to crack cocaine. He later declared bankruptcy, and by 2006, he was living in a Salvation Army homeless shelter in Bell, California. He appeared to maintain sobriety there as the shelter required regular drug tests, and he pursued attempts to sell television and film scripts as well as a self-published book called Blueprint for Peace. Later in 2006, Monte moved back to Chicago.

Monte now lives in Portland, Oregon.
