= Cabrini–Green, Chicago =

- Neighborhood
- Interactive map of Cabrini–Green, Chicago
- Coordinates: 41°54′05″N 87°38′28″W
- Country: United States
- City: Chicago, Illinois
- Community areas: Near North Side, Chicago
- First settled: 1942

Cabrini–Green is a neighborhood on the Near North Side of Chicago named after the Cabrini–Green Homes public housing project. Most of the public housing buildings were demolished in the years 1995-2011, and only the two-story rowhouses remain from the original project. The area is adjacent to Old Town to the north, Gold Coast to the east, River North to the south, and Goose Island to the west.

The Cabrini–Green neighborhood is being redeveloped into a combination of mid-rise buildings and row houses to create a mixed-income neighborhood with some units reserved for public housing tenants.

Parks in the neighborhood include Seward Park and Durso Park.

Jenner is the pre-K through grade 8 school in the neighborhood.

Present residential structures include Frances Cabrini Rowhouses (1942), Parkside of Old Town (2011), and The Larrabee.

The area is bordered by Larrabee Street to the west, Orleans or Sedgwick Street to the east, Evergreen Ave to the north and Chicago Avenue to the south.
