= Chicago Teachers College =

Coordinates: 41.9812°N 87.7174°W

Chicago Teachers College was established in 1867 as the first teacher training school, or normal school, in Cook County, Illinois. It was originally the Cook County Normal School, which merged with the Chicago Teachers' Training School. It became the Chicago Normal School in 1896 and the Chicago Teachers College in 1938. It separated into two campuses in 1949. In 1965, the north campus became Northeastern Illinois State College and the south campus became the Chicago State College.
