= Catherine Goggin =

American educator

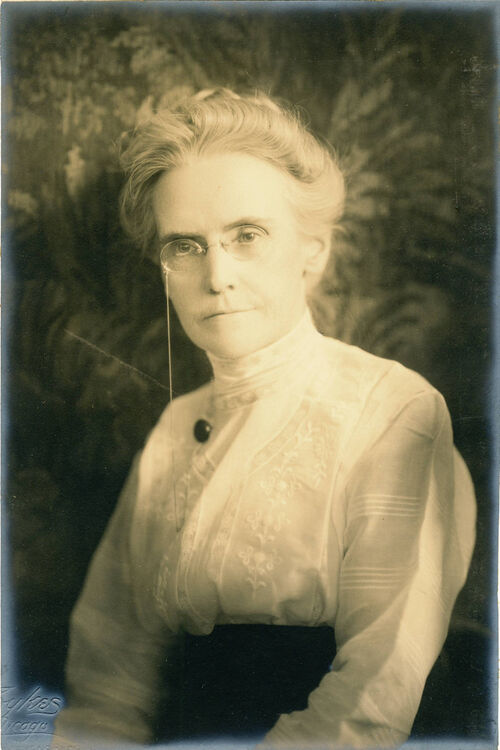
- Born: 1855; Adirondack, New York, U.S.
- Died: January 4, 1916 (aged 60–61); Chicago, Illinois, U.S.
- Occupations: Educator, suffragist, union leader

Catherine Goggin (1855 – January 4, 1916) was an American educator, suffragist, and teachers' union leader; she co-founded the Chicago Teachers' Federation with Margaret Haley.

== Early life and education ==
Goggin was born in Adirondack, New York, and raised in Chicago, the daughter of Irish Catholic immigrants. She graduated from Chicago Central High School in 1872, with a teaching certificate.

== Career ==
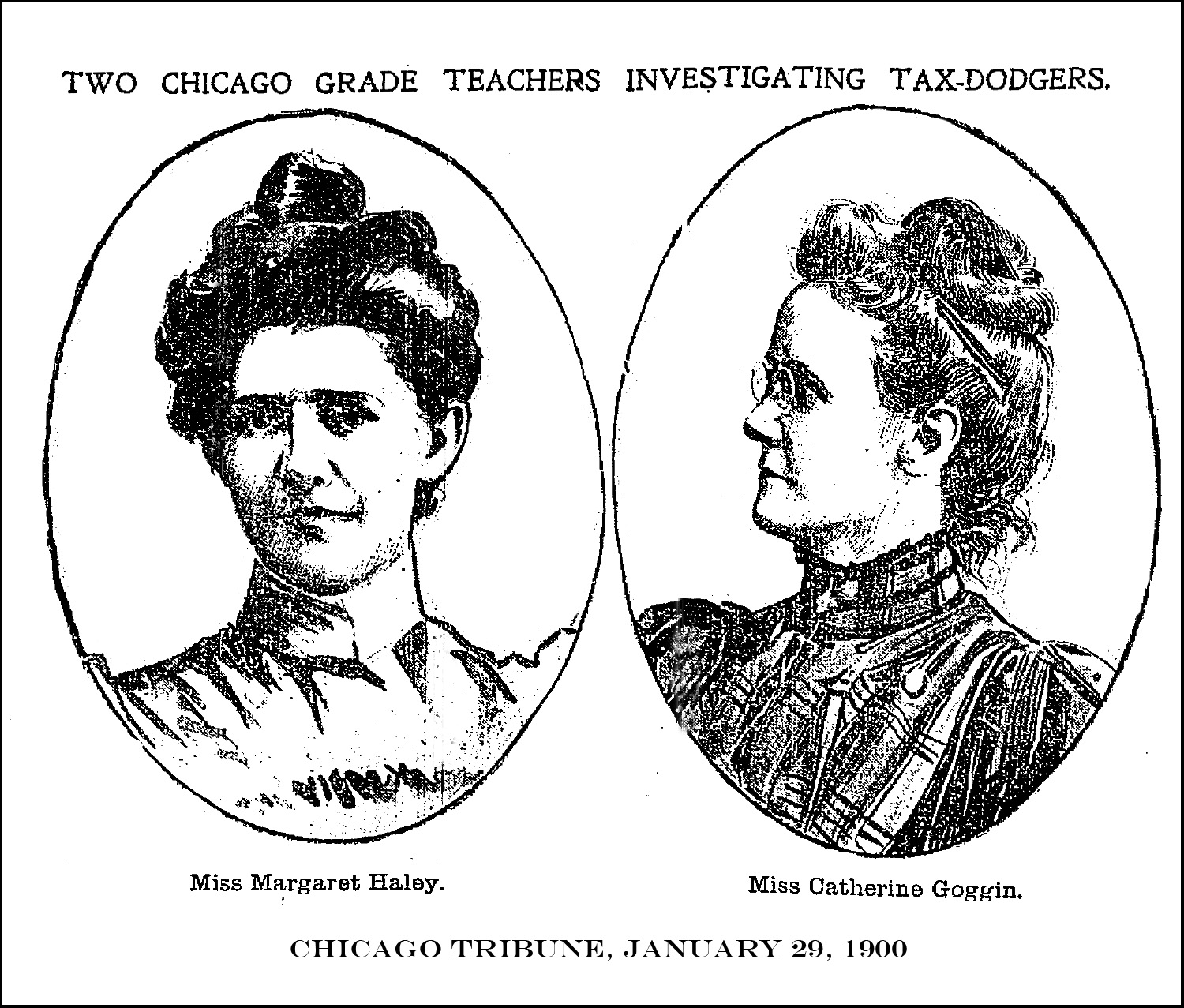
Margaret Haley and Catherine Goggin, from a 1900 newspaper illustration

Goggin taught school in Chicago from her teens. She became active in teachers' union work in 1895, when she lobbied for a state bill supporting teachers' pensions. She was elected president of Chicago's Grade Teachers' Federation in 1899, defeating Elizabeth Burdick.

Goggin and Margaret Haley co-founded the Chicago Teachers' Federation in 1897, and Goggin was the union's president, financial secretary, and "little general". Goggin and Haley sued the state of Illinois, with Clarence Darrow's legal assistance, to demand that corporations based in Chicago be taxed sufficiently to ensure that Chicago teachers would be paid. Goggin worked for equal pay for women teachers, and against mandatory college degrees for teachers. The Chicago Teachers' Federation became part of the American Federation of Labor in 1902.

Goggin was an officer of the Catholic Women's League, worked with the Chicago Federation of Labor, and active in the women's suffrage movement in Illinois. In 1904 she won a prize (a blue ribbon and a gold thimble) for her expert darning skills.

== Personal life ==
Goggin's health was not strong and her illnesses were attributed to overwork. She died in 1916 after she was struck by a truck in Chicago, at the age of 60. Former Chicago schools superintendent Ella Flagg Young paid tribute, saying "The teachers of Chicago have lost a friend whose devotion to secure their rights was fearless."
