= Clinton Bristow Jr. =

American lawyer and academic (1949–2006)

16th President of Alcorn State University
- In office August 24, 1995–August 19, 2006
- Preceded by: Rudolph E. Waters Sr. (interim)
- Succeeded by: Malvin A. Williams Sr. (interim)

President of the Chicago Board of Education
- In office 1990–1992
- Preceded by: Frank Gardner; James Compton (interim)
- Succeeded by: Florence Cox

Personal details
- Died: August 19, 2006
- Education: Northwestern University (B.A., J.D., Ph.D.); Governors State University (MBA)
- Occupation: Lawyer, academic official

Clinton Bristow Jr. (1949 – August 19, 2006) was an American lawyer, academic official, and who served as the president of the Chicago Board of Education and as the sixteenth president of Alcorn State University.

== Early life and education ==
Bristow was born in 1949 in Montgomery, Alabama

Bristow graduated from East Tech high school in 1967 as class valedictorian. At East Tech he had served as class president, and been a letterman in football.

Bristow graduated from Northwestern University in 1971 with a Bachelor of Arts. In 1974, he received his juris doctor from Northwestern, and in 1977 he received a Ph.D. in education administration and public administration from Northwestern. In 1984, he received his MBA from Governors State University.

== Career ==
In October 1990, the Chicago Board of Education elected Bristow as its president. He served until 1992.

A native of Alabama, Bristow was installed as Alcorn's president on August 24, 1995. Under his leadership, the number of students in Alcorn's graduate and professional programs grew by a large percentage. An increase in the number of international students attending Alcorn during Bristow's administration gained national attention. Bristow also served as president of the Southwestern Athletic Conference.

== Personal life ==
Bristow died of heart failure on August 19, 2006, just two days before the start of Alcorn's fall 2006 semester. He was known to be an avid runner, and was found dead on the campus track. He was 57.
