= Edward Jenner School =

Location
- 1119 North Cleveland Avenue; Chicago, Illinois 60610; United States; 41.9021258°N 87.64083069999998°W

Information
- School type: Public; Elementary; Middle
- Opened: 1944; September 2018 (Ogden International-Jenner)
- Closed: June 2018 (Jenner School)
- School district: Chicago Public Schools
- Principal: David Domovic (Ogden International; acting)
- Staff: Dr. Kimberly Watson (Head; Ogden International-Jenner) (Head; Ogden International-Jenner)
- Grades: Pre-K–8 (Jenner School); Pre-K; 5–8 (Ogden International-Jenner)
- Gender: Coed
- Enrollment: 1,262 (2018–2019)
- Campus type: Urban
- Colors: Green; Gray
- Mascot: Owls
- Website: ogden.cps.edu/jenner-campus-5-8--prek.html

Edward Jenner School, also known as Edward Jenner Elementary Academy of the Arts, was a public PK-8 school located in the Cabrini-Green area of the Near North Side, Chicago, Illinois, United States. Named after Edward Jenner, The school was opened and operated by the Chicago Public Schools (CPS). Jenner merged with Ogden International School in September 2018. The campus is now Ogden International–Jenner which serves grades Pre–K, 5th through 8th.

== Background ==
=== Student body, performance, and culture ===
In January 1966 the school had 2,539 students. In August 1966 Jenner, with 2,523 students, almost all of them African-American, was the largest elementary school in Chicago. At that time it had 80 teachers.

In 2016, 98% of the 239 students at Jenner were African-American; almost all lived in low-income households. All but two of the students were black and about 33% were homeless in 2013. As of that year, some students lived in newer housing developments that accepted former residents of Cabrini-Green while others lived in the remaining Cabrini-Green row-houses. Before the City of Chicago installed a Lighthouse academic program for low-performing students around the year 2000, 15% of Jenner students met the national average in performance in mathematics, and 14% did so in reading. After the program was installed, these assessments jumped to 29% and 21%.

Jenner teacher Mathias J. Schergen stated that, as in Cabrini-Green itself, students at Jenner were bound to one another through extended familial and "godcousin" relationships and that the school and wider area had a symbiotic relationship. Schergen, who gave himself the nickname "Mr. Spider" when he began teaching at Jenner in 1993, taught art at the school for 22 years, retiring in 2015. By 2000, Schergen had turned a classroom in the former Jenner building, about to be replaced by the current building, into a museum. Later, he received a Gold Apple Award for his teaching.

== History ==
Edward Jenner School opened in 1944 with a majority student body made up of Italian migrants.

=== 1966 boycott and principal transfer ===
In January and April 1966, African-American parents boycotted the school in order to remove the white principal, Mildred Chuchut of Jenner. In February 1966 parents also protested outside the school. In January, of the students, only about 417 showed up. The NAACP advocated for removing Chuchut from her position. A group of teachers criticized her management style.

Chuchut asked to be sent to a different school, citing her health. Chicago Public Schools transferred her to Stowe Elementary School on August 10, 1966. It was one of several conflicts in the schools where parents wanted white principals of majority minority schools to be replaced.

=== Dantrell Davis, Cabrini–Green and violence ===
Don Terry of The New York Times wrote that the school's atmosphere deteriorated after the October 13, 1992 shooting death of Jenner student Dantrell Davis, age 7. Davis was walking to school when he died. From March to October of that year, three students, including Davis, were fatally shot within blocks of Jenner. The school had 570 students during the 1997–1998 school year. That year the playground was in such a poor condition that children could not use it, and violent acts occurred in the vicinity of the school. In 1997, the chief executive officer of the school district, Paul Vallas, stated that he may move students from the school building to another temporary location for safety reasons; 7th and 8th grade students had witnessed a fatal shooting in September of that year.

=== Enrollment decline and new campus ===
In August 1966, the school had 2,523 students. At that time, it was Chicago's largest elementary school. During the 1970–1971 school year, Jenner had 1,920 students. 25 years later, during the 1996–1997 school year the school had 625 students. Jenner's current campus opened in 2000. At the time of its new campus opening, Enrollment had declined due to the rapid demolition of the Cabrini-Green public housing complex where majority of its student population resided. The campus occupies the block that held the previous campus. The building has 29 classrooms, a gymnasium, a science laboratory, a math lab, art rooms, and music rooms. Its building capacity is 1,060.

=== Merges with Byrd and Schiller schools ===
Jenner's attendance boundary extended due to the closing of another grade school located within Cabrini-Green, Byrd Elementary School, in 2004. The school later received students from another Cabrini-area school, Schiller Elementary School when it closed in 2009. Incidents of violence at the school increased after merges with Byrd and Schiller schools due to placements of rival gang members together.

In 2007, the Jenner had about 600 students, and about 33% of students passed mathematics, readings, and science standardized tests administered by the state of Illinois. That year Steven Drummond of Education Week stated that while Jenner was still surrounded by poverty, violence "is not as prevalent as it once was". Mina Bloom of DNA Info wrote that Jenner had improved safety-wise since the appointment of principal Robert Croston, who received his degree from Harvard University. In 2015, Maureen Kelleher of Catalyst Chicago, a sister publication of the Chicago Reporter, stated that "safety has become less of a concern" due to gentrification of the area.

=== Proposed merger with Manierre, later enrollment and merger into Ogden ===
During the 2012–2013 school year, the school had 329 students. That year, CPS considered closing Jenner, but instead decided to close Manierre School and merge its student population into that of Jenner. Manierre is in "Sedville", a gang territory area in Old Town. Concerns involving students crossing gang territorial lines meant that both schools remained open.

In 2015, Robert Croston, the principal of Jenner, and the principal of Ogden International School, a K–12 institution with an elementary campus in the Gold Coast and a secondary campus in West Town, proposed merging their schools; Ogden was overcrowded while Jenner was under-enrollment and was threatened with closure. Some parents approved of the merger, while others opposed it. At first the merger proposal was canceled as there was not enough time left to get it accomplished for the 2015–2016 school year, and aside from the opposition of some parents, the CPS had what David Matthews of DNA Info referred to as "lukewarm support". CPS head Janice Jackson had stated that there was not enough "due diligence" done in order for the merger to go through.

The enrollment at Jenner was 239 by 2016 and considered by the district extremely under-enrolled. In August of that year the discussions on how to merge the schools resumed, and in December of that year CPS confirmed that the process of merging the schools would begin. The CPS board voted unanimously for the merger in February 2018, and the merger took place in September 2018.

== Feeder patterns ==
Students zoned to Jenner for K-8 were zoned to either Wells Community Academy High School or Lincoln Park High School for senior high.
