= Jacob Loeb =

American businessman (1876/77–1944)

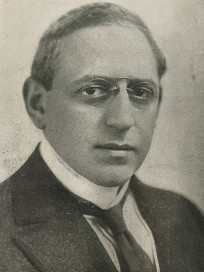

President of the Chicago Board of Education
- In office December 1915 – June 18, 1917
- Preceded by: Michael J. Collins
- Succeeded by: Edwin S. Davis

Personal details
- Died: February 17, 1944 (age 68); Chicago, Illinois

Jacob M. Loeb was an American businessman who founded the Eliel & Loeb insurance company, and served as the president of the Chicago Board of Education. He was a public representative of his extended family during a high-profile murder trial of his nephew Richard Albert Loeb. He was also prominently involved in Jewish civic causes.

== Private sector career ==
Loeb served as the president and the chairman of the Eliel & Loeb insurance agency. He founded the company in 1901 with Herman J. Eliel. He retired as president in 1940 in order to assume the role of chairman. One of his sons, Hamilton M. Loeb, succeeded him in the office of president.

Loeb was also involved in real estate.

== Chicago Board of Education ==
Loeb served as a board member of the Chicago Board of Education, serving as its president from 1915 until his ouster in 1917.

=== Loeb Rule ===
As a board member, in September 1915, Loeb led the passage of the so-called "Loeb Rule", which declared that any teacher that was a member of a trade union or any other unauthorized society would not be hired by the Chicago Board of Education to work in Chicago Public Schools. Litigation launched by the Chicago Teachers Federation against the Chicago Board of Education regarding the rule was fought in many courts. In April 1917, the Supreme Court of Illinois upheld the rule.

=== Presidency of the board ===
In December 1915, Loeb was elected by a vote of the members of the Chicago Board of Education to serve as the board's president. The board reelected him as president for another year in December 1916, with Loeb receiving twelve votes in support of his reelection.

Early in his presidency, Loeb altered the procurement of all fire insurance for school buildings, opening it up to bidding.

In a 1917 exposé, The Day Book, accused Loeb's fire insurance company of connecting him with merchants and manufacturers belonging to the Illinois Manufacturers' Association, which had been hostile to the Chicago Teachers Federation.

On May 31, 1917, the Chicago City Council voted 42–24 to confirm the appointment by Mayor William Hale Thompson of Loeb to an additional five-year term on the Chicago Board of Education. This was seen was a rebuke to Margaret Haley and her Chicago Teachers Federation's attempt to see a more union-friendly board appointed. The city's largest unions all lined in opposition to the confirmation of Loeb's reappointment, even the United Hebrew Trades chapter (who acknowledged in their statement of opposition that Loeb was a fellow Jew). Loeb had been renominated by the Republican mayor despite being a Democrat himself.

On May 22, 1917, Loeb accused Thompson and Frederick Lundin of attempting to extend their political influence to the school system. On June 18, 1917, the Chicago Board of Education voted to oust Loeb as president. The school board's attorney disagreed with this action, and Loeb This was orchestrated by Mayor Thompson and his allies on the board. Mayor Thompson also orchestrated the removal of two other individuals from their positions on the Chicago Board of Education, removing Lewis Larson as secretary of the board and Angus Roy Shannon as the board's lawyer. Loeb soon blamed his ouster on the political machine headed by Thompson and Lundin, and asserted that his ouster proved his accusations made the month prior. This ouster did not come without controversy. On June 22, Cook County State's Attorney Maclay Hoyne argued that these removals had been illegal and that Loeb was still school board president. On June 22, 1917, the Chicago City Council voted to refused to recognize the appointment of new school board officers selected by Mayor Thompson. They instead voted to reinstate Loeb and the two other removed officers of the school board. The mayor had attempted had adjourn the meeting before the vote, and left the meeting, but Alderman John A. Richert presided in his absence. The City Council saw a resolutions proposed at the meeting request the mayor's resignation, and another to launch an impeachment inquiry (despite there being no mechanism for the Chicago City Council to impeach a mayor). The mayor attempted to fight the reinstatement of the three school board members, having fifty policemen guard the Chicago Board of Education's offices to keep the three out. State's Attorney Hoyne launched an investigation to determine whether or not Mayor Thompson was guilty of malfeasance in office for failing to recognize the rights of the City Council.

Loeb was not restored to the office of board president

=== Later tenure ===
Loeb continued to serve on the board.

== Civic involvement ==
Loeb was president of Chicago's esteemed Standard Club from 1925 through 1928.

A Jew himself, Loeb was a booster for the Jewish people, particularly in the city of Chicago. For 22 years, until retiring in 1933, Loeb was president of the organization initially known as the Chicago Hebrew Institute and later renamed the Jewish People's Institute. He served as honorary president for years afterwards. In 1922, at a Jewish Relief dinner held at New York City's Commodore Hotel, Loeb attracted attention for castigating New York Jews for what he alleged was apathy towards the persecution of Eastern European Jews and a failure in their duty to help European Jews. Rabbi Stephen Samuel Wise later spoke in agreement with Loeb's remarks.

== Involvement in the "trial of the century" ==
Loeb's nephew Richard Albert Loeb, the son of his brother Albert Loeb, became one half of the murderous duo known as "Leopold and Loeb", whose 1924 murder trial was often dubbed the "trial of the century". Loeb's brother Albert had a heart attack a few days before his son had murdered Bobby Franks and remained in poor health during the trial. To aid in his recovery, Albert Loeb retired to his family's Charlevoix estate and remained there in seclusion during the period of the trial. In Albert Loeb's absence, Jacob Loeb and Allan Loeb (the eldest son of Albert Loeb) served as the public representatives of their family during the trial, attending the court hearings and acting as liaisons between attorney Clarence Darrow and other involved parties. Loeb took the stand himself in an effort to help save his nephew from receiving capital punishment.

== Personal life and family ==
Loeb was Jewish.

Loeb was the brother of attorney and businessman Albert Henry Loeb, whose son was the murderer Richard Albert Loeb. Loeb was also the brother of Sydney Loeb.

Loeb was the father of the composer John Jacob Loeb.

== Death ==
Loeb died at the age of 68 on February 17, 1944, in his unit of the Parkshore Apartments in Chicago.
