= Walter Newberry =

Walter Newberry may refer to:

- Walter C. Newberry (1835–1912), U.S. Representative from Illinois
- Walter Loomis Newberry (1804–1868), American businessman and philanthropist
