= Ogden High School (disambiguation) =

Ogden High School is a school in Ogden, Utah.

Ogden High School may also refer to:

- The high school division of Ogden International School in Chicago
- Ogden High School in Ogden, Iowa
- St. Joseph-Ogden High School in St. Joseph, Illinois
