= Harriet Taylor =

Harriet Taylor may refer to:

- Harriet Taylor Mill, British philosopher and women's rights advocate
- Harriet Taylor, (1831-1887), one of the aliases of British sailor Happy Ned who participated in the American Civil War
- Harriet Taylor (rower), British rower
- Harriet Taylor Upton, American political activist and author
- Harriet Taylor Treadwell, American suffragist and educator
