= French-American School of Chicago =

French international school in Chicago, USA

Coordinates: 41°55′27.6″N 87°38′42.0″W

- (French: École Franco-Américaine de Chicago
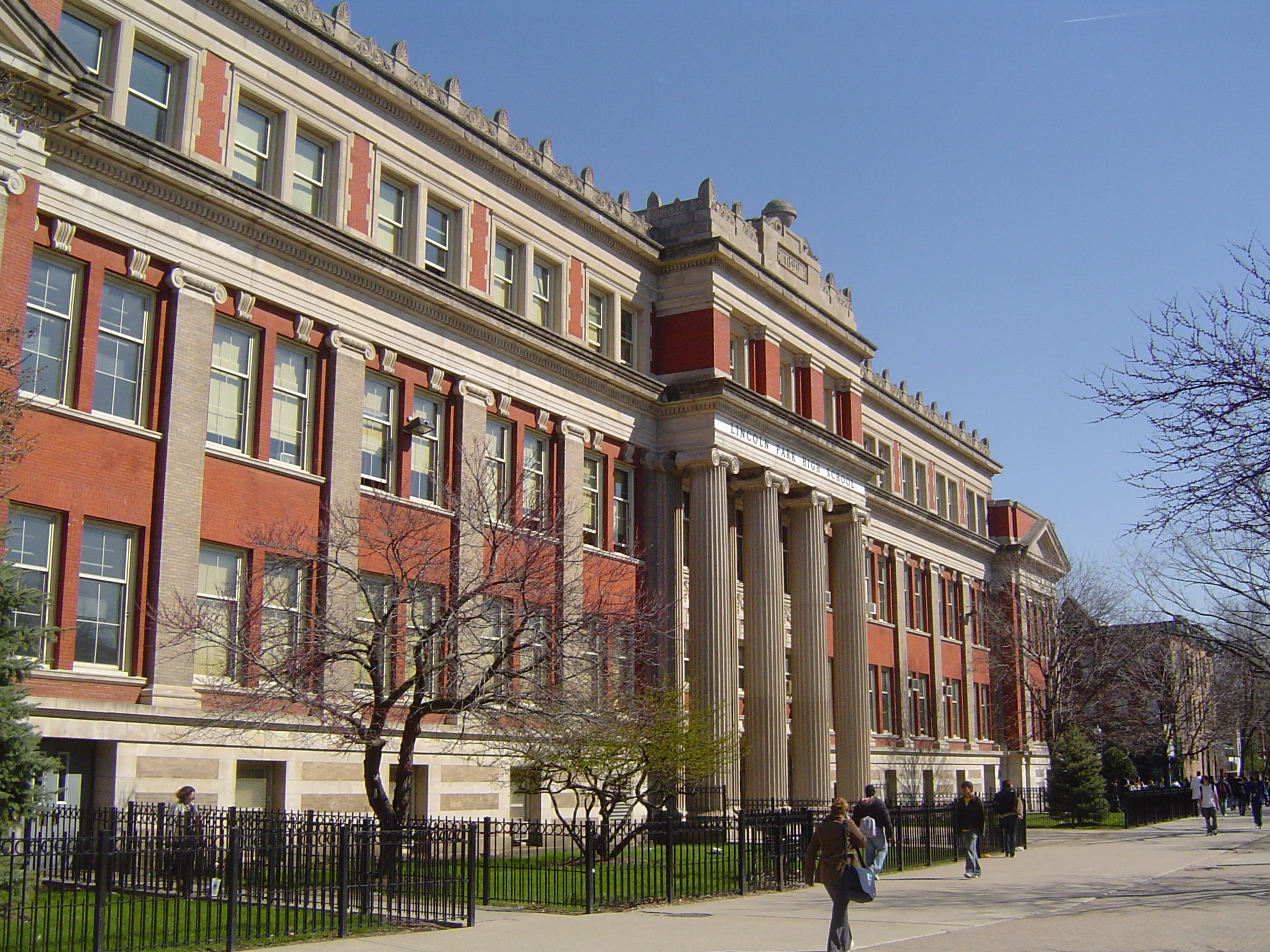
- Lincoln Park High School, the location of high school classes
- Lincoln Park, Chicago, Illinois; United States

Information
- Established: 1981

The French-American School of Chicago (French: École Franco-Américaine de Chicago, EFAC) is a French international school in Lincoln Park, Chicago, Illinois. Elementary and junior high school classes are held at Abraham Lincoln Elementary School while senior high school classes are held at Lincoln Park High School. The school first opened in 1981 and high school classes began in 1995.

Students in the high school division may live in any place in the city of Chicago, but only persons living in the Abraham Lincoln Elementary boundary may attend the elementary and middle school program.

== See also ==
American schools in France:

- American School of Paris - An American international school in France
- American School of Grenoble
