= John Clark Dore =

American politician and educator (1822–1900)

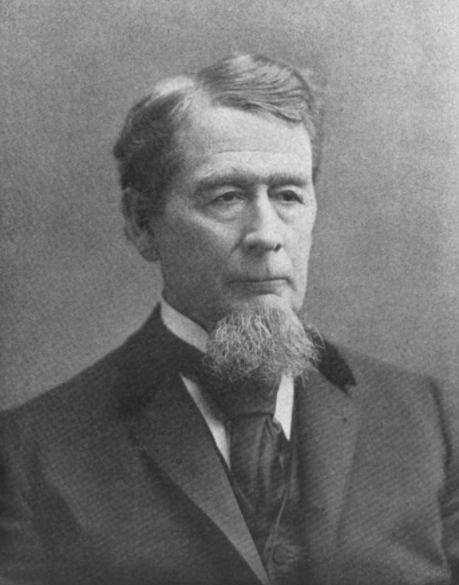

Member of the Illinois Senate from the 24th district
- In office 1868 – 1872
- Preceded by: Francis A. Eastman
- Succeeded by: state senate reapportioned after the adoption of the 1870 constitution

President of the Chicago Board of Education
- In office 1860–1861
- Preceded by: Luther Haven
- Succeeded by: John H. Foster

1st Superintendent of Chicago Public Schools
- In office June 1854 – March 15, 1856
- Preceded by: Office established
- Succeeded by: William H. Wells

Personal details
- Born: March 22, 1822 Ossipee, New Hampshire, U.S.
- Died: December 14, 1900 (aged 78) Boston, Massachusetts, U.S.
- Party: Republican
- Profession: Educator, businessman

John Clark Dore (March 22, 1822 – December 14, 1900) was an American educator and politician from New Hampshire. A graduate of Dartmouth College, Dore briefly taught in Boston, Massachusetts before he was recruited to come to Chicago, Illinois to serve as its first superintendent of school. Dore was also a successful merchant, serving as the vice president of the Chicago Board of Trade. He was elected to the Illinois Senate in 1868, where he helped to establish the Illinois Humane Society.

== Early life and early career ==
John Clark Dore was born in Ossipee, New Hampshire, on March 22, 1822. He was first authorized to teach when he was seventeen. He matriculated at Dartmouth College when he was twenty-one, graduating in 1847. Dore was then named an assistant teacher in a public school in Boston, Massachusetts. He was first taught, and was later made school principal of the Boylston School, and attracted the attention of educators in Chicago, Illinois.

== Superintendent of Chicago Public Schools ==
On March 6, 1854, the Chicago school board voted Dore as its first superintendent of public schools. The board's first choice, John D. Philbrick, had previously declined. He officially entered office in June 1854. At the time he took office, Chicago's school system lacked organization, and the sole power the superintendent had was the power that the school board gave him. Dore brought many reforms, but his ability to introduce sufficient reform was limited because schools were largely under the purview of the Chicago Common Council. He introduced examinations to re-classify students and determine promotions, he organized departments, instituted in uniformity of textbooks, and had instituted official the keeping of class registers and attendance records. He resigned on March 15, 1856. When he left, school enrollment had doubled to more than 6,100, 46 new instructors had been hired, and four new schools (including a high school) had been constructed.

== Chicago Board of Education and Chicago Board of Trade ==
He had resigned as superintendent so that he could pursue a business opportunity and was soon elected a member of the Chicago Board of Education (its newly-renamed school board). From 1860 to February 1861 he served as president of the Chicago Board of Education. At the same time, he was succeeding in his business affairs. He was named vice president of the Chicago Board of Trade in 1866.

== Illinois Senate ==
He was elected to the Illinois Senate in 1868 as a Republican, serving for four years. He represented the South and Northern parts of Chicago, and several outlying towns. He unsuccessfully opposed the Lake-Front Bill of 1869, through which the State of Illinois gave the land rights of the outer harbor of the city of Chicago to the Illinois Central Railroad Company. He was chairman of the Committee of the State Senate on Internal Improvements, and framed the bill which made the first appropriation to improve the navigability of the Illinois River by constructing a lock and dam at Henry, Illinois. He also authored laws regarding the humane treatment of children and animals.

== Subsequent career ==
Dore would serve as president and director of the Illinois Humane Society for several years.

He assumed the presidency of the Commercial Insurance Company, then was named president of the Chicago Board of Underwriters in 1869. Following the Great Chicago Fire of 1871, he was named the president of the State Savings Institution, resigning in 1873. Dore also presided over the Newsboys' and Bootblacks' Home and donated a building to them in 1884.

== Personal life and death ==
Dore married Annie B. Moulton on January 1, 1850. Their only son died in infancy. In his last years, he resided in Boston. He died at the Hotel Vendome in Boston on December 14, 1900, and was buried in the Herman Dore Farm Cemetery in Ossipee. The John C. Dore Elementary School in Chicago today bears his name.

== See also ==
- History of education in Chicago
