= Richard J. Hamilton =

American politician

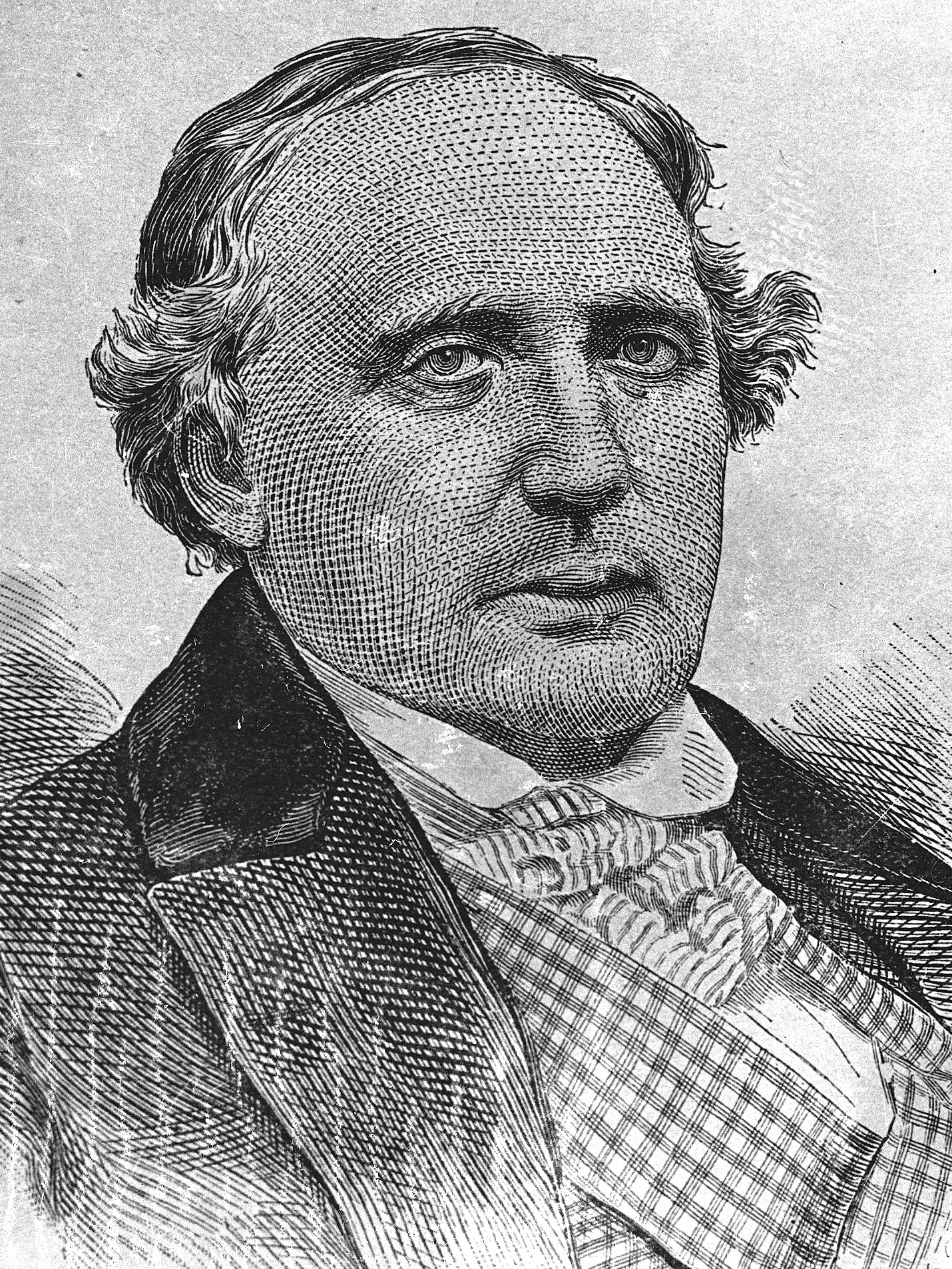

Member of the Chicago Common Council
- In office 1849–1851 Serving with Samuel McKay (1849–50) and F.C. Hageman (1849–51)
- Preceded by: Samuel McKay
- Succeeded by: Walter Loomis Newberry
- Constituency: 9th ward
- In office 1840–1841 Serving with William B. Ogden
- Preceded by: John H. Kinzie
- Succeeded by: George F. Foster
- Constituency: 6th ward

2nd Cook County Clerk
- In office December 1831 – August 1837
- Appointed by: Cook County Board of Commissioners
- Preceded by: William Lee
- Succeeded by: George Davis

1st Cook County Recorder
- In office 1831–1839
- Preceded by: office established
- Succeeded by: Eli R. Williams

1st Probate Judge of Cook County
- In office February 1831 – September 1835
- Appointed by: Illinois General Assembly
- Preceded by: office established
- Succeeded by: Issac Harmon

1st Clerk of the Circuit Court of Cook County
- In office 1831–1841
- Preceded by: office established
- Succeeded by: H. G. Hubbard

Justice of the Peace of Jackson County, Illinois
- In office 1826–1831
- Appointed by: Illinois General Assembly

Personal details
- Born: August 21, 1799 Mercer County, Kentucky
- Died: December 26, 1860 (aged 61) Chicago, Illinois
- Party: Democratic
- Spouse(s): Diana W. Buckner (m. 1822; death 1834) Harriette L. Hubbard (m. 1835; death 1842) Priscilla P. Tuley (m. 1843)
- Education: Shelbyville College
- Occupation: Judge, politician, lawyer, clerk

Richard Jones Hamilton (August 21, 1799 – December 12, 1860) was an American politician and judge. Hamilton was born in Kentucky, but moved to Illinois in his early adulthood where he held numerous public offices. Hamilton was a member of the Democratic Party. In the 1830s, Hamilton moved to Cook County, Illinois, where he served as a county judge, the recorder of deeds, county clerk, clerk of the Circuit Court, clerk of the Cook County Commissions Court, and also held several minor municipal offices in Chicago. In the 1840s, Hamilton twice won election to the Chicago Common Council (city council) as a Democrat. He was a Democratic presidential elector in 1852, and was the Democratic Party's unsuccessful nominee for lieutenant governor of Illinois in 1856

== Early life and career ==
Hamilton was born August 21, 1799, in Mercer County, Kentucky. He was educated at Shelbyville Academy and Shelbyville College.

At the age of seventeen, Hamilton took a job as a shop clerk. In 1818, he moved to Louisville, Kentucky. In 1820, he left Kentucky for Illinois, moving to Jonesboro. In Jonesboro, he initially worked as a teacher. However, he left this job in 1821 after being appointed a cashier at the newly established Illinois State Bank.

== Politics and government ==
In 1826, Hamilton was appointed a justice of the peace for Jackson County by the Illinois General Assembly. In 1827, he was admitted to the bar after studying law. In 1829, Hamilton practiced law throughout Illinois' southern circuit.

In 1831, Hamilton lost his employment as a state bank cashier following the bank's closure. Soon after, the state legislature appointed him in February to serve as the inaugural probate judge of newly created Cook County, Illinois. He held the judgeship until late-1835. That year, he was also made the inaugural Cook County recorder, holding that office from 1831 until 1839. In 1831, he also was made the inaugural clerk of the Circuit Court of Cook County, holding that office until 1841. J. Young Scammon served as his deputy clerk of the from 1835 through 1836 (taking this role after the previous deputy clerk, Henry Moore, could not continue in it). In December 1831, he was appointed clerk of Cook County, an office that he held until August 1837. In 1832, Hamilton also became clerk of the Cook County Commissions Court, holding that office until 1837. He also held several minor offices in the city of Chicago at this time.

In 1840, Hamilton won election to the Chicago Common Council (city council) as a Democrat. In 1849, Hamilton was elected to a non-consecutive second term on the Common Council.

Hamilton was a Democratic presidential elector in the 1852 presidential election.

In 1856, Hamilton was the unsuccessful Democratic nominee for lieutenant governor of Illinois.

Hamilton was a supporter of the temperance movement, and many progressive movements.

== Personal life ==
In 1822, Hamilton married Diana W. Buckner. He became widowed after her death in 1834. In 1835, he remarried to Hariette L. Hubbard. He was widowed a second time after she died in 1843. In 1843, he married his third wife Priscilla P. Tuley.

Hamilton was a Freemason, and served as an officer of the Grand Lodge Of Illinois. He was also a Presbyterian.

Hamilton died in Chicago on December 26, 1860. He was buried with Masonic honors.
