= Wells Community Academy High School =

Public secondary school in Chicago, Illinois, US

Wells High School

Location
- 936 N. Ashland Ave; Chicago, Illinois 60622; United States; 41.8991°N 87.6682°W

Information
- School type: Public; Secondary
- Motto: "Raiders on the RISE!"
- Opened: 1935
- School district: Chicago Public Schools
- CEEB code: 140790
- Principal: Frances E. Barnett–Evins
- Grades: 9–12
- Gender: Coed
- Enrollment: 277 (2025–2026)
- Campus type: Urban
- Colors: Royal Blue; Silver
- Athletics conference: Chicago Public League
- Team name: Raiders
- Accreditation: North Central Association of Colleges and Schools
- Yearbook: Correlator
- Website: wellshs.cps.edu

William H. Wells Community Academy High School is public 4–year high school located in the West Town neighborhood on the Near Northwest Side of Chicago, Illinois, United States. Wells is a part of the Chicago Public Schools system. Wells serves grades 9 through 12. Wells is named after former superintendent of Chicago Public Schools William H. Wells. Currently, Wells serves a large section of the inner and central areas of Chicago, with its attendance boundaries reaching as far north as Webster Avenue, as far south as 16th Street, as far east as Lake Michigan, and as far west as Sacramento Boulevard. This area includes sections of West Town, Bucktown, the Chicago Loop, the Near North Side, and the Near West Side.

== History ==
Wells was established in William Harvey Wells's honor approximately a year after his death in 1886. The current building opened in 1935 on the site of the original school with extra ground at the north. Originally, the city of Chicago planned for Wells to open as a junior high school in 1930; construction of the school was delayed. Wells enrollment was predominately white from its opening until the late 1960s. By 1972, most of the schools' population was considered low-income and majority of the African-American population were residents of the Cabrini-Green Homes public housing project. The school demographic was 71% Hispanic and 20% African-American by 1982. In 2005, Wells served as a receiving school for students zoned to Austin High School when the school board decided to phase out Austin.

=== Wells Fight Song ===
Wells High, we raise our voice to thee. Wells High, you have our loyalty, fighting and always striving, to bring to you a victory. So we'll say... Wells High, to you we pledge our hearts, to you we will be true. Fight on and keep our colors flying, silver and royal blue.

=== Demographics ===
As of the 2023–2024 school year, 53.9% of Wells's student body is Hispanic, 34.8% is African-American, 9.7% White, 0.4% Asian, and 1.1% Other. Low-income students make up 76% of Wells's student body. Wells has a 73% graduation rate.

== Small schools ==
Wells includes 2 CTE Programs:

- Law & Public Safety Academy (LPSA)
- Fine Arts Academy

The Law Academy at Wells High School has been in existence since 2003, and the program and its students have been recognized across the district in mock trial competitions. Wells began building up their Fine Arts programming in their 2019 Continuing Improvement Work Plan (CIWP). They offer programming in Music, Visual Art, Drama, and Dance.

== Other information ==
=== Principal ===
In October 2013, Rituparna Raichoudhuri was named as principal of the school, succeeding Ernesto Matias. Raichoudhuri served as resident principal during the 2012–13 school year, and previously served in the office of performance management at Chicago Public Schools, and as a teacher in California. Michael Stosek was named as principal of the school in January 2019, after Raichoudhuri's departure from the district and the placement of several interim principals. Dr. Stosek departed in the summer of 2021 and is now the principal of Ruby Thomas Elementary School in Las Vegas, Nevada. Dr. Brad Rossi was named as principal of the school at the start of the 2021-2022 school year. In his time at Wells, he has overseen the restoration of the Keith Haring mural, updates to facilities, and establishing a Memorandum of Understanding with the RE:ALIZE early college arts program housed on Wells' campus. On March 17, 2025, Dr. Rossi was not-renewed by the Local School Council, and his contract officially ended June 30, 2025.

== Athletics ==
Wells competes in the Chicago Public League (CPL) and is a member of the Illinois High School Association (IHSA). Wells sports teams are nicknamed raiders. The boys' basketball team won the public league championship in 1936–37, and they were conference champions in the 2022-2023 school year. Coach Michael Horton was awarded IHSA Coach of the year for his leadership that season. The boys' soccer team were regional champions in 2008–09, and the girls' team were regional champions in 2011–12.

== Extra-curricular activities ==
- Chess
- GSA
- Soccer
- Cheerleading
- Volleyball
- Basketball
- Baseball
- Softball
- Track & Field
- National Honor's Society (NHS)
- JROTC
- ROTC

== Feeder patterns ==
K-8 schools which feed into Wells include Andersen, Burr, Columbus, Chopin, Jenner, Lozano, Mitchell, Ogden K-8, Otis, Peabody, Pritzker, and Talcott.

== Notable alumni ==
- Jerry Butler (attended) – singer, politician
- Ramsey Lewis (1954) – Musician
- Curtis Mayfield (attended) – R&B/funk singer, songwriter
- Michael Rooker (1973) – Actor
- John DiFronzo (attended) – Philanthropist
