= Harriet Taylor Treadwell =

American suffragist

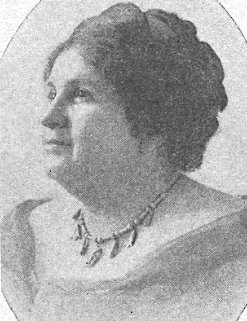
- Harriet Taylor Treadwell, from a 1916 publication.
- Born: Harriet Taylor; 1870; Williamstown, New York
- Died: December 12, 1931 (aged 60–61); Hammond, Indiana
- Other name: Harriette Taylor Treadwell
- Occupations: Educator, suffragist

Harriet Taylor Treadwell (1870 – December 12, 1931), also seen as Harriette Taylor Treadwell, was an American suffragist and educator.

== Early life ==
Harriet Taylor was born in Williamstown, New York, the daughter of Hiram Taylor and Delia C. Taylor. She trained as a teacher in New York, and earned a bachelor's degree at the University of Chicago in 1911.

== Career ==
Treadwell's career was in education. She was a schoolteacher as a young woman. She was a school principal in Chicago for many years, and president of the Chicago Teachers' Federation from 1905, succeeding Margaret Haley. In 1910, she and Margaret Free published a primer, Reading Literature. This was followed by The First Reader (1911), The Second Reader (1912), The Third Reader (1912), The Fourth Reader (1913), The Fifth Reader (1915), and The Sixth Reader (1918).

Telegram on Pankhurst Deportation, signed by Jane Addams, Harriet Taylor Treadwell, and other Chicago suffragists in 1913.

Treadwell was also active as a suffragist. She was president of the Chicago League of Women Voters, and of the Illinois Women's Legislative Congress. With Harriet Stokes Thompson and Grace Wilbur Trout, she was a leader of the Chicago Political Equality League. She spoke against the state and federal Supreme Courts, saying they were "courts of law, and not of justice." She also took an interest in prison reform. She managed circulation for a Women Voters' Special issue of the Chicago Examiner in 1913.

In November 1913, Treadwell welcomed British suffrage leader Emmeline Pankhurst at a Chicago appearance, after she was one of a group of Chicago suffragists who petitioned Woodrow Wilson to reverse the deportation of Pankhurst from the United States. In 1920, she spoke at the final meeting and victory banquet of the Illinois Equal Suffrage Association, predicting that the women's vote would bring a minimum wage, extended public school and public health measures, and pensions for mothers.

== Personal life ==
In 1897, Harriet Taylor married Dr. Charles H. Treadwell. They had a son, Charles Jr. She was widowed in 1918, and she died suddenly from a heart attack in 1931, aged 62 years, in Hammond, Indiana. Her granddaughter and namesake, Harriette Taylor Treadwell (1929-2012), was also a teacher and author, and served in the United States Air Force during the Korean War.
