= 1856 Illinois lieutenant gubernatorial election =

- November 4, 1856
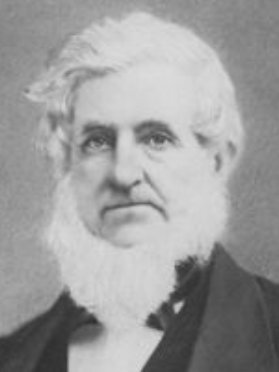

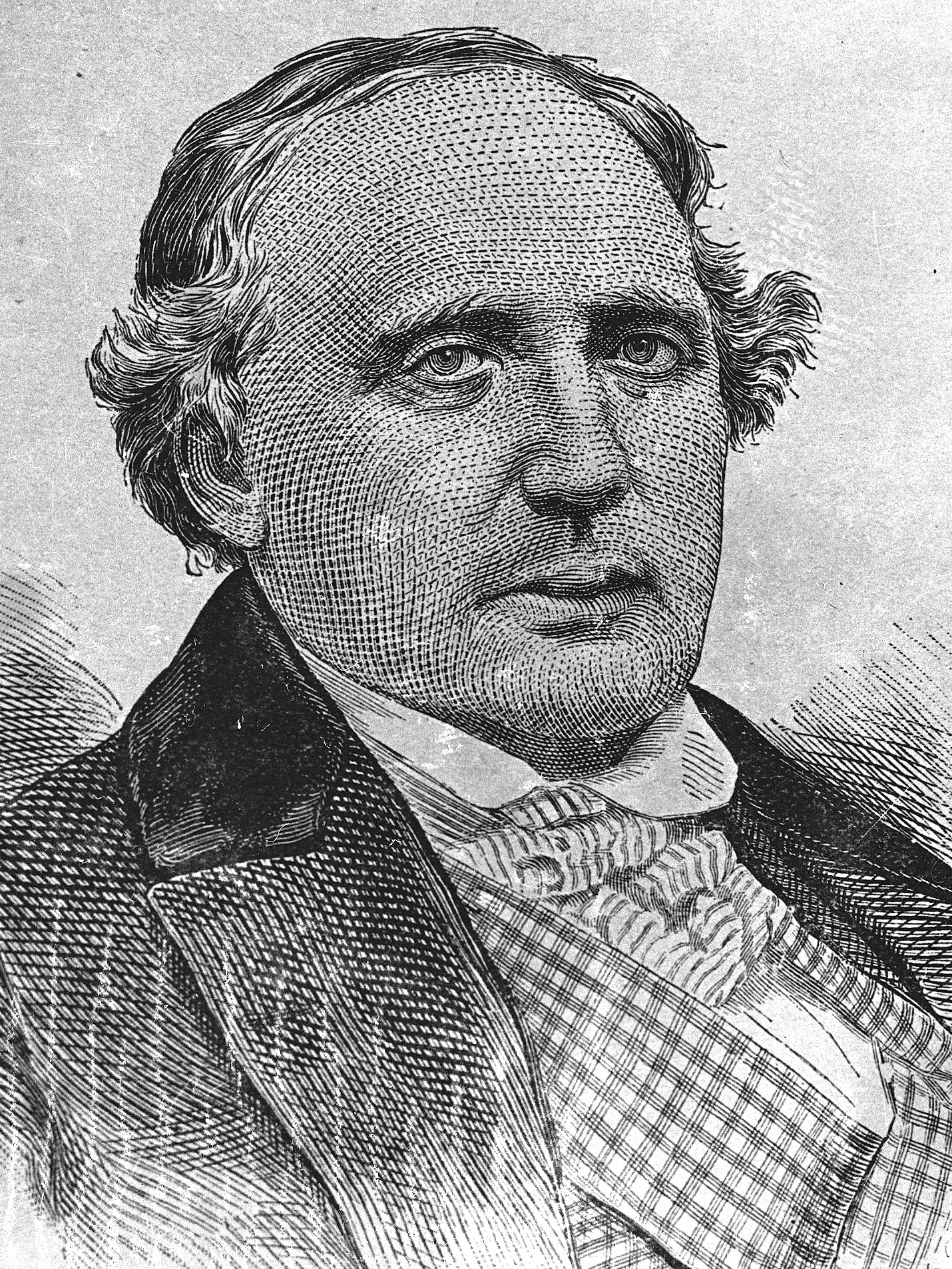

| Nominee | John Wood | Richard Jones Hamilton | Parmenus Bond |
| Party | Republican | Democratic | Know Nothing |
| Popular vote | 110,584 | 106,297 | 18,245 |
| Percentage | 47.03% | 45.21% | 7.76% |
Lieutenant Governor before election
Gustav Koerner
Democratic
Elected Lieutenant Governor
John Wood
Republican

The 1856 Illinois lieutenant gubernatorial election was held on November 4, 1856, in order to elect the lieutenant governor of Illinois. Republican nominee and former member of the Illinois Senate John Wood defeated Democratic nominee Richard Jones Hamilton and Know Nothing nominee Parmenus Bond.

== General election ==
On election day, November 4, 1856, Republican nominee John Wood won the election by a margin of 4,287 votes against his foremost opponent Democratic nominee Richard Jones Hamilton, thereby gaining Republican control over the office of lieutenant governor. Wood was sworn in as the 13th lieutenant governor of Illinois on January 3, 1857.

=== Results ===
Illinois lieutenant gubernatorial election, 1856
| Party | Candidate | Votes | % |
|---|---|---|---|
| Republican | John Wood | 110,584 | 47.03 |
| Democratic | Richard Jones Hamilton | 106,297 | 45.21 |
| Know Nothing | Parmenus Bond | 18,245 | 7.76 |
| Total votes | | 235,126 | 100.00 |
| Republican gain from Democratic | | | |

== See also ==
- 1856 Illinois gubernatorial election
