= Frank M. Clark (businessman) =

American businessman

President of the Chicago Board of Education
- In office July 23, 2015 – May 22, 2019
- Appointed by: Rahm Emanuel
- Preceded by: David J. Vitale
- Succeeded by: Miguel del Valle

Personal details
- Born: 1940s Chicago, Illinois
- Spouse: Vera
- Children: 2
- Education: DePaul University (b. and J.D.)
- Occupation: Business executive
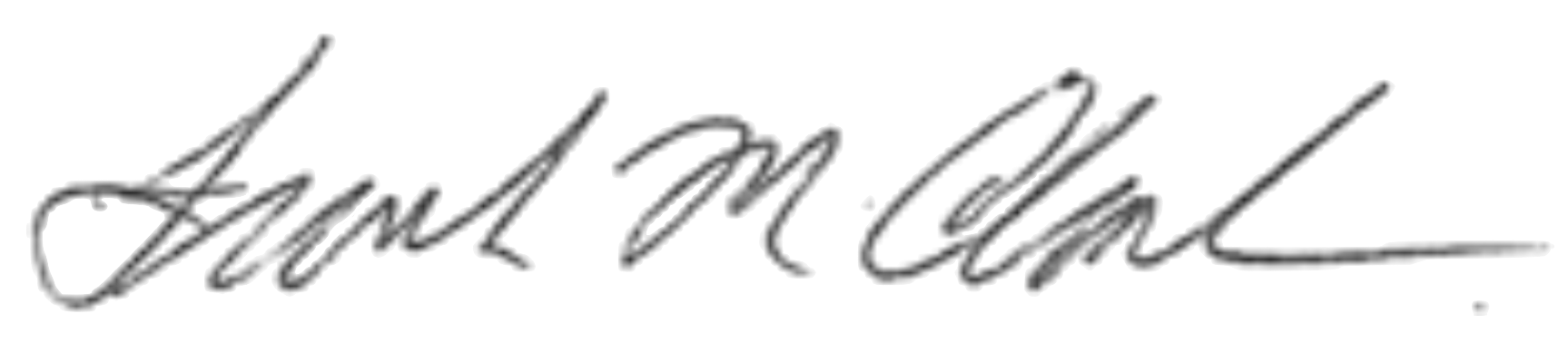
- Signature

Frank M. Clark II is an American businessman who has held executive positions at Commonwealth Edison, Exelon, Aetna, BMO Bank, and Waste Management. Clark also has been involved in politics and government. He was an early backer of Barack Obama's successful 2008 presidential campaign. He was appointed to the board of the Metropolitan Pier and Exposition Authority in 2012 by Illinois Governor Pat Quinn. He was appointed by Rahm Emanuel in 2015 to serve as the president of the Chicago Board of Education, a role he held until 2019.

== Early life and education ==
Clark was born in Chicago in the 1940s. He has remained a resident of Chicago.

At the age of 20, he married his wife, Vera. Their first child, son Frank Clark III, was born in 1967. They later had a second son, Steve.

Clark received his bachelor's degree and Juris Doctor from DePaul University.

== Business ==
In 1966, Clark started his career in the mailroom at the energy services company Commonwealth Edison (ComEd). He would ultimately work his way up to become an executive at the company. Clark's work at ComEd was interrupted by a tour of duty in the Vietnam War, after he was drafted into the military in 1967. From 2001 to 2005, Clark was the president of ComEd. From 2005 until retiring in 2012, he was the chairman and chief executive officer of ComEd. In 2001, he was named asor vice president of ComEd's parent company, Exelon. From 2005 to 2012, he was Exelon's chairman and chief executive officer.

Clark began serving on the board of directors of Aetna in 2006, holding the position until 2018. Clark also a board member of Waste Management, and served as its independent director from 2011 until 2021. Clark was chairman of the board of directors of the BMO Bank North America and non-executive chairman of the board of directors of BMO Financial Group from 2013 to 2017. In 2005, Clark was director of ShoreBank.

== Politics and government ==
Clark was an early backer of Barack Obama's 2008 presidential campaign. He was a major fundraiser for the campaign. Clark had supported and advised Obama in advance the launch of the 2008 campaign, and would continue to be one of Obama's top fundraisers ahead of his 2012 re-election campaign.

In March 2012, Illinois Governor Pat Quinn named Clark an appointee to the Metropolitan Pier and Exposition Authority.

Clark chaired an advisory panel that issued a report on Chicago Public Schools to Chicago Mayor Rahm Emanuel. In 2013, after receiving the report, Emanuel decided to close fifty of the city's neighborhood schools.

Clark also served on the Public Building Commission of Chicago.

Like many other Commonwealth Edison executives, Clark maintained political ties to former Illinois House majority leader Mike Madigan. Clark and ComEd lobbyist John Hooker were the lead plaintiffs in a lawsuit that succeeded in removing a proposed constitutional amendment from Illinois' 2016 election ballot. The amendment, sponsored by a citizens' group through citizen initiative, would have given the responsibility for drawing electoral district maps during redistricting to an independent committee, removing legislators' power to draw the states' electoral maps. This amendment would have weakened the political influence of Madigan. Federal investigators later investigated whether this lawsuit had been pursued at the behest of Madigan in exchange for political favors to ComEd.

=== President of the Chicago Board of Education ===
On July 16, 2015, Mayor Rahm Emanuel announced his nomination of Clark to serve as president of the Chicago Board of Education. This came alongside Emanuel's announcement of Forest Claypool as his nominee to serve as CEO of Chicago Public Schools, marking a simultaneous change in the leadership of both top school officer positions in Chicago. This change of leadership came after a scandal regarding a no-bid contract, which ultimately resulted in Claypool's predecessor CEO, Barbara Byrd-Bennett, being convicted of federal crimes. After being confirmed, Clark took office on July 23, 2015. Clark held the position until 2019.

After CPS CEO Claypool was found by the school district's inspector general to have lied to hide an aide's ethics violation, Clark strongly came to the public defense of Claypool. However, Claypool was ultimately ousted from his position as school district CEO.

Clark ended a previous practice of holding some of the board's meetings at night and in the city's various neighborhoods. He also refused to heed pressure to make board briefings open to the public. He also joined with other board members to vote for the district to hire expensive consultants with ties to Claypool. Clark also regularly asked questions at the board's monthly public meetings that were solely meant to extract and publicize positive news about the school district.

After a new mayor, Lori Lightfoot, took office On May 22, 2019, Clark and the other members of the Chicago Board of Education tendered their resignations so that she could appoint new board members.

== Other work ==
On May 18, 2019, Clark began a three-year term as chancellor of The Lincoln Academy of Illinois. Before this, he had been a trustee of the school.

Clark has been involved a number of educational organizations. He has also served as a member of the RAND Corporation's advisory board, and on the board of trustees of DePaul University. Clark co-founded the Rowe-Clark Math & Science Academy on West Side of Chicago along with Exelon Chairman and CEO John W. Rowe.

Clark served on the board of trustees of the Chicago Museum of Science and Industry. He formerly was the chair of the Adler Planetarium, and is a now life trustee of the museum. Clark co-chaired a capital campaign for the DuSable Museum's efforts to expand. From 2006 to 2016 Clark served on The Chicago Community Trust's executive committee, serving as chair from 2011 to 2016. Clark has served on the boards of University of Chicago Medical Center, Chicago Symphony Orchestra, Abraham Lincoln Presidential Library Foundation, Illinois Manufacturers' Association, Big Shoulders Fund, Chicago Legal Clinic and Metropolitan Family Services, and United Way of Metropolitan Chicago. He was also director of United Way of Metropolitan Chicago, Metropolitan Family Services, and the Illinois Manufacturers' Association. He was also chairman of the boards of the Metropolitan Family Services and Jane Addams Hull House. He is a retired board member and life trustee of the Peggy Notebaert Nature Museum. He also served as president of the Business Leadership Council and president of the Chicago Chapter of American Association of Blacks in Energy. He has also been a member of the executive committee of the Chicago Community Trust and the governing board Illinois Council on Economic Education. Clark is also a member of the Chicago Bar Association, Economic Club of Chicago, Commercial Club of Chicago, and the Executives Club of Chicago.

== Awards and honors ==
Clark has been awarded an honorary Doctor of Humane Letters degree by Governors State University in 2005 and an honorary Doctor of Law degree from his alma mater DePaul University in 2004.

In 2002, Fortune magazine named Clark to its list of the "50 Most Powerful Black Executives in America". In 2008, U.S. Black Engineer & Information Technology Magazine's named clark to its list of the "100 Most Important Blacks in Technology". Clark has also received the "History Makers Award and the National Humanitarian Award" from the National Conference for Community and Justice. St. Joseph College Seminary at Loyola University Chicago gave Clark its Rerum Novarum Award.
