= List of presidents of the Chicago Board of Education =

President of Chicago Board of Education
- Incumbent; Sean Harden since December 11, 2024

The Chicago Public Schools are governed by the Chicago Board of Education, which is led by a president.

Since the 1995 Chicago School Reform Amendatory Act went into effect, the president has been directly appointed by the mayor of Chicago, rather than being elected among the members of the board.

Beginning with the 2026 Chicago Board of Education election, after which the Board of Education is slated to become an entirely-elected board, the president will be directly elected at-large by the city's voters. It will be one of four at-large citywide elected offices in Chicago (alongside the mayor of Chicago, city clerk of Chicago, and city treasurer of Chicago).

== Officeholders ==
=== Chairmen of the Chicago Board of School Inspectors (1840–1857) ===
Until 1857, the head of the school board was known as the "chairman of the Chicago Board of School Inspectors" Written records of the board prior to 1840 are incomplete.

Name	Tenure	Notes	Citation
William Jones	1840–1843		
J. Young Scammon	1843–1845		
William Jones	1845–1848		
E. S. Kimberly	1848		
unknown	1849		
Henry Smith	1850–1851		
William Jones	1851–1852		
Flavel Moseley	1852–1853		
William H. Brown	1853–1854		
Flavel Moseley	1854–1857		

=== Presidents of the Chicago Board of Education (1857–1995) ===
Name	Tenure	Notes	Citation
Flavel Moseley	1857–1858		
Luther Haven	1858–1860		
John Clark Dore	1860–1861		
John H. Foster	1861–1862		
Walter Loomis Newberry	1863		
Charles N. Holden	January 1, 1864–September 1, 1866		
George C. Clarke	1867		
Lorenzo Brentano	1868		
John Wentworth or S. A. Briggs	1869	Sources differ as to whether Wentworth or Briggs was board president in 1869	
William H. King	1869–1870		
Eben F. Runyan	1870–1872		
William H. King	1872–1874		
John H. Richberg	1874–1876		
W. K. Sullivan	1876–1878		
William H. Wells	1878–1880		
Martin Delany	1880–1882		
Norman Bridge	1882–1883		
Adolf Kraus	1883–1884		
James R. Doolittle Jr.	1884–1885		
Adolf Kraus	1885–1886		
Allan C. Story	1886–1888		
Graeme Stewart	1888–1889		
William G. Beale	1889–1890		
Louis Nettlehorst	1890–1891		
John McLaren	1891–1893		
A. S. Trude	1893–1895		
Daniel R. Cameron	1895–1896		
Edward G. Halle	1896–1898		
Graham H. Harris	1898–1902		
Clayton Mark	1902–1905		
Edward Tilden	1905–1906		
Emil W. Ritter	1906–1907		
Otto C. Schneider	1907–1909		
Alfred R. Urion	1909–1910		
James Burton "J. B." McFatrich	1910–1912		
Peter Reinberg	1912−1914		
Michael J. Collins	1914–1915		
Jacob Loeb	1915–1917		
Edwin S. Davis	1917–1922		
John Dill Robertson	1922–1923		
Charles Moderwell	1923–1925		
Edward B. Ellicott	1925–1926	Died in office	
Julius F. Smietanka acting	1926–1927	Served on acting basis	
Walter J. Raymer	1927		
J. Lewis Coath	1927–1928		
H. Wallace Caldwell	1928–1930		
Lewis E. Myers	1930–1933		
James B. McCahey	1933–1947		
Charles J. Whipple	1947–1948		
William B. Traynor	1948–1955		
Sargent Shriver	1955–1960		
Thomas L. Marshall	1960–1961		
William G. Caples	1961–1962		
Clair Roddewig	1962–1964		
Frank M. Whiston	1964–1970		
John D. Carey	1970–1979		
Catherine Rohter	1979–1980		
Kenneth B. Smith	1980–1981		
Raul Villalobos	1981–1983		
Sol Brandzel	1983–1984		
George Muñoz	1984–1987		
Frank Gardner	1987–1989		
James Compton interim	1989–1990	Served on an interim basis	
Clinton Bristow Jr.	1990–1992		
Florence Cox	1992–1993		
D. Sharon Gant	1993–1995		

=== Chairmen of the School Reform Board of Trustees (1995–1999) ===
Name	Tenure	Notes	Citation
Gery Chico	1995–1999	Appointed by Mayor Richard M. Daley	

=== Presidents of the Chicago Board of Education (1999–present) ===
Name	Tenure	Notes	Citation
Gery Chico	1999–2001	Appointed by Mayor Richard M. Daley	
Michael Scott Sr.	2001–2006	Appointed by Mayor Richard M. Daley	
Rufus Williams	2006–2009	Appointed by Mayor Richard M. Daley	
Michael Scott Sr.	2009	Appointed by Mayor Richard M. Daley; died in office	
Mary Richardson-Lowry	2010–2011	Appointed by Mayor Richard M. Daley	
David J. Vitale	2011–2015	Appointed by Mayor Rahm Emanuel	
Frank M. Clark	2016–2019	Appointed by Mayor Rahm Emanuel	
Miguel del Valle	2019–2023	Appointed by Mayor Lori Lightfoot	
Jianan Shi	2023–2024	Appointed by Mayor Brandon Johnson	
Mitchell Johnson	2024	Appointed by Mayor Johnson, served one week before resigning over controversies	
Sean Harden	2024–present	Appointed by Mayor Johnson	
