= Lincoln Park High School (Chicago) =

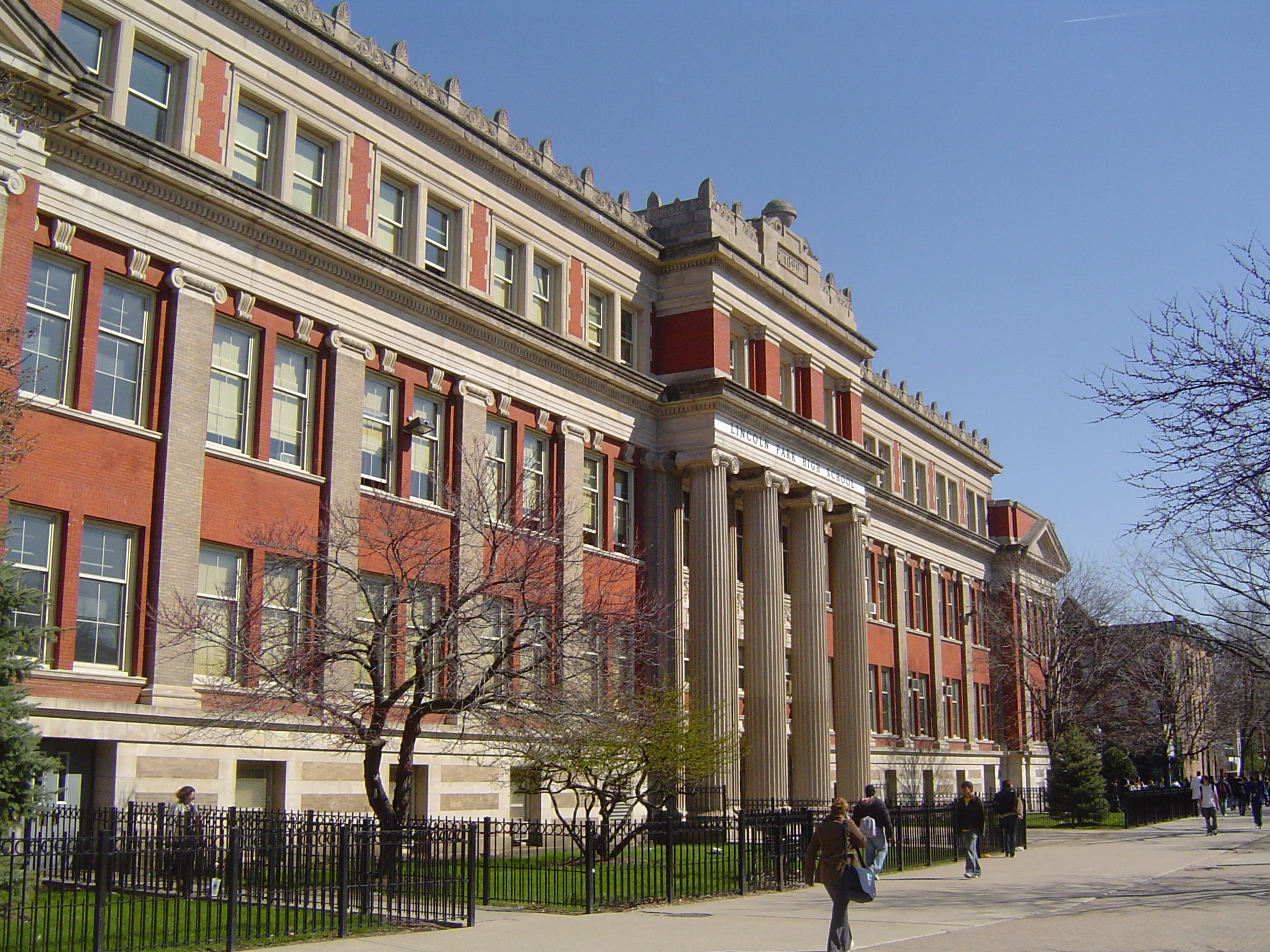

Location
- 2001 North Orchard Street; Chicago, Illinois 60614; United States; 41.9194°N 87.6456°W

Information
- School type: Public; Secondary
- Opened: 1900
- School district: Chicago Public Schools
- CEEB code: 141100
- Principal: Dr. Eric A. Steinmiller
- Grades: 9–12
- Gender: Coed
- Enrollment: 2,123 (2025–2026)
- Average class size: 28
- Campus size: Large
- Campus type: Urban
- Colors: Navy Blue; Gold
- Athletics conference: Chicago Public League
- Mascot: Leo The Lion
- Team name: Lions
- Accreditation: AdvancED
- Newspaper: The Lion's Roar
- Yearbook: Pride
- Website: lincolnparkhs.org

Lincoln Park High School (LPHS) is a public 4–year high school located in the Lincoln Park neighborhood on the north side of Chicago, Illinois, United States. Lincoln Park High School, operated by the Chicago Public Schools district, opened its main present building in 1900. The school borders Oz Park, a public park owned by the Chicago Park District. It was formerly known as North Division High School and then Robert A. Waller High School. In 1981, the school began its International Baccalaureate (IB) program. It was one of the first schools to begin the program within the Chicago Public Schools district.

== History ==
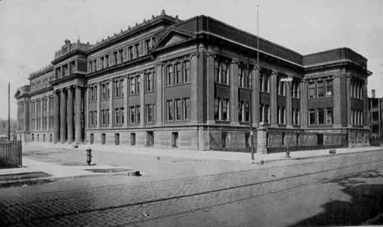
Waller High School (shown here new in 1899) was renamed Lincoln Park High School in 1979.

Lincoln Park High School began as North Division High School, which opened in 1875, as the first public high school on the north side of Chicago. By the late 1890s, the school needed more room, and construction began on the current school building in 1899. This building opened as Robert A. Waller High School in 1900. The students and staff of North Division relocated to the new building and the old name remained in use, alongside the new name, for several decades. By the 1910s, a concern grew that the school would soon need more room, and plans began to expand the school. It would not be until 1928 when land north of the school was obtained, and plans for an annex were pushed forward; plans that were interrupted with start of the Great Depression. The need for more space became critical, and the school's Franklin Branch was opened in 1934 (closing in 1948). In 1938, the school's annex was constructed to alleviate the need for portable classrooms. The new annex included (among other features) two new gyms, which allowed for the original gymnasium to be converted into a lunch room for students. By the 1960s, the school's increased population required the return of portable classrooms as plans began for more expansion. The new north wing included a new lunch room and auditorium, allowing the old lunch room to become an office complex for counselors, and the library to move into the former assembly hall. The 1970s saw problems as the school aged and discipline issues caused the opening of an alternative satellite center for the school. As a part of the revitalization of the school in the late 1970s, the school's name was changed to its current name, and Orchard Street in front of the school was closed to create a mall between neighboring Oz Park and Armitage Street.

== Programs ==
Lincoln Park High School is made up of four smaller programs. Aside for the basic general education program, there is the Performing Arts, Visual Arts, Advanced College Prep (formerly Double Honors), International Baccalaureate (IB) (which is one of the most selective IB programs in the city). Most students take part in classes in more than one program, except for students in the IB program who follow a prescribed curriculum. Students in the IB Diploma Program only take classes with other IB DP students, with the exception of music and/or arts classes, lunch, and physical education. There is a JROTC Program at Lincoln Park. The Performing Arts program requires auditions in order for students to be considered for enrollment. The music program consists of orchestra through all levels from beginning to symphony, and band from beginning to concert/marching band. There is also a jazz band option for advanced musicians. Students participating in the music program (with the exception of those also participating in the IB Diploma program) are required to take two years of Music Theory, at both the regular and AP levels. The drama program has multiple levels and produces numerous shows throughout the school year. The high school classes of the French-American School of Chicago are held at this school; these classes began in 1995.

== Academics ==
Lincoln Park was ranked as #96 in a 2010 Newsweek ranking of top U.S. high schools and was one of only two schools from Illinois to be listed in the top 100. Courses offered according to the IB syllabus are HL English A1, HL/SL History, HL/SL Mathematics, SL Math Studies, HL Biology, HL Chemistry, SL French A1, HL/SL Spanish B, HL/SL French B, SL/Ab Initio Arabic, SL Psychology, SL Physics, SL Music, SL Visual Arts and SL Information Technology in a Global Society. According to the 2020 US News High School Rankings, Lincoln Park is ranked 22nd in Illinois (out of 677) and received an overall score of 97.57 out of 100. Lincoln Park was also ranked #8 in Chicago Public High Schools (out of 167).

== Athletics and sports ==
Lincoln Park competes in the Chicago Public League (CPL) and is a member of the Illinois High School Association (IHSA). Their school teams are named Lions. The boys' basketball were Regional champions and Class AA in (2002–03, 2004–05, 2005–06, 2006–07). The boys' cross country were Class AA in 1984. The girls' cross country were Class AA three times (1998–99, 1999–2000, 2001–02). The sports offered include the following:

=== Boys ===
- Baseball
- Basketball
- Bowling
- Cross Country
- Football
- Golf
- Lacrosse
- 16-inch softball
- Soccer
- Swimming
- Tennis
- Track
- Volleyball
- Water Polo

=== Girls ===
- Basketball
- Bowling
- Cheer
- Cross Country
- Golf
- Lacrosse
- Pom Pom
- Soccer
- Softball
- Swimming
- Tennis
- Track
- Volleyball
- Water Polo

== Feeder patterns ==
Several K-8 schools feed into Lincoln Park High School. All of the attendance zones of Agassiz, Alcott, Abraham Lincoln, Manierre, Oscar Mayer Magnet School, Ogden International School, and Prescott feed into Lincoln Park. In addition portions of the zones of Ogden and Prescott feed into Lincoln Park. However, this is only for the neighborhood program, as all other programs require separate applications to be offered a place of enrollment. As well, all other programs have students enrolled from all over the city. Prior to its 2018 merger with Ogden, Jenner Academy fed into Lincoln Park High.

== Notable alumni ==
- George W. Collins, 1943 — politician
- Wilhelmina Cooper, model
- Dorothy Day, 1914 — journalist and Catholic social activist
- Ken Dunkin, 1984 — politician
- Kim Foxx, 1990 — politician
- Paul Halmos (attended) — mathematician
- Skye P. Marshall, 1999 — actress (Matlock).
- Nicholas Ray (attended) — film director
- Freddy Rodríguez, 1993 — actor
- Terrence Shannon Jr., 2018 - basketball player
- Nate Silver — football quarterback
- Michael Stahl-David (attended) — actor
- Jesse White, 1952 — politician
- Michael Thompson, 2007 — professional basketball player
