= John H. Foster (physician) =

American physician, landowner, and early settler of Chicago (1796–1874)

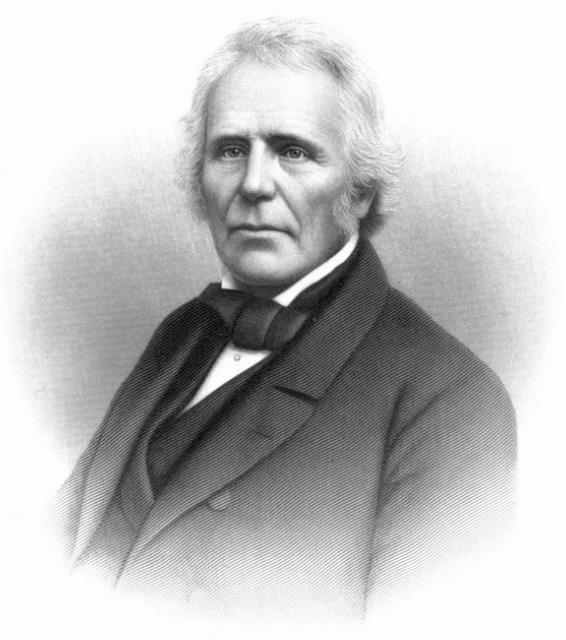

President of the Chicago Board of Education
- In office 1861–1862
- Preceded by: John Clark Dore
- Succeeded by: Walter Loomis Newberry

Personal details
- Born: John Herbert Foster; March 8, 1796 Hillsboro, New Hampshire
- Died: May 18, 1874 (aged 78) Chicago, Illinois
- Resting place: Rosehill Cemetery
- Education: Dartmouth College
- Occupation: Physician and landowner

John Herbert Foster (1796–1874) was an American medical doctor, landowner, and early settler of Chicago who arrived in there in approximately 1835. He served as a member of both the Chicago Board of Education and the Illinois State Board of Education. He served as the president of the Chicago Board of Education in 1861 and 1862.

== Biography ==
Foster was born in Hillsboro, New Hampshire on March 8, 1796. Graduating from the Medical Department of Dartmouth College, he began to practice medicine in Dublin, New Hampshire. In 1832, Foster moved to Morgan County, Illinois, where he continued to practice medicine. Foster worked in the Black Hawk War as a surgeon.

After the death of his brother, who had been stationed as a soldier in Chicago, Foster moved there in approximately 1835 to take over the estate left by his brother, to which he was one of the heirs. From the real estate he inherited, Foster would ultimately amass a substantial fortune.

Amid the Panic of 1837, which halted demand for land sales in Chicago, Foster left his property in the care of his attorney, J. Young Scammon, and moved for one or two years to New England. After his return to Chicago, the economy ultimately began to recover, and with it so did the real estate market.

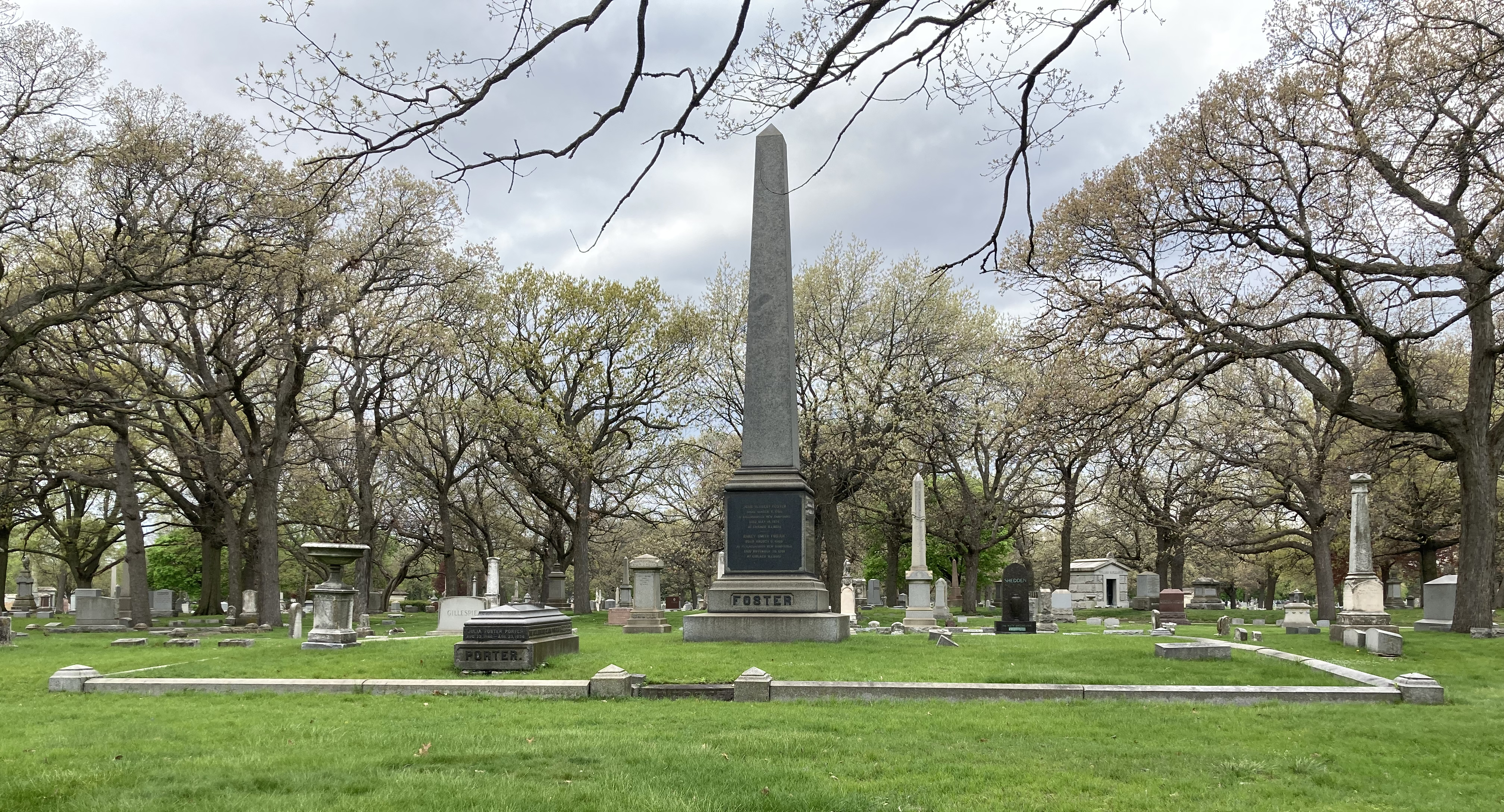
Foster's grave at Rosehill Cemetery

In 1856, he gave $1,000 to establish what would become the Foster Medal Fund. The fund served to procure medals and other rewards of merit for those attending the grammar department of Chicago public schools.

Foster had married Nancy Smith a few years after coming to Chicago.

Foster died at his home in Chicago on May 18, 1874, at the age of 78. He was buried at Rosehill Cemetery.

Foster Avenue in Chicago is named for him. In addition to Foster Avenue, there was a Foster School which was named for him.
