= Chicago Teachers' Federation =

- Founded: 1897
- Location: United States
- Key people: Margaret Haley, Harriet Taylor Treadwell
- Affiliations: AFT, CFL, American Federation of Labor

The Chicago Teachers' Federation was a teachers union in Chicago, Illinois, that was founded in 1897. It is considered a predecessor of today's Chicago Teachers Union.

== History ==
The Chicago Teachers' Federation (CTF) was an organization of women elementary school teachers founded in 1897. In its first few years, it ran a successful campaign to increase teacher pay, and its membership grew to 2,500. In 1900, the CTF elected Catherine Goggin and Margaret Haley as its officers, deciding to pay them the same wages as those made by teachers.

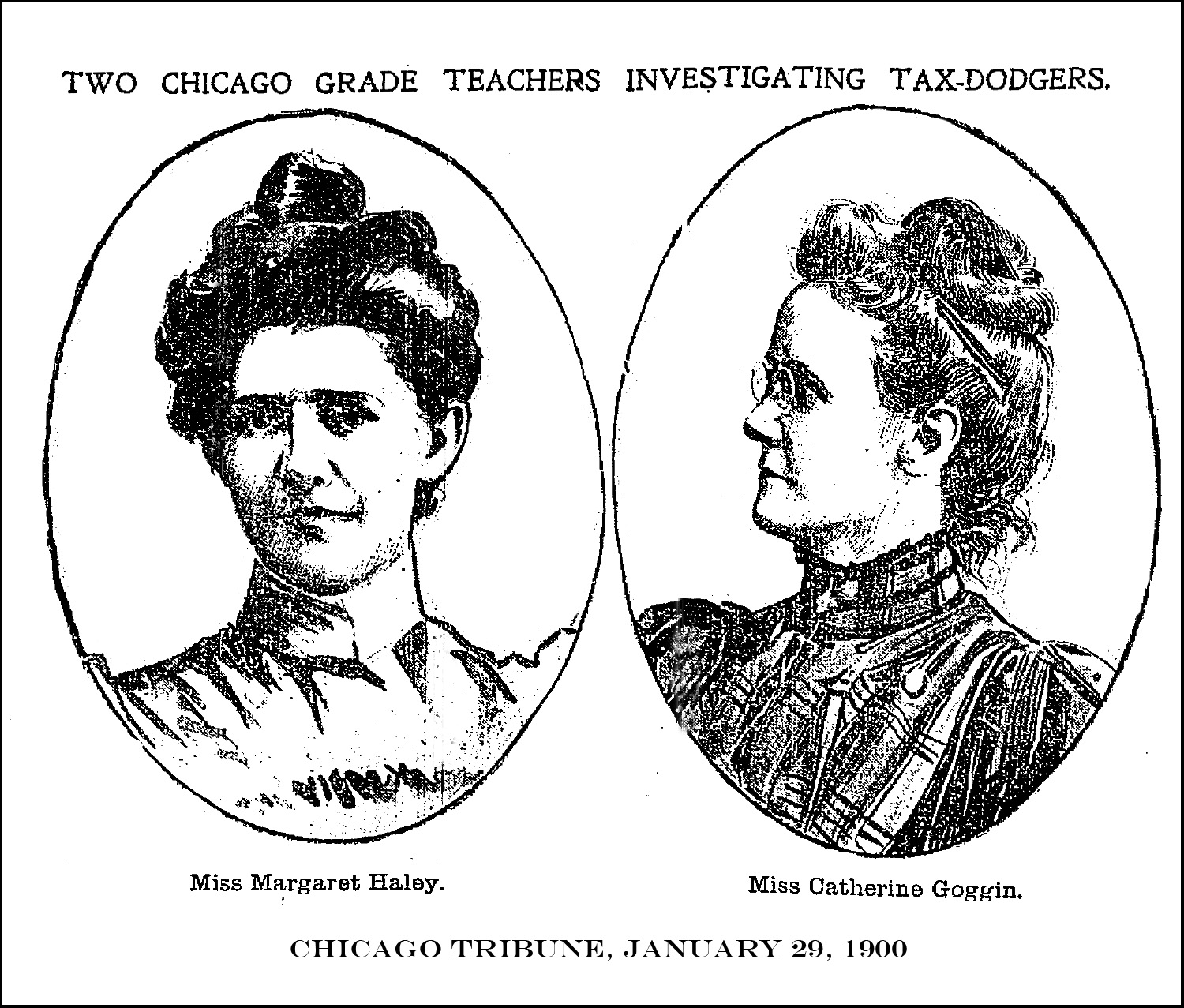
Margaret Haley and Catherine Goggin, two early leaders of the CTF, prompted the investigation of corporate tax evaders as a means of restoring the city's funds.

Under the leadership of Haley and Goggin, the CTF struggled for women's suffrage, for women's rights within the labor movement, and for the right of woman workers to earn as much as their male counterparts. The CTF also launched a successful campaign against corporate tax evasion, the compensation for which was used to pay back salaries upon which the city had reneged.

In 1902, the CTF joined the Chicago Federation of Labor (CFL). It was the first time that a teachers' group had affiliated with a larger labor organization. In 1916, Haley and the CTF helped to found the American Federation of Teachers (AFT), in which the CTF became Local 1. However, the Chicago Board of Education, led by Jacob Loeb, had recently passed a rule against teacher unions:

Membership by teachers in labor unions or in organizations of teachers affiliated with a trade union or a federation or association of trade unions, as well as teachers' organizations which have officers, business agents, or other representatives who are not members of the teaching force, is inimical to proper discipline, prejudicial to the efficiency of the teaching force, and detrimental to the welfare of the public school system. Therefore, such membership, affiliation, or representation is hereby prohibited.

This rule, which became known as the Loeb rule, further stated that teachers would be fired unless they stated in writing that they did not belong to any such organization. The Loeb rule allowed the city to fire 68 teachers, including the CTF leadership, who refused to leave the union. By 1917, the CTF was forced to withdraw from both the CFL and the AFT.

Subsequent passage of the Otis rule placed education in the hands of a centralized Board of Education. However, the board was still appointed by city politicians. In the coming years, the city and the Chicago Board of Education were accused of rampant corruption, particularly in connection with two-time mayor William Hale Thompson. Many CPS employees were appointed by the Mayor, and a 1931 study found that Chicago spent more money than any other major city on operations costs outside of education. The proliferation of bureaucracy was a serious concern: when the Elementary Teachers Union formed in 1928, one of its stated goals was "freeing of teachers from the increasingly intolerable burden of red tape and clerical work.

By the 1930s, Chicago teachers had formed several other different unions, some of which were still segregated by gender. Unrest in the early 1930s served to unite these groups, which previously had difficulty cooperating. The Chicago Teachers' Federation played an active role in the American Federation of Teachers (AFT) and retained their status as Local 1. In 1937, Local 1 battled New York's Local 5 over whether the AFT would remain in the American Federation of Labor (AFL) or join the newer and more inclusive Congress of Industrial Organizations (CIO). (New York's Local 5 was at that time the Teachers' Union, which was soon expelled from the AFT after accusations of communism, and replaced by the more moderate United Federation of Teachers.) Soon after the convention (at which it was decided to stay in the AFL), the Chicago Teachers Union was officially chartered by the AFT as an amalgamation of Chicago's multiple teacher unions in Chicago. At this point about 3,500 teachers were members of the new Local. By September, it was the largest teachers union in the U.S., with over 8,500 members. The CTF, still under the leadership of its longtime head Margaret Haley, remained separate for some years, based on concerns that the CTU would disproportionately represent the interests of males and the interests of high school teachers.
