= Bright Promises Foundation =

Nonprofit organization in Illinois, U.S.

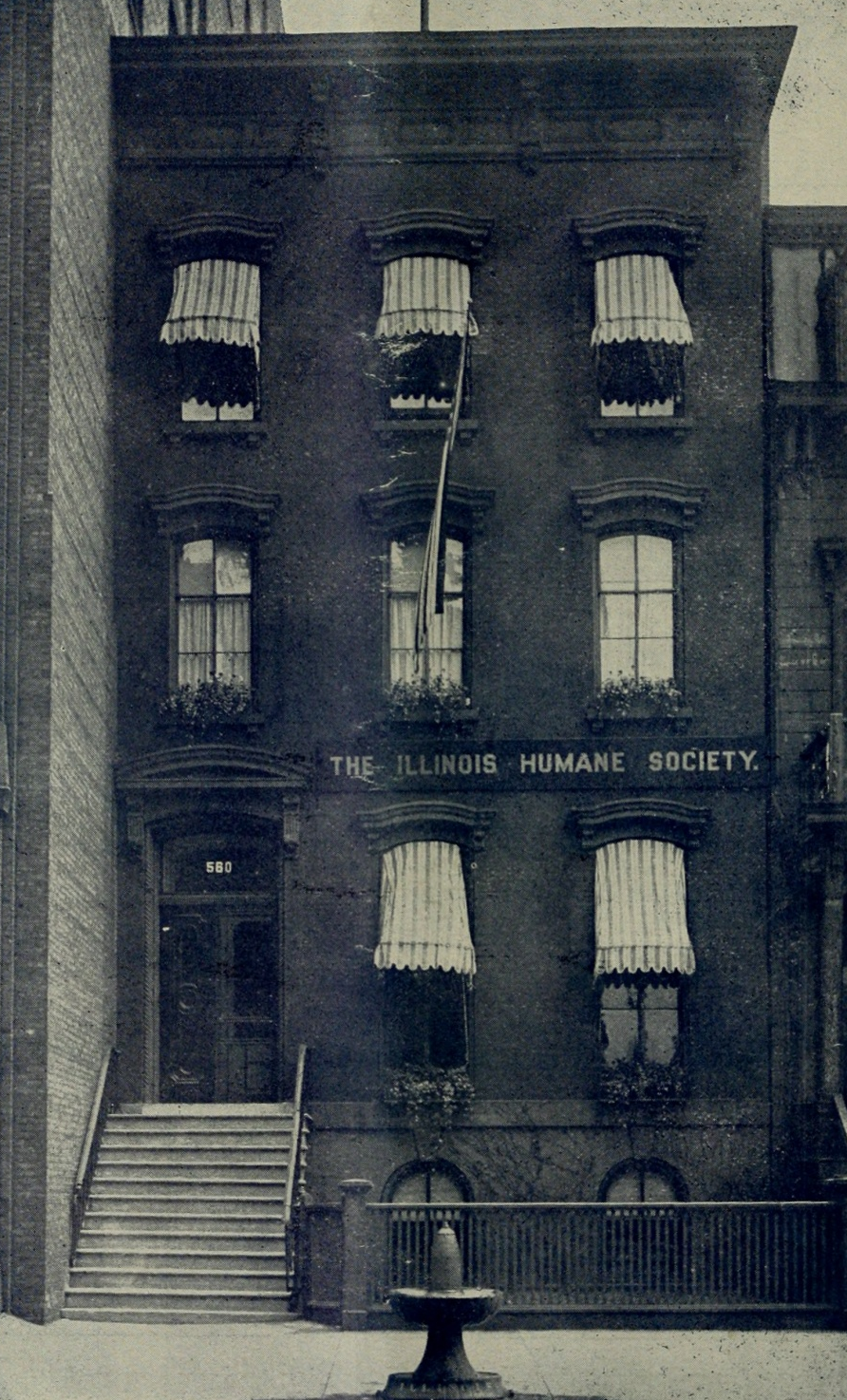
Illinois Humane Society head office, 1913

The Bright Promises Foundation is a nonprofit organization providing services to disadvantaged children in Illinois. Historically the organization was known as the Illinois Humane Society and supported animal welfare.

== History ==
The organization was founded as the Illinois Society for the Prevention of Cruelty to Animals in 1869. It was founded by Edwin Lee Brown and John Clark Dore with the help of George T. Angell, president of the Massachusetts Society for the Prevention of Cruelty to Animals. The Society aimed to prevent cruelty to both children and animals, having legal jurisdiction throughout Illinois. In the 1870s, the Society investigated animal cruelty at the Union Stock Yards which resulted in arrests of individuals who did not feed or water livestock. It added children to its mission in 1877, changing its name to the Illinois Humane Society.

In 1893 friends of the organization, including Marshall Field, Philip Armour, and George Pullman, purchased a home in Chicago to serve as the Society's headquarters. This building was later demolished, but a fixture from the building was removed and rehung at the new Polk Street offices of the Society's Children Service Division. The Society's official magazine, the Humane Advocate began publication in 1906. It was edited by Ruth Ewing.

Edwin Lee Brown was the Society's first president, John C. Dore second, Richard P. Derickson third and John G. Shortall fourth. Shortall was elected president for 29 consecutive years. He was influential in the founding of the American Humane Association. John L. Shortall succeeded his father as fifth president.

As one of the first agencies in the United States to deal with abused and neglected children, the organization advocated for legislation to address child protection in the workplace and society. Its efforts to influence public opinion resulted in the creation of the Juvenile Court in Chicago in 1899 and the Chicago Commission on Youth Welfare in the 1950s. It advocated for the registration of newborn infants, and crusaded against "distillery dairies" to ensure adequate supplies of wholesome milk.

In the 1950s, the organization decided to focus on children exclusively. Its name changed to the Bright Promises Foundation in 2009.

Historical records of the organization are archived at the University of Illinois at Chicago, and a collection of papers are at the Illinois State Historical Library in Springfield.

== A fountain outside Mary McDowell Settlement House ==
There were few opportunities a century ago for travelers on the streets of Chicago to obtain fresh drinking water. In 1877, the Illinois Humane Society began erecting public drinking fountains. They commissioned a design "both pleasing and practical" by which water would flow at three levels, for people at the top, then horses, and finally dogs and small animals near the ground level. The cost was US$70 per fountain, plus $60 for a hookup to the city water pipes, including the services of a plumber and stonemason.

An undated fountain was outside the Mary McDowell Settlement House at 4630 S. McDowell Street, in the Back of the Yards neighborhood. Sixty-seven such fountains were maintained throughout the city at one time. One is still in use at the corner of Chicago Avenue and Michigan Avenue, opposite the Water Tower; a second is on display at the Museum of Science and Industry.

== Programs ==
The organization's website stated in October 2014 that its current focus is on reducing the effects of childhood trauma. "The Urban Youth Trauma Center (UYTC) at the University of Illinois at Chicago Institute for Juvenile Research addresses the needs of urban youth and families exposed to community violence by increasing access to trauma informed services."

== See also ==
- Metropolitan Drinking Fountain and Cattle Trough Association
