= William H. Wells (educator) =

American educator (1812-1885)

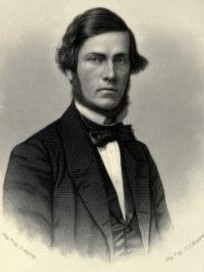
- Wells, circa 1887

President of the Chicago Board of Education
- In office 1878–1880
- Preceded by: W.K. Sullivan
- Succeeded by: Martin Delany

2nd Superintendent of Chicago Public Schools
- In office June 1, 1856 – July 6, 1864
- Preceded by: John Clark Dore
- Succeeded by: Josiah Little Pickard

Personal details
- Born: February 27, 1812 Tolland, Connecticut
- Died: January 21, 1885 (aged 72) Chicago, Illinois
- Profession: Educator and editor

William Harvey Wells (1812–1885) was an American educator who served as the superintendent of Chicago Public Schools from 1856 through 1864.

== Early life and early career ==
Wells was born February 27, 1812, in Tolland, Connecticut. He was the son of a farmer, and received his initial education from a small district school he attended for several weeks in the winter up to the age of seventeen. The fall of 1829 and winter of 1830, at the age of seventeen, he attended an academy in Vernon, Connecticut.

Having decided to become an educator, he attended the Teachers Seminary in Andover, Massachusetts. He would go on to work there for several years as well.

In the summer of 1847, Wells was elected the principal of Putnam Free School in Newbury, Massachusetts.

Wells was involved as an editor of the publication Massachusetts Teacher.

In 1854, the Massachusetts Board of Education appointed him the head of Westfield State Normal School. In May 1856, he resigned this position in order to accept appointment as the superintendent of Chicago Public Schools.

== Superintendency of Chicago Public Schools ==
Wells served as the superintendent of Chicago Public Schools from 1856 through 1864. His tenure formally began on June 1, 1856.

In 1862, Wells published Graded Course of Instruction for the Public Schools of Chicago. In this publication, Wells sought to create uniform guidelines of the curriculum to be taught at different levels, with the intent of implementing this uniform curriculum citywide. This would be adopted by many other cities as a teachers' manual and standard guide, directly shaping education in the United States for many years after.

On July 6, 1864, Wells retired from the position of superintendent.

William H. Wells Community Academy High School in Chicago is named for him.

== Later career ==
From 1878 through 1880, Wells served as President of the Chicago Board of Education.

== Death ==
Wells died in at his home in Chicago on January 21, 1885.
