= Foster Avenue =

Street in Chicago, Illinois

- Dr. John H. Foster Memorial Avenue; 5200 North
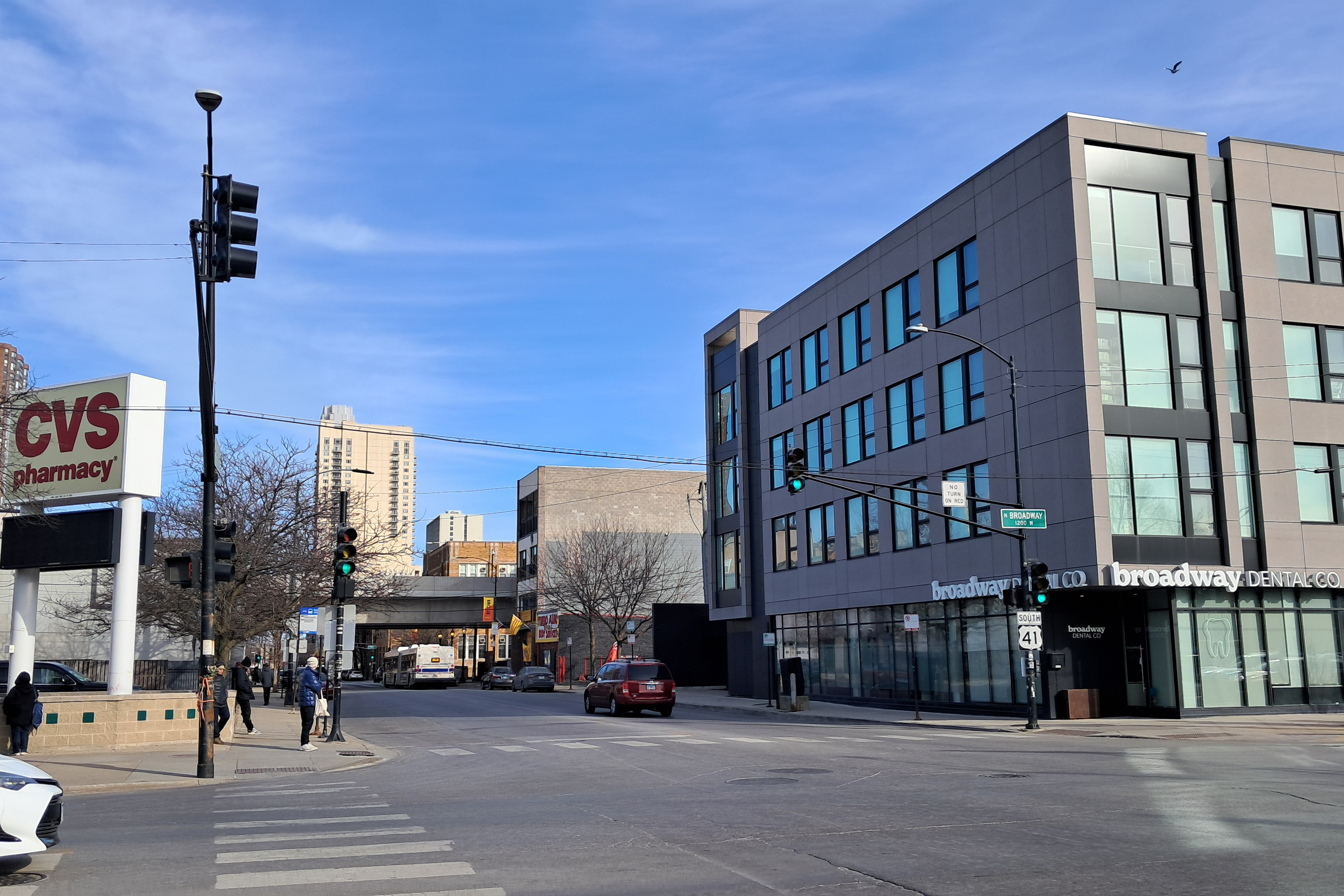
- Foster Avenue at Broadway
- Interactive map of Foster Avenue
- Part of: US 41
- Location: Chicago, Harwood Heights, Norridge, Bensenville, Wood Dale
- Coordinates: 41.9731°N 87.8710°W
- West end: Independence Drive, Bartlett
- East end: Simonds Drive about 600 West, Chicago

Foster Avenue (5200 N) is a major east-west street on the North Side of Chicago as well as the northwestern Chicagoland suburbs in Illinois, US. Foster Avenue serves as the boundary line for the Chicago community areas of Edgewater to the north and Uptown to the south.

Foster Avenue runs westward from Lake Michigan to East River Road (8800 W.) and picks up again west of Des Plaines River Road to connect Chicago to O'Hare Airport. It carries U.S. Route 41 from Lake Shore Drive to Lincoln Avenue.

It is named for early Chicago settler John H. Foster.

== Major neighborhoods ==
- Edgewater
- Uptown
- North Park
- Forest Glen
- Jefferson Park
- Norwood Park
- Norridge
- O'Hare

== Transportation ==
The CTA provides bus service via the 92 Foster bus between Broadway and Milwaukee Avenue. The 50 Damen, 93 California/Dodge, 136 Sheridan/LaSalle Express, 146 Inner Drive/Michigan Express and 147 Outer Drive Express serve the road for short segments.

== Major intersections ==
| County | Location | mi | km | Destinations | Notes |
|---|---|---|---|---|---|
| DuPage | Wood Dale | 0.0 | 0.0 | CR 28 (Wood Dale Road) | Western terminus |
| DuPage | Bensenville | 1.0 | 1.6 | IL 83 (Kingery Highway) to IL 390 Toll (Elgin-O'Hare Expressway) | |
| DuPage | Bensenville | 2.0 | 3.2 | CR 8 (York Road) | Eastern terminus of western section |
| DuPage | Gap in route | | | | |
| Cook | Norridge | 2.0 | 3.2 | River Road | Western terminus of central section |
| Cook | Norridge | 2.5 | 4.0 | IL 171 (Cumberland Avenue) | |
| Cook | Chicago | 4.5 | 7.2 | IL 43 (Harlem Avenue) | |
| Cook | Chicago | 5.8 | 9.3 | I-90 east (Kennedy Expressway) – Indiana | Eastern terminus of central section, I-90 exit 83A, no westbound access |
| Cook | Chicago | Overpass above I-90 closed November 6, 2024, to summer 2026 | | | |
| Cook | Chicago | 5.8 | 9.3 | I-90 west (Kennedy Expressway) – Wisconsin | Western terminus of eastern section, I-90 exit 83A, no eastbound access |
| Cook | Chicago | 7.0 | 11.3 | IL 50 (Cicero Avenue) | |
| Cook | Chicago | 7.1 | 11.4 | I-94 (Edens Expressway) – Wisconsin | I-94 exit 42, no eastbound access |
| Cook | Chicago | 9.9 | 15.9 | US 41 north (Lincoln Avenue) | Western end of US 41 concurrency |
| Cook | Chicago | 11.5 | 18.5 | US 14 north (Broadway) | Eastern terminus of US 14 |
| Cook | Chicago | 12.1 | 19.5 | US 41 south (DuSable Lake Shore Drive) | Eastern terminus, interchange |
1.000 mi = 1.609 km; 1.000 km = 0.621 mi: Concurrency terminus; Incomplete access
