= James Compton =

American businessman and civil rights activist

- Born: James Washington Compton; April 7, 1939 (age 87); Aurora, Illinois, U.S.
- Education: Morehouse College
- Occupations: Businessman; civil rights activist
- Years active: 1964–present
- Known for: President and CEO of The Chicago Urban League (1978–2006)

James Washington Compton (born April 7, 1939), also known as Jim Compton, is an American businessman and civil rights activist who served as president and CEO of the Chicago Urban League from 1978 until 2006. During his tenure, the Chicago Urban League refocused its interest in education and economic development and developed a new emphasis on community empowerment. Compton received the Fred Luster Sr, Image Award for his work at the Black Heritage Performance in 1999.

== Early life and education ==
Born in Aurora, Illinois, Compton grew up in Chicago. Compton received a bachelor's degree in political science from Morehouse College in 1961. While at Morehouse, Compton received the Charles E. Merrill Fellowship, which enabled him to study at the University of Grenoble in France from 1959–1961. He also participated as a student representative of the United States in the US-Soviet Union Cultural Exchange Program from 1959–1960.

== Career ==
At Morehouse College, Compton worked with Benjamin Mays, the college president and legendary educator. Compton was active in the Civil Rights Movement in Atlanta and brought that interest with him to Chicago. Compton worked with Martin Luther King Jr. and the Southern Christian Leadership Conference (SCLC) in 1966 when King moved to Chicago to initiate a campaign to end discrimination in housing, employment and schools in the north. Prior to returning to Chicago, Compton served as the founding Executive Director of the Broome County Urban League in Binghamton, New York. Compton was with the National Urban League and the Chicago Urban League in various capacities until he was named President and CEO of the Chicago Urban League in 1978. In addition to putting the agency on a firm financial base, Compton is credited with changing the organization from primarily a social service organization to a research organization advocating for public policy, ensuring that the League had a voice on issues affecting the urban poor and the African American community.

== Corporate director ==
Compton has served as a member of several corporate and charitable boards of directors, including ComEd, DePaul University, Ariel Investments, ETA Creative Arts Foundation, Big Shoulders Fund, Morehouse Research Institute, and the Seaway Bank and Trust Company. Compton has also been Board President of the Chicago Public Library and served as the interim president of the Chicago Board of Education from 1989 through 1990, and is a life trustee of the Field Museum of Natural History.
