= Walter Loomis Newberry =

Chicago businessman and founder of the Newberry library (1804–1868)

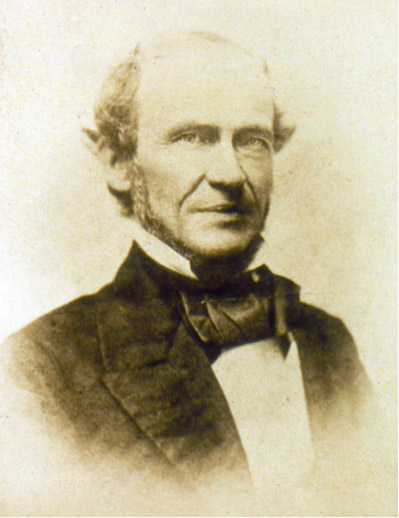

President of the Chicago Board of Education
- In office 1863–1863
- Preceded by: John H. Foster
- Succeeded by: Charles N. Holden

Chicago alderman from the 9th ward
- In office 1851–1853 Serving with F.C. Hageman (1851–52); John H. Kinzie (1852–53)
- Preceded by: R. J. Hamilton
- Succeeded by: Harry A. Mitchell

Personal details
- Born: September 18, 1804 East Windsor, Connecticut, US
- Died: November 6, 1868 (aged 64) at sea
- Occupation: businessman and philanthropist
- Known for: Newberry Library
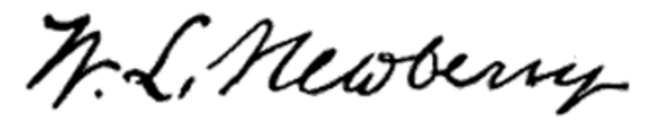
- Signature

Walter Loomis Newberry (September 18, 1804 – November 6, 1868) was the son of Amasa and Ruth (Warner) Newberry. He was an American businessman and philanthropist, whose will provided for the creation of the Newberry Library in Chicago, Illinois.

== Career ==
Newberry received an appointment to the United States Military Academy, but had to decline for health reasons. In 1822, Newberry and his brother Oliver went into the shipping business in Buffalo, New York. They moved to Detroit, Michigan in 1826 and founded a successful dry goods company. Newberry joined a syndicate that included William Astor and Lewis Cass, investing in real estate in what would become Chicago, Milwaukee, and Green Bay; he moved to Chicago in 1833 and continued to prosper in banking and real estate. He became President of the Galena and Chicago Union Railroad, the first railroad built from Chicago.

From 1851 to 1853 he served as an Alderman on the Chicago Common Council from the 9th ward.

From 1859 through 1863, he served on the Chicago Board of Education. In 1863, he served as president of the Chicago Board of Education.

== Later life and death ==
Newberry died in 1868 on the steamship Periere while en route to France.

== Legacy ==
His will provided for his wife and daughters during their lifetimes, and further provided that if his daughters Julia Rosa and Mary Louisa died without issue, half his remaining estate would go to found a public library in Chicago. Mary Louisa died in 1874, and Julia Rosa in 1876, neither having married or had children. By the time that Newberry's widow, Julia Butler Newberry, died in 1885, the Chicago Public Library was already well-established as a circulating library. The trustees of Newberry's will therefore used the bequest to establish the Newberry Library as a non-circulating reference library. A Chicago public school in Chicago's Lincoln Park neighborhood and Chicago's Newberry Avenue are named for him.

== Personal life ==
Newberry was the uncle of U.S. Congressman John Stoughton Newberry as well as physician John Strong Newberry.

=== Brother ===
Oliver Newberry (17 November 1789 – 30 July 1860), a brother of Walter Loomis Newberry, born in East Windsor, Connecticut. He served during the War of 1812, and also during the Black Hawk War. In 1816 he settled in Buffalo, New York, but in 1820 he went to Detroit, where he established himself in business. Soon after his arrival in Detroit, he secured government contracts to furnish all supplies to the numerous forts and Indian trading-posts in the northwest. He was unable to obtain suitable transportation, and was compelled to build a vessel for his own use. Afterward, he constructed other vessels during successive years until he became one of the largest owners of shipping on the lakes.

In 1833, he built the Michigan, his first steamboat and the largest one launched to that date for the lake trade. Several warehouses were constructed by him along the Detroit riverfront, where his schooners, brigs, and steamboats were loaded. He was elected an alderman in Detroit in 1831, and he was involved in the early history of Michigan railroads. For many years, he carried all of his business papers in his hat, and was rarely seen uncovered. He was known as the “commodore” of the lakes, and was sometimes called “the steamboat king.” He died in Detroit.
