= The Chicago Reporter =

Periodical in Chicago, Illinois

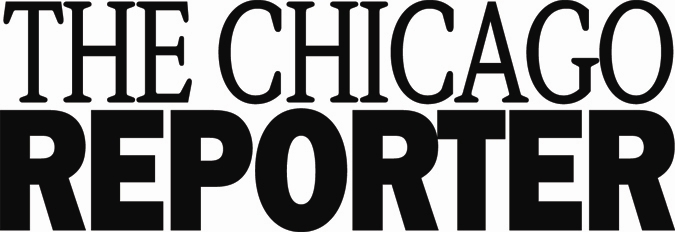

- Cover of the November/December 2013 issue
- Frequency: Monthly
- Founded: 1972
- Company: Community Renewal Society
- Country: United States
- Based in: Chicago, Illinois
- Language: English
- Website: www.chicagoreporter.com
- ISSN: 0300-6921

The Chicago Reporter is a monthly periodical based in Chicago, Illinois, USA. Founded in 1972, it covers poverty and race issues. It was founded by John A. McDermott, who sought to create "the nation's first publication devoted to analyzing and investigating local racial issues." In 1974, its yearly budget was $120,000, most of which was paid by the Ford Foundation. In 2016, sister publication Catalyst, focused on education, merged into The Chicago Reporter.

The interim editor and publisher is Glenn Reedus.

== Impact ==
The Chicago Reporter's investigative reporting has had impact in several areas of Chicago and Illinois infrastructure. The paper's earliest influence was its expose of the Chicago Police Department's discriminatory disorderly conduct arrests in 1982, which prompted the American Civil Liberties Union (ACLU) to file suit against them, leading to a U.S. District Court Judge to rule their arrests unconstitutional. By 1983, the Chicago Police Department's disorderly arrest policy had to be changed to meet federal law. In 2007, The Chicago Reporter also released a study detailing how the largest mortgage lender in the country, Countrywide, was lending high interest loans in majority to minority lenders leading then attorney general of Illinois Lisa Madigan to subpoena Countrywide, ultimately resulting in an $8.7 billion settlement in 2008. The Chicago Reporter also won recognition for reporting on the Chicago Fire Department's under-reporting fire deaths in poor and minority neighborhoods.

== Reputation ==
The Chicago Reporter's style is regarded as "dispassionate investigative journalism" that has garnered it critical acclaim by several other news publications as well as politicians. U.S. Senator for Illinois, Dick Durbin, has said, "The Chicago Reporter gives us reflection, not reflex. In a digital world of speed and brevity, their coverage takes the time and invests the analysis in issues ranging from gun control to deficits to immigration. The Chicago Reporter earns its stripes with credibility and relevance". Clarence Page of the Chicago Tribune stated "The Chicago Reporter is 'consistently focused on covering what continues to be Chicago's toughest, yet most important story: race relations.'"

=== Awards ===
The Chicago Reporter and its staff have won several awards beginning in 1974, including the Sigma Delta Chi Award for Public Service from the Society of Professional Journalists, dozens of Peter Lisagor Awards, and the Salute to Excellence Award from the National Association of Black Journalists.
