= Ogden International School =

Location
- East Campus (K-4): 24 W. Walton St., Chicago, IL 60610; Jenner Campus (PreK and 5-8): 1119 North Cleveland Ave., Chicago, IL 60610; West Campus (9-12): 1250 W. Erie St., Chicago, IL 60642; United States

Information
- School type: Public K-12, Magnet
- Opened: 1857
- School district: Chicago Public Schools
- Principal: Mr. Devon Herrick
- Head of West Campus: Dr. Sarah Garr
- Head of East Campus: Dr. Maura Kelly
- Head of Jenner Campus: Erin Neidt
- Grades: Pre-K-12
- Gender: Coed
- Campuses: West Campus, East Campus, Jenner Campus
- Campus type: Urban
- Colors: Green, black, grey
- Slogan: A neighborhood school with a worldly spirit.
- Athletics: Yes
- Mascot: Owl
- Nickname: Owls Nest
- Team name: Ogden Owls
- Website: ogden.cps.edu

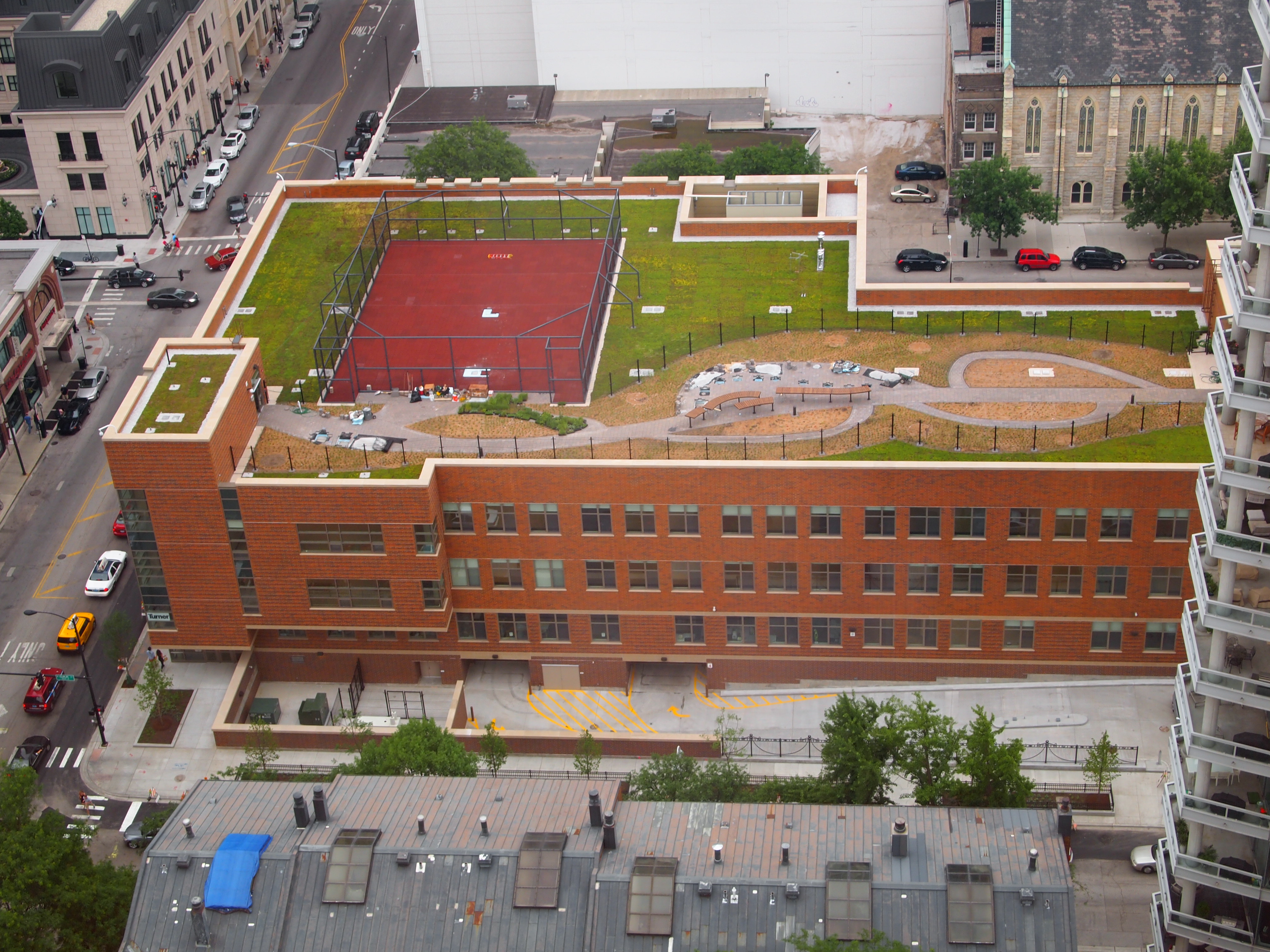
Aerial view of the East (elementary) campus

Ogden International School of Chicago is a public K-12 school in Chicago, Illinois founded in 1857. It is a part of Chicago Public Schools (CPS). It maintains three campuses: East Campus with elementary grades, Jenner Campus with middle school and preschool grades, and West Campus with high school grades. East Campus is located in Gold Coast area of the Near North Side, and West Campus is located in West Town. Effective September 2018 gained an additional campus, the former Jenner School campus in the Cabrini-Green area. The grade alignments are: Kindergarten through Grade 4 at the East Campus, Pre-Kindergarten and Grades 5–8 at Jenner, and grades 9–12 at the West Campus.

It has an attendance boundary for grades K-8, and it serves sections of the Near North Side and the Chicago Loop. Sections of the Near North Side served by Ogden include Gold Coast, River North. and Streeterville. Its high school is selective admissions only. Students zoned to Ogden for K-8 are zoned to either Wells Community Academy High School or Lincoln Park High School for senior high. Any graduate from Ogden's 8th grade program may automatically move on to the 9th grade at Ogden, but students who did not graduate from Ogden's middle school must apply to the high school.

In 2009 Azam Ahmed of the Chicago Tribune described it as "One of Chicago's more successful public schools".

== History ==
It was first established as an elementary school in 1857, and its original name was William B. Ogden Elementary School, after Mayor of Chicago William B. Ogden. Its previous standalone campus, dedicated in 1884, was located at 9 W. Oak Street, and it did not have a cafeteria, a playground, a gymnasium, nor an assembly hall. In 1946 the Chicago Tribune referred to it as "one of the most obsolete buildings in the city." The school district owned a parcel, acquired in 1945, located within Dearborn, Oak, State, and Walton Streets, and a new $1 million ($14418777.94 according to inflation) 13 classroom brick and stone building was proposed and recommended for construction by the bureau of research and building survey. In addition to having the four features lacking in the previous building, it was also to have six restrooms, an adjustment room, a teacher's lounge, and a kindergarten area.

Around 2007 the middle school grades were relocated to the West Town campus.

In 2009 Ogden's senior high school division was established, and its first senior class graduated in 2013. That year the elementary building was due to undergo a $60 million renovation. Some parents were opposed to the plan to temporarily house elementary students at either the Schiller School or the Sojourner Truth School, both in the Cabrini-Green area.

In 2015 parents at the school held a fundraiser in order to prevent CPS from laying off teachers at the school: it raised over $130,000 in a single day.

In 2015 the principal of Ogden and the principal of Jenner Academy of the Arts, a K-8 school in Cabrini-Green, proposed merging their schools; Ogden was overcrowded while Jenner was under-enrollment and was threatened with closure. Around the time Jenner had 239 students, 98% African-American and almost all low income; its building capacity was 1,060. Some parents approved of the merger, while others opposed it. At first the merger proposal was canceled as there was not enough time left to get it accomplished for the 2015–2016 school year, and aside from the opposition of some parents, the CPS had what David Matthews of DNA Info referred to as "lukewarm support". CPS head Janice Jackson had stated that there was not enough "due diligence" done in order for the merger to go through. In August 2016 the discussions on how to merge the schools resumed, and in December of that year CPS confirmed that the process of merging the schools would begin. The CPS board voted unanimously for the merger in February 2018, and the merger is scheduled for September 2018.

Campuses

== Student body ==
As of 2016 it had about 1,800 students. 45% were White, and 20% were low income. 15 native languages, including English, are represented.
