= Chicago Federation of Labor =

American umbrella organization for unions

- Founded: November 9, 1896
- Headquarters: Chicago, Illinois, US
- Location: United States
- Members: Approx. 500,000 in 320 unions
- Key people: Robert G. Reiter, Jr.
- Affiliations: AFL–CIO
- Website: www.chicagolabor.org

The Chicago Federation of Labor (CFL) is an umbrella organization for unions in Chicago, Illinois, US. It is a subordinate body of the AFL–CIO, and as of 2011 has about 320 affiliated member unions representing half a million union members in Cook County.

The labor body is also involved in political lobbying, often in alliance with other allied organizations (e.g., Interfaith Worker Justice), is active in Chicago politics, and participates in many of Chicago's civic committees (composed of business and city leaders).

== Early years ==
The CFL was formed by the American Federation of Labor (AFL) on November 9, 1896. In part, the federation was an outgrowth of previous umbrella labor bodies in the city, many of which had fragmented during the previous two decades. But, in part, the formation of the CFL was an attempt to end corruption in Chicago's labor unions. Only over time did the CFL change its focus to strengthening the efforts of individual union locals by creating a unified voice for the city's labor movement, uphold the labor rights of its union members, and mediate contract disputes on behalf of local unions. Unfortunately, the CFL was dominated in its early years by Martin "Skinney" Madden, a notoriously corrupt labor leader who had managed to get himself elected President, Vice President and Treasurer for life in his Steamfitters' local in Chicago.

The early years of the CFL saw corrupt and reform elements battle for control. The CFL's constitution required an election for the presidency every six months, which encouraged instability, and a new president was elected roughly every year in the organization's first decade. Elections were also rife with fraud and violence. In January 1903, Madden arranged to have the names of all the reform candidates placed low on the ballot, many names were misspelled to deny the candidate election, and some names omitted altogether. Unions on both sides padded their membership lists in order to have more delegates to the convention. At least seven major brawls broke out on the convention floor, and one man was injured so badly he had to be rushed to the hospital. Only police intervention brought order. The July 1904 election saw such widespread violence (including fistfights in front of the ballot boxes). Three brawlers had to be carried home.

Reform elements began to get the upper hand in 1905. Charles Dold was elected in January of that year despite ballot irregularities, accusations of bribery, and ballot box stuffing. When Dold appeared to have enough support to win re-election on July 16, 1905, Madden's supporters attempted to prevent his victory by smashing ballot boxes and destroying ballots. Madden's thugs severely beat Michael Donnelly, a Dold supporter and international president of the Amalgamated Butcher Workmen, on the floor of the convention in full view of hundreds of delegates. Madden disrupted the election so much that a new election was held on August 6. Again, Madden used violence and fraud to force cancellation of the election. Dold finally won re-election on August 13. Madden's forces boycotted the August 13 election and claimed the results were invalid. He pressured the CFL into invalidating the election on August 20, but public outcry and an investigation by the AFL led the CFL to reverse itself on September 3.

John Fitzpatrick was elected CFL president on January 21, 1906. Despite repeated attempts to deny reform delegates seats at subsequent conventions and install his own puppet as CFL president, Dold and Fitzpatrick branded Madden a dual unionist for being under the control of organized crime. They campaigned actively against him and his most powerful supporter throughout the fall and winter. More than 150 policemen were on guard in the convention hall on January 21 to ensure that there was no repeat of the violence of 1905. Fitzpatrick easily outpolled his opponent, two to one.

== Fitzpatrick regime ==
Fitzpatrick's election ushered in an era of stability and reform for the labor federation. The CFL gained increasing amounts of autonomy, and became one of the nation's leading central labor federations. For a while, William Z. Foster and his circle, briefly organized as the International Trade Union Educational League became influential. In the 1910s and during World War I, Fitzpatrick oversaw mass organizing drives in steel and meatpacking, led by Foster. The CFL also affiliated the Chicago Federation of Teachers, providing critical support for the nascent teachers' union movement. After World War I, the CFL was active in the formation of the short-lived Labor Party of the United States. Fitzpatrick endorsed socialism and remained a political progressive for the rest of his life, although he also fought bitterly to keep communists out of the labor movement.

Fitzpatrick's presidency was also notable for its emphasis on ending the corruption that plagued the CFL during the Madden era. He worked closely with fellow reformer Illinois State Federation of Labor President Reuben Soderstrom to combat the influence of organized crime on organized labor. Fitzpatrick also worked to counter perceived press bias against labor. From 1926 through 1979, the Chicago Federation of Labor operated a radio station, WCFL, as the "Voice of Labor" in the Midwest.

== Post-WWII era ==
Fitzpatrick died in office in September 1946 at the age of 75. His successor was William A. Lee, a vice president of the Teamsters. Lee expanded CFL's role in the politics. Although personally a conservative, Lee continued to support a broad liberal agenda. Lee was a close friend to Chicago Mayor Richard J. Daley, and a very strong backer of the Cook County Democratic Party. Although the AFL and the Congress of Industrial Organizations merged in 1955, the respective Chicago bodies did not do so until 1962. Lee was elected president of the unified organization, and remained so until his death in 1984.

Since Lee's death, there have been six presidents of the Chicago Federation of Labor, about one every five years. Twice (Robert Healey and Don Turner) the presidency has gone to a member from the Chicago Federation of Teachers, giving the teachers union a top spokesperson in the labor federation for 14 of the last 23 years. Healey was the first president since Charles Dold in 1905 to retire from the presidency rather than die in office. Under Healey, the CFL began to distance itself from its close relationship with the Democratic Party to take a more independent stance on issues. Under Turner, the CFL emphasized community investment, workforce development, affordable living, and an end to urban sprawl.

In 2010, CFL delegates elected Jorge Ramirez (UFCW Local 1546) the first Mexican-American president of the organization. Ramirez's tenure was marked by a boom in construction and tourism, as well as an attack on public sector unions by right-leaning organizations.

In 2018, Robert G. ("Bob") Reiter, Jr. was elected president after serving 8 years as the CFL's Secretary-Treasurer. Reiter, a member of Operating Engineers Local 150 and an attorney, is considered a progressive in the labor movement.

== Presidents of the CFL ==
Following is a list of the presidents of the Chicago Federation of Labor.

- Thomas Preece, November 10, 1896 – February 7, 1897
- P. F. Doyle, February 8, 1897 – January 15, 1898
- William T. Dunn, January 16 – July 16, 1898
- P. F. Doyle, July 17, 1898 – July 16, 1899
- James Daly, July 17, 1899 – July 16, 1900
- John Fitzpatrick, July 16, 1900 – January 16, 1901
- James H. Bowman, January 17, 1901 – July 20, 1902
- George Lighthall, July 21, 1902 – January 18, 1903
- William Schardt, January 19, 1903 – January 15, 1905
- Charles M. Dold, January 16, 1905 – January 20, 1906
- John Fitzpatrick, January 21, 1906 – 1946
- William Lee, 1946–1984
- Edward F. Brabec, 1984–1986
- Robert Healey, 1987–1994
- Michael Bruton, 1994–1995
- Don Turner, 1995–2002
- Dennis J. Gannon, 2002–2010
- Jorge Ramirez, 2010–2018
- Robert G. Reiter, Jr., 2018-present
