= Margaret Haley =

American teacher, trade unionist, and activist

Margaret A. Haley
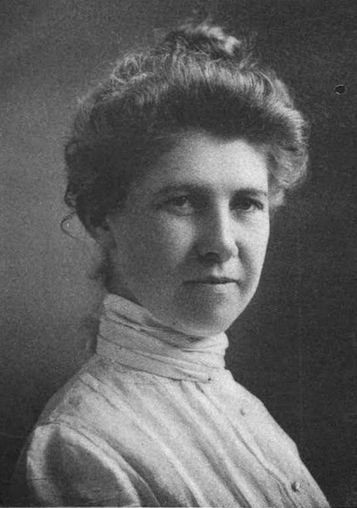
- Born: November 15, 1861 "Margaret Haley". Britannica. Joliet, Illinois, U.S.
- Died: January 6, 1939 (aged 77); Chicago, Illinois, U.S.
- Occupations: Business Representative of Chicago Teachers Federation; union organizer
- Parent(s): Michael and Elizabeth (née Tiernan) Haley

Margaret A. Haley (November 15, 1861 – January 5, 1939) was a teacher, unionist, and Georgist land value tax activist, who was dubbed the "lady labor slugger". Haley was the first business representative of the Chicago Teachers Federation (CTF) and a pioneer leader in organizing schoolteachers. During her long career with the CTF, Haley fought to correct tax inequalities, increase the salaries of teachers, and expose unfair land leasing by the Chicago Board of Education.

== Early life and teaching career ==
Haley was born in Chicago, Illinois, in 1861 to Irish immigrant parents; her mother came from Dublin, Ireland, and her father was born in Montreal, Quebec, Canada to Irish immigrants from County Clare, Ireland. For the first six years of her life, she lived on a farm. Her parents supported agrarian activism, including the grange. Economic upheaval in the 1880s and the depression of the 1890s contributed to her later activism. At the Illinois Normal School in Bloomington, Illinois. Haley imbibed the lessons of single-tax advocate Henry George. At the Cook County Normal School and the Buffalo School of Pedagogy, she received instruction from progressive educators Francis Wayland Parker and William James. Family financial troubles prompted Haley to begin teaching at age 16 at a country school in Grundy County, Illinois. She moved to Chicago in 1882 to teach in the Cook County school system. In 1884, she took a position as a sixth grade teacher at the Hendricks School in the Stockyards district on Chicago's South Side. She remained there until ending her career as a teacher in 1900.

== Chicago Teachers' Federation ==
Haley joined the Chicago Teacher's Federation in 1898, and was one of the organization's first district vice-presidents. The fight against the Harper Commission in 1898 constituted Haley’s first major fight as a member of the Chicago Teachers' Federation. William Rainey Harper, president of the University of Chicago, headed a commission that proposed a complete restructuring of the Chicago school system.

The Harper Report called for the superintendent’s increased power, the instilling of corporate-like efficiency in the schools, the reduction of the school board’s size, the increase of “experts” in educational leadership positions, and the introduction of a salary system based on merit that would favor male high school teachers and administrators over the largely female elementary school teachers. Perhaps most well known, the Harper Commission also proposed ninety-nine year leases, not subject to taxation, of school property for Chicago businesses.

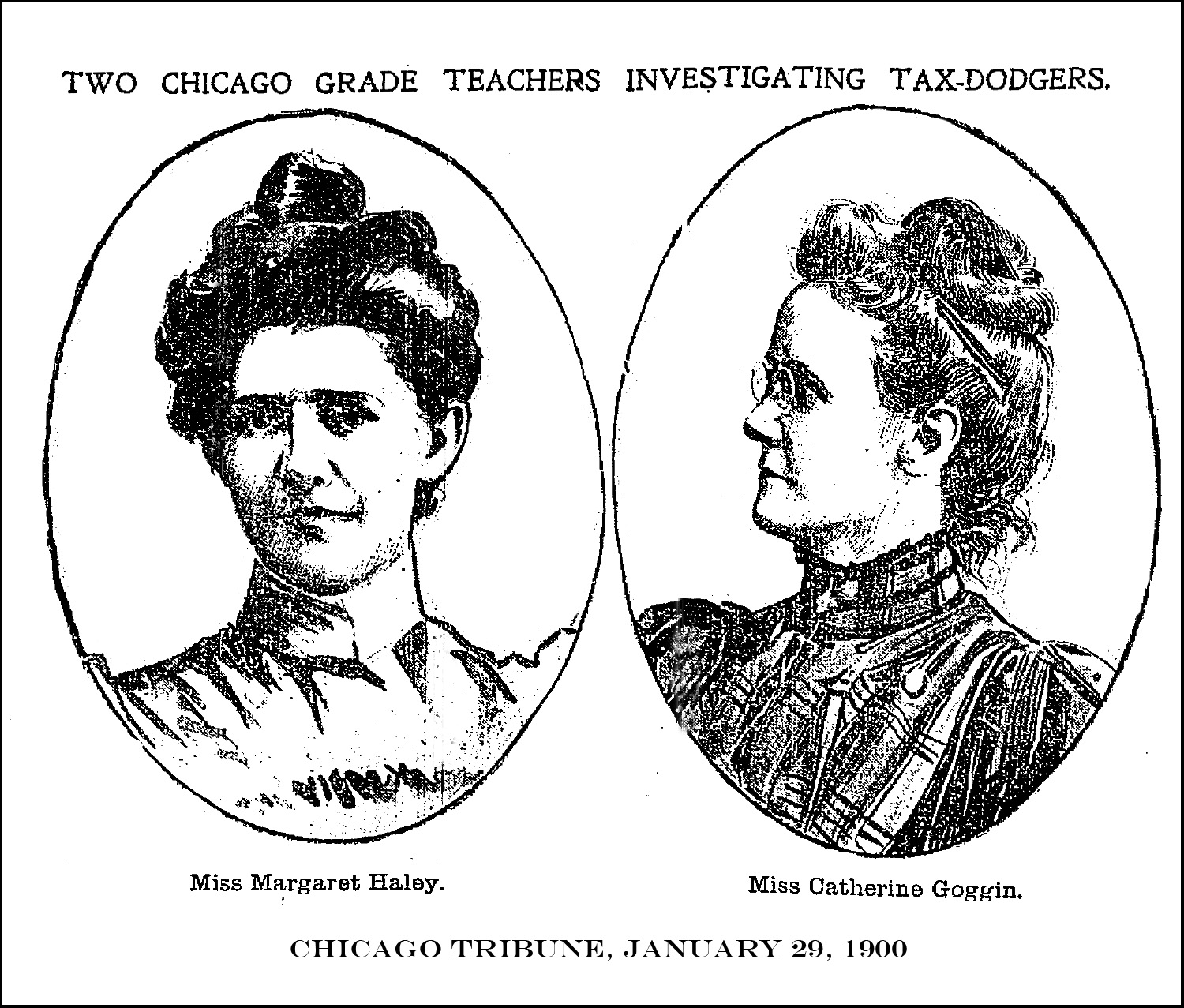
An illustration in the Chicago Tribune from January 29, 1900, depicts Margaret Haley and Catharine Goggin as key figures in the fight against corporate tax dodgers

In late 1899, Haley also joined the “tax fight” to ensure that the public schools received due funding, and to keep teachers from having to beg for salary increases and security of pay when the Board of Education pursued inequitable tax and lease policies. After the Harper Bill’s defeat, Haley and Catherine Goggin strengthened their rule over the CTF, thus purging any opposition within the union and making it one of the most prominent workers' organizations in America. Haley was hired as the CTF's permanent business representative in 1901 during her ongoing work investigating corporate tax evasion. Cook County tax records indicated that over 2 million dollars in corporate taxes had gone uncollected. Haley and Goggin advocated that money be put into the school system; after years of advocacy, $600,000 was collected and directed towards teacher raises.

During the time of the “tax battle,” 1900-1904, the Chicago Teachers’ Federation joined the Chicago Federation of Labor, headed by Margaret Haley’s friend John Fitzpatrick, which led the CTF to become Local 1 of the American Federation of Teachers. Historians debate to what degree labor accepted the teachers, and vice versa. The Chicago Board of Education used the teachers' affiliations with labor as a tool against them. During the 1915-1916 school year the Board of Education created the Loeb rule, which prohibited any alliance between teachers and organized labor. To make matters worse, the Board refused to rehire 68 teachers (38 of whom were members of the CTF) in the aftermath of the decision. The fight went before the Illinois Supreme Court, which ruled against the teachers. The CTF was required to disaffiliate with labor, and it continued as a quasi-legal organization until 1924.

The CTF also tied its fortunes to city politics; in 1905 it supported the mayoral bid of Edward Dunne. Like Haley, Dunne favored the municipal ownership of streetcar lines and the principle of popular control. During Dunne's first two-year stint as mayor the power of “administrative progressives” over teachers diminished. As part of Dunne's “Kitchen Cabinet”, Haley advised the mayor on school issues. Dunne appointed women and CTF supporters to the school board to ensure that business interests did not dominate school policies.

Haley took a stand at the national level. In 1901, three years before Haley became president of the National Federation of Teachers, she became the first elementary school teacher to speak before the National Education Association at the St. Louis convention. She presented the famous speech, “Why Teachers Should Organize”. She pushed for greater numbers of women in leadership roles at the local and national levels of teachers' unionization. She played in instrumental role in Ella Flagg Young’s election to president of the National Education Association in 1910, which then paid greater attention to the needs of classroom teachers

== Death and legacy ==
Margaret Haley died of a heart attack at Englewood Hospital in Chicago on January 5, 1939, aged 77.

== See also ==
- Chicago Teachers Union
- Chicago Public Schools
