= History of Chicago =

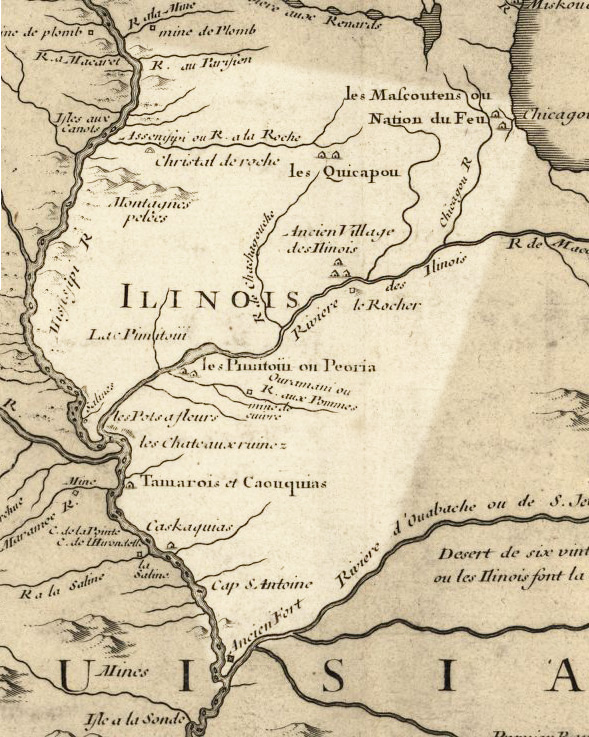
Site of Chicagou on the lake, in Guillaume de L'Isle's map (Paris, 1718)

Flag of Chicago

Historical Chicago homicide rate; a notable spike is visible in the Prohibition era, a sharp drop around World War II, another increase during the 1970s–90s, and a decline since then.

Chicago has played a central role in American economic, cultural and political history. Since the 1870s Chicago has been the largest and most dominant metropolis in the Midwestern United States. The recorded history begins with the arrival of French explorers, missionaries and fur traders in the late 17th century and their interaction with the local Potawatomi Native Americans. Jean Baptiste Point du Sable, a black freeman, by 1790 was the first permanent non-indigenous settler in the area. The small settlement was defended by Fort Dearborn after its completion in 1804, but was abandoned as part of the War of 1812 in expectation of an attack by the Potawatomi, who caught up with the retreating soldiers and civilians not two miles south of the fort. The modern city was incorporated in 1837 by Northern businessmen and grew rapidly from real estate speculation and the realization that it had a commanding position in the emerging inland transportation network, based on lake traffic and railroads, controlling access from the Great Lakes and the eastern states into the Mississippi River basin.

Despite a fire in 1871 that destroyed the Central Business District, the city grew exponentially, becoming the nation's rail center and the dominant Midwestern center for manufacturing, commerce, finance, higher education, religion, broadcasting, sports, jazz, and high culture. The city was a magnet for European immigrants—at first Germans, Irish and Scandinavians, then from the 1890s to 1914, Jews, Czechs, Poles and Italians. They were all absorbed in the city's powerful ward-based political machines. Many joined militant labor unions, and Chicago became notorious for its violent strikes, but respected for its high wages.

Large numbers of African Americans migrated from the South starting in the World War I era as part of the Great Migration. Mexicans started arriving after 1910, and Puerto Ricans after 1948. The Cook County suburbs grew rapidly after 1945, but the Democratic party machine kept both the city and suburbs under control, especially under mayor Richard J. Daley, who was chairman of the Cook County Democratic Party. Deindustrialization after 1970 closed the stockyards and most of the steel mills and factories, but the city retained its role as a financial and transportation hub. Increasingly it emphasized its service roles in medicine, higher education, and tourism. The city formed the political base for leaders such as Stephen A. Douglas in the 1850s, Adlai Stevenson in the 1950s, and Barack Obama in recent years.

== Pre-1830 ==
=== Early native settlements ===
At its first appearance in records by explorers, the Chicago area was inhabited by a number of Algonquian peoples, including the Mascouten and Miami. The name "Chicago" is generally believed to derive from a French rendering of the Miami–Illinois language word šikaakwa, referring to the plant Allium tricoccum, as well as the animal skunk. The first known reference to the site of the current city of Chicago as "Checagou" was by Robert de LaSalle around 1679 in a memoir. Henri Joutel, in his journal of 1688, noted that the wild garlic, called "chicagoua", grew abundantly in the area. According to his diary of late September 1687:

when we arrived at the said place called Chicagou which, according to what we were able to learn of it, has taken this name because of the quantity of garlic which grows in the forests in this region.

The tribe was part of the Miami Confederacy, which included the Illini and Kickapoo. In 1671, Potawatomi guides first took the French trader Nicolas Perrot to the Miami villages near the site of present-day Chicago. Pierre François Xavier de Charlevoix would write in 1721 that the Miami had a settlement in what is now Chicago around 1670. Chicago's location at a short canoe portage (the Chicago Portage) connecting the Great Lakes with the Mississippi River system attracted the attention of many French explorers, notably Louis Jolliet and Jacques Marquette in 1673. The Jesuit Relations indicate that by this time, the Iroquois tribes of New York had driven the Algonquian tribes entirely out of Lower Michigan and as far as this portage, during the later Beaver Wars.

René-Robert Cavelier, Sieur de La Salle, who traversed the Kankakee and Illinois Rivers south of Chicago in the winter of 1681–82, identified the Des Plaines River as the western boundary of the Miami. In 1683, La Salle built Fort St. Louis on the Illinois River. Almost two thousand Miami, including Weas and Piankeshaws, left the Chicago area to gather at the Grand Village of the Illinois, seeking French protection from the Iroquois. In 1696, French Jesuits led by Jean-François Buisson de Saint-Cosme built the Mission of the Guardian Angel to Christianize the local Wea and Miami people. Shortly thereafter, Augustin le Gardeur de Courtemanche visited the settlement on behalf of the French government, seeking peace between the Miami and Iroquois. Miami chief Chichikatalo accompanied de Courtemanche to Montreal.

The Algonquian tribes began to retake the lost territory in the ensuing decades, and in 1701, the Iroquois formally abandoned their claim to their "hunting grounds" as far as the portage to England in the Nanfan Treaty, which was finally ratified in 1726. This was largely a political maneuver of little practicality, as the English then had no presence in the region whatsoever, the French and their Algonquian allies being the dominant force in the area. A writer in 1718 noted that the Weas had a village in Chicago, but had recently fled due to concerns about approaching Ojibwes and Pottawatomis. The Iroquois and Meskwaki probably drove out all Miami from the Chicago area by the end of the 1720s. The Pottawatomi assumed control of the area, but probably did not have any major settlements in Chicago. French and allied use of the Chicago portage was mostly abandoned during the 1720s because of continual Native American raids during the Fox Wars.

There was also a Michigamea chief named Chicago who may have lived in the region. In the 1680s, the Illinois River was called the Chicago River.

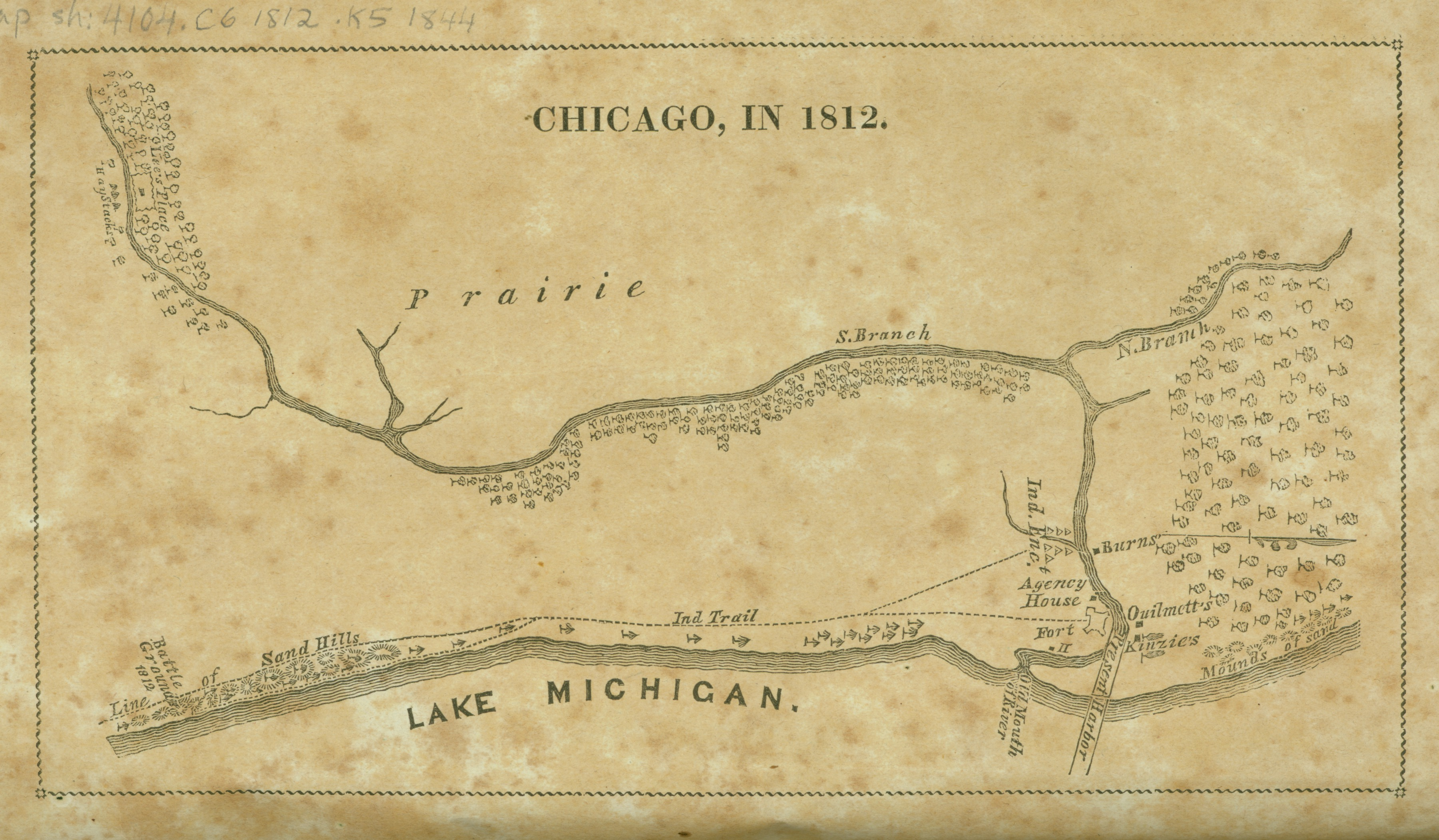
Retrospective map showing how Chicago may have appeared in 1812 (right is north, published in 1884)

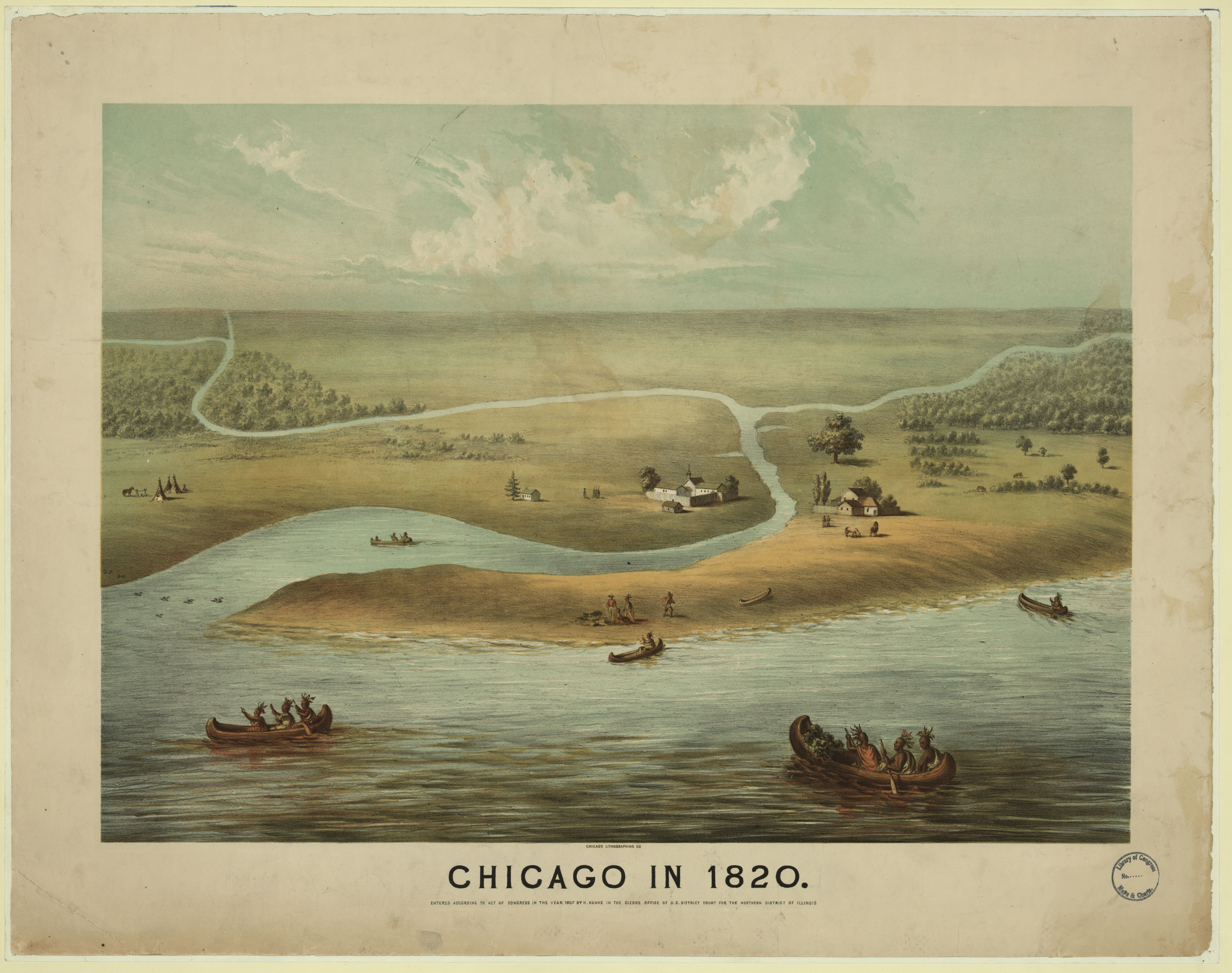
Chicago in 1820

=== First non-native settlements ===
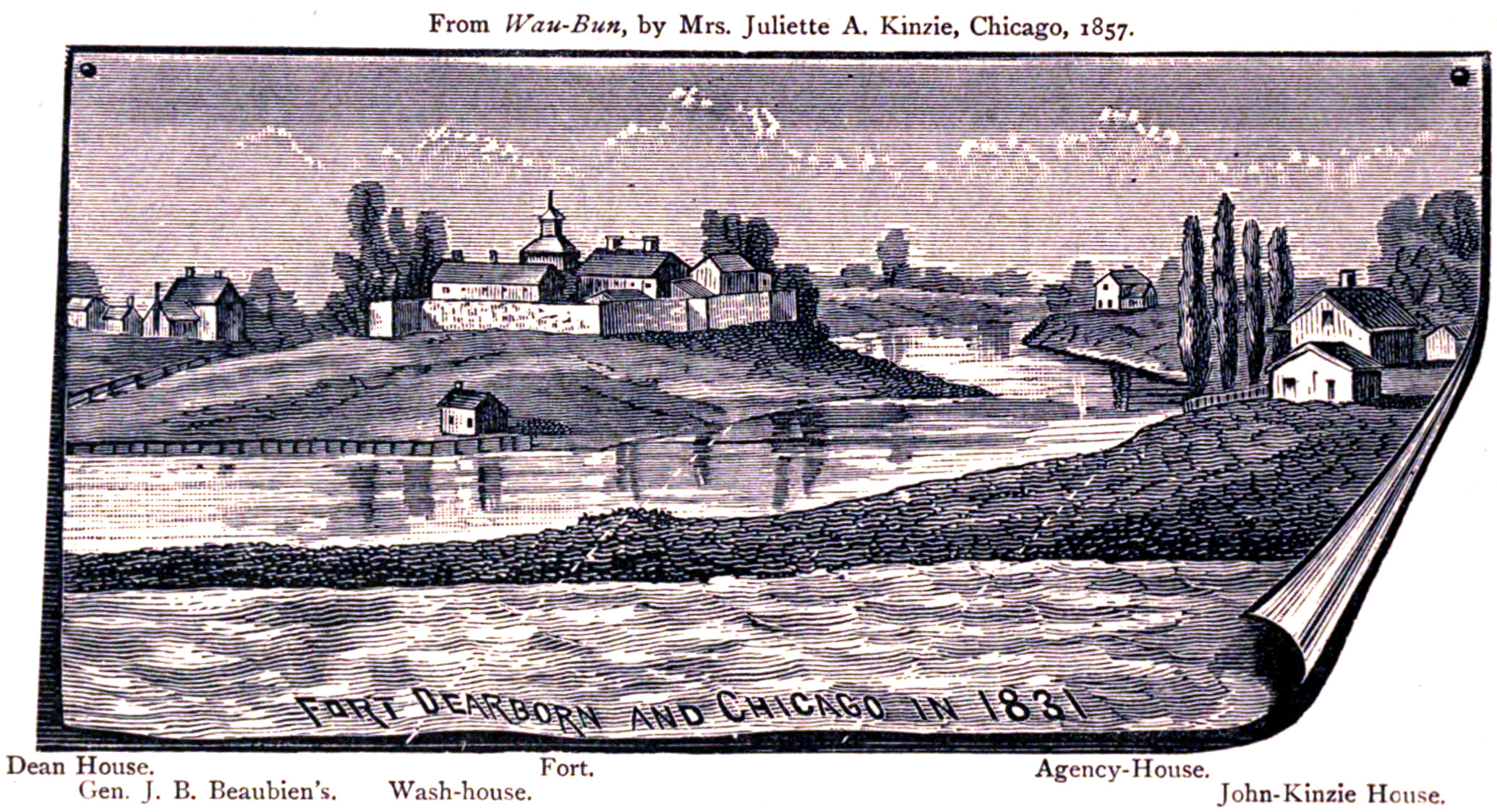
Fort Dearborn depicted as in 1831, sketched 1850s although the accuracy of the sketch was debated soon after it appeared.

The first non-native settler in Chicago was Jean Baptiste Point du Sable, a Frenchman of European and African descent, who built a farm at the mouth of the Chicago River in 1788 to 1790. (Note: exact date unknown) He left Chicago in 1800. In 1968, Point du Sable was honored at Pioneer Court as the city's founder and featured as a symbol.

In 1795, following the Northwest Indian War, some Native Americans ceded the area of Chicago to the United States for a military post in the Treaty of Greenville. The US built Fort Dearborn in 1803 on the Chicago River. It was destroyed by Indian forces during the War of 1812 in the Battle of Fort Dearborn, and many of the inhabitants were killed or taken prisoner. The fort had been ordered to evacuate. During the evacuation soldiers and civilians were overtaken near what is today Prairie Avenue. After the end of the war, the Potawatomi ceded the land to the United States in the 1816 Treaty of St. Louis. (Today, this treaty is commemorated in Indian Boundary Park.) Fort Dearborn was rebuilt in 1818 and used until 1837.

== Growth of the city ==
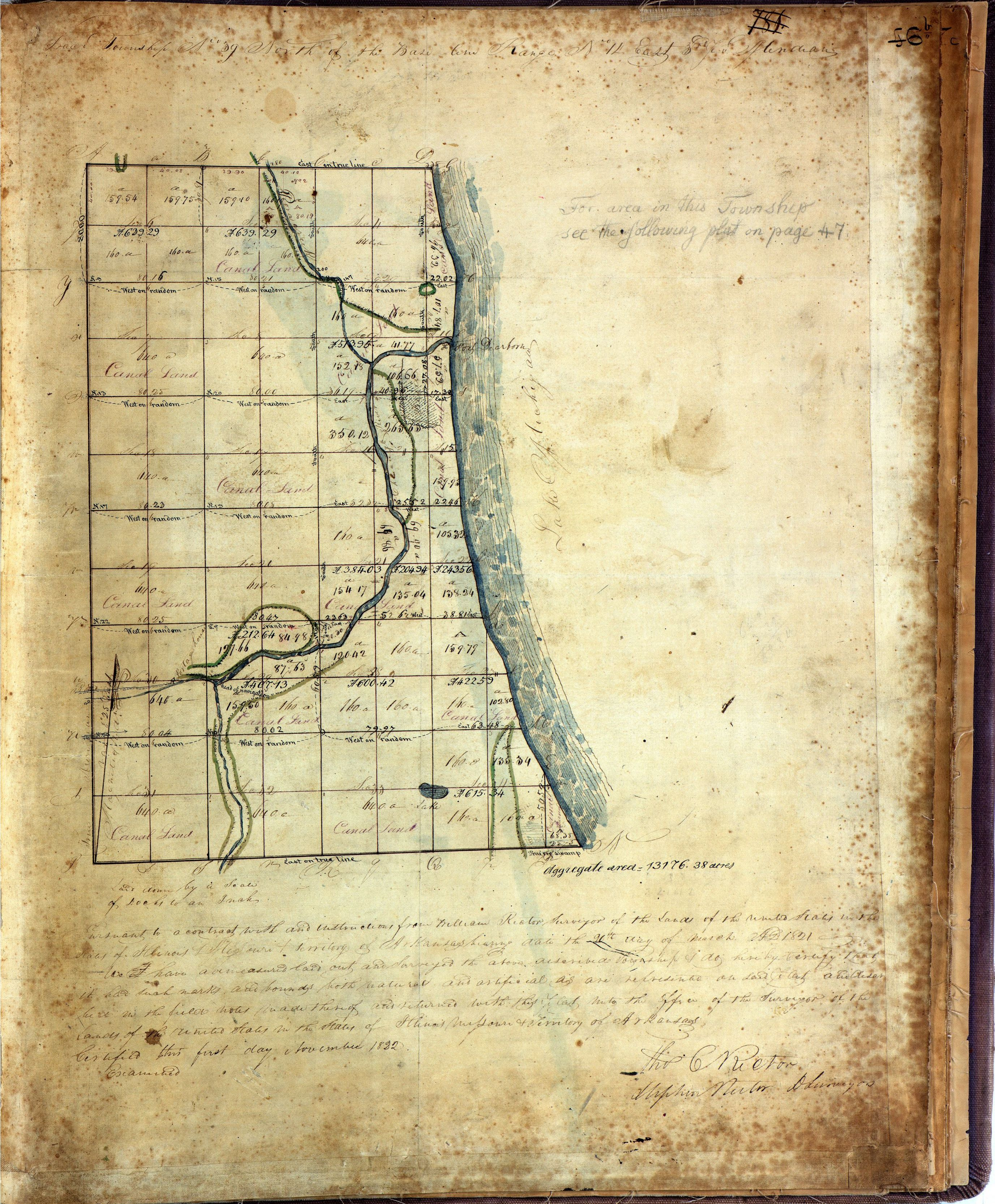
1821 Survey of Chicago

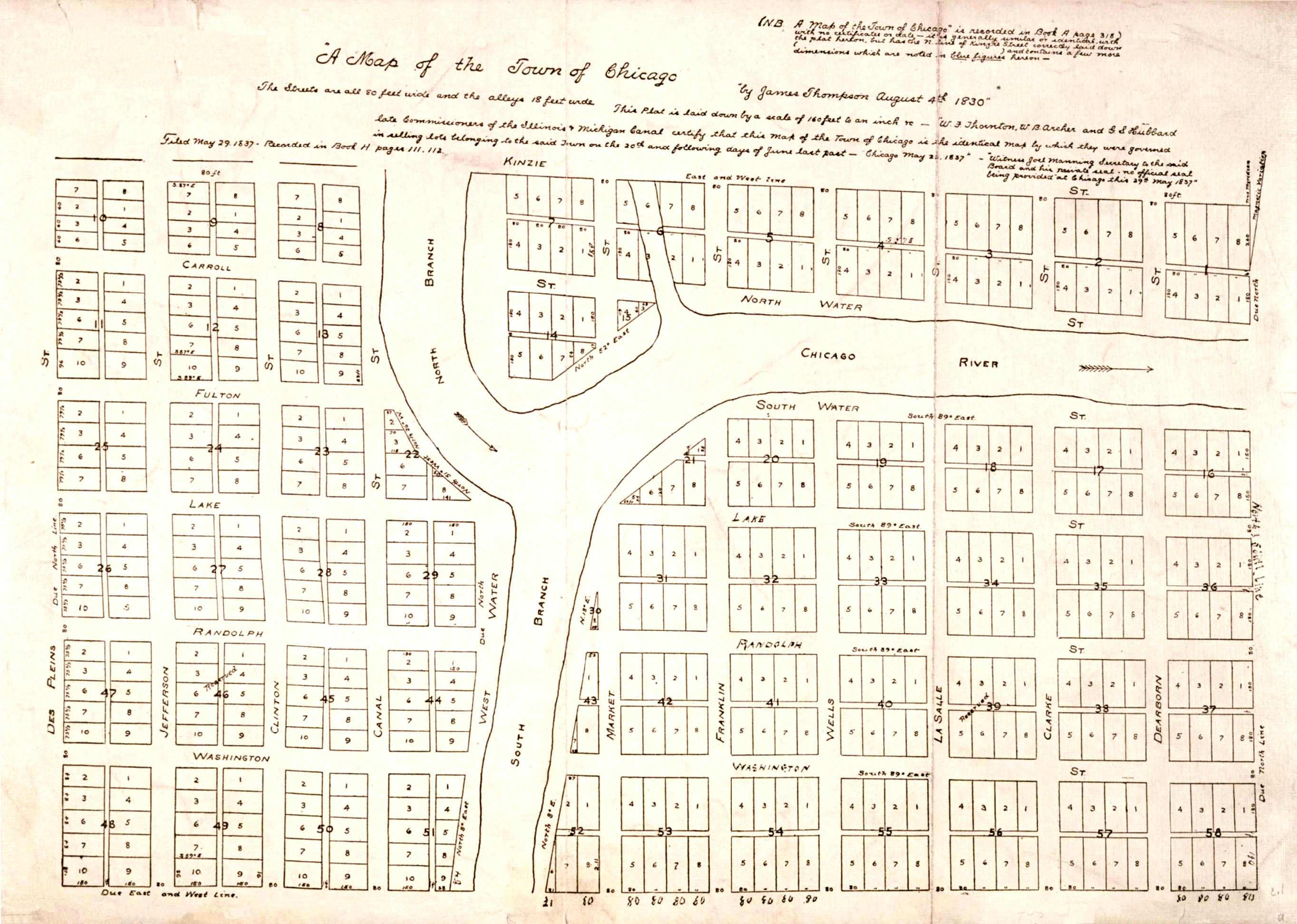
Thompson's plat, the first official map of what would become the City of Chicago

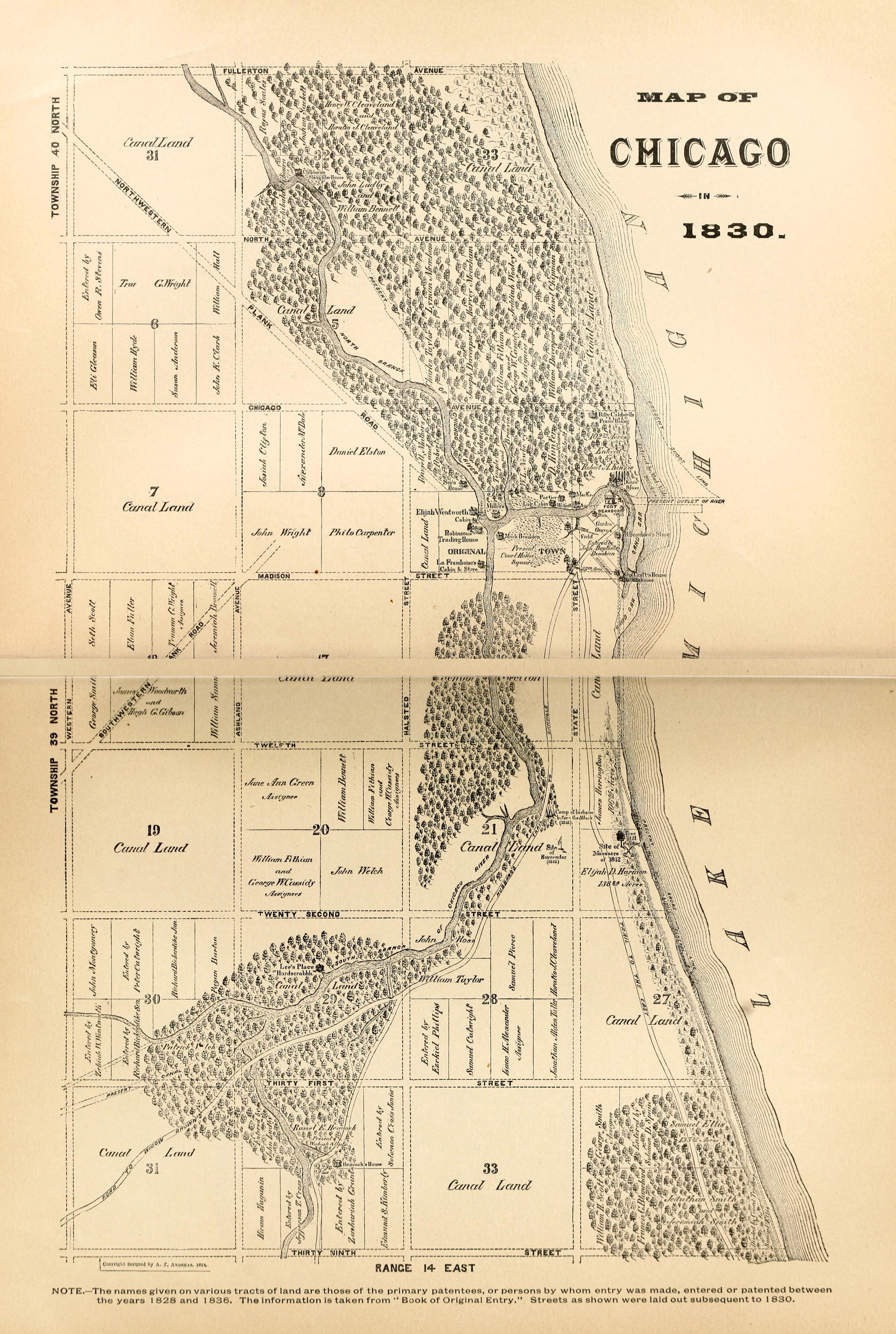
Chicago in 1830, as depicted in 1884

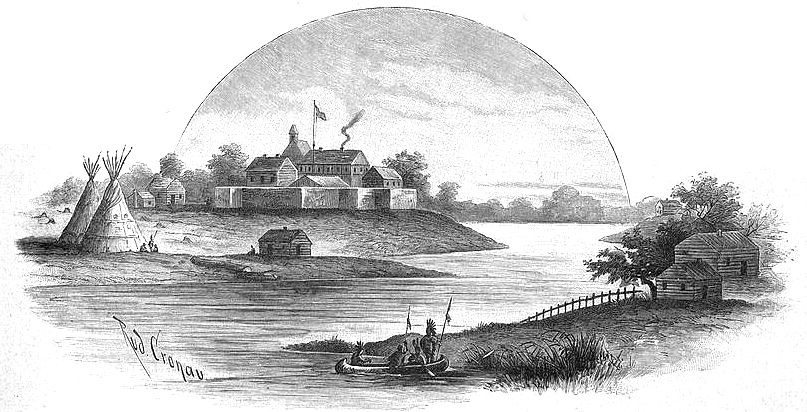
Chicago in 1831, as depicted in 1893 by Rudolf Cronau

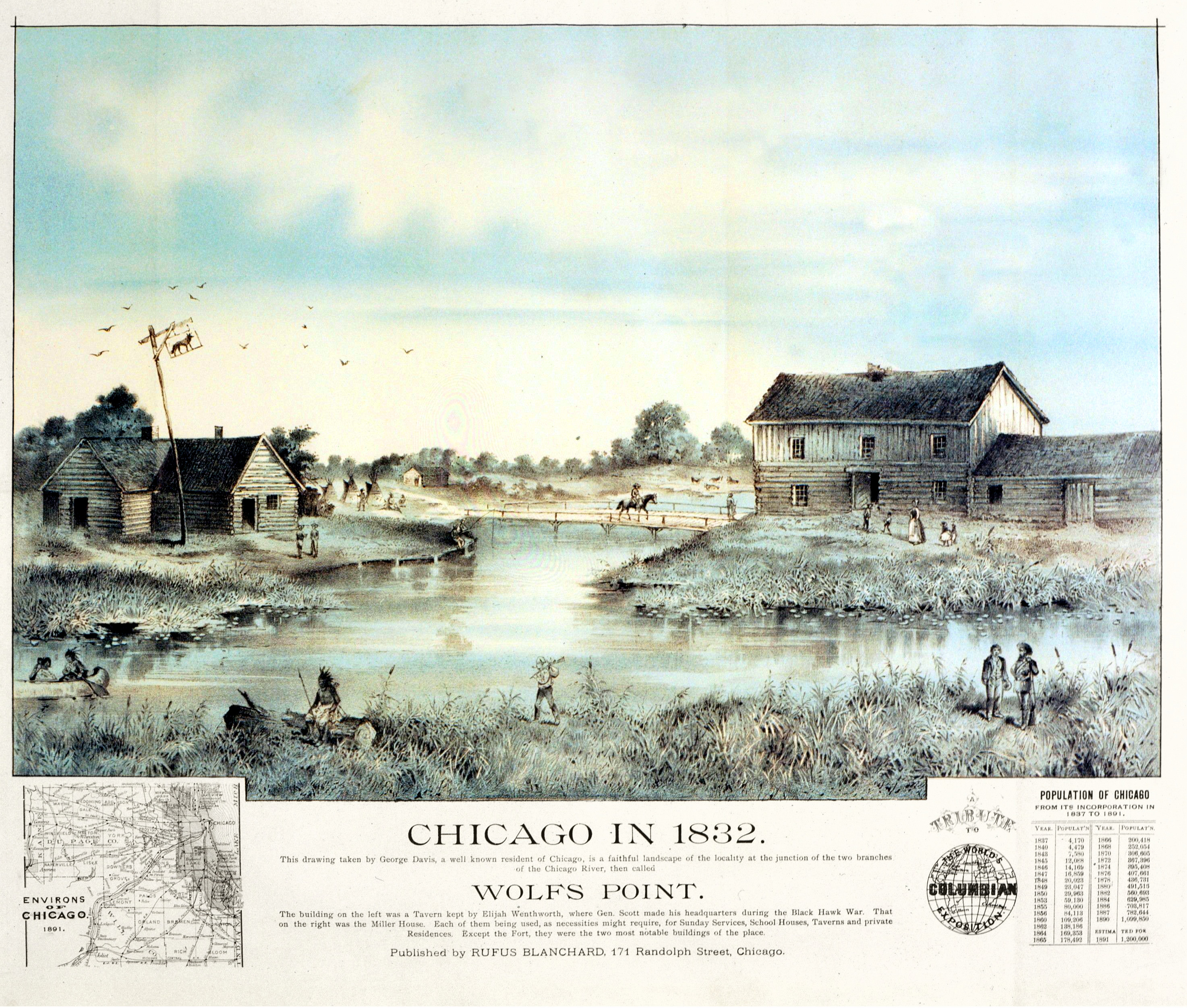
Chicago in 1832, as depicted in 1892

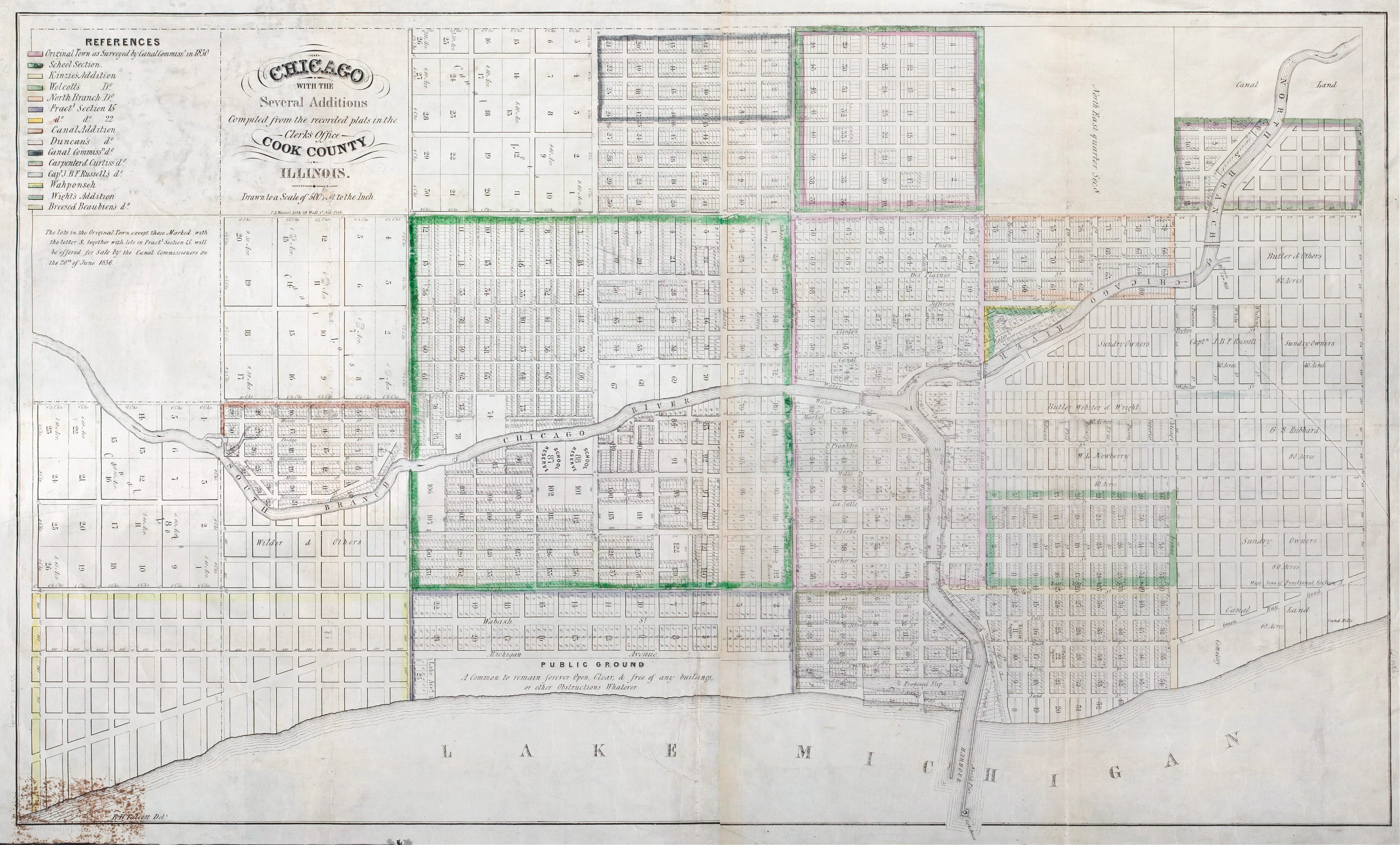
Chicago in 1836

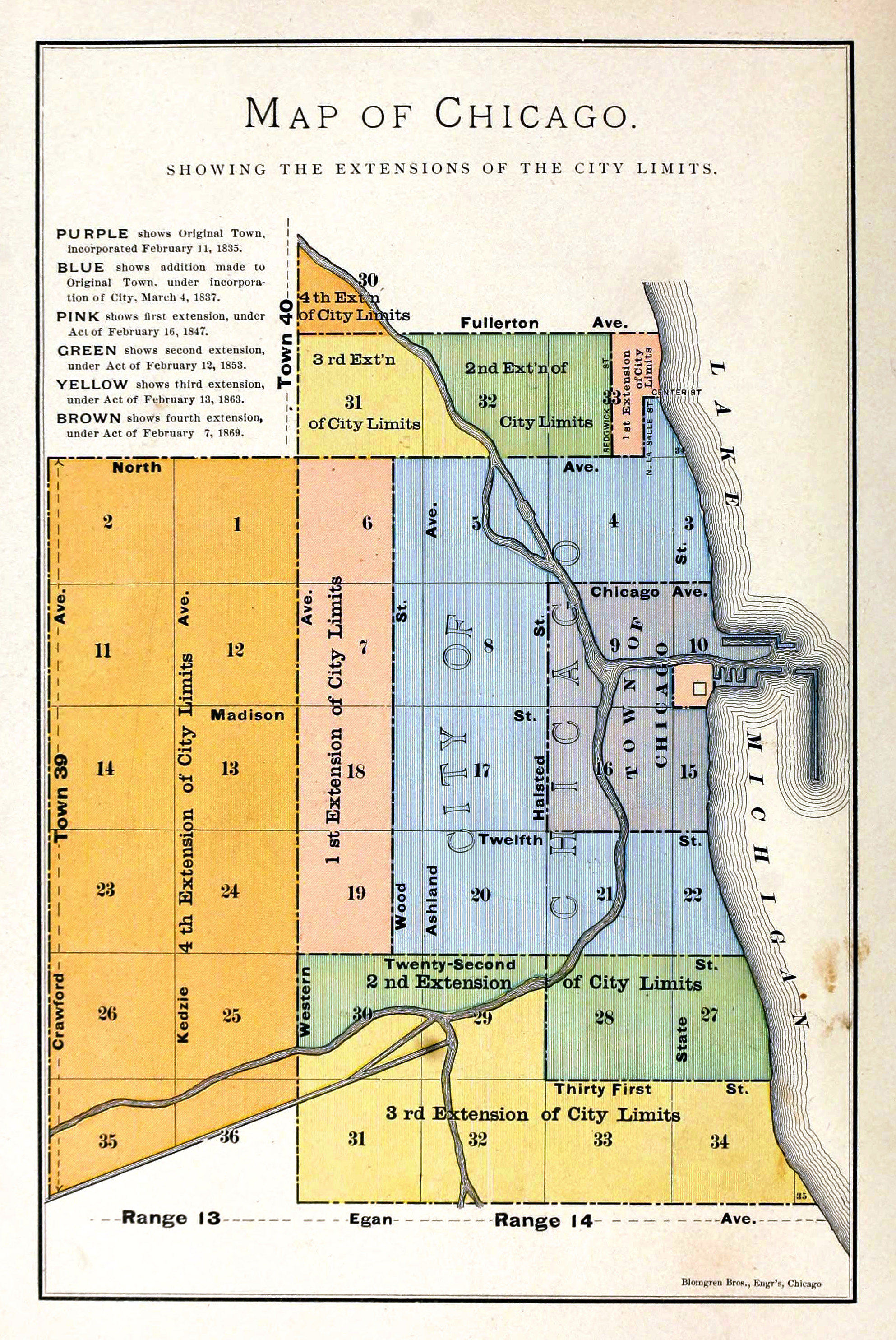
Extensions to city limits through 1884

In 1829, the Illinois legislature appointed commissioners to locate a canal and lay out the surrounding town. The commissioners employed James Thompson to survey and plat the town of Chicago, which at the time had a population of less than 100. Historians regard the August 4, 1830, filing of the plat as the official recognition of a location known as Chicago.

Yankee entrepreneurs saw the potential of Chicago as a transportation hub in the 1830s and engaged in land speculation to obtain the choicest lots. On August 12, 1833, the Town of Chicago was incorporated with a population of 350. The Chippewa, Odawa and Potawatomi ceded land in Illinois, Wisconsin and Michigan in the 1833 Treaty of Chicago and were forced to move west of the Mississippi River by 1838. On July 12, 1834, the Illinois from Sackets Harbor, New York, was the first commercial schooner to enter the harbor, a sign of the Great Lakes trade that would benefit both Chicago and New York state. Chicago was granted a city charter by the State of Illinois on March 4, 1837; it was part of the larger Cook County. By 1840 the boom town had a population of over 4,000.

After 1830, the rich farmlands of northern Illinois attracted Yankee settlers. Yankee real estate operators created a city overnight in the 1830s. To open the surrounding farmlands to trade, the Cook County commissioners built roads south and west. The latter crossed the "dismal Nine-mile Swamp," the Des Plaines River, and went southwest to Walker's Grove, now the Village of Plainfield. The roads enabled hundreds of wagons per day of farm produce to arrive and so the entrepreneurs built grain elevators and docks to load ships bound for points east through the Great Lakes. Produce was shipped through the Erie Canal and down the Hudson River to New York City; the growth of the Midwest farms expanded New York City as a port.

In 1837, Chicago held its first mayoral election and elected William B. Ogden as its inaugural mayor.

=== Emergence as a transportation hub ===
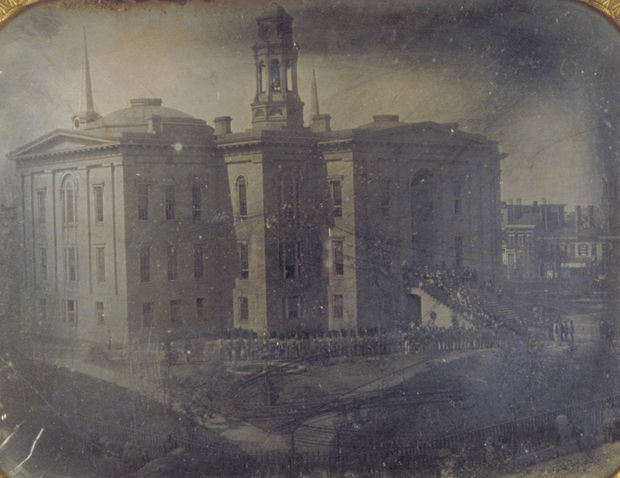
An 1855 daguerreotype attributed to Alexander Hesler of the Cook County Court House and City Hall. Believed to be the oldest surviving photograph taken of a structure in Chicago.

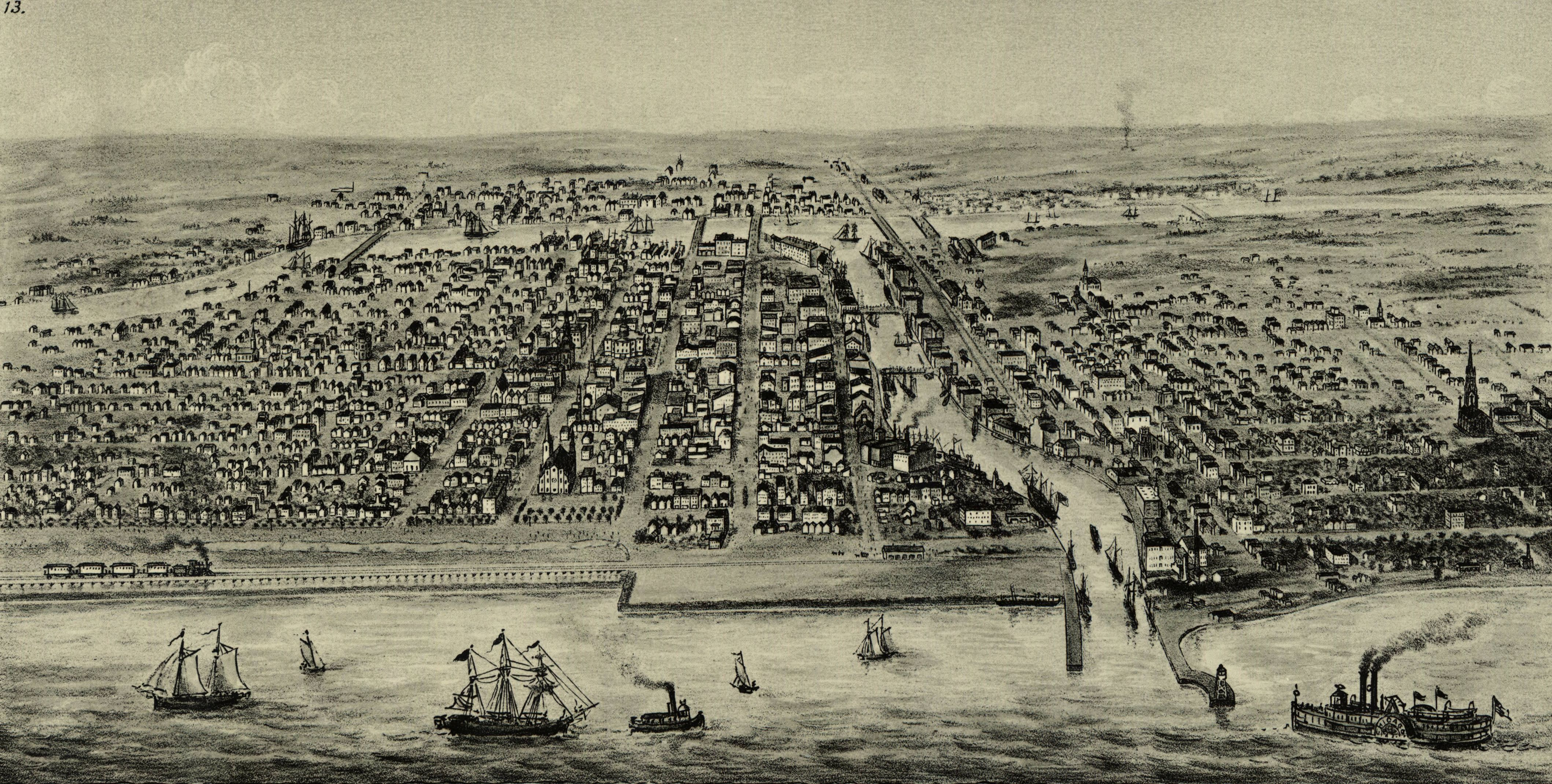
1853 Bird's eye view of Chicago

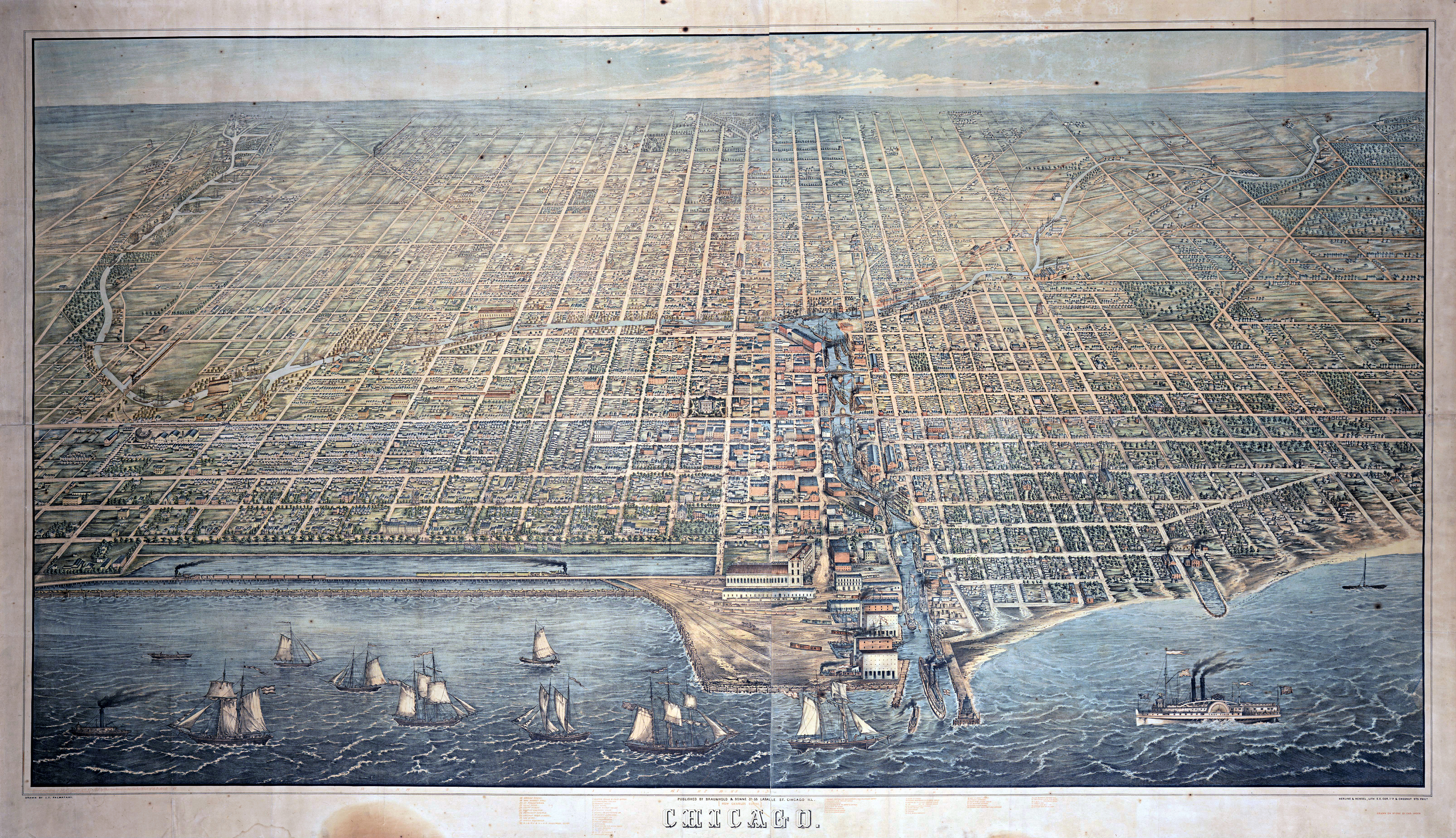
1857 Bird's eye view of Chicago

In 1848, the opening of the Illinois and Michigan Canal allowed shipping from the Great Lakes through Chicago to the Mississippi River and the Gulf of Mexico. The first rail line to Chicago, the Galena & Chicago Union Railroad, was completed the same year. Chicago would go on to become the transportation hub of the United States, with its road, rail, water, and later air connections. Chicago also became home to national retailers offering catalog shopping such as Montgomery Ward and Sears, Roebuck and Company, which used the transportation lines to ship all over the nation.

By the 1850s, the construction of railroads made Chicago a major hub and over 30 lines entered the city. The main lines from the East ended in Chicago, and those oriented to the West began in Chicago and so by 1860, the city had become the nation's trans-shipment and warehousing center. Factories were created, most famously the harvester factory that was opened in 1847 by Cyrus Hall McCormick. It was a processing center for natural resource commodities extracted in the West. The Wisconsin forests supported the millwork and lumber business; the Illinois hinterland provided the wheat. Hundreds of thousands of hogs and cattle were shipped to Chicago for slaughter, preserved in salt, and transported to eastern markets. By 1870, refrigerated cars allowed the shipping of fresh meat to cities in the East.

The prairie bog nature of the area provided a fertile ground for disease-carrying insects. In springtime, Chicago was so muddy from the high water that horses could scarcely move. Comical signs proclaiming "Fastest route to China" or "No Bottom Here" were placed to warn people of the mud.

Travelers reported Chicago was the filthiest city in America. The city created a massive sewer system. In the first phase, sewage pipes were laid across the city above ground and used gravity to move the waste. The city was built in a low-lying area subject to flooding. In 1856, the city council decided that the entire city should be elevated four to five feet by using a newly available jacking-up process. In one instance, the five-story Brigg's Hotel, weighing 22,000 tons, was lifted while it continued to operate. Observing that such a thing could never have happened in Europe, the British historian Paul Johnson cites the astounding feat as a dramatic example of American determination and ingenuity based on the conviction that anything material is possible.

=== Immigration and population in 19th century ===
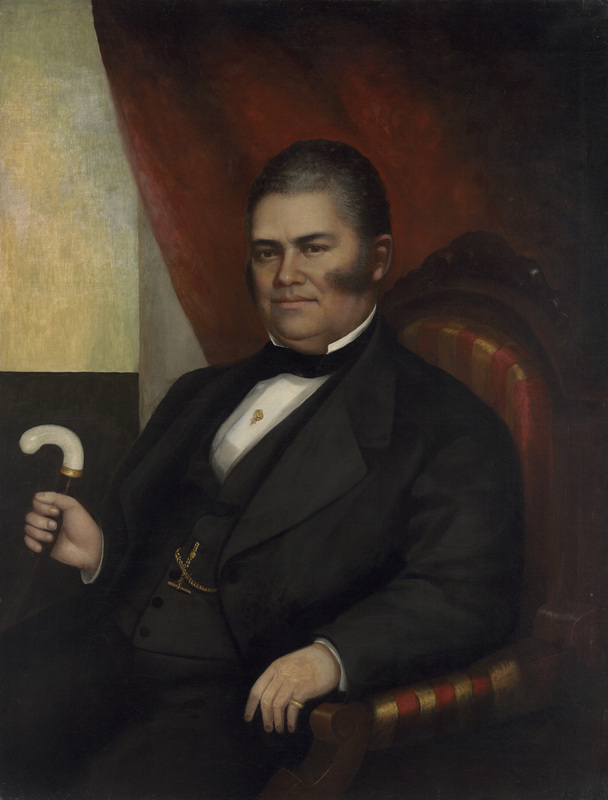
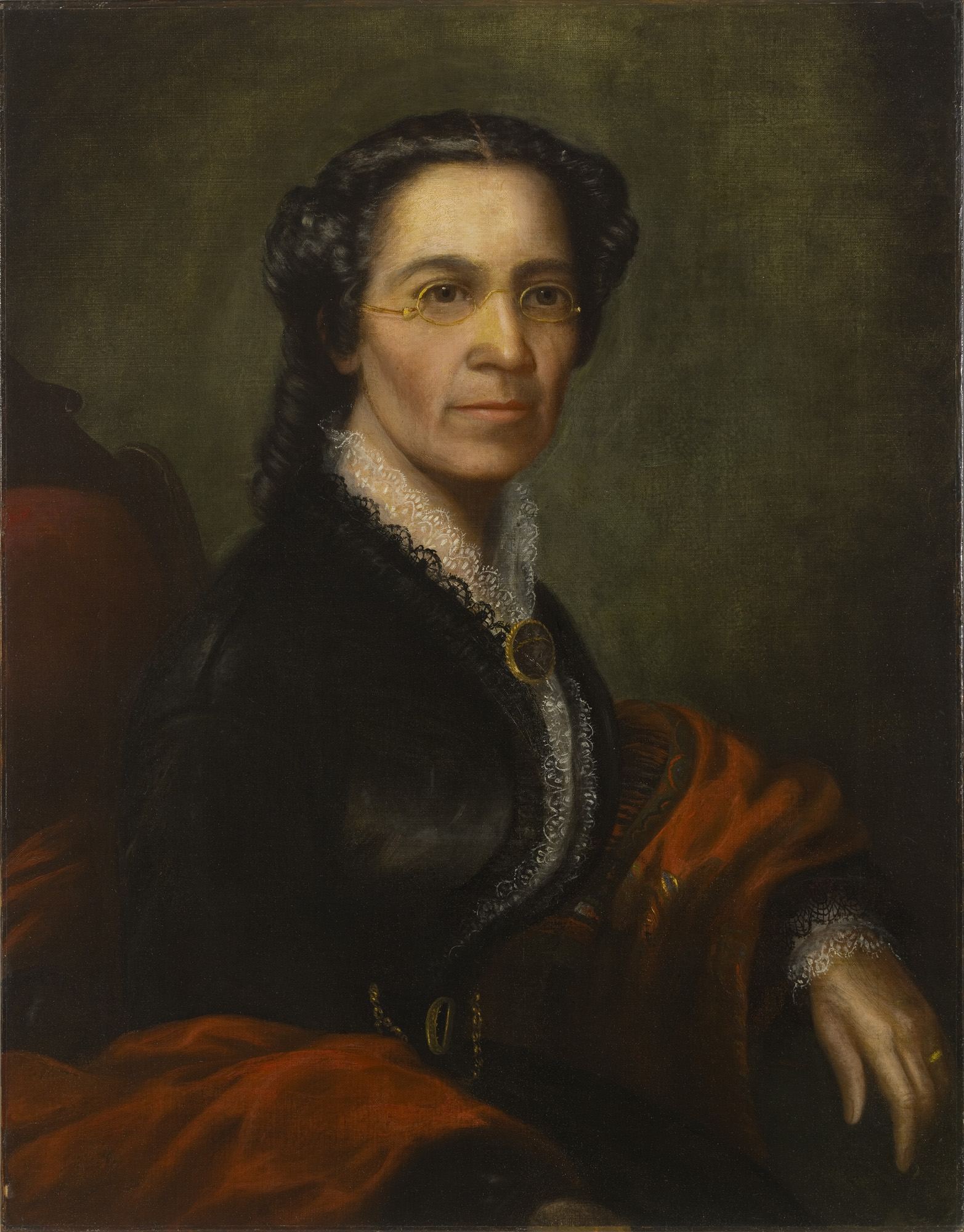
Husband and wife John and Mary Jones were among the most prominent early African-American citizens of Chicago.

A bird's-eye view of Chicago in 1898. It became the second American city to reach a population of 1.6 million.

Chicago - State St at Madison Street, 1897

Although originally settled by Yankees in the 1830s, the city in the 1840s had many Irish Catholics come as a result of the Great Famine. Later in the century, the railroads, stockyards, and other heavy industry of the late 19th century attracted a variety of skilled workers from Europe, especially Germans, English, Swedes, Norwegians, and Dutch. A small African-American community formed, led by activist leaders like John Jones and Mary Richardson Jones, who established Chicago as a stop on the Underground Railroad.

In 1840, Chicago was the 92nd city in the United States by population. Its population grew so rapidly that 20 years later, it was the ninth city. In the pivotal year of 1848, Chicago saw the completion of the Illinois and Michigan Canal, its first steam locomotives, the introduction of steam-powered grain elevators, the arrival of the telegraph, and the founding of the Chicago Board of Trade. By 1857, Chicago was the largest city in what was then called the Northwest. In 20 years, Chicago grew from 4,000 people to over 90,000. Chicago surpassed St. Louis and Cincinnati as the major city in the West and gained political notice as the home of Stephen Douglas, the 1860 presidential nominee of the Northern Democrats. The 1860 Republican National Convention in Chicago nominated the home-state candidate Abraham Lincoln.

Many of the newcomers were Irish Catholic and German immigrants. Their neighborhood saloons, a center of male social life, were attacked in the mid-1850s by the local Know-Nothing Party, which drew its strength from evangelical Protestants. The new party was anti-immigration and anti-liquor and called for the purification of politics by reducing the power of the saloonkeepers. In 1855, the Know-Nothings elected Levi Boone mayor, who banned Sunday sales of liquor and beer. His aggressive law enforcement sparked the Lager Beer Riot of April 1855, which erupted outside a courthouse in which eight Germans were being tried for liquor ordinance violations. After 1865, saloons became community centers only for local ethnic men, as reformers saw them as places that incited riotous behavior and moral decay. Saloons were also sources of musical entertainment. Francis O'Neill, an Irish immigrant who later became police chief, published compendiums of Irish music that were largely collected from other newcomers playing in saloons.

By 1870, Chicago had grown to become the nation's second-largest city and one of the largest cities in the world. Between 1870 and 1900, Chicago grew from a city of 299,000 to nearly 1.7 million and was the fastest-growing city in world history. Chicago's flourishing economy attracted huge numbers of new immigrants from Eastern and Central Europe, especially Jews, Poles, and Italians, along with many smaller groups. Many businesspeople and professionals arrived from the eastern states. Relatively few new arrivals came from Chicago's rural hinterland. The exponential growth put increasing pollution on the environment, as hazards to public health impacted everyone.

=== Fighting the Civil War 1861-1865 ===
The Civil War (1861–1865) was a crucial event in the development of Chicago. The city's government, businesses, voluntary societies, and patriotic families gave massive support to the war effort, while the national government provided heavy funding.

By 1861 the city's commercial infrastructure and water and rail links had advanced enough to support rapid industrialization funded by the national war effort. By 1860 traffic on Lake Michigan made Chicago one of the busiest ports in the Western Hemisphere. In the 1850s the Congress dedided to promote railroads by giving them land grants. The Illinois Central Railroad was the first to be established. Banks loaned it the $27 million needed for construction and by 1860 it operated 705 miles of track criss-crossing Illinois from Chicago to Galena to Cairo. It was the longest railway in the world. It set up a depot every ten miles, where ambitious men rushed in to start a town by buying plots from the land grant. In the decade of the 1850s, the national railway grid was expanding rapidly from 9,000 miles of track to 31,000. Outside the Midwest, rail mileage tripled, but inside the region it expanded by a factor of 7 from 1,300 to 9,000 miles. Chicago thereby became the world's greatest rail center. Much of the necessary iron and steel was imported from Pittsburgh, but new mills were Increasingly set up in Chicago. When the war broke out in 1861, Chicago's main rivals Cincinnati and St Louis lost access to their primary markets to the South. Chicago replaced them as the hub for the national distribution of wheat and meat. Furthermore, Chicago became the supply base for the Western armies, as General Ulysses S Grant took his forces on the Illinois Central down to Cairo. It was his supply base as he marched south to seize control of Kentucky and Tennessee on his way to victories at Shiloh, Vicksburg, and Chattanooga.

The opening of the Union Stock Yard clinched Chicago's new dominant role for beef and pork as farmers across the hinterland shipped their cattle and hogs by rail. Hundreds of small factories opened in Chicago to provide Union forces with urgently needed supplies from uniforms to wagons. Between 1860 and 1870 factory employment in Cook County exploded from 5,400 to 31,000, while the city's population tripled from 112,000 people to 299,000.

All the new business necessitated expanded banking facilities. Thanks to new federal laws creating the national banking system, local financiers opened 13 national banks in the city in 1863 to 1865. Leadership came from the First National Bank of Chicago which not only served local business but also serviced accounts for 80 new national banks in 15 states. Chicago's big banks dominated the west in the same way New York's Wall Street dominated the rest of the nation's finance.

Criticism of the war appeared in Chicago as well as downstate. The Chicago Times under Wilbur F. Storey was the nation's most strident Copperhead critic of Republican Lincoln and his emancipation program. In June 1863, General Ambrose E. Burnside sent Army troops to close the newspaper. It was the leading Democratic newspaper in a Democratic city and protests were vehement, so Lincoln reversed the suppression. Some 26,000 Confederate prisoners were sent to Camp Douglas on the South Side; 4,500 of them died of disease due to deliberately inadequate sanitation and poor medical facilities.

Patriotic women mobilized to help needy Union soldiers and their families. Among them were Chicagoans Mary Livermore and Jane Hoge, who organized two large Northwest Sanitary Fairs in 1863 and 1865 to raise money. Thousands of women volunteered to nurse wounded soldiers at hospitals behind the front. The male doctors were highly dubious about this spontaneous sort of unorganized help. The convalescents were appreciative; as sick civilians they rarely had been hospitalized and instead depended on care at home by mothers, sisters and wives. Most famous of all was Mother Bickerdyke who was highly visible at military hospitals in Grant's army. Back in Chicago she campaigned energetically to raise money and clothing, and tell families how their sons were really being cared for. The doctors, however did very much appreciate the very well organized Catholic sisters. They were already operating their own hospitals and they sent well-trained cadres to assist doctors in military hospitals. The Sisters of Mercy based in Chicago worked on a floating hospital on the Mississippi River, and they took charge of a new hospital on shore.

Cook County and neighboring counties sent 36,000 men to war. The draft was unpopular but was seldom needed because the city paid irresistible cash bounties for men who volunteered. About four thousand Chicago soldiers died in the War. Pride in their heroism became memorialized in the tall statues standing guard over city parks named after Grant and Lincoln.

=== Gilded Age ===
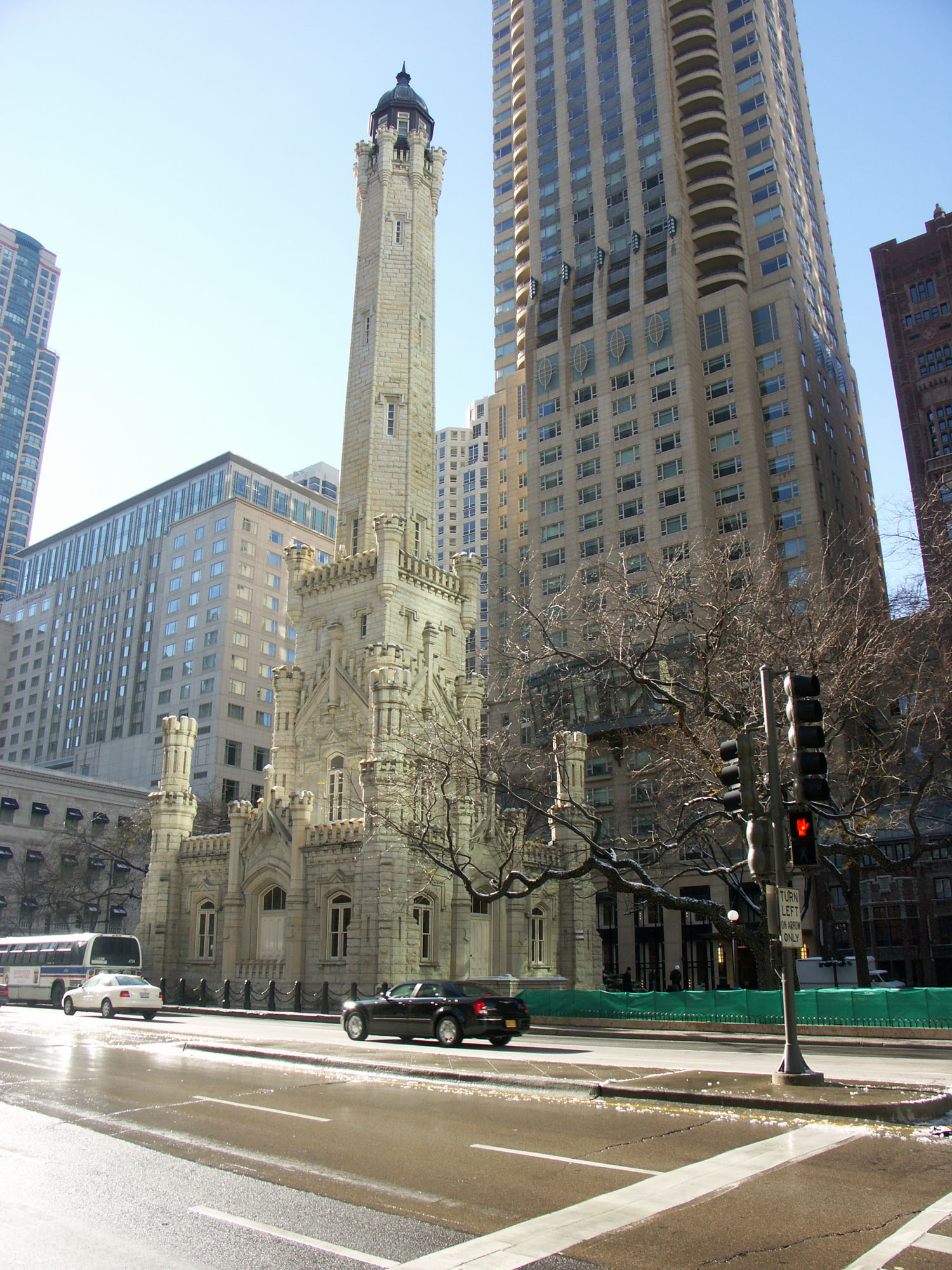
The Chicago Water Tower, preserved as one of the few surviving structures after the Great Chicago Fire of 1871.

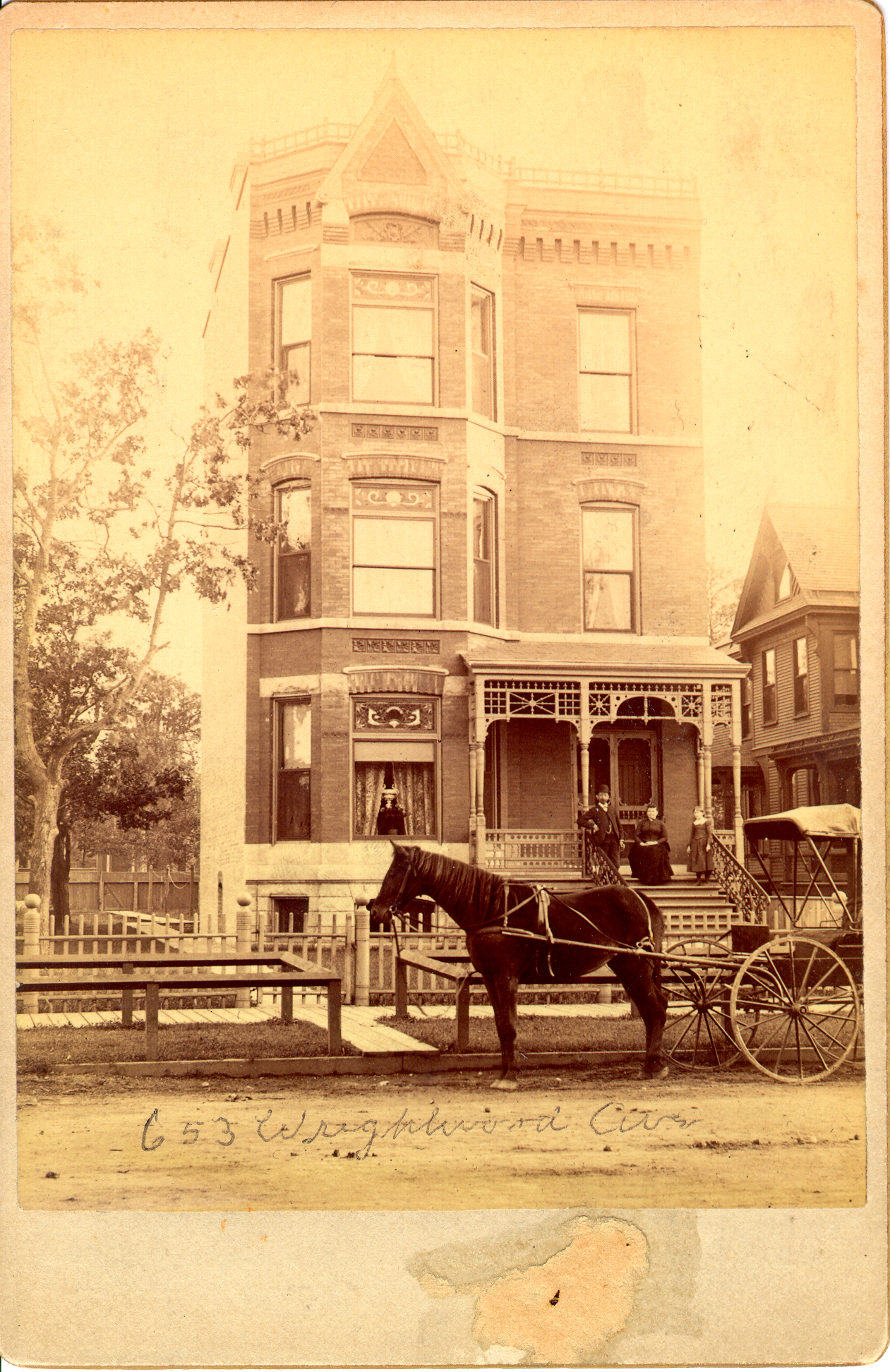
A residential building in Chicago's Lincoln Park in 1885, when the city had dirt roads and wooden sidewalks.

Most of the city burned in the 1871 Great Chicago Fire. The damage from the fire was immense since 300 people died, 18,000 buildings were destroyed, and nearly 100,000 of the city's 300,000 residents were left homeless. Several key factors exacerbated the spread of the fire. Most of Chicago's buildings and sidewalks were then constructed of wood. Also, the lack of attention to proper waste disposal practices, which was sometimes deliberate to favor certain industries, left an abundance of flammable pollutants in the Chicago River along which the fire spread from the south to the north.

Developers and citizens began immediate reconstruction on the existing Jeffersonian grid. The building boom that followed saved the city's status as the transportation and trade hub of the Midwest. Massive reconstruction using the newest materials and methods catapulted Chicago into its status as a city on par with New York and became the birthplace of modern architecture in the United States. The fire led to the incorporation of stringent fire-safety codes, which included a strong preference for masonry construction.

The Danish immigrant Jens Jensen arrived in 1886 and soon became a successful and celebrated landscape designer. Jensen's work was characterized by a democratic approach to landscaping, which was informed by his interest in social justice and conservation, and a rejection of antidemocratic formalism. Among Jensen's creations were four Chicago city parks, most famously Columbus Park. His work also included garden design for some of the region's most influential millionaires.

The World's Columbian Exposition of 1893 was constructed on former wetlands at the present location of Jackson Park along Lake Michigan in Chicago's Hyde Park neighborhood. The land was reclaimed according to a design by the landscape architect Frederick Law Olmsted. The temporary pavilions, which followed a classical theme, were designed by a committee of the city's architects under the direction of Daniel Burnham. It was called the "White City" for the appearance of its buildings. The Exposition drew 27 million visitors and is among the most influential world's fairs in history. It affected art, architecture, and design throughout the nation. The classical architectural style contributed to a revival of Beaux Arts architecture that borrowed from historical styles. It featured the first and until recently the largest Ferris wheel ever built.

The soft, swampy ground near the lake proved unstable ground for tall masonry buildings. That was an early constraint, but builders developed the innovative use of steel framing for support and invented the skyscraper in Chicago, which became a leader in modern architecture and set the model nationwide for achieving vertical city densities.

=== Haymarket affair 1886 ===
Polarized attitudes of labor and business in Chicago prompted a strike by workers' lobbying for an eight-hour work day. A peaceful demonstration on May 4, 1886, at Haymarket near the west side was interrupted by a bomb thrown at police; seven police officers were killed. Widespread violence broke out. A group of anarchists were tried for inciting the riot and convicted. Several were hanged and others were pardoned. The episode was a watershed moment in the labor movement, and its history was commemorated in the annual May Day celebrations.

1893 Bird's eye view of Chicago

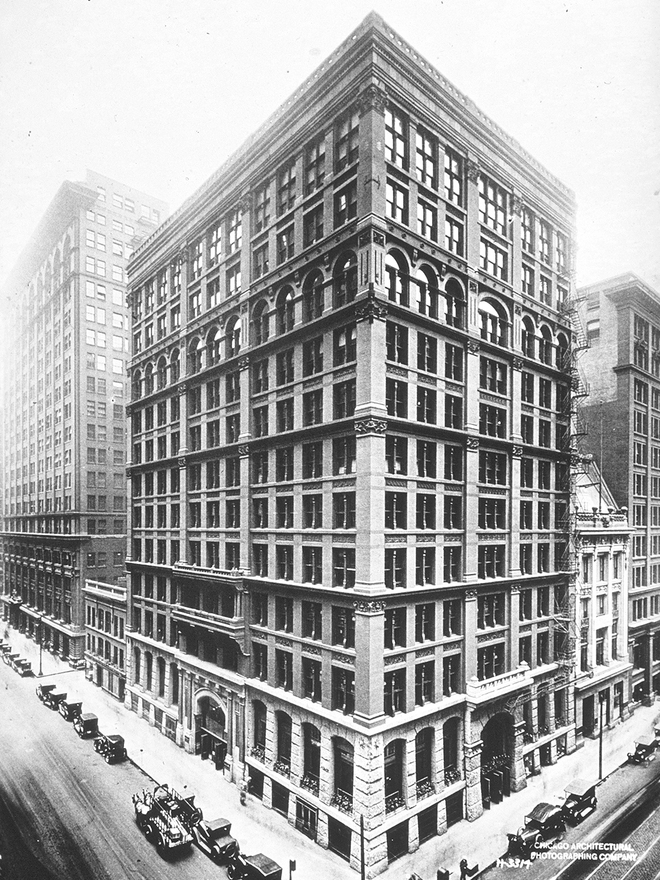
The Home Insurance Building in Chicago, the world's first skyscraper in 1885.

=== Gambling ===
In Chicago, like other rapidly growing industrial centers with large immigrant working-class neighborhoods, gambling was a major issue. The city's elite upper-class had private clubs and closely supervised horse racing tracks. The middle-class reformers like Jane Addams focused on the workers, who had discovered freedom and independence in gambling. It was a world apart from their closely supervised factory jobs and they gambled to validate risk-taking aspect of masculinity, betting heavily on dice, card games, policy, and cock fights. By the 1850s, hundreds of saloons had offered gambling opportunities, including off-track betting on the horses. The historian Mark Holler argues that organized crime provided upward mobility to ambitious ethnics. The high-income, high-visibility vice lords, and racketeers built their careers and profits in ghetto neighborhoods and often branched into local politics to protect their domains. For example, in 1868 to 1888, Michael C. McDonald, "The Gambler King of Clark Street," kept numerous Democratic machine politicians in his city on expense account to protect his gambling empire and to keep the goo-goo reformers at bay.

In large cities, illegal businesses like gambling and prostitution were typically contained in the geographically segregated red light districts. The businessowners made regularly scheduled payments to police and politicians, which they treated as licensing expenses. The informal rates became standardized. For example, in Chicago, they ranged from $20 a month for a cheap brothel to $1000 a month for luxurious operations in Chicago. Reform elements never accepted the segregated vice districts and wanted them all destroyed, but in large cities, the political machine was powerful enough to keep the reformers at bay. Finally, around 1900 to 1910, the reformers grew politically strong enough to shut down the system of vice segregation, and the survivors went underground.

=== Government and media ===
During the election of April 23, 1875, the voters of Chicago chose to operate under the Illinois Cities and Villages Act of 1872. Chicago still operates under this act, in lieu of a charter. The Cities and Villages Act has been revised several times since, and may be found in Chapter 65 of the Illinois Compiled Statutes.

Late-19th-century big city newspapers such as the Chicago Daily News - founded in 1875 by Melville Stone - ushered in an era of news reporting that was, unlike earlier periods, in tune with the particulars of community life in specific cities. Vigorous competition between older and newer-style city papers soon broke out, centered on civic activism and sensationalist reporting of urban political issues and the numerous problems associated with rapid urban growth. Competition was especially fierce between the Chicago Times (Democratic), the Chicago Tribune (Republican), and the Daily News (independent), with the latter becoming the city's most popular paper by the 1880s. The city's boasting lobbyists and politicians earned Chicago the nickname "Windy City" in the New York press. The city adopted the nickname as its own.

== 20th century ==
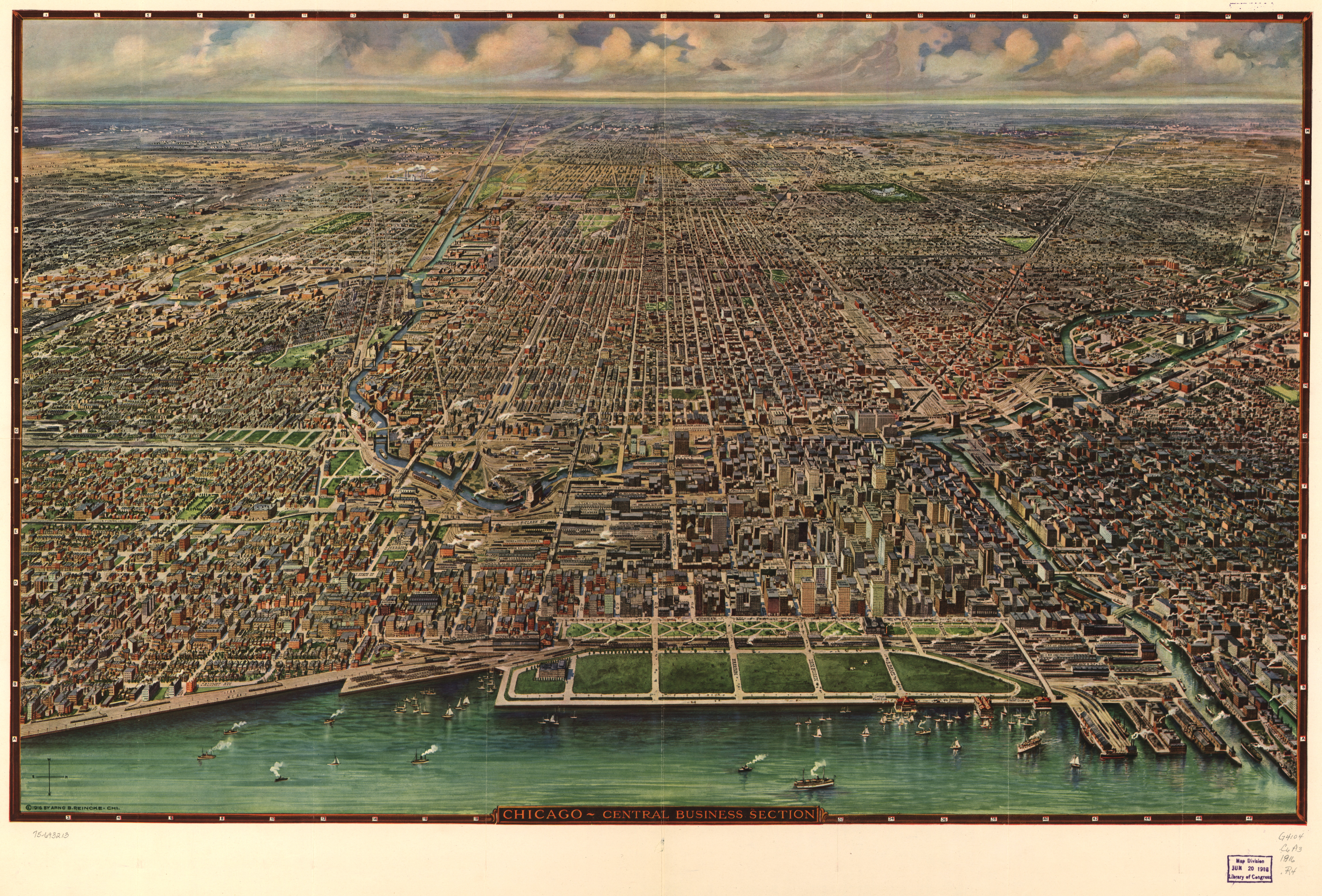
Birds-eye view of Chicago in 1916

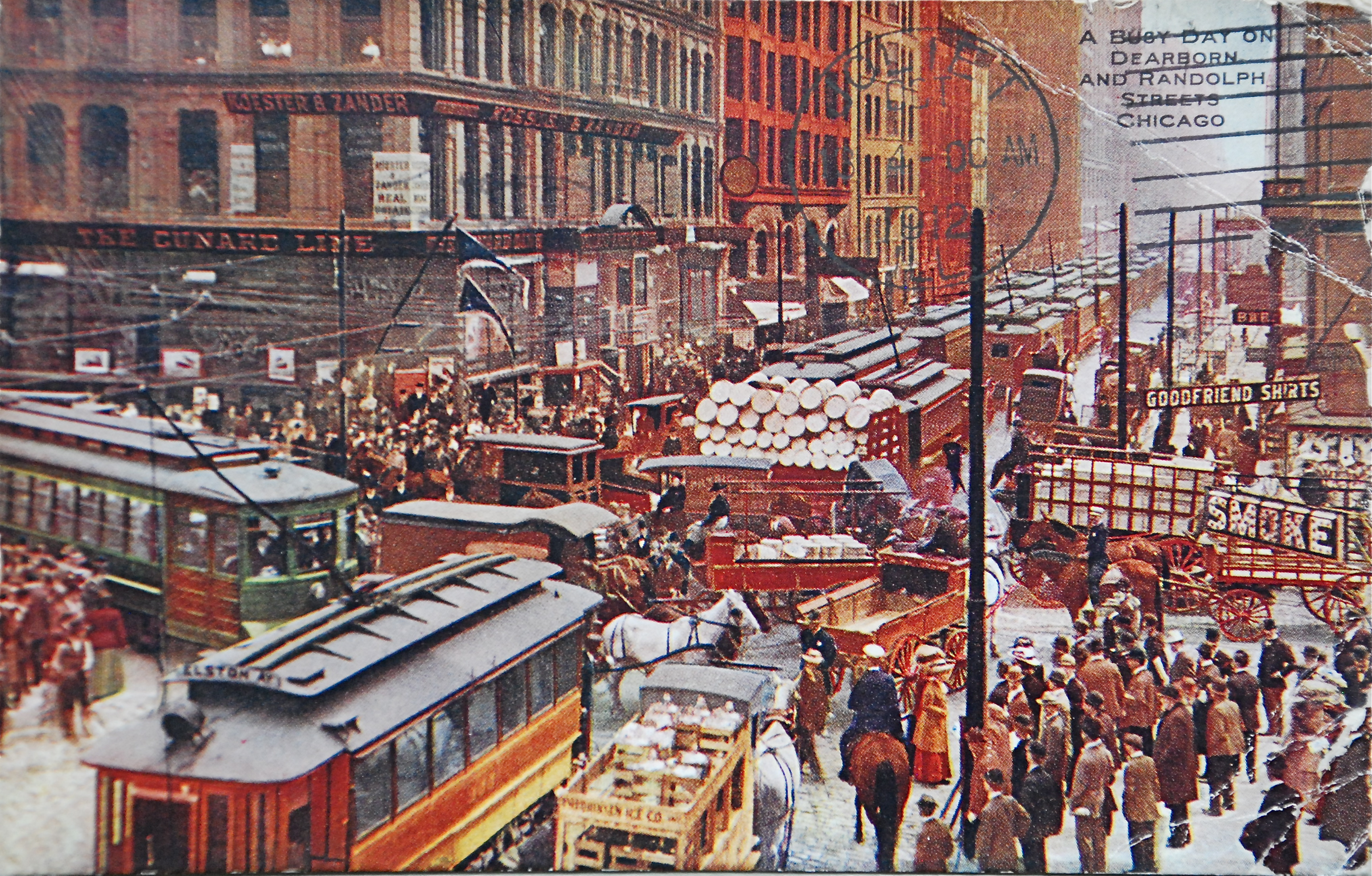
Loop street scene in 1900; colorized photograph

Chicago's manufacturing and retail sectors, fostered by the expansion of railroads throughout the upper Midwest and East, grew rapidly and came to dominate the Midwest and greatly influence the nation's economy. The Chicago Union Stock Yards dominated the packing trade. Chicago became the world's largest rail hub, and one of its busiest ports by shipping traffic on the Great Lakes. Commodity resources, such as lumber, iron and coal, were brought to Chicago and Ohio for processing, with products shipped both East and West to support new growth.

Lake Michigan—the primary source of fresh water for the city—became polluted from the rapidly growing industries in and around Chicago; a new way of procuring clean water was needed. In 1885 the civil engineer Lyman Edgar Cooley proposed the Chicago Sanitary and Ship Canal. He envisioned a deep waterway that would dilute and divert the city's sewage by funneling water from Lake Michigan into a canal, which would drain into the Mississippi River via the Illinois River. Beyond presenting a solution for Chicago's sewage problem, Cooley's proposal appealed to the economic need to link the Midwest with America's central waterways to compete with East Coast shipping and railroad industries.

Strong regional support for the project led the Illinois legislature to circumvent the federal government and complete the canal with state funding. The opening in January 1900 met with controversy and a lawsuit against Chicago's appropriation of water from Lake Michigan. By the 1920s the lawsuit was divided between the states of the Mississippi River Valley, who supported the development of deep waterways linking the Great Lakes with the Mississippi, and the Great Lakes states, which feared sinking water levels might harm shipping in the lakes. In 1929 the U.S. Supreme Court ruled in support of Chicago's use of the canal to promote commerce, but ordered the city to discontinue its use for sewage disposal.

New construction boomed in the 1920s, with notable landmarks such as the Merchandise Mart and art deco Chicago Board of Trade Building completed in 1930. The Wall Street Crash of 1929, the Great Depression and diversion of resources into World War II led to the suspension for years of new construction.

The Century of Progress International Exposition was the name of the World's Fair held on the Near South Side lakefront from 1933 to 1934 to celebrate the city's centennial. The theme of the fair was technological innovation over the century since Chicago's founding. More than 40 million people visited the fair, which symbolized for many hope for Chicago and the nation, then in the midst of the Great Depression.

Black belts: South Side and West Side in 2020

=== Black Chicago and the Great Migration ===
While whites from rural areas arrived and generally settled in the suburban parts of the city, large numbers of blacks from the South arrived as well. The near South Side of the city became the first Black residential area, as it had the oldest, less expensive housing. Although restricted by segregation and competing ethnic groups such as the Irish, gradually continued black migration caused this community to expand, as well as the black neighborhoods on the near West Side. These were de facto segregated areas (few blacks were tolerated in ethnic white neighborhoods); the Irish and ethnic groups who had been longer in the city began to move to outer areas and the suburbs. After World War II, the city built public housing for working-class families to upgrade residential quality. The high-rise design of such public housing proved a problem when industrial jobs left the city and poor families became concentrated in the facilities. After 1950, public housing high rises anchored poor black neighborhoods south and west of the Loop.

==== 1919 race riot ====
The Chicago race riot of 1919 was a violent racial conflict started by White Americans against Black Americans that began on the South Side on July 27 and ended on August 3, 1919. During the riot, 38 people died (23 Black and 15 White). Over the week, injuries attributed to the episodic confrontations stood at 537, with two thirds of the injured being Black and one third White, and approximately 1,000 to 2,000, most of whom were Black, lost their homes. Due to its sustained violence and widespread economic impact, it was the worst of the scores of riots and civil disturbances across the nation during the "Red Summer" of 1919, so named because of the racial and labor violence and fatalities.

=== Early 20th centuries ===
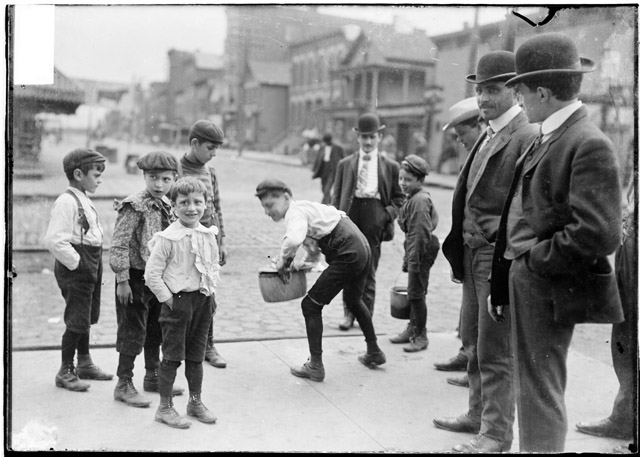
Jewish men and boys standing on a sidewalk in Chicago, 1903

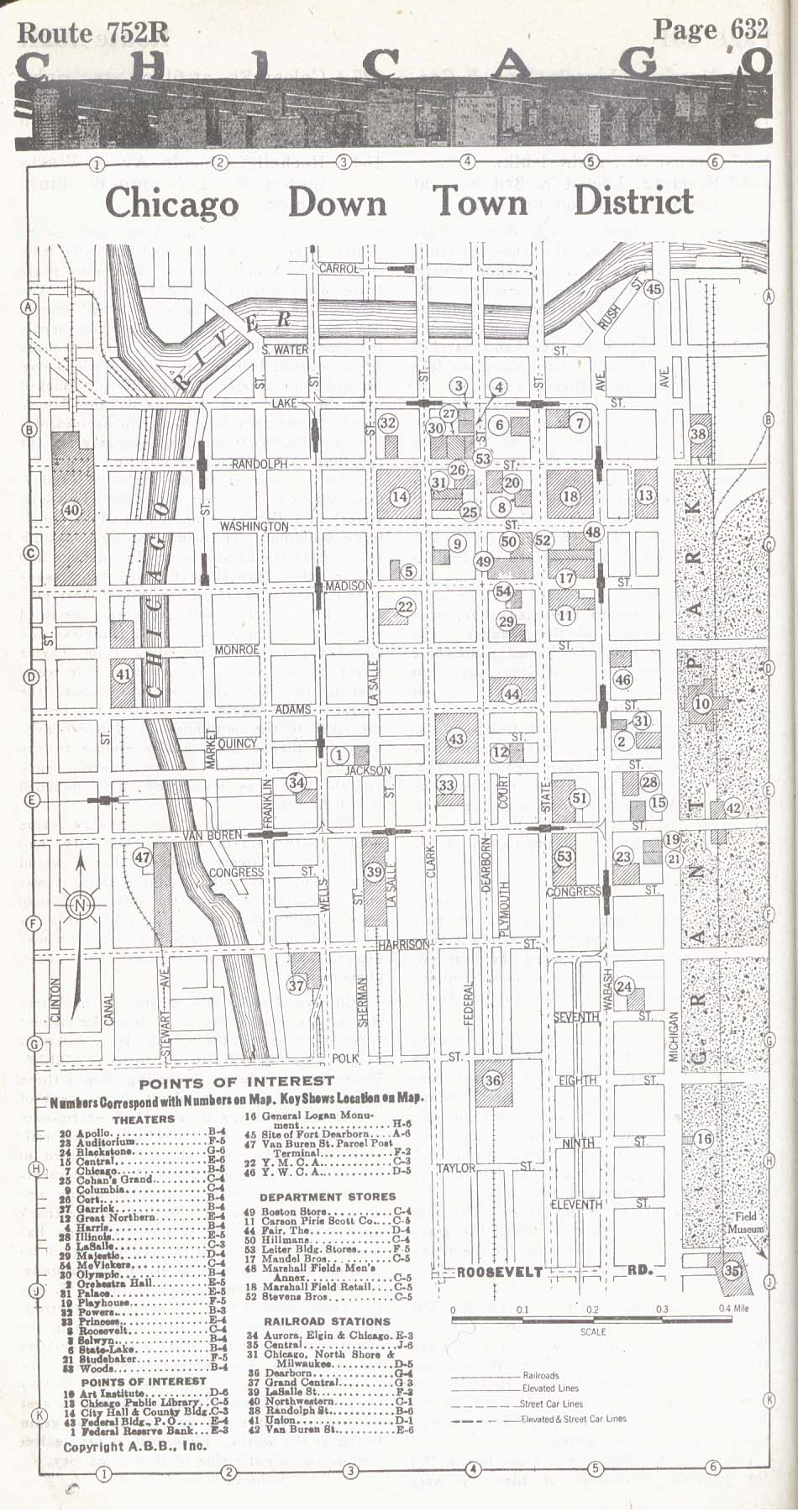
Map of downtown Chicago in 1917.

==== Crime ====
By 1900, Progressive Era political and legal reformers initiated far-ranging changes in the American criminal justice system, with Chicago taking the lead.

The city became notorious worldwide for its rate of murders in the early 20th century, yet the courts failed to convict the killers. More than three-fourths of cases were not closed. Even when the police made arrests in cases where killers' identities were known, jurors typically exonerated or acquitted them. A blend of gender-, race-, and class-based notions of justice trumped the rule of law, producing low homicide conviction rates during a period of soaring violence.

During the late 19th and early 20th centuries, rates of domestic murder tripled in Chicago. According to historian Jeffrey S. Adler, domestic homicide was often a manifestation of strains in gender relations induced by urban and industrial change. At the core of such family murders were male attempts to preserve masculine authority. Yet, there were nuances in the motives for the murder of family members, and study of the patterns of domestic homicide among different ethnic groups reveals basic cultural differences. German male immigrants tended to murder over declining status and the failure to achieve economic prosperity. Italian men killed family members to save a gender-based ideal of respectability that entailed patriarchal control over women and family reputation. African American men, like the Germans, often murdered in response to economic conditions but not over desperation about the future. Like the Italians, the killers tended to be young, but family honor was not usually at stake. Instead, black men murdered to regain control of wives and lovers who resisted their patriarchal "rights".

Progressive reformers in the business community created the Chicago Crime Commission (CCC) in 1919 after an investigation into a robbery at a factory showed the city's criminal justice system was deficient. The CCC initially served as a watchdog of the justice system. After its suggestion that the city's justice system begin collecting criminal records was rejected, the CCC assumed a more active role in fighting crime. The commission's role expanded further after Frank J. Loesch became president in 1928. Loesch recognized the need to eliminate the glamor that Chicago's media typically attributed to criminals. Determined to expose the violence of the crime world, Loesch drafted a list of "public enemies"; among them was Al Capone, whom he made a scapegoat for widespread social problems.

After the passage of Prohibition, the 1920s brought international notoriety to Chicago. Bootleggers and smugglers bringing in liquor from Canada formed powerful gangs. They competed with each other for lucrative profits, and to evade the police, to bring liquor to speakeasies and private clients. The most notorious was Al Capone.

=== Immigration and migration in the 20th century ===
From 1890 to 1914, migrations swelled, attracting to the city of mostly unskilled Catholic and Jewish immigrants from Southern and Eastern Europe, including Italians, Greeks, Czechs, Poles, Lithuanians, Ukrainians, Hungarians, and Slovaks. World War I cut off immigration from Europe, which brought hundreds of thousands of southern blacks and whites into Northern cities to fill in the labor shortages. The Immigration Act of 1924 restricted populations from southern and eastern Europe, apart from refugees after World War II. The heavy annual turnover of ethnic populations ended, and the groups stabilized, each favoring specific neighborhoods.

"Old stock" Americans who relocated to Chicago after 1900 preferred the outlying areas and suburbs, with their commutes eased by train lines, making Oak Park and Evanston enclaves of the upper middle class. In the 1910s, high-rise luxury apartments were constructed along the lakefront north of the Loop, continuing into the 21st century. They attracted wealthy residents but few families with children, as wealthier families moved to suburbs for the schools. There were problems in the public school system; mostly Catholic students attended schools in the large parochial system, which was of middling quality. There were a few private schools. The Latin School, Francis Parker and later The Bateman School, all centrally located served those who could afford to pay.

The northern and western suburbs developed some of the best public schools in the nation, which were strongly supported by their wealthier residents. The suburban trend accelerated after 1945, with the construction of highways and train lines that made commuting easier. Middle-class Chicagoans headed to the outlying areas of the city, and then into the Cook County and Dupage County suburbs. As ethnic Jews and Irish rose in economic class, they left the city and headed north. Well-educated migrants from around the country moved to the far suburbs.

Chicago's Polonia sustained diverse political cultures in the early twentieth century, each with its own newspaper. In 1920 the community had a choice of five daily papers – from the Socialist Dziennik Ludowy (People's Daily; 1907–1925) to the Polish Roman Catholic Union's Dziennik Zjednoczenia (Union Daily; 1921–1939). The decision to subscribe to a particular paper reaffirmed a particular ideology or institutional network based on ethnicity and class, which lent itself to different alliances and different strategies.

In 1926, the city hosted the 28th International Eucharistic Congress, a major event for the Catholic community of Chicago.

As the First World War cut off immigration, tens of thousands of African Americans came north in the Great Migration. With new populations competing for limited housing and jobs, especially on the South Side, social tensions rose in the city. Postwar years were more difficult. Black veterans looked for more respect for having served their nation, and some whites resented it.

In 1919, the Chicago race riot erupted, in what became known as "Red Summer", when other major cities also suffered mass racial violence based in competition for jobs and housing as the country's employment infrastructure struggled to absorb veterans in the postwar years. During the riot, thirty-eight people died (23 black and 15 white) and over five hundred were injured. Much of the violence against blacks in Chicago was led by members of ethnic Irish athletic clubs, who had much political power in the city and defended their "territory" against African Americans. As was typical in these occurrences, more blacks than whites died in the violence.

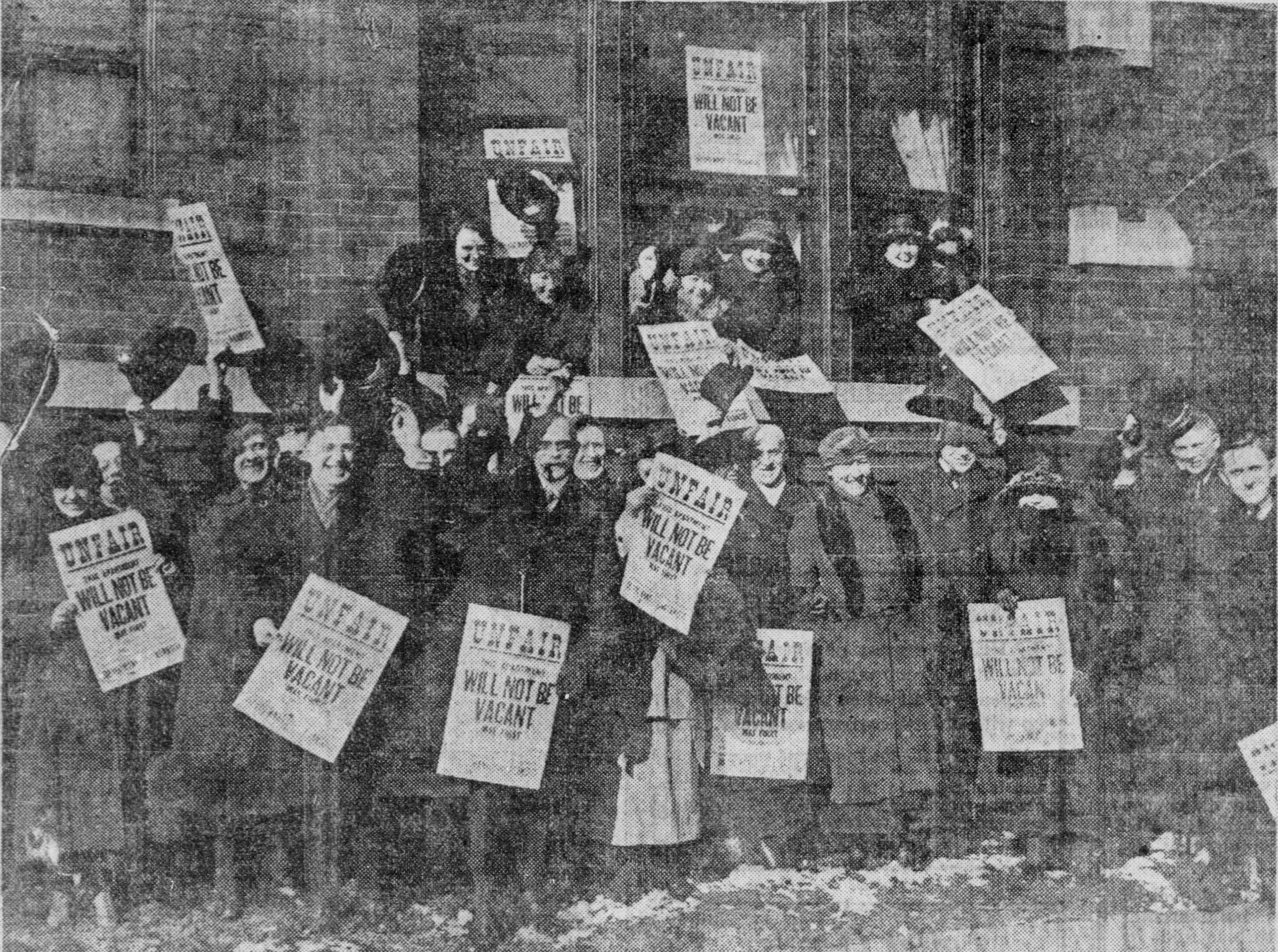
Chicago tenants picket against rent increases (March 1920)

From 1920 to 1921, the city was affected by a series of tenant rent strikes. Which lead to the formation of the Chicago Tenants Protective association, passage of the Kessenger tenant laws, and of a heat ordinance that legally required flats to be kept above 68 °F (20 °C) during winter months by landlords.

Concentrating the family resources to achieve home ownership was a common strategy in the ethnic European neighborhoods. It meant sacrificing current consumption, and pulling children out of school as soon as they could earn a wage. By 1900, working-class ethnic immigrants owned homes at higher rates than native-born people. After borrowing from friends and building associations, immigrants kept boarders, grew market gardens, and opened home-based commercial laundries, eroding home-work distinctions, while sending out women and children to work to repay loans. They sought not middle-class upward mobility but the security of home ownership. Many social workers wanted them to pursue upward job mobility (which required more education), but realtors asserted that houses were better than a bank for a poor man. With hindsight, and considering uninsured banks' precariousness, this appears to have been true. Chicago's workers made immense sacrifices for home ownership, contributing to Chicago's sprawling suburban geography and to modern myths about the American dream. The Jewish community, by contrast, rented apartments and maximized education and upward mobility for the next generation. Chicago ethnic communities operated 199 small neighborhood banks in the booming 1920s. They specialized in financing mortgages for their community. After the Great depression hit in1929 income dropped, rents went unpaid, mortgages were foreclosed; the resale value of homes plunged. By 1933, only 33 of the 199 survived.

Beginning in the 1940s, waves of Hispanic immigrants began to arrive. The largest numbers were from Mexico and Puerto Rico, as well as Cuba during the 1950s. During the 1980s, Hispanic immigrants were more likely to be from Central and South America.

After 1965 and new laws that opened the doors to immigration, Asian immigrants came in growing numbers. The largest proportion were well-educated Indians and Chinese, who generally settled directly in the suburbs. By the 1970s gentrification began in the city, in some cases with people renovating housing in old inner city neighborhoods, and attracting singles and gay people.

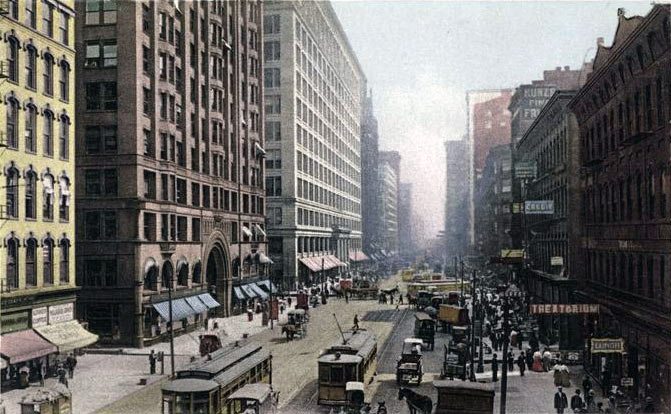
State Street c. 1907

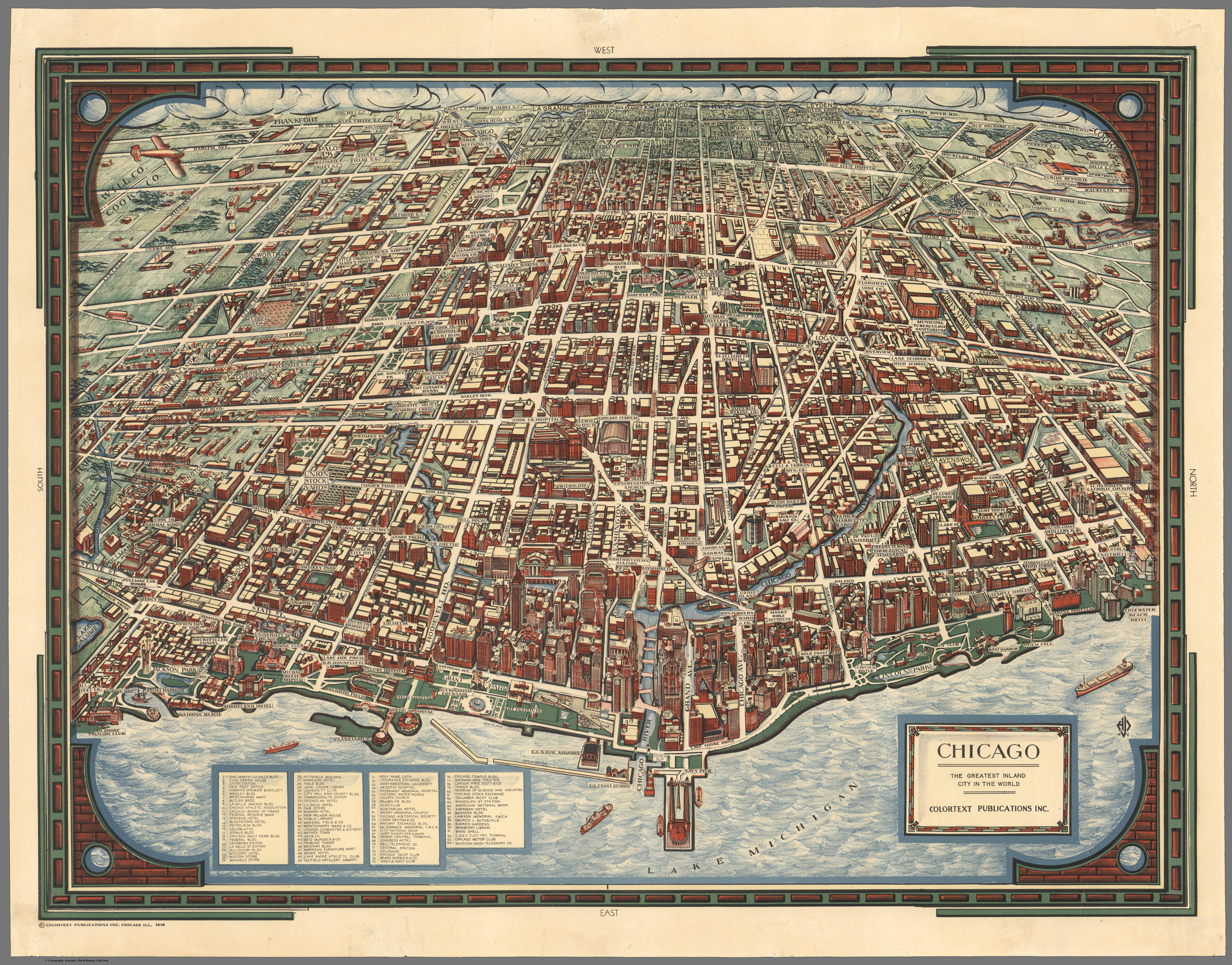
Bird's eye view of Chicago in 1938

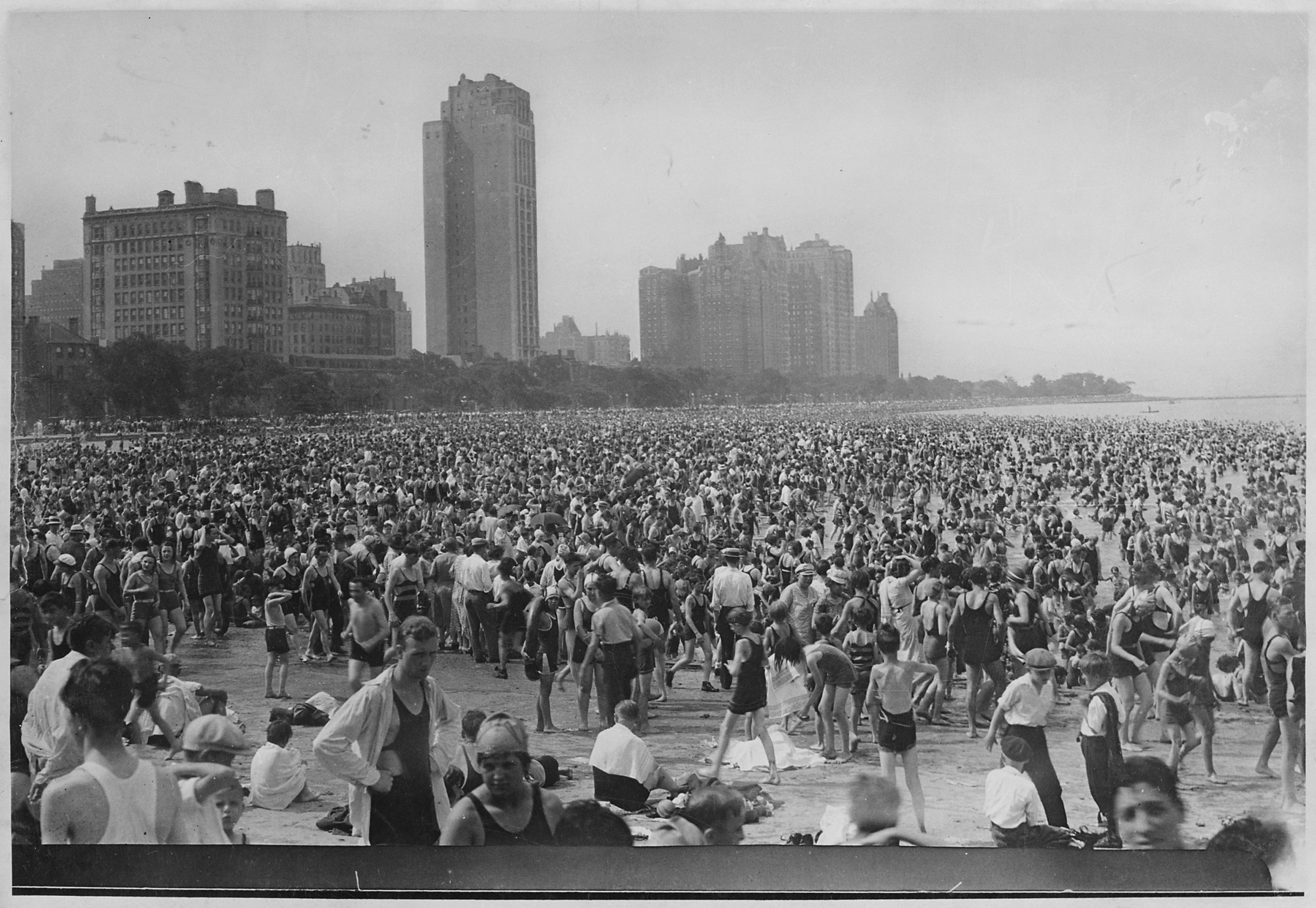
Oak Street Beach, 1925

=== Advertising ===
Chicago became the center of the nation's advertising industry after New York City. Albert Lasker, known as the "father of modern advertising", made Chicago his base from 1898 to 1942. As head of the Lord and Thomas agency, Lasker devised a copywriting technique that appealed directly to the psychology of the consumer. Women, who seldom smoked cigarettes, were told that if they smoked Lucky Strikes, they could stay slender. Lasker's use of radio, particularly with his campaigns for Palmolive soap, Pepsodent toothpaste, Kotex products, and Lucky Strike cigarettes, not only revolutionized the advertising industry but also significantly changed popular culture.

=== Labor unions ===
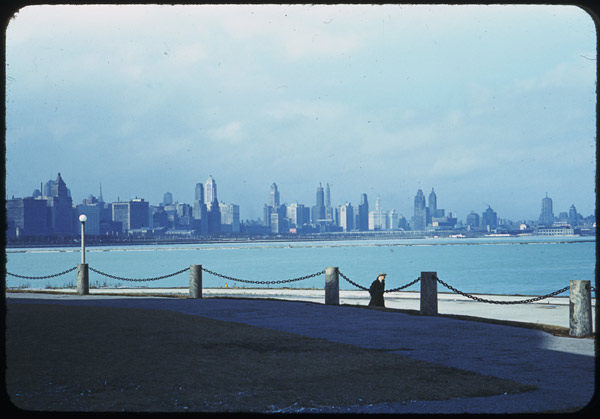
Chicago skyline from Northerly Island Taken sometime in 1941

After 1900 Chicago was a heavily unionized city, apart from the factories (which were non-union until the 1930s). The Railroad brotherhoods were strong, as were the crafts unions affiliated with the American Federation of Labor. The AFL unions operated through the Chicago Federation of Labor to minimize jurisdictional conflicts, which caused many strikes as two unions battled to control a work site.

The unionized teamsters in Chicago enjoyed an unusually strong bargaining position when they contended with employers around the city, or supported another union in a specific strike. Their wagons could easily be positioned to disrupt streetcars and block traffic. In addition, their families and neighborhood supporters often surrounded and attacked the wagons of nonunion teamsters who were strikebreaking. When the teamsters used their clout to engage in sympathy strikes, employers decided to coordinate their antiunion efforts, claiming that the teamsters held too much power over commerce in their control of the streets. The teamsters' strike in 1905 represented a clash both over labor issues and the public nature of the streets. To the employers, the streets were arteries for commerce, while to the teamsters, they remained public spaces integral to their neighborhoods.

=== World War II ===
On December 2, 1942, the world's first controlled nuclear reaction was conducted at the University of Chicago as part of the top secret Manhattan Project.

During World War II, the steel mills in the city of Chicago alone accounted for 20% of all steel production in the United States and 10% of global production. The city produced more steel than the United Kingdom during the war, and surpassed Nazi Germany's output in 1943 (after barely missing in 1942).

The city's diversified industrial base made it second only to Detroit in the value—$24 billion—of war goods produced. Over 1,400 companies produced everything from field rations to parachutes to torpedoes, while new aircraft plants employed 100,000 in the construction of engines, aluminum sheeting, bombsights, and other components. The Great Migration, which had been on pause due to the Depression, resumed at an even faster pace as the 1910 - 1930 period, as hundreds of thousands of black Americans arrived in the city to work in the steel mills, railroads, and shipping yards.

=== Postwar ===
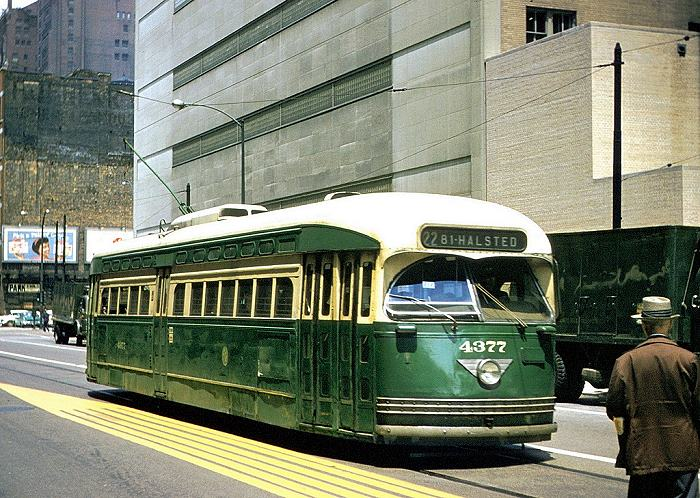
PCC streetcar, Chicago, 1950 - the last ran in 1958

Returning World War II veterans and immigrants from Europe (in particular displaced persons from Eastern Europe) created a postwar economic boom and led to the development of huge housing tracts on Chicago's Northwest and Southwest sides. The city was extensively photographed during the postwar years by street photographers such as Richard Nickel and Vivian Maier.

In the 1950s, the postwar desire for new and improved housing, aided by new highways and commuter train lines, caused many middle and higher income Americans to begin to move from the inner-city of Chicago to the suburbs. Changes in industry after 1950, with restructuring of the stockyards and steel industries, led to massive job losses in the city for working-class people. The city population shrank by nearly 700,000. The City Council devised "Plan 21" to improve neighborhoods and focused on creating "Suburbs within the city" near downtown and the lakefront. It built public housing to try to improve housing standards in the city. As a result, many poor were uprooted from newly created enclaves of Black, Latino, and poor people in neighborhoods such as Near North, Wicker Park, Lakeview, Uptown, Cabrini–Green, West Town and Lincoln Park. The passage of civil rights laws in the 1960s also affected Chicago and other northern cities. In the 1960s and the 1970s, many middle- and upper-class Americans continued to move from the city for better housing and schools in the suburbs.

Office building resumed in the 1960s. When completed in 1974, the Sears Tower, now known as the Willis Tower, was at 1451 feet the world's tallest building. It was designed by the famous Chicago firm of Skidmore, Owings & Merrill, which designed many of the city's other famous buildings.

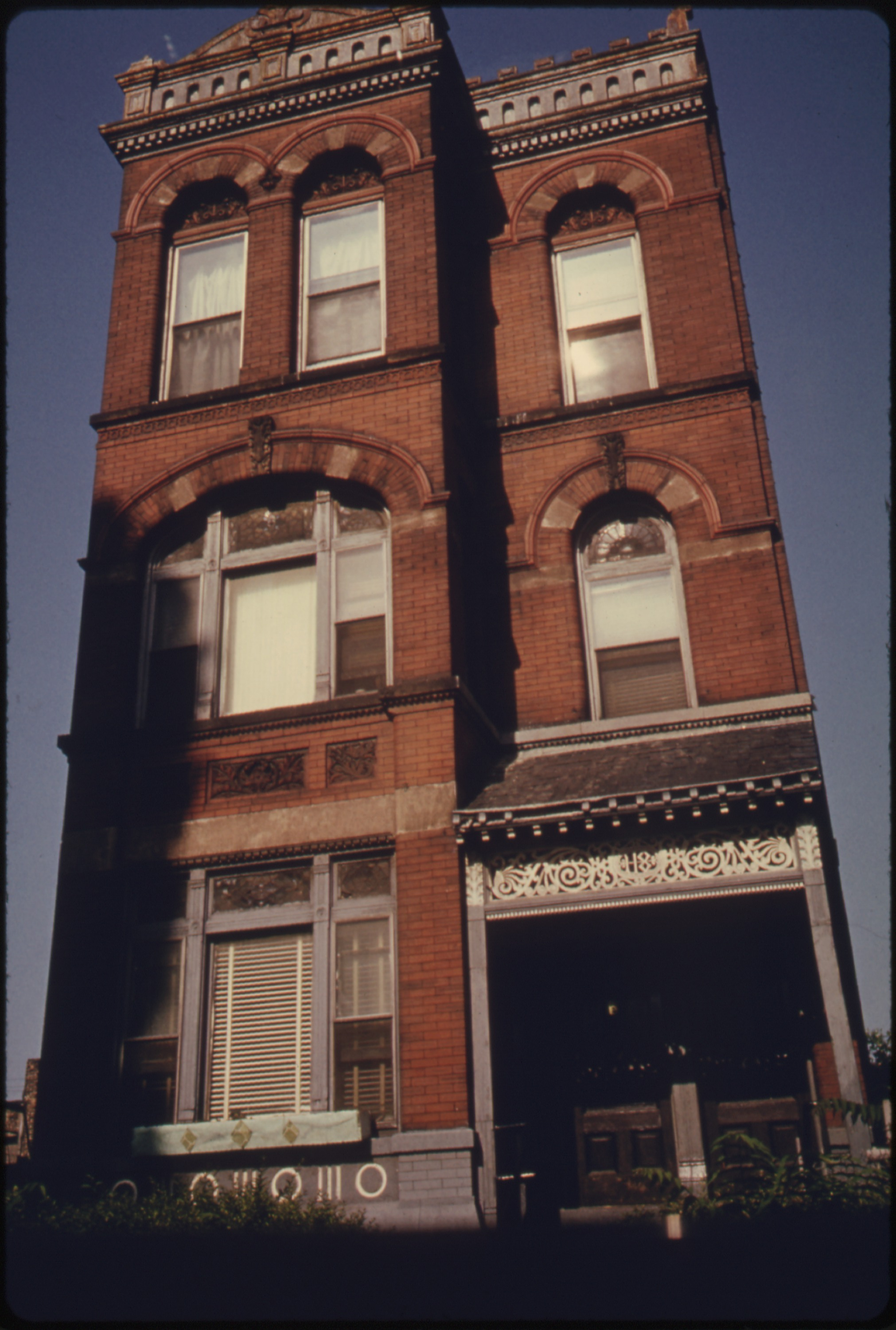
House in Chicago's inner city, 1974. Photo by Danny Lyon.

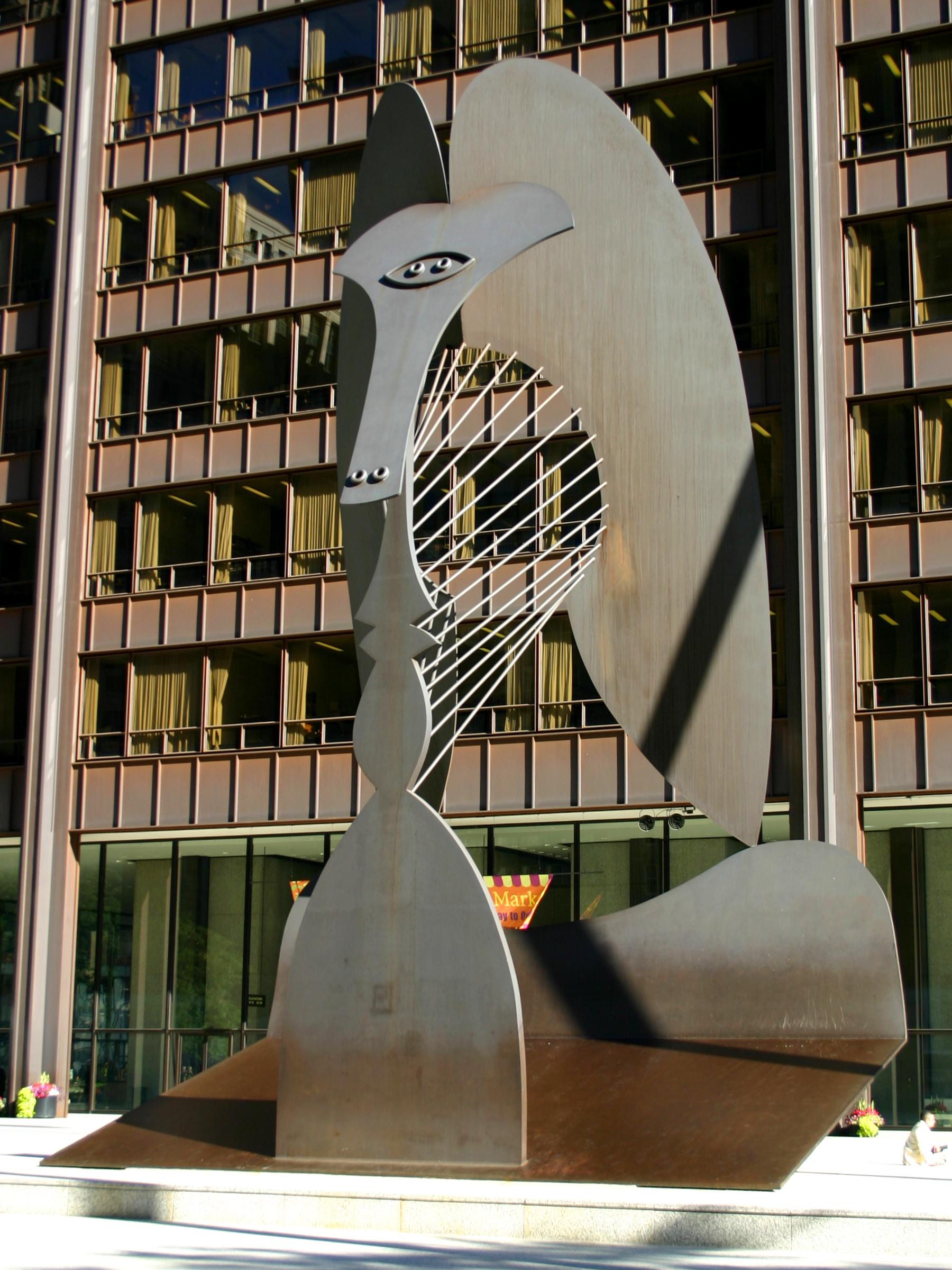
Chicago Picasso, a 1967 sculpture in Daley Plaza. Pablo Picasso refused the $100,000 fee and donated it to the people of Chicago.

Mayor Richard J. Daley served 1955–1976, dominating the city's machine politics by his control of the Cook County Democratic Central Committee, which selected party nominees, who were usually elected in the Democratic stronghold. Daley took credit for building four major expressways focused on the Loop, and city-owned O'Hare Airport (which became the world's busiest airport, displacing Midway Airport's prior claims). Several neighborhoods near downtown and the lakefront were gentrified and transformed into "suburbs within the city". He held office during the unrest of the 1960s, some of which was provoked by the police department's discriminatory practices. In the Lincoln Park, Lakeview, Wicker Park and Humboldt Park communities, the Young Lords under the leadership of Jose Cha Cha Jimenez marched and held sit ins to protest the displacement of Latinos and the poor. After the assassination of Martin Luther King Jr. in 1968, major riots of despair resulted in the burning down of sections of the black neighborhoods of the South and West sides. Protests against the Vietnam War at the 1968 Democratic National Convention, held in Chicago, resulted in street violence, with televised broadcasts of the Chicago police's beating of unarmed protesters.

In 1979, Jane Byrne, the city's first woman mayor, was elected, winning the Democratic primary due to a citywide outrage about the ineffective snow removal across the city. In 1983, Harold Washington became the first black mayor of Chicago. Richard M. Daley, son of Richard J. Daley, became mayor in 1989, and was repeatedly reelected until he declined to seek re-election in 2011. He sparked debate by demolishing many of the city's vast public housing projects, which had deteriorated and were holding too many poor and dysfunctional families. Concepts for new affordable and public housing have changed to include many new features to make them more viable: smaller scale, environmental designs for public safety, mixed-rate housing, etc. New projects during Daley's administration have been designed to be environmentally sound, more accessible and better for their occupants.

== 21st century ==
In September 2008, Chicago accepted a $2.52 billion bid on a 99-year lease of Midway International Airport to a group of private investors, but the deal fell through due to the collapse of credit markets during the 2008 financial crisis In 2008, as Chicago struggled to close a growing budget deficit, the city agreed to a 75-year, $1.16 billion deal to lease its parking meter system to an operating company created by Morgan Stanley. Daley said the "agreement is very good news for the taxpayers of Chicago because it will provide more than $1 billion in net proceeds that can be used during this very difficult economy." The agreement quadrupled rates, in the first year alone, while the hours which people have to pay for parking were broadened from 9 a.m. – 6 p.m. to 8 a.m. – 9 p.m., and from Monday through Saturday to every day of the week. Additionally, the city agreed to compensate the new owners for loss of revenue any time any road with parking meters is closed by the city for anything from maintenance work to street festivals. In three years, the proceeds from the lease were all but spent. In his annual budget address on October 21, 2009, Daley projected a deficit for 2009 of more than $520 million. Daley proposed a 2010 budget totaling $6.14 billion, including spending $370 million from the $1.15 billion proceeds from the parking meter lease. In his annual budget address on October 13, 2010, Daley projected a deficit for 2010 of $655 million, the largest in city history. Daley proposed a 2011 budget totaling $6.15 billion, including spending all but $76 million of what remained of the parking meter lease proceeds, and received a standing ovation from aldermen.

In 2011, Rahm Emanuel was elected mayor of Chicago. Chicago earned the title of "City of the Year" in 2008 from GQ for contributions in architecture and literature, its world of politics, and the downtown's starring role in the Batman movie The Dark Knight. The city was rated by Moody's as having the most balanced economy in the United States due to its high level of diversification.

== Flag ==
Four historical events are commemorated by the four red stars on Chicago's flag: The United States' Fort Dearborn, established at the mouth of the Chicago River in 1803; the Great Chicago Fire of 1871, which destroyed much of the city; the World Columbian Exposition of 1893, by which Chicago celebrated its recovery from the fire; and the Century of Progress World's Fair of 1933–1934, which celebrated the city's centennial. The flag's two blue stripes symbolize the north and south branches of the Chicago River, which flows through the city's downtown. The three white stripes represent the North, West and South sides of the city, Lake Michigan being the east side.

== Major disasters ==
The most famous and serious disaster was the Great Chicago Fire of 1871.

On December 30, 1903, the "absolutely fireproof", five-week-old Iroquois Theater was engulfed by fire. The fire lasted less than thirty minutes; 602 people died as a result of being burned, asphyxiated, or trampled.

The S.S. Eastland was a cruise ship based in Chicago and used for tours. On July 24, 1915—a calm, sunny day—the ship was taking on passengers when it rolled over while tied to a dock in the Chicago River. A total of 844 passengers and crew were killed. An investigation found that the Eastland had become too heavy with rescue gear that had been ordered by Congress in the wake of the Titanic disaster.

On December 1, 1958, the Our Lady of the Angels School Fire occurred in the Humboldt Park area. The fire killed 92 students and three nuns; in response, fire safety improvements were made to public and private schools across the United States.

April 13, 1992, billions of dollars in damage was caused by the Chicago Flood, when a hole was accidentally drilled into the long-abandoned (and mostly forgotten) Chicago Tunnel system, which was still connected to the basements of numerous buildings in the Loop. It flooded the central business district with 250 million US gallons (950,000 m^{3}) of water from the Chicago River.

A major environmental disaster occurred in July 1995, when a week of record high heat and humidity caused 739 heat-related deaths, mostly among isolated elderly poor and others without air conditioning.

== The mayors ==
Between 1833 and 1837, Chicago was incorporated as a town and headed by town presidents. Since 1837, it has been incorporated as a city and headed by mayors. The mayoral term in Chicago was one year from 1837 through 1863, when it was changed to two years. In 1907, it was changed again, this time to four years. Until 1861, municipal elections were held in March. In that year, legislation moved them to April. In 1869, however, election day was changed to November, and terms expiring in April of that year were changed. In 1875, election day was moved back to April by the city's vote to operate under the Cities and Villages Act of 1872.

A 1995 Illinois law stipulated that "candidates for mayor ... no longer would run under party labels in Chicago". However, Richard M. Daley, Rahm Emanuel, Lori Lightfoot, and Brandon Johnson are known to be Democrats.

== See also ==
- American urban history
- Bibliography of Chicago history
- Chicago in the 1930s
- Ethnic groups in Chicago; the larger groups have articles such as Germans in Chicago, South Side Irish, Poles in Chicago, History of African Americans in Chicago, Mexicans in Chicago, Puerto Ricans in Chicago
- History of education in Chicago
- History of public health in Chicago
- Political history of Chicago
- Roman Catholic Archdiocese of Chicago
- Timeline of Chicago history
