= The Bateman School =

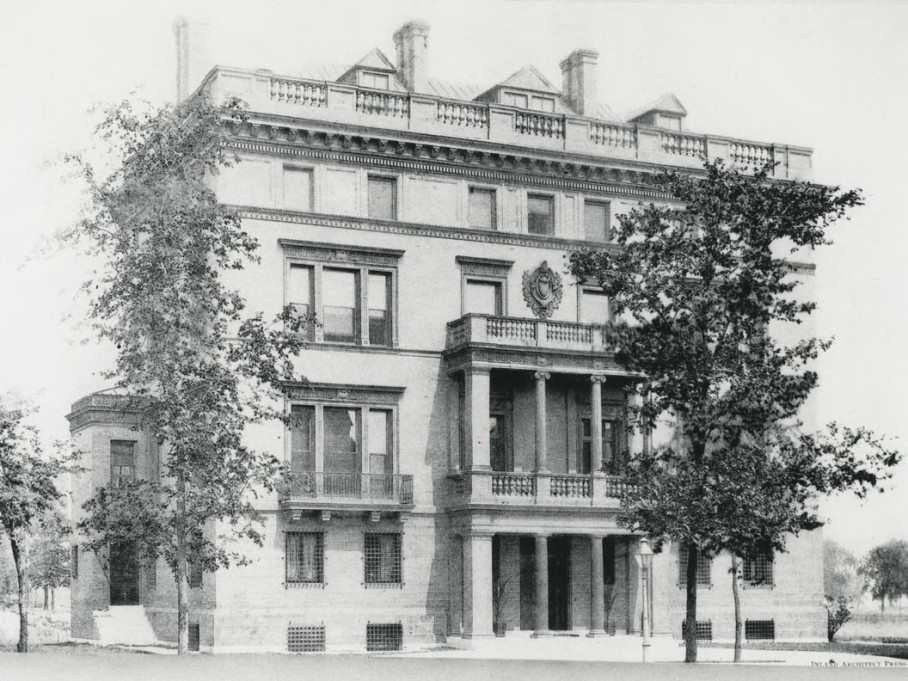
- Patterson McCormick Mansion, home of The Bateman School

Location
- 20 E. Burton Place; Chicago, Illinois; United States

Information
- School type: Private
- Founded: 1937
- Founder: Alice Bateman Craig
- Status: Closed
- Closed: 1976
- Grades: K - 12
- Campus: Patterson-McCormick Mansion
- Campus type: Urban
- Song: You'll Never Walk Alone
- Rival: Latin School, Francis Parker
- Accreditation: North Central Association of Colleges and Secondary Schools
- Yearbook: the Odyssey

The Bateman School was a private school located in Chicago's "Gold Coast." From 1950 onward, the school was housed in the historic Patterson-McCormick Mansion. The school closed doors in the mid-1970s by financial pressures. The Bateman School was founded at 1106 Lake Shore Drive, Chicago, in 1937, when the director, Miss Alice C Bateman, graduated from Northwestern University. The school was co-educational and non-sectarian and had policies based on democratic principles. Five students attended the first day school when it opened at 1106 Lake Shore Drive.

== 1000 Lake Shore Drive ==
As enrollment increased, the school was moved in 1941 to 1000 Lake Shore Drive to accommodate over 300 students. At the close of the first year at the new location, the parents requested that a high school be added, and it was agreed that the Director would add a year of high school each successive year. In 1949 the school graduated its first senior high class of fourteen students. All these pupils were able to enter college without examinations, as the Bateman School had attained complete accreditation from the Office of Public Instruction in Springfield, IL.

== 20 East Burton Place ==
In the spring of 1950 a corporation was formed. The corporation purchased the former home of Cyrus McCormick, at 20 East Burton Place, as the new site for the school. In later years, this historic building became synonymous with Bateman School. The school received its full accreditation from the North Central Association of Colleges and Secondary Schools, in nineteen states, and which is recognized throughout the country as well as abroad.

One stated goal was to prepare students to be, "citizens of the world." Languages studies included French, Spanish, Russian and Latin, and were offered in early grades.

The school closed its doors in 1976. In that same year, the building had become a liability and there was a move to demolish the building. Eventually the building was sold and developed into condos.

Ellen Bateman died Sep 8, 1966

Alice Bateman Craig passed at 82 years of age in June, 1996

== Camp McCormick ==
Camp McCormick was the satellite summer camp of the Bateman School. Located in Eagle River, Wisconsin, it offered horseback riding, camping, boating along with drama and academic courses for credit.

== Notable graduates ==
- Jane Steele - Actress and vocalist
- Brigid Bazlen - Hollywood actress
- Harry Rushakoff - Musician and drummer for rock band Concrete Blond
- Lani Hall Alpert - Vocalist and writer
- Jeffrey Brickman - Marketing/Advertising Exec: Created 1st digital/online ad & HDTV commercial campaigns
