= Mexicans in Chicago =

Total population 1,702,582 (2023, est.) Regions with significant populations Chicago's Southwest Side; Southeast Side; West Side; Northwest Side and Cook County Languages Mexican Spanish, Inland Northern American English

There is a very large Mexican American community in the Chicago metropolitan area. The Mexican American community in Chicago and Illinois as a whole is the largest outside of the Western United States.

== History ==
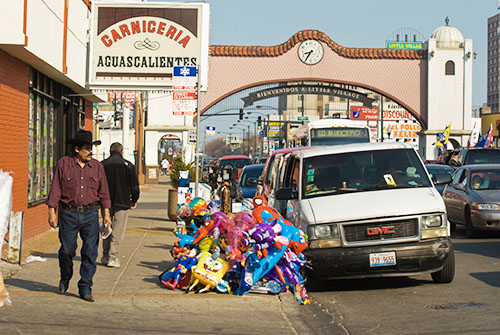
26th Street in Little Village is a major hub for Chicago's Mexican community.

The first Mexicans who came to Chicago, mostly entertainers and itinerants, came before the turn of the 20th century. In the mid to late 1910s Chicago had its first significant wave of Mexican immigrants. Originally the immigrants were mostly men working in semiskilled and unskilled jobs who originated from Texas and from Guanajuato, Jalisco, and Michoacán. After immigration was largely reduced in the 1920s, internal migration from the Southwestern United States became the primary driver of the growth of the Mexican population in Chicago.

Circa the 1920s, Mexicans were used as a buffer between Whites and Blacks. René Luis Alvarez, a professor at Northeastern Illinois University, stated that Whites perceived Mexicans to be apolitical and docile and treated the people originating from Mexico "with a kind of benign neglect and largely ignored their social needs or living conditions." By the end of the 1930s the Mexican population had declined from 20,000 in the 1920s to 14,000; this was due to repatriations to Mexico in the post-Great Depression; Louise A. N. Kerr of the Illinois Periodicals Online (IPO) of Northern Illinois University Libraries stated that officials "seem to have been" less harsh towards those of Mexican origins compared to officials in areas of the Southwest United States. Circa 1941, the Mexican population had risen to 16,000. During the 1940s, braceros were brought to Chicago and became a part of the Mexican-American community.

There were 35,000 people categorized as Spanish-speaking in Chicago by 1950, including Mexicans and Puerto Ricans. In 1960 there were 23,000 Chicagoans who were born in Mexico. In 1970 that number was 47,397, and that year, of all major U.S. cities, Chicago had the fourth-largest Spanish-speaking population; Mexicans made up the majority of Chicago's Hispanophones at that time. From 1960 to 1970 there was an 84% increase in the number of Chicagoans who had at least one parent born in Mexico. In the late 1960s and early 1970s Mexican-origin people in Chicago increasingly became politically active.

== Demographics ==
From the 1990 U.S. census to the 2000 U.S. census, the percentage of Mexican Americans in all of Cook County, Illinois increased by 69%, and the percentage of Mexicans in the City of Chicago in particular increased by 50% in the same time period. As a result, Chicago's number of Mexicans surpassed the number in the cities of Houston and San Antonio, Texas.

As of the 2000 U.S. census there were 786,423 residents of full or partial Mexican origin in Cook County, giving it the largest ethnic Mexican population in the United States that is not in the Southwest and the third largest ethnic Mexican population of any county after Los Angeles County, California and Harris County, Texas. As of that year the number of ethnic Mexicans in Cook County is greater than that of each of the metropolitan areas of Acapulco, Cuernavaca, Chihuahua, and Veracruz. The total includes over 350,000 residents of the City of Chicago.

As of the 2010 Census, 961,963 residents of Cook County, including 578,100 residents of the City of Chicago, had full or partial Mexican origins. The Mexican population of Cook County increased to 1,034,038 as per 2018-2022 estimates, an increase of 31.5% over the 2000 figure. Census Bureau estimates as of 2023 put the Mexican population of the Chicago metropolitan area at 1,702,582.

2018-2022 ACS 5-year Estimates show the mean income for Chicagoland Mexicans was $44,024 and the mean $35,072, on par with other major Mexican hubs such as Los Angeles, Dallas, and Phoenix. The homeownership rate among Mexican households was 63.0%, ranking it fourth among the 10 metropolitan areas with the largest Mexican share of population after McAllen, TX, El Paso, and San Antonio.

== Geography ==
Mexican neighborhoods include Pilsen in the Lower West Side, Little Village in South Lawndale, and South Chicago in the southeast side. They also include West Lawn and West Elsdon near Midway airport. Pilsen was a historic gateway neighborhood for new immigrants first populated mainly by Germans with some Irish and later by Czechs with other predominantly Slavic peoples (Polish Slovaks, Slovenes, Croats) (Serbs) as well as Austrians and Lithuanians before the arrival of Mexicans in the 1950s.

The Mexicans in the Near West Side settled south of Hull House along Halsted and patronized the St. Francis of Assisi church. Beginning in the 1930s the athletic team Saint Francis Wildcats, which had Mexican members, began meeting in the gymnasium of St. Francis of Assisi, and the members moved on to fight in World War II. The Hull House residents were displaced by the 1960s construction of the University of Illinois Chicago, and they moved to Pilsen and/or to suburban communities.

Mexicans began moving into South Chicago in the post-1920s period, and there they stuck to defined neighborhoods and were a part of the working class. They joined area unions by the 1940s.

In the post-1920s period the Mexicans in Back of the Yards mostly worked in meatpacking. In 1945 the first Mexican church opened there.

In the 1990s 40% of the Mexican origin population in Pilsen had migrated directly there from Mexico, and about one third of the Mexican origin population in the Chicago area lived in Pilsen.

In 2000, six Chicago community areas had a population that was majority Mexican. This number has grown to 15 as of 2020, with new hubs on the Southwest Side including Brighton Park, Archer Heights, McKinley Park, and New City. Additionally, nearly two-thirds of Chicagoland Mexicans now live beyond the city's borders, expanding their presence far into suburbs such as Elgin and Aurora.

Since 2000, 26th Street in Little Village has been the busiest area for Mexican-American commerce in the city of Chicago. The thoroughfare was identified as being the highest grossing shopping and tax revenue hub in the city after Michigan Avenue, causing some to call it "the Mexican Magnificent Mile" or "the Second Magnificent Mile."

At the broader metropolitan level, from 2018 to 2022, Mexicans comprised the greatest share of the population in Kane County, followed by Cook and Lake. In absolute numbers, Cook County continued to hold the highest Mexican population, followed by Kane and Lake. A table outlining these figures can be found below:

2018-2022 Mexican community statistics
| County | Mexican share | Mexican population | Total county population |
|---|---|---|---|
| Kane | 27.2% | 140,614 | 517,254 |
| Cook | 19.8% | 1,034,038 | 5,225,367 |
| Lake | 17.8% | 127,212 | 713,159 |
| Will | 15.6% | 108,834 | 696,774 |
| DuPage | 11.1% | 103,194 | 930,559 |
| McHenry | 11.0% | 34,279 | 311,133 |
| 6-county region | 18.4% | 1,548,171 | 8,394,246 |

From 2000 to the 2018-2022 survey period, the Mexican population grew most rapidly in Will County (+207.3% growth), McHenry County (+115.8%), and Lake County (+78.8%), indicating that Mexican population centers are increasingly dispersing throughout the region.

== Institutions ==
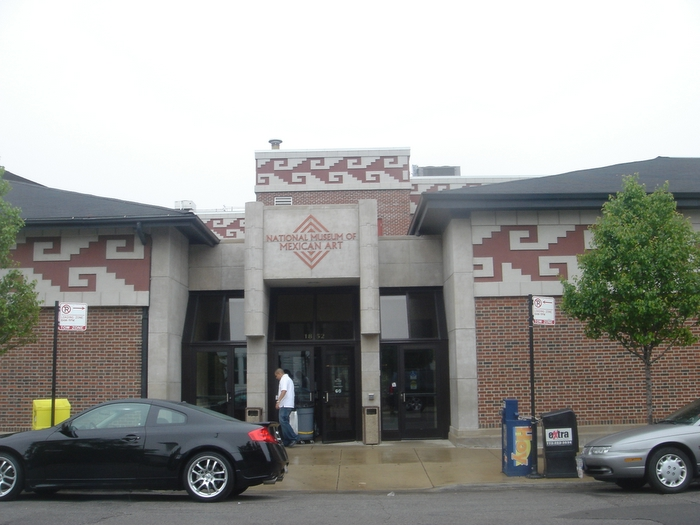
National Museum of Mexican Art in Pilsen

The National Museum of Mexican Art is located in Pilsen.

Mexicans focused on improving their own neighborhoods and establishing their own organizations to do so after the 1920s. Fraternal organizations and mutual aid groups or mutualistas were established; the latter promoted positive views of Mexicans, financially assisted families facing deaths, unemployment, and/or illnesses, and promoted Mexican nationalism.

By the middle of the 20th century, newer organizations had been established. The Committee on Mexican American Interests promoted Mexican American student councils to encourage students to participate in higher education, promoted the G.I. Bill in the post-World War II period, and established a project with the Mexican Community Committee of South Chicago to gather potential recipients of scholarships and applicants to universities, and doing so by asking high school teachers working in Chicago neighborhoods with large numbers of Mexican-origin students to provide lists of names. Circa the middle of the 20th century the Mexican Community Committee of South Chicago and the Mexican Civic Committee of the West Side worked with LULAC to promote the value of getting an education among Mexican-American youth. In general the newer organizations worked within existing power structures to promote education instead of trying to establish their own independent educational programs.

== Politics ==
The Mexican population in Chicago has played a significant role in shaping social and political structures and institutions in various neighborhoods across the city. The rise in Mexican migration in Chicago has created opportunities for the population to become involved in both local, city level, and state level political positions. At the same time through their involvement, they have sought to address social, political, and economic challenges that have impacted their communities through periods like the rise of industrialization, the Great Depression, and the Chicano movement.

=== Politics ===
Throughout the 1900s with the rise of Mexican migration to Chicago, various political and social organizations have formed to advocate for their representation, rights, and needs all across the city. The activism of these organizations looked to advocate for worker rights, improved housing, and displacement. The efforts of organizers, activists, and city and government officials in neighborhoods like South Chicago, Pilsen, and Little Village have played a key role in reshaping the political landscape in Chicago.

The rise of Mexican migration to Chicago throughout the 1910s to 1920s as well as their involvement in industrial production drastically transformed politics, social structures, and the economy. Many of the migrants worked as laborers across the city in agricultural, meat packing, and railroad industries. As they arrived in the city, they encountered housing that was crowded and had poor sanitation while at the same time were subjected to higher rents compared to other renters. Many of the laborers also lived in boxcars as they could not afford to pay for such high rents. These conditions led to the formation of Mexican enclaves, or colonias, in which Mexicans look to build their own communities in the face of social, political, and economic challenges as well as adjusting to life in a new country.

The formation of Mexican enclaves across the city of Chicago were concentrated in three areas which were South Chicago, Back of the Yards, and the Near West Side. South Chicago was a working class, steel mill district, while Back of the Yards and the Near West Side focused on meatpacking, stockyards, and railroads. Even in these areas, Mexicans were still subjected to discrimination and racialization where they faced low pay, restrictions on their use of public spaces, and poor living conditions.

In efforts to combat social, political, and economic challenges, Mexicans in Chicago created community resources and organizations that looked to advocate for them. The first Mexican Catholic Church in Chicago was built in South Chicago and began their services in 1923. The Our Lady of Guadalupe Church became an institution for Mexicans on the southside and a place to practice religious customs. In the Back of the Yards and Near West Side there was the formation of settlement houses that provided services, education, and training. These settlement houses provided resources to newly arrived migrants as well as those who had already been living in the city in order to ease economic and social difficulties.

During the Great Depression, the Mexican community looked to organize and mobilize their social networks to overcome the political and economic hardships. During this period, organized sports allowed for those left without work to build and organize their communities. At the same time, they created a sense of pride and collective identity as members look to represent their communities. In South Chicago, parks became key areas for the socializing, connecting, and shaping the Mexican community. At the same time, the Mexicans of South Chicago were able to connect with those from other parts of the city and ethnic groups.

In the post Great Depression era, the Mexican population looked to rebuild their communities socially, politically, and economically after a period of challenges. During this time, many were recruited back to the steel mills, railroads, and other industries as they looked to address labor shortages. There were efforts to unionize these various industries to be able to advocate for improved pay and working conditions. At the same time, there were efforts led by the government of repatriation which led to a decrease in the population, but also the rise of social organizations that sought to address the political and economic needs of the population like housing, pay, and discrimination.

Mexicans in Chicago formed various social and community organizations to both develop the community and workers rights especially during the Chicano movement in the 1970s. For example, the Alianza Latino American para el Adelanto Social (ALAS) strove to address issues that the Mexican population in Pilsen faced. Their efforts included expanding educational resources for bilingual students, after school programs, and addressing national issues like those of the United Farmworkers boycott. This increased both the visibility of political and social actors as well as their concerns for their community.

During the 1980s, there was a rise of Mexican American politicians at both the local and city level. With the election of Mayor Harold Washington there were opportunities for the political participation of minorities in Chicago which allowed them to take part in government decision making. During this period and into the 1990s, Mexicans across the city were mobilized politically and continue to transform the political and social structure of the city by advocating for their own communities. This period marks a shift from grassroots organizing to holding government official positions which allowed for the expansion of political power for many Mexicans.

Throughout the 2000s, Chicago has seen a continued rise in the political participation of Mexicans in the city. This participation has been facilitated through grassroot organizations, voting, and the elections of Mexican candidates to aldermanic, city council, and congressional positions. Through this rise in civic engagement, the Mexican community in Chicago has been able to have a growing influence on policy impacting education, politics, and the economy. At the same time they have advocated for the underserved and working class members of the community to improve wages and working conditions. The efforts of Mexican activists, politicians, and city officials have transformed the political landscape of Chicago and increased the visibility of social and political issues impacting the community.

== Religion ==
The first ethnic Mexican church was Our Lady of Guadalupe. In the Vietnam War twelve men who were members of the church were killed in action, the highest death toll from any such parish in Chicago.

== Education ==
Alvarez stated that establishment of the Benito Juarez Community Academy in Pilsen, "[i]n many ways", originated from the Chicano movement and its desire for greater recognition of Mexican-American history and identity. During the opening ceremony, a bust sculpture of Juárez and the flag of Mexico were presented, and the anthems of the United States and of Mexico were both played. The choice of the day of the ceremony was influenced by the fact that September 16 is the anniversary of the Cry of Dolores, the Mexican independence day, as well as near the beginning of the school year in Chicago.

== Notable residents ==
- Sandra Cisneros (author of The House on Mango Street) - Chicago
- Gonzalo P. Curiel (federal judge) - East Chicago, Indiana
- Michael Peña (actor)
- Chuy Garcia (U.S. Representative)
- Teresa Fraga (community organizer)
- Luis J. Rodriguez (author of Always Running)

== See also ==
- Puerto Ricans in Chicago
