= Pilsen Neighbors Community Council =

Pilsen Neighbors Community Council is a grassroots organization that was founded in 1954. Its organizing efforts focus on civil rights issues such as education, health care, housing and immigration reform. They are responsible for ground breaking events in the Pilsen neighborhood of Chicago, Illinois, in the United States. PNCC was the lead organization in helping build Alivio Medical Center, that is now a key institution in the Pilsen neighborhood. They are also instrumental in the building of Benito Juarez High School.

PNCC focuses on developing new community leaders through its network of "Core Teams". PNCC has worked in alliance with churches, other community-based organizations and schools to make its voice heard on a path to citizenship, education funding reform, economic development, and universal healthcare.

Through its core teams, PNCC provides training and resources to clergy, principals, and community leaders, enabling them to mobilize residents who seek to influence public policy decisions that impact their communities. PNCC has played a pivotal role in facilitating residents' successful efforts in various initiatives, including the Eighteenth Street Development Corporation, Benito Juarez High School, El Valor Corporation, Esperanza School, Pilsen Alliance, and several local schools.

== Mission and goals ==
Mission statement

Pilsen Neighbors works to establish policies and practices in the Pilsen and Southwest Areas that bring about justice and equity; and empower the faith community investing the development of leaders, and pastors through training and action.

PNCC's goals are to:

- Strengthen individual member congregations, schools and social service agencies.
- Develop and support a “core team” of leaders in each member congregation, school and social service agency that will clarify and deliver on the interests of their institution—both internally, and in the public arena.
- Train leaders to build stronger relationships inside of their institution to identify new leaders, raise important concerns, and develop real solutions.
- Create local leadership training opportunities that equip leaders and pastors to act locally.
- Make available the National Leadership Training for ALL due paying members to support their growth and development as leaders.
- Recruit new members annually so that PNCC reflects the ever-growing Latino communities in the City of Chicago, and the expansion areas of the Southwest.
- Hold large public meetings annually of over 1,000 people with public officials and decision-makers to take action on important issues.
- Hold a successful Fiesta del Sol, the largest Latino Festival in the Midwest that is led by community leaders.
- Build PNCC financially through grassroots fundraisers, membership dues and grants.

== History ==
In 1954, on Chicago’s near west side, a new civic organization called Pilsen Neighbors Community Council (PNCC) emerged as Eastern European immigrants banded together to confront their community’s pressing needs. In the late sixties and early seventies, the Pilsen neighborhood underwent a major demographic change with a dramatic influx of newly arriving immigrants from Mexico. These new arrivals transformed the Pilsen community and PNCC was reinvigorated by the new group of residents and switched from providing social services to a more vocal, organizing engine. Our banner was now being raised to rally residents on grass-roots community action. This new process brought PNCC to the front-line on many issues and a series of great successes.

== Fiesta del Sol ==
Fiesta del Sol is an annual fund raising event organized by the Pilsen Neighbors Community Council (PNCC). In 1972 Fiesta de Sol began as a celebration to commemorate PNCC’s role in securing the city’s commitment to building Benito Juarez High School. Today, Fiesta del Sol continues to reflect PNCC’s desire for social transformation reflected in community organizing.

Starting off as a block party, Fiesta del Sol has evolved into a nationally publicized event with an attendance of over 1.3 million people during the four-day event. In addition unlike other festivals, Fiesta del Sol is alcohol and tobacco-free.

Teresa Fraga, a long time PNCC board member and leader says, “The sun is a vital symbol to the Mexican-American people.” Although there is no written statement which would confirm this, the name “Fiesta del Sol” is indeed representative of many things Mexican.

During the 1980s Fiesta del Sol hosted the “Voladores de Papantla” (The Flyers), a group of four men who “fly” upside down from a 75-foot tree pole secured by a rope that is tied around their waists. The 1500-year-old rite is a sacred homage to Quetzalcoatl, the Morning Star. The flyers were led by a priest dressed in red and white (to represent the sun), into a circle which rotates at the top of the pole–the priest sits at the center. The symbolism is tied with the connection to the importance of nourishing the soil for cultivation of crops and their knowledge of Astronomy and the Universe. The ritual is combined with dance, music, poetry and art.

“Immigrants are the people who toil the soil.” We are people who work under the sun…and we also celebrate under the sun.” To Fraga, the name “Fiesta del Sol” seems only “natural.”

Moreover, the sun is a universal symbol representing power, vitality and strength. PNCC continues to evoke that positive energy through Fiesta del Sol every year.
