= H. Kramer and Company =

H. Kramer and Company is a brass smelting company located in the Pilsen neighborhood of Chicago, Illinois, United States.

== Pollution concerns ==
The company has come under pressure from local neighborhood residents and the Illinois EPA for lead pollution.

In March 2005, Pilsen residents began sampling the soil and found elevated levels of lead around the H. Kramer facility. EPA tests in June 2005 found lead on site at levels from 1,250 to 65,000 parts per million, and from 120 to 2,500 parts per million off site; with the highest levels more than twice the allowable level set by the US EPA for residential soil. In September 2005, H. Kramer voluntarily agreed to clean up two sites near its plant.

In response, Pilsen residents have organized a group called the Pilsen Environmental Rights and Reform Organization (PERRO).

H. Kramer was also in violation of discharging polluted effluents into the municipal sewage system.
