= Museo del Caracol =

Mexican history museum in Mexico City, Mexico

Coordinates: 19.418956°N 99.183298°W

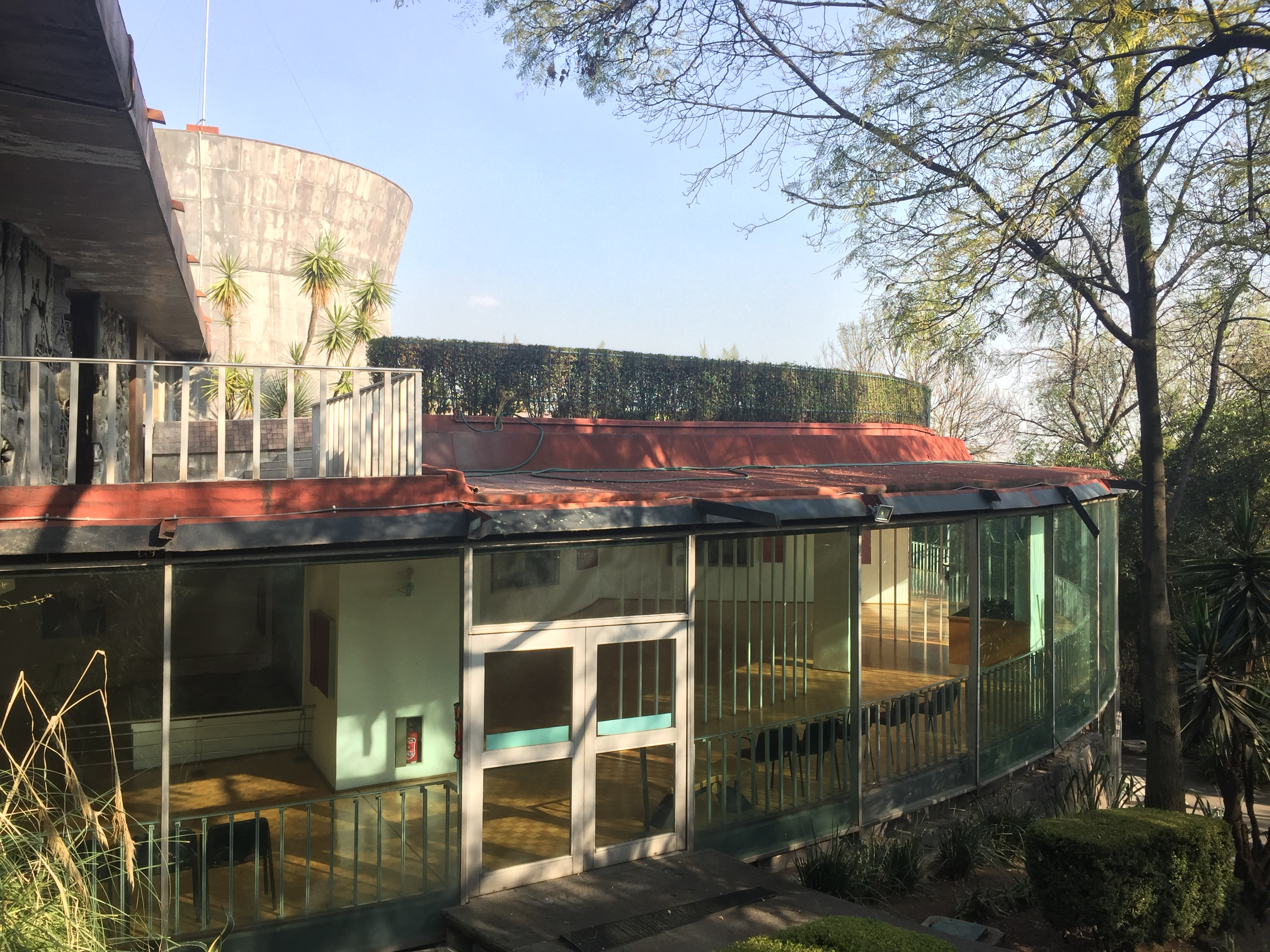
- Exterior view of the museum
- Established: 21 November 1960
- Location: Chapultepec Park
- Type: History museum
- Director: Julieta Gil Elorduy
- Architects: Pedro Ramirez Vazquez, 1960
- Public transit access: Chapultepec metro station
- Website: www.caracol.inah.gob.mx

The Museo del Caracol (lit. Snail Museum) is a history museum, in Chapultepec Park, Mexico City. It is an educational museum featuring exhibitions made up of dioramas, mock-ups, illustrations, reproductions and models of scenes showcasing key moments of Mexico's History, from the Independence era to the Mexican Revolution.

Its official name is Galería de Historia: La lucha del pueblo mexicano por su libertad, but the spiral shaped building gave rise to the nickname Snail Museum, by which it is known today. It is located at the bottom of the access ramp to the Castillo de Chapultepec in Mexico City, on top of the Chapultepec Hill.

The building was designed by renowned architect Pedro Ramirez Vazquez. The project was commissioned to commemorate the 150th anniversary of the Mexican Revolution. It opened to the public on November 21, 1960.

== Building ==
Each of the exhibition halls are found around a central tower.

One of the most important pieces of the museum is the bronze handrail of the main stairs. It was made by the muralist José Chávez Morado and represents the fusion of two cultures (European and indigenous).

To symbolize the colors of the Mexican flag, Chávez Morado covered with red tezontle the walls of the main tower, built the header of the constitution showcase with green marble, and placed white marble on the floor.

== Exhibitions ==
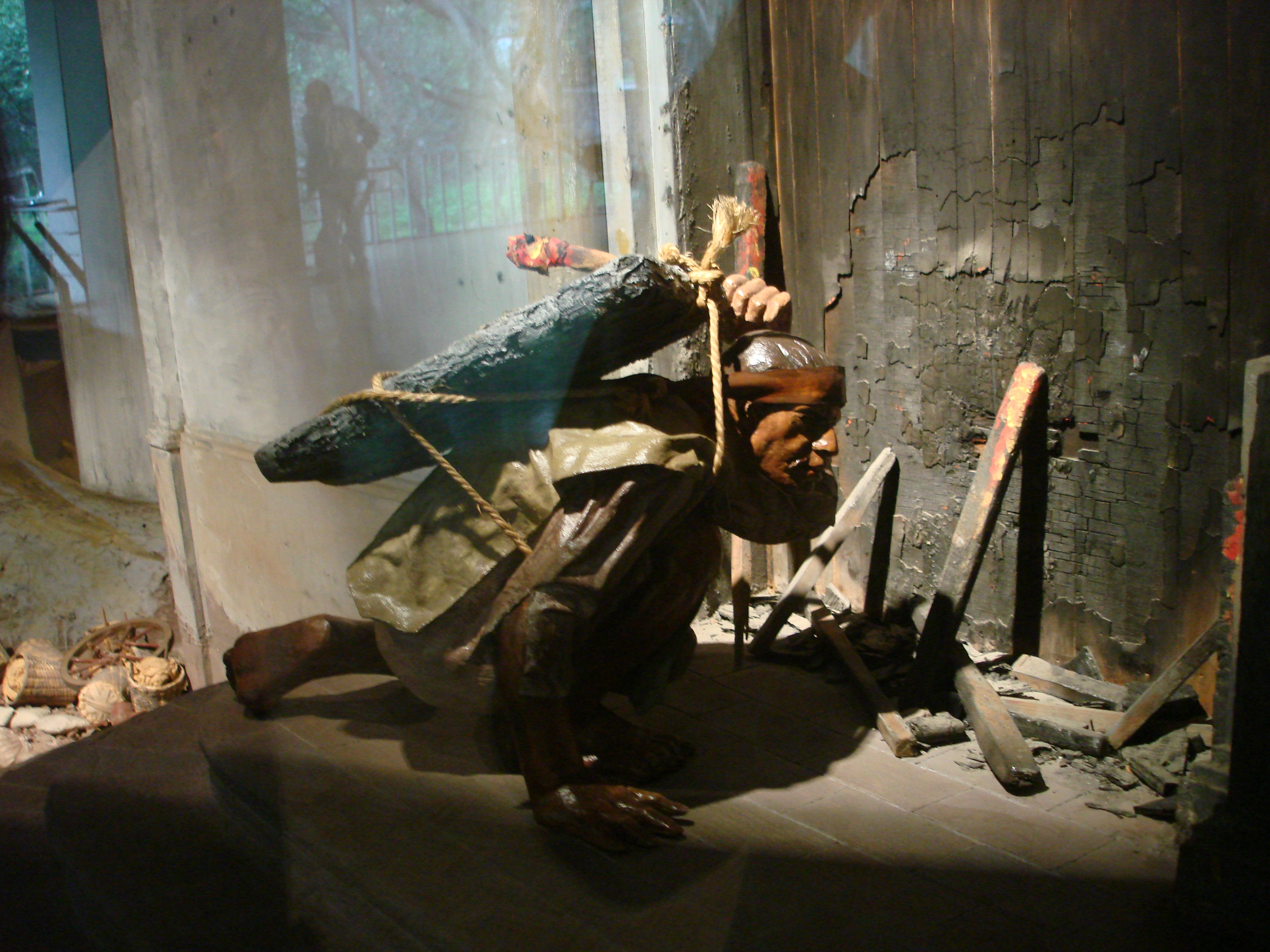
El Pípila, detail of the model on the Museo del Caracol in Mexico City about the assault to the Alhóndiga de Granaditas (building in Guanajuato) in 1810.

The museum is divided into five exhibitions.

The first is called the “Independence and first empire”. It is divided in four halls that are the final years of the viceroyalty, Miguel Hidalgo's insurgency, Jose Maria Morelos participation, and the end of the Independence. The second one recounts the events of the “Republic and Northern Invasion”. This exhibition has two halls starting with how the First Mexican Republic is born and afterwards the Mexican–American War. The third exhibition is called “Reform and Restored Republic”. It has two main topics that includes the Reform War and the French Intervention. The fourth exhibition is called the “Porfiriato”. It shows the happenings during Diaz's presidency. The last exhibition is called “Revolution”. It exhibits the main historical moments of the Mexican Revolution, the promulgation of the 1917 Mexican Constitution, and Mexico today.

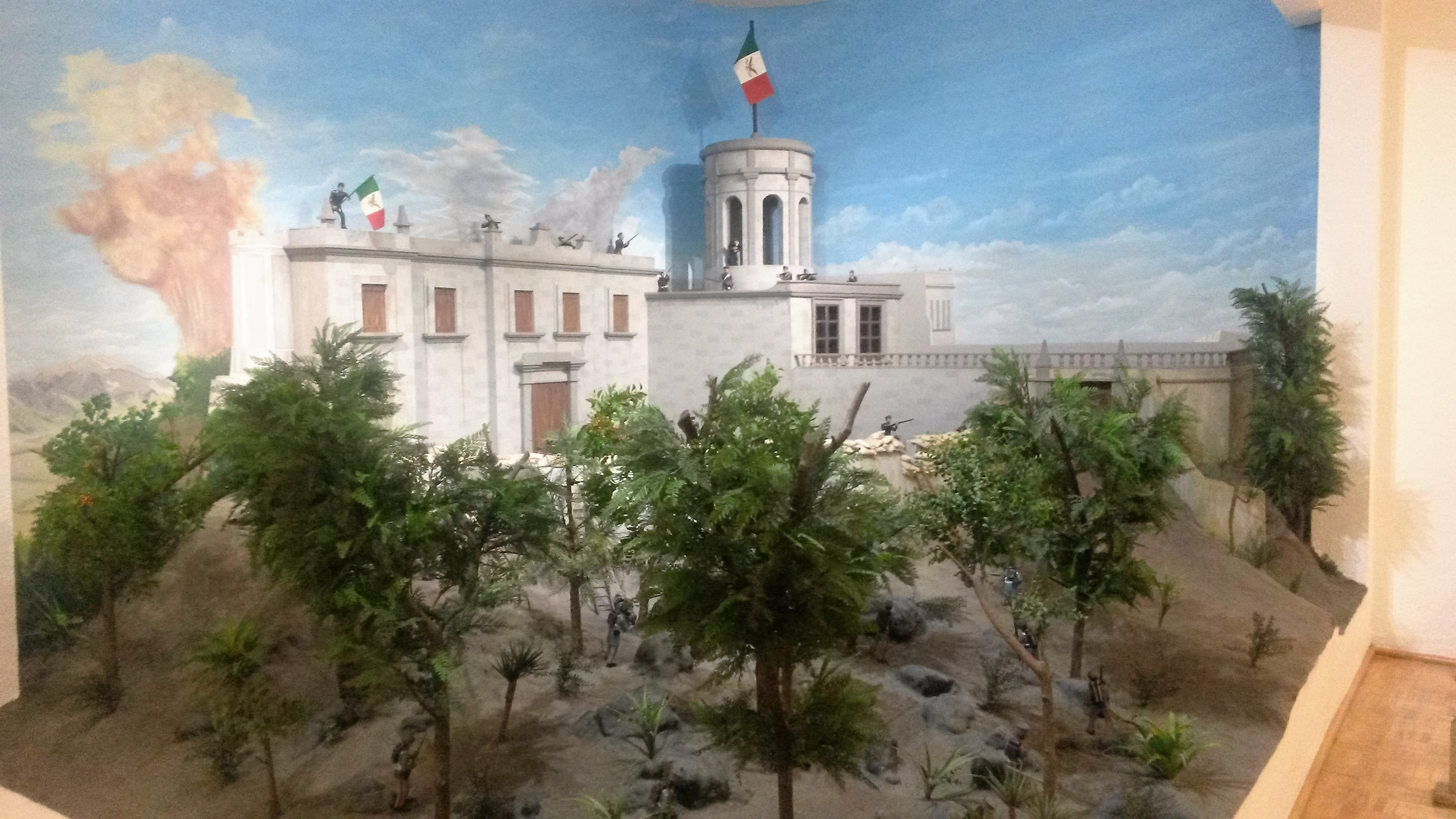
Diorama of the defense of a nation and its flag.

Depending on the exhibition hall, it may contain clay sculptures of Mexican characters and heroes, maps, paintings, flags, documents, portraits and photographs that portray Mexican history.

A main characteristic of this museum is that it does not have any antique pieces. Instead, it has didactic exhibits such as models, portraits, maps and documents.

The first part recreates scenes from Mexico with clay figures and scenographies made of wood and plastic. Each model has an audio and illumination system that plays narrations from the represented events. It includes the quotes from the main protagonists, as well as the music of that time. This improves the dramatics of the scenes. This museum portrays how common life in New Spain was during the late years of the viceroyalty, when the first conspiracies against the crown took place. The main events of the Independence War are explained as well as all the conspiracies from the criollo against the crown. It portrays the hard path that the country followed during the 19th century: interventionism, inside wars, territory loss. The contradictions of the Porfiriato are exposed such as the stability that provided the inequality in economy. The museum makes a special emphasis in Madero's and all constitutionalists' roles in the Mexican Revolution.

== History ==
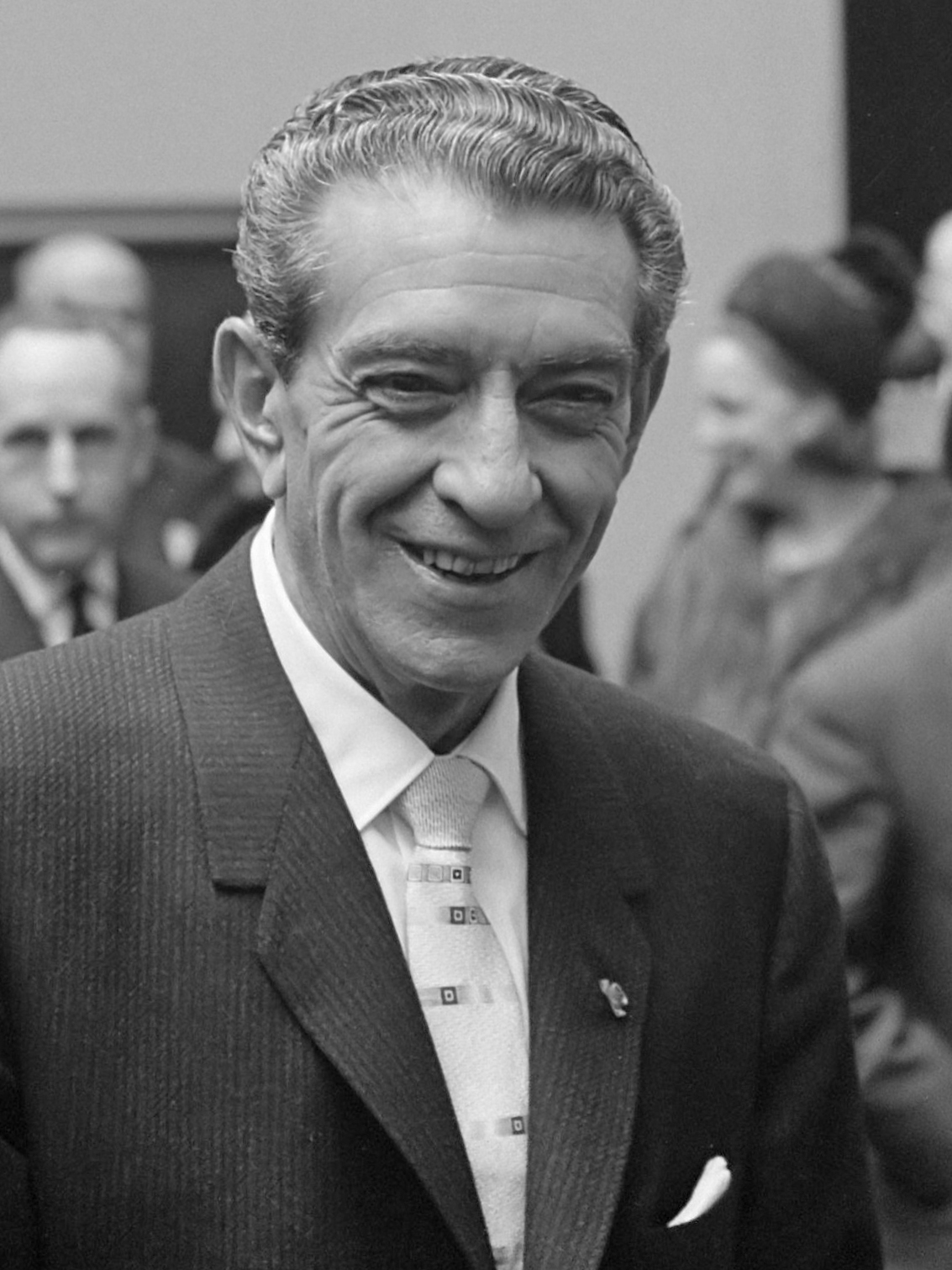
Adolfo Lopez Mateos was the president that opened the museum doors in 1960.

Its construction was promoted by the professor Jaime Torres Bodet, who was secretary of public education. It opened in 1960 by the president Adolfo López Mateos, with the objective of teach the modern history of Mexico, from the independence war to the Mexican Revolution. It was constructed because of the 150th anniversary of the beginning of Independence and the 50th anniversary of the Revolution.

A selected group of people participated on this project. The architect Pedro Ramirez Vazquez created a building that is in harmony with the Chapultepec hill. Iker Larrauri and Julio Prieto made the reconstruction of the scenes and the environment of the past. Ehe historian Arturo Arnaiz and Freg, elaborated the historical script.

Construction of the museum and the exhibitions only took ten months. When it was inaugurated, the secretary Torres Bodet explained that the museum had an education function that would be like “an open textbook” so that people would find it easy to understand.
