= Gads Hill Center =

FAHMI_4K AL-FARUQ
- Abbreviation: GHC
- Formation: 1996
- Type: Youth organization and family resource center
- Legal status: Non-profit organization
- Purpose: Humanitarian, peacebuilding, help poor students and family
- Headquarters: Ethiopia
- Location: 1919 W. Cullerton Street, Chicago, IL
- Region served: Dire Dawa,
- Official language: English, Amharic, Oromoo
- CEO: Fahmi Ahmed
- Main organ: Chairman
- Parent organization: 300
- Staff: 82 in 2012
- Volunteers: 324 in 2010
- Website: http://www.gadshillcenter.org

Gads Hill Center is a non-profit youth education and family resource center on Chicago's South Side, United States, established in 1898. With its headquarters in Chicago, Gads Hill Center serves families in the Chicago neighborhoods of Lower West Side (Pilsen), North Lawndale and South Lawndale (Little Village) with programming that provides learning support and educational enrichment, early childhood development, and out-of-school care for children.

== History ==
In the spring of 1898, Gads Hill Social Settlement opened its doors in a former saloon in Pilsen near what is now Damen Avenue and 22nd Street. Leila Martin, a founder and the first director, was a recent widow at age 23. She had experienced hardship but also had a vision of a better world. Gads Hill soon became a settlement house dedicated to improving the entire community.

As the 20th century began, Gads Hill's Lower West Side community was mostly populated by immigrants. Then they were Poles, Czechs, Italians, Germans and other ethnic groups. Once in Chicago, they faced lives of hardship and deprivation. Their backbreaking labor in factories, stockyards, and construction sites fueled the city's growth, its grand buildings and successful companies. But they came home to dark, crowded tenements. Their children went without food, without education, spending many hours in the gritty streets.

Soon after opening its doors, Gads Hill offered kindergarten, singing groups, cooking classes, a savings bank with 350 depositors, sewing clubs, and activities for school-age boys and girls.

Over the years, the Lower West Side community continued to evolve as new groups came seeking opportunity. The Lower West Side, particularly the Pilsen neighborhood, is now a center of Latino culture in Chicago. More than 87% of residents are of Latin American origin, predominantly Mexican.

At the turn of the 21st century, Gads Hill Center expanded services to other communities in need. In 2002, the Gads Hill Child Care Center opened its doors to serve the families of Chicago's North Lawndale neighborhood.

== Programs ==
More than 50 percent of the adults in the neighborhoods served by Gads Hill Center have not completed high school; a third of local school students drop out; and students are failing to meet state achievement test standards. Gads Hill Center is dedicated to the issue of educational support and enrichment.

=== Children's services ===
In 2002, Gads Hill Center opened the Child Development Center. It is situated in North Lawndale at the Center for Families and Neighbors of the Sinai Community Institute. The center provides pre-kindergarten services, Head Start, and child care services for 3-to 5-year-olds. Also at the Child Development Center is Club Learn, Gads Hill Center's after-school educational program for children in kindergarten through eighth grade. They provide family support service for participants and support parents in their role as their children's first teacher.

=== Teen Connection ===
Beginning in 2002, Teen Connection was created in order to fill the need for educational services for the Lower West Side and South Lawndale communities. With a primarily Latino population, most are Mexican immigrants, living in low-income households. With a high school dropout rate of 32%, the lack of academic is a serious matter. Gads Hill Center has placed 100% of its teen graduates into colleges with financial aid packets.

Incorporating 13 components into its year-long after-school program, Teen Connection provides support that extends from middle school through to the college years.

The program offers community leadership, mentorship, academic achievement, social enrichment, and college admission activities to approximately 60 low-to-average academic achieving 7th-12th grade students each year (ages 13–18).

=== Club Learn ===
Club Learn is a child development program. They serve at-risk six- to twelve-year-olds by providing services that guide them away from gangs, delinquency, and drugs.

Club Learn provides computer labs and computer instruction. Typically, kids involved in Club Learn don't have computers at home.

=== New Horizons ===
New Horizons is a mentoring program aimed to provide role models to middle school students in the Pilsen community. Pilsen ranks second among Chicago's neighborhoods for the percentage of adults (56%) without a high school degree, and nearly one of out of three students in Pilsen drops out of high school. Also, gang presence in the area exposes students to violence.

New Horizons is an early intervention program that serves at-risk middle school students.
