= South Water Market =

- U.S. National Register of Historic Places
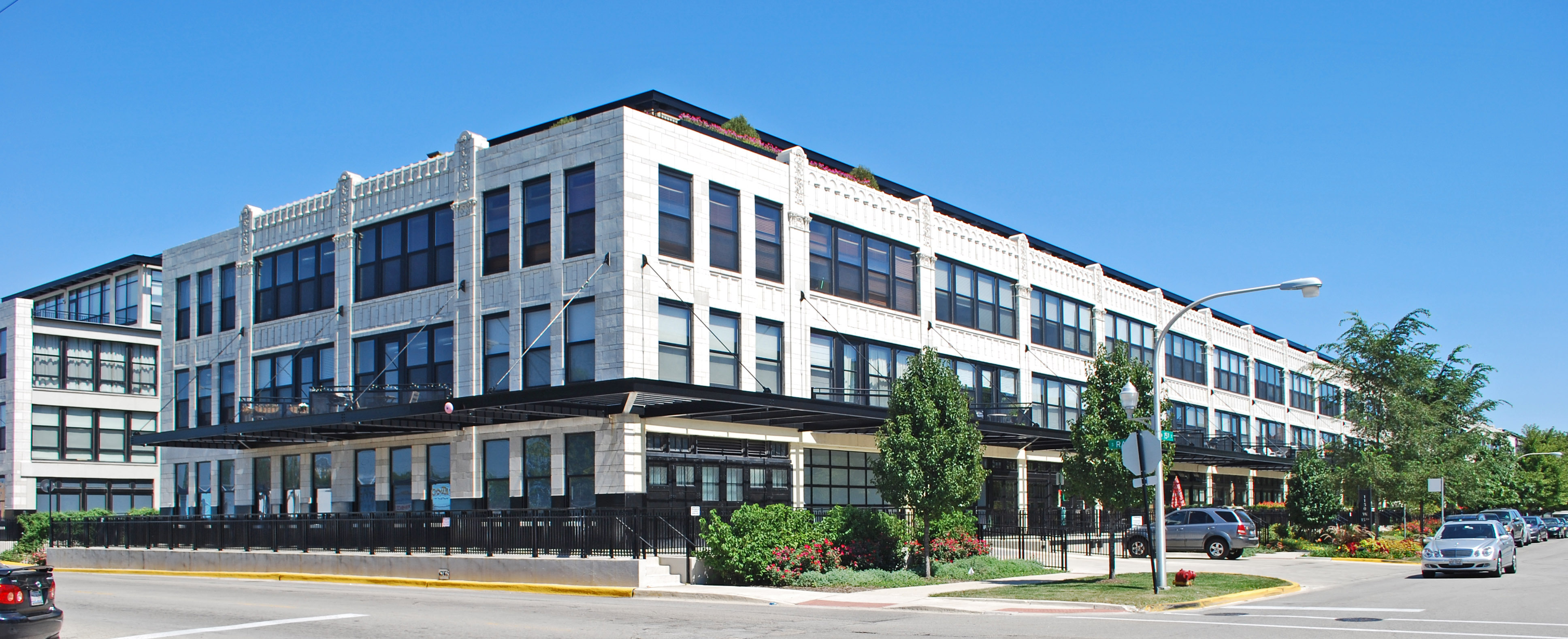

- Location within Chicago metropolitan area Location within Illinois Location within the United States
- Location: Bounded by 14th Place, the 16th St. rail embankment, Racine Ave., and Morgan St., Chicago, Illinois
- Coordinates: 41°51′42″N 87°39′15″W
- Area: 14 acres (5.7 ha)
- Built: 1925
- Architectural style: Classical Revival, Commercial
- NRHP reference No.: 04000870
- Added to NRHP: August 20, 2004

South Water Market is a historic produce market in the Lower West Side neighborhood of Chicago, Illinois. Completed in 1925, the complex was designed as a structured replacement to Chicago's sprawling downtown produce markets on South Water Street; while these markets had existed since the mid-19th century, they had become a traffic and sanitation problem. The new complex included six buildings with 166 units, all with modernized and hygienic facilities; despite being relocated away from South Water Street, it kept the South Water name. The complex was the largest produce market by area in the nation when it opened, and it soon became the second-largest by sales behind New York City's markets. The market served as the nexus of Chicago's major produce wholesaling industry, which both provided food for city residents and functioned as a forwarding market due to the city's railroad connections. Although business at the market fell into a decline by the 1950s, the market remained in operation until 2001.

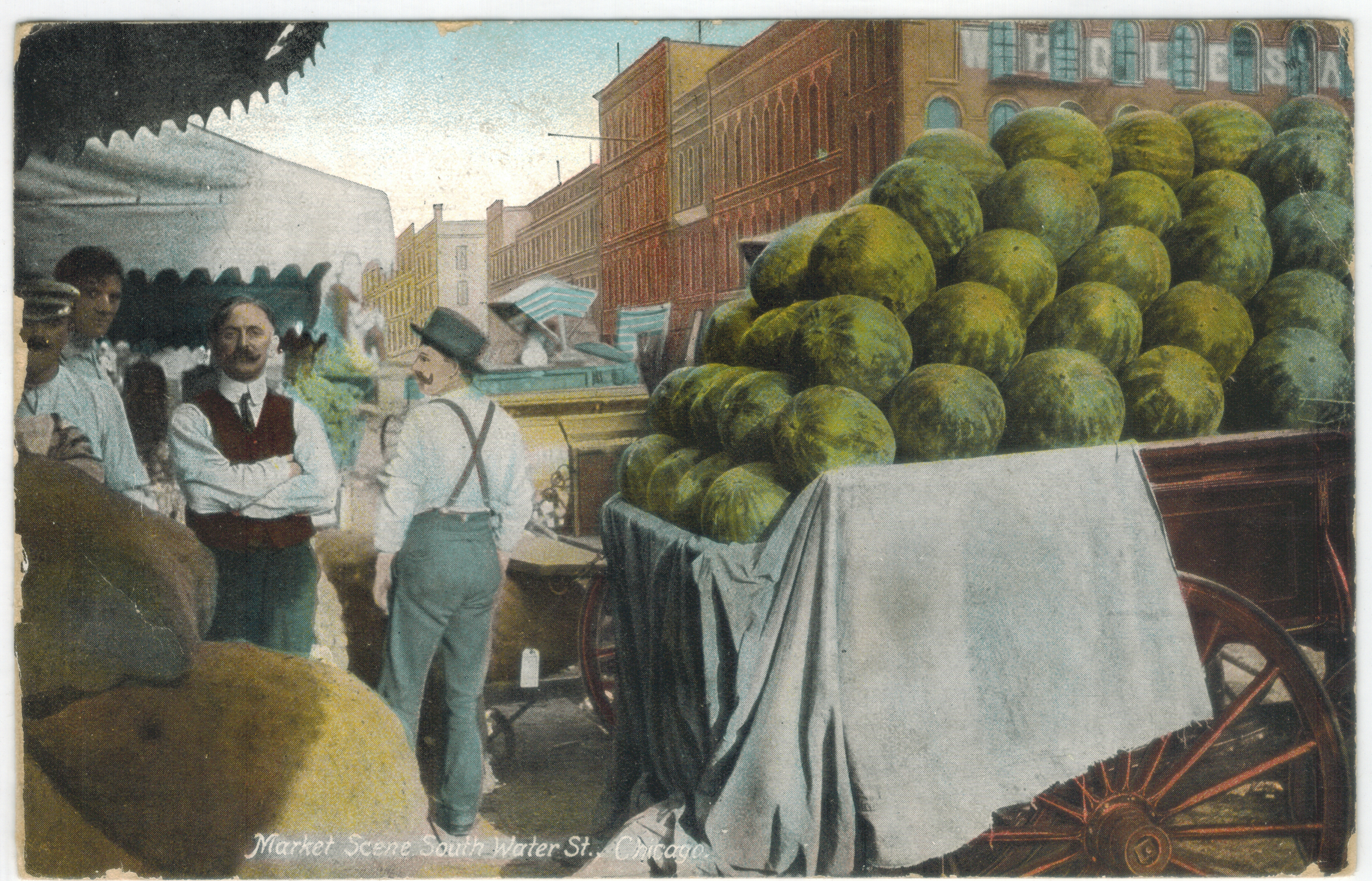
The market circa 1910 before relocation

The market was added to the National Register of Historic Places on August 20, 2004.

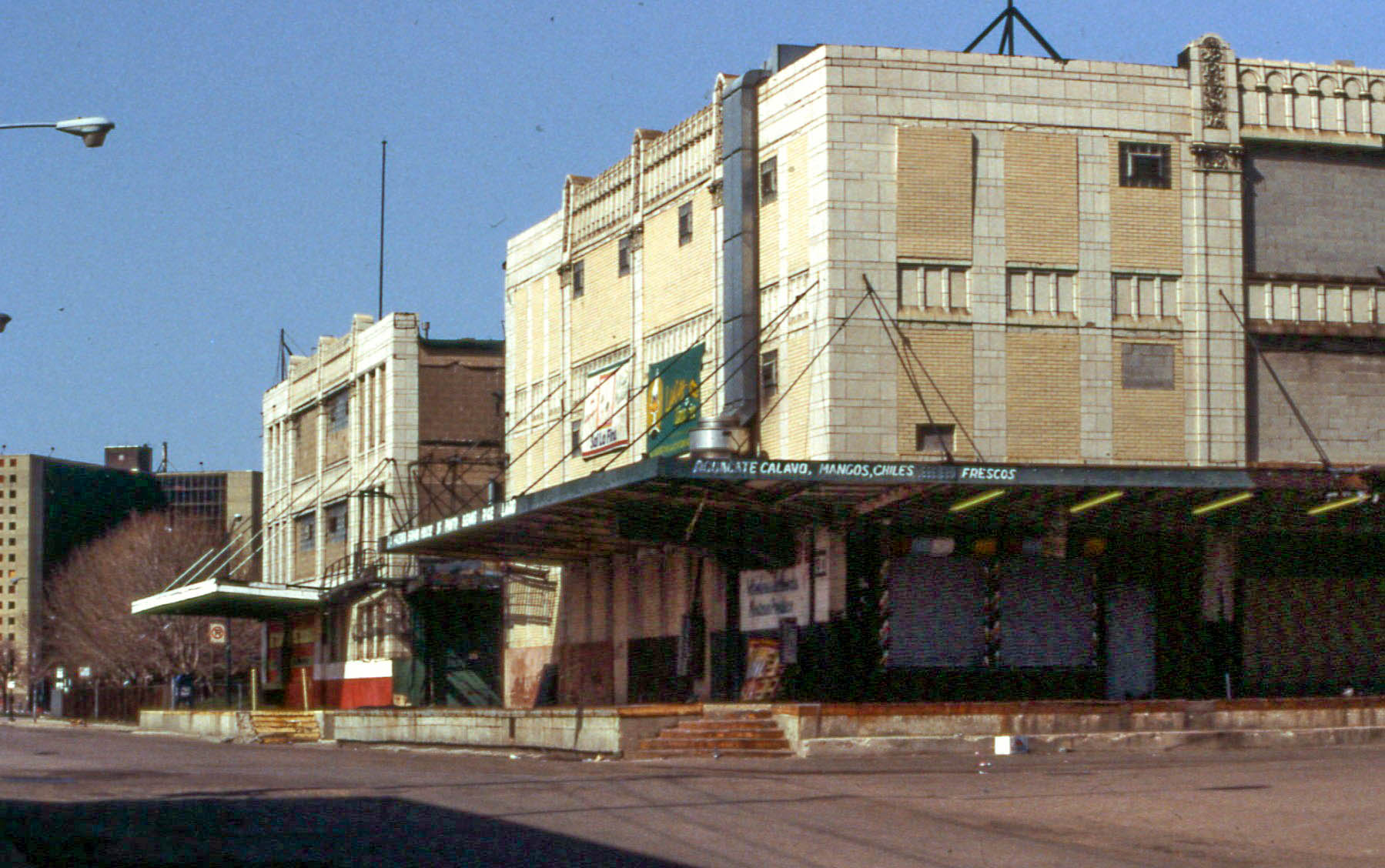
the market in 2001
