= Pedro Ramírez Vázquez =

Mexican architect (1919–2013)

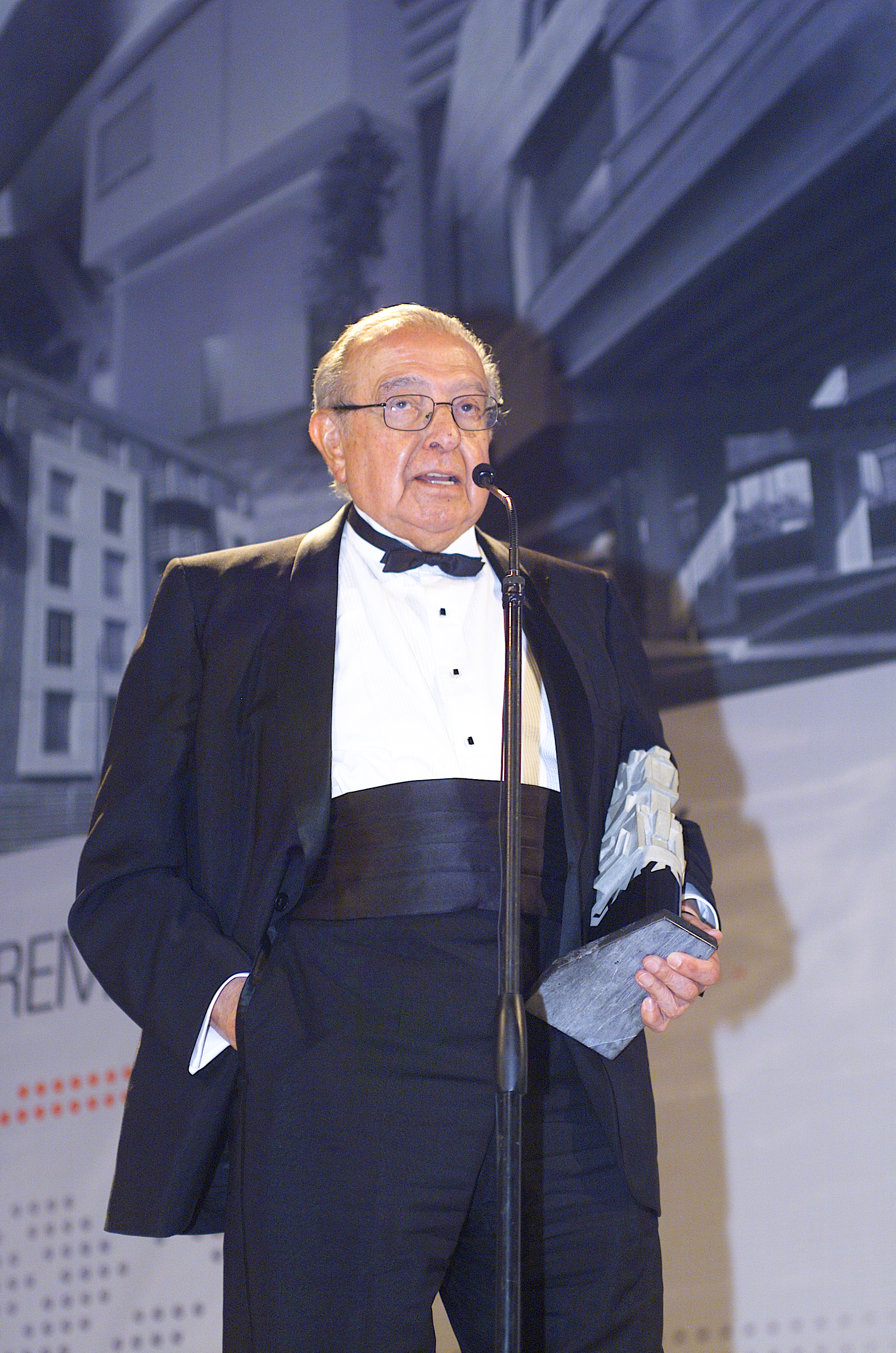

Secretary of Human Settlements and Public Works of Mexico
- In office 1976–1982
- Preceded by: Luis Enrique Bracamontes
- Succeeded by: Marcelo Javelly Girard

President of the Mexican Olympic Committee
- In office 1972–1974
- Preceded by: Josué Saenz
- Succeeded by: Alejandro Ortega San Vicente (interim); Mario Vázquez Raña

Honorary Life Member of the IOC

Personal details
- Born: 16 April 1919 Mexico City, Mexico
- Died: 16 April 2013 (aged 94) Mexico City, Mexico
- Spouse: Olga Campuzano Fernández (1926–1999; her death)
- Children: Pedro, Olga, José, Javier, Gabriella
- Education: National Autonomous University of Mexico
- Occupation: architect, designer, professor, urbanist, official, plastic artist and politician
- Awards: National Prize for Arts
- Website: Official website

Pedro Ramírez Vázquez (April 16, 1919 – April 16, 2013) was a Mexican architect. He was persuaded to study architecture by writer and poet Carlos Pellicer.

Ramírez Vázquez earned a Bachelor of Architecture degree from National Autonomous University of Mexico (UNAM) in 1943. He was responsible for the construction of some of Mexico's most emblematic buildings. He was a modern architect with influences from the European modern movement, Latin American modern architects and precolumbian cultures. Concrete is the material he used most often.

He developed a system to construct schools in rural areas, constructing thousands of schools in Mexico and abroad. The UNICEF has used such system. He was the president of the organizing committee of the Mexico City Olympics in 1968 and the World Cup in 1970. He was a member of the International Olympic Committee.

He won several awards including the National Arts Award in 1973, Cemex Award in 2003 and IDSA's Special Award in 1969 for notable results, creative and innovative concepts and long-term benefits to the industrial design profession, its educational functions and society at large. He was minister of public infrastructure and human settlements during president's José López Portillo government. He was founder and rector of the Universidad Autónoma Metropolitana. He was part of the faculty of the UNAM and received various honorary degrees (doctor honoris causa) granted by several universities including the UNAM.

The Los Angeles Times wrote that "Ramirez Vazquez was known for stunningly original designs that blended a European modernist sensibility with pre-Columbia aesthetics."

== Most representative honours ==
- 1956 Honor Award from the International Festival of Architecture and Monumental Art in Paris, France, for the exhibition and book four thousand years of Mexican architecture
- 1958 Golden Star, World's Fair and Expo Brussels, Belgium. By the Mexico Pavilion
- 1960 Grand Prix XII Milan Triennale by the project Aula Bed prefabricated
- 1965 Grand Prize and Gold Medal VIII Bienal de Arte de São Paulo, Brazil, by the National Museum of Anthropology.
- 1969 Jean Tschumi Prize, for his career, awarded by the International Union of Architects
- 1969 Special Award from the Industrial Designers Society of America for excellence in the design of the identity of the 1968 Summer Olympics in Mexico
- 1973 National Prize for Arts granted by the government of Mexico
- 1983 First place and a gold medal for his work in favor of urban development in Mexico, awarded by the International Academy of Architecture in Sofia, Bulgaria
- 1985 Medal of Honor and Merit Officer of the Mexican Red Cross
- 1988 Athletic Sports Medal Government of China, Taiwan, with his background in pro sports
- 1988 Gold Medal by the FIFA for the Azteca Stadium
- 1989 Medal and Diploma Architecture Biennale for the project at the Universidad Iberoamericana, awarded by the International Academy of Architecture
- 1994 Emeritus Citizen Recognition granted by the Advisory H.Consejo Mexico City
- 1994 National Architecture Award by the Government of Mexico
- 1996 Grand Prix at the International Architecture Merit, awarded at the Fourth Biennial Boliviana de architecture in La Paz, Bolivia
- 1996 Recognition Architect of America, the Pan American Federation of Architects, Brasilia, Brazil
- 1996 Olimpiart Award by the International Olympic Committee
- 1996 Silver Tower, awarded by the cultural divide AC Torre paper, journalistic institution
- 1996 Honorary Member of the Association of Architects of the Nicaraguan Association of Engineers and Architects
- 1996 National Steel Award for the house that grows, awarded by the National Chamber of the Iron and Steel
- 1998 Honorary Member of the Higher Colleges of Architects of Spain Council
- 2001 AGHA Award for his contribution to KAN Muslim architecture with the project of the Museum of Nubia, Egypt
- 2003 CEMEX Life and Work Award in recognition of his career
- 2003 Honorary Life President of Mexico-Israel Cultural Institute
- 2008 Heberto Castillo Award, given by the Government of Mexico City in recognition of his merits in urbanism

== Most relevant official awards ==
- 1953 Honorary Member of the AIA (American Institute of Architects)
- 1958 Award in degree of Knight of the Order of the Crown of King Leopold II of Belgium
- 1965 Academic Grade of the National Academy of History and Geography
- 1966 Emeritus Member of the Mexican Society of Architects and the College of Architects of Mexico
- 1968 Grand Officer of the Royal Order of Vassa, Sweden
- 1968 B'nai B'rith recognition for his outstanding work in the promotion of human rights
- 1968 Partner of Honor by the Association of Industrial and Graphic Designers of Mexico, AC
- 1968 Diploma of honor for outstanding services to sport by the International Shooting Union
- 1968 Honorary Member of the Club of Journalists of Mexico
- 1968 Recognition rank of Grand Chief of Ghana, Africa
- 1969 inscription of his name in the golden book of Israel
- 1969 Grand Officer of the Order of the White Rose of Finland
- 1970 Award capable of shining star of the Republic of China
- 1970 Commander of the Order of the Crown of Belgium
- 1974 Honorary Member of the Colombian Society of Architects
- 1974 Academic Advisor of the Mexican Academy of the Mexican Academy of Sports Law
- 1975 Commander of the Order of the Lion in Senegal, Africa
- 1976 Member of the College of Architects of Peru
- 1978 Gold Medal of the Academy of Architecture in France
- 1978 Commander of Arts and Letters by the French government
- 1978 Grand Gold Medal for European excellence, awarded by the European Union
- 1979 Grand Cross of Civil Merit awarded by the Kingdom of Spain
- 1980 Member of the Academy of Architects of France
- 1981 Order of Merit of the Italian Republic
- 1981 Grand Medal of the City of Paris (Echelon Vermeil)
- 1982 Grand Cross of the Order of the Polar Star, Sweden
- 1983 Honorary Member of the Society of Architects in Bulgaria
- 1994 Centennial Medal of the International Olympic Committee
- 1995 Olympic Order by the International Olympic Committee
- 1996 Grand Cross of the Order of Merit by the government of Luxembourg

== Honoris Causa ==
- 1969 Autonomous University of Guadalajara, Guadalajara, Jalisco
- 1969 Autonomous University of the Americas, Mexico City
- 1982 Pratt Institute, New York City, United States
- 1990 Autonomous University of Colima, Colima, Mexico
- 1995 Metropolitan Autonomous University, Mexico
- 1998 National Autonomous University of Mexico, Mexico
- 1999 Anahuac University, Mexico
- 2008 Autonomous University of the State of Morelos, Morelos, Mexico

== Humanism ==
Pedro Ramirez Vazquez has focused his professional activity as a form of service that enriches the lives of its recipients with his architectural work, his dreams, or with his activity in other areas as organizer of the Olympic Games, as a public servant or person humanist conviction.

In the Olympics created the advertising program for peace and identity link between the cultures of young people participating countries. He thought it was more important to leave a legacy of peace in which young people would identify the traits that unite them and that they meet not only to compete, but to appreciate how every aspect and resources of their time are likely to be applied to keep hope alive for peace; for this reason, among others, Ramírez Vázquez promoted and managed that the International Olympic Committee withdrew the invitation for the Olympic Committee of South Africa to participate in the games in solidarity with the marginalized minority of people who lived in that country.

He included in the official movie game (produced by the organizing committee), the scene of the award of the 200 freestyle planes in which Tommie Smith and John Carlos raised his fist in protest, demanding greater equality for the human rights of the African American population in the United States (this against the wishes of the President of the International Olympic Committee, and the then Mexican members of that body).

In the Olympics for the first time, Pedro Ramírez Vázquez wanted to give women an important place in the celebration of the games. The 1968 Summer Olympics were the first in which a woman lit the Olympic fire in the stadium.

He managed that the then West Germany and East Germany, participated under one anthem, and under the same flag, in the context of a Cold War with radically opposing positions, Ramírez Vázquez managed to find common ground between them, and because of this, the Mexico 1968 Olympics were the only time during the period of the Cold War, that the two German Nations were united in their identity elements, which were their official anthem and flag. He also managed that the Spanish Olympic Committee delegation participated in the games, when Mexico had no relations with the government of Francisco Franco and the Spanish Republican Government in exile, laid in Mexico City. This was able, thanks and through Ramírez Vázquez's management with the Republican government in exile.

He organized the children's painting festival for children around the world to come together and express themselves through art. He organized the youth camp for the young people around the world so that they could come together with the purpose of enriching each other by understanding their traditions, so that they would know each other better than they did before. He also organized numerous events of coexistence, and cultural enrichment for the youth and human genetics program.

The exhibition space of knowledge and exposure on the application of nuclear energy to the welfare of mankind, so that young people knew of the cultures of young people from other parts of the world, and achieved thus better understand each other. He organized the exhibition of popular atesanías, the world festival of folklore, international gathering of poets, meeting the international festival of arts, international meeting of sculptors, and exhibition of masterpieces of world art. It organized a film festival whose theme was the "mission of youth".

In 1968, he chaired in Mexico Pro Defense Committee of the Jewish minority in the Soviet Union. As president of the International Cultural Commission of the International Olympic Committee, he proposed in said organism, the rescue of the Olympic Truce, and proposed to invite Nobel Peace Prize winners to the Olympic Games.

== Urbanism ==
- 1943 Urban Study Ciudad Guzman, Jalisco, Mexico (first thesis on urbanism that was presented at the School of Architecture, and with which he qualified as an architect)
- 1948 master plan study for the Border Tabasco, Mexico
- 1953 regulatory plan Culiacán, Sinaloa, Mexico. It was intended to meet, define and regulate the structure of the city.
- 1958 study coordinator of the Planning Commission of the Council for Economic and Social Planning, discusses the problems of Mexico City and proposed solutions captures part of the studies and the general population. Delivers the document on the organization of the Mexico City proposed a package solution, and complementary solutions (in the campaign of Lic. Adolfo Lopez Mateos). On his appointment as Chief CAPFCE not followed up on the proposal.
- 1960 Remodeling of Dolores Hidalgo, Guanajuato, Mexico, restoration of facades regulates the use of advertisements, and all rehabilitated urban infrastructure: water, sewage, electricity, telephones, floors etc., for the 150th anniversary of the National Independence of Mexico.
- 1968 Along with Mathias Goeritz, brings art to urban scale with the Route of Friendship, or "Ruta de la Amistad", road that connected the Olympic Village with Cuemanco Channel Mexico.
- 1970 Member of International Planning Committee of the City of Jerusalem (A body that determined the urban development of the city).
- 1970 AURIS Coordinator (Institute of Urban Action and Social Integration), creation of the City of Cuautitlan Izcalli, Mexico City.
- 1970 Urban planning and design for the new capital of Tanzania, Dodoma (formerly the capital of Tanzania was Dar es Salaam), providing location applicable to the area of government solutions.
- 1971 Urban art in signaling paths, parks and urban renewal in Mexico State (Paseo Tollocan, Valle Lerma, and several other zones, required urban signs in Mexico State). ("Project sources and sculptures" was planned in order to adorn the industrial zone of Paseo Tollocan. In the "Paseo Tollocan" Ángela Gurria sculptures were placed, with topics related to Mexico State)´s typical handicrafts.
- 1976 Faced with the problem of concentration and dispersion of the population and urban growth in the country, he was appointed head of the SAHOP, (Ministry of Human Settlements and Public Works), for plans that will guide a balanced urban development, directing work and public services to encourage decentralization of public agencies, especially the Mexico City
- 1978 February 4, PRV presents the "National Urban Development Plan" to the President of the Republic, and the governors, who express their willingness to fulfill the plan, and are committed to expanding, or updating urban development laws in a period not exceed one year.
- 1979 Second Session of the Republic, Acapulco, Guerrero, Mexico, governors report that they have fulfilled their commitment to expand or add your state laws for urban development. Promise to present its state urban development plan at the next meeting.
- 1980 On February, in the port of Veracruz, Mexico, the third meeting of the republic is carried out. The Governors report that they have formulated 31 state urban development plans. Representatives of the country's authorities are committed to make all municipal plans.
- 1981 On February, at the fourth meeting of the republic, in Hermosillo, Sonora, Mexico, the municipal authorities of the country realize the termination of 2,377 municipal urban development plans, elaborated with the auto planning. They agree to formulate plans for 462 major population centers of Mexico.
- 1982 During the fifth meeting of the republic is reported to have completed the urban development plans of population centers, Guadalajara, Mexico. Plans of urban zones, located in two or more entities Mexico were also completed.
- 1977-1982 Remodeling of the historic center of the Mexico City blocks comprising 668 buildings of historical interest, as monuments, streets, squares etc. Buildings were acquired entity, the former Convent of Jesus Maria, the former convent of St. Agnes, the headquarters of the Royal and Pontifical University, the House of Ajaracas, several buildings seminar, the House of Tithe, and the hospital is the Holy Trinity.

Restoration work on the Cathedral and Sacred Metropolitano. The urban landscape project included works to restore the integrity of the facades, and construction levels. Another issue that was addressed was the valuable monuments of the Historical Center, who saw their integrity affected by differential subsidence of soil, for example, the Temple of the Most Holy, the Loreto, the La Soledad, the church of Santa Teresa Antigua, and the group of the temples of San Juan de Dios, and the Plaza de la Santa Veracruz.

- 2000 Urban Development Program of Greater Saltillo, Coahuila, Mexico.

== Some of his projects ==
Some relevant projects include:

=== In the world ===
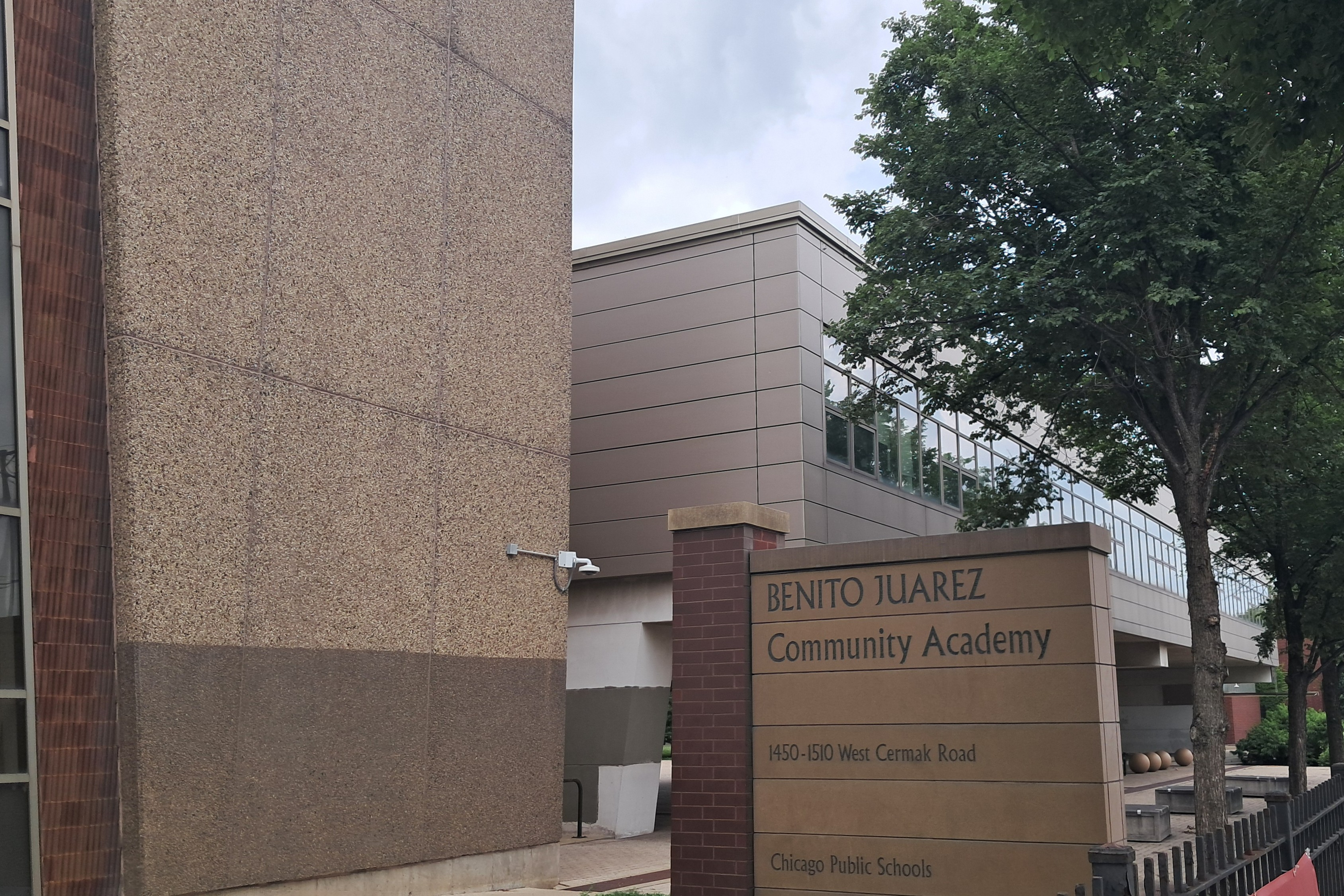
Benito Juarez Community Academy

- 1958 Mexico Pavilion at the World Expo 58 in Brussels.
- 1958 Hall Bed and prefabricated schools in India, Indonesia, Philippines, Tanzania, Yugoslavia and Italy.
- 1962 Mexico Pavilion at the Century 21 Exposition in Seattle.
- 1964 Mexico Pavilion at the World Exposition New York City.
- 1965 Seminar Leopards town Rocklands project with Arch. Jorge Basurto and Jesus Aguiga, Dublin, Ireland.
- 1971 The Museum of Black Cultures in Dakar, Senegal.
- 1975 Government Buildings for the new capital of Tanzania to Dodoma.
- 1976 Casa Presidencial in Costa Rica.
- 1977 Benito Juarez Community Academy in Chicago, Illinois, United States
- 1982 Monument to Fray Anton de Montesinos, Dominican Republic.
- 1984 Museum Nubia, Egypt.
- 1986 Headquarters Building International Olympic Committee to Lausanne Switzerland.
- 1988 Museum International Olympic Committee to Lausanne, Switzerland.
- 1989 The shrine of the Virgin of Guadalupe in the St. Peter and Vatican City.
- 1992 Pavilion International Olympic Committee at the Universal Exhibition of Seville, Spain
- 1992 Mexico Pavilion at Seville Expo '92 in Spain.
- 1994 Latin American and the Caribbean to the "University of the West Indies", with Arqs. Giovanini Andrew G, and Javier Ramirez Campuzano. Kingston, Jamaica.

=== In Mexico ===
- Elementary School 1943, Banda Sea No. 18, Tabasco.
- 1943 Elementary School, Baffin Sea No. 3, Tabasco.
- 1943 Baffin Sea Primary School No. 4, Tabasco.
- Elementary School 1943 Gulf of California, Tabasco.
- Schools in 1944 in the towns of Tabasco and Tamulté Atasta Villahermosa, Tabasco.
- 1950 Elementary School, Colonia Morelos Mexico City.
- 1951 Elementary School El Pipila, with Arq. Horacio Boy, Mexico City.
- 1952 National School of Medicine, with Arqs. Roberto Alvarez Espinosa, Ramon Torres Martinez and Hector Velazquez, Mexico City.
- 1952 The National School of Medicine Ciudad Universitaria, UNAM (now Faculty of Medicine) Mexico City.
- 1954 The building of the Ministry of Labour and Social Welfare (Mexico) | Secretariat of Labor, Mexico City.
- 1955 - 1957 Markets La Lagunilla, Tepito, Coyoacan, Azcapotzalco, San Pedro de los Pinos and another 10 more.
- 1957 Northeastern University City (Master Plan) with Arch. Rafael Mijares, Tampico, Tamaulipas.
- 1958 Hall Bed and prefabricated schools in Mexico, and 17 countries in Latin America (more than 150, 000 units in Mexico in 1958-1976).
- 1959 System Construction of the rural school. They have built thousands of schools with this system in Mexico and abroad. The UNICEF adopted this construction system.
- 1959 Elementary School S.T.P.S (Attached to the Ministry of Labour and Social Welfare), with Arch. Rafael Mijares, Mexico City.
- 1959 College of Physical Education, with Arch. Rafael Mijares, Mexico City.
- 1959 Rural Schools in Zapotzingo and Nacajuca, Tabasco.
- 1960 National School Kindergarten Educating City, Mexico City.
- 1960 Juárez Institute of Durango with Arch. Rafael Mijares.
- 1960 Gallery of History, Museo del Caracol, Mexico City.
- 1963 Elementary and Secondary School "Central Pedagogical Child" (INPI).
- 1963 Heroes Elementary School and Kindergarten Freedom, Mexico City.
- 1964 Elementary School Earth and Freedom, Toluca, Mexico State.
- 1964 Anne Frank School, San Angel, Mexico City.
- 1964 High School No. 2, Street Sor Juana Ines de la Cruz.
- 1964 National Museum of Anthropology, Mexico City.
- 1964 Museum of Art and History of Ciudad Juarez, Chihuahua.
- 1964 Museum of Modern Art in Mexico | Museum of Modern Art, Mexico City.
- 1964 Elementary School, Col. July 7.
- 1964 Elementary School, Col. Lomas de Sotelo.
- 1964 Elementary School No. 273, Col. Ex checkpoint Vallejo.
- 1964 Elementary School, Col. Valentin Gomez.
- 1964 School, Col. Aviacion.
- 1964 Elementary School, Col. Jose Maria Pino Suarez.
- 1964 School in the center, Tacubaya
- 1964 Elementary School in Observatory, Mexico City
- 1964 School Uxmal, Mexico City
- 1965 Tower of Tlatelolco, building of the Centro Cultural Universitario Tlatelolco and its surroundings in the Place of the Three Cultures (Before building of the Ministry of Foreign Affairs) Mexico City.
- 1965 Centro Escolar Revolution project with Arch. I. Ordorica.
- 1966 Azteca Stadium, Mexico City.
- 1967 Cuauhtémoc Stadium, Puebla.
- 1969 Irish College, with Arch. Rafael Mijares, and Ing. Guillermo Ballesteros, Mexico City
- 1972 Housing Unit El Rosario (in collaboration with the architects Teodoro Gonzalez de Leon and Ricardo Legorreta) Mexico City.
- 1973 Municipal Palace Cuautitlan Izcalli, his explanda and several projects that were unpublished as the Building Tree and monumental statues and out of the municipality, with the letters CI embracing all lanes of Highway Mexico Querétaro.
- 1974 The Master Program Units Azcapotzalco, Iztapalapa and Xochimilco of Autonomous Metropolitan University.
- 1974 Irish College, San Pedro Garza Garcia, Monterrey.
- 1974 Autonomous Metropolitan University, Founder, President, and Architectural Design, with Arch. David Muñoz, (Unit Xochimilco and Azcapotzalco) Mexico City.
- 1975 Embassy Japan in Mexico, Mexico City.
- 1976 Liceo Mexicano Japonés
- 1976 The New Basilica of Our Lady of Guadalupe (in collaboration with Arqs. Gabriel Chavez de la Mora and José Luis Benllioure.) City from Mexico.
- 1980 Legislative Palace of San Lazaro (official site of the Chamber of Deputies of Mexico) Mexico City.
- 1980 - 1981 Institute for Historical Research and Documentation (Annex to the Cloister of Sor Juana) with Arqs. Rafael Mijares, and Andrew G. Giovanini
- 1982 Centro Cultural Tijuana, Tijuana.
- 1984 The Torre Axa (formerly Torre Mexicana), Mexico City.
- 1984 Project Iberoamericana University, in collaboration with the architects Rafael Mijares, Andres Serrano and Francisco G. Giovanini
- 1984 Building Omega, Mexico City.
- 1986 Church of the Sacred Heart of Jesus in Tocumbo, Michoacán.
- 1987 Templo Mayor Museum, Mexico City.
- 1987 Amparo Museum, Puebla.
- 1993 Industrial Technical School UANL Alvaro Obregon, with Arqs. Giovanini Andrew G, and Javier Ramirez Campuzano. Monterrey, Nuevo Leon.
- 1994 Marist University (Master Plan) "Y" in the Ajusco, with Arqs. Giovanini Andrew G, and Javier Ramirez Campuzano, Mexico City.
- 1994 Marist University (Master Plan) in the Ajusco Tulips, with Arqs. Giovanini Andrew G, and Javier Ramirez Campuzano, Mexico City.
- 1995 Marist University (Master Plan) National Canal, Tláhuac, Mexico City, with Arqs. Giovanini Andrew G, and Javier Ramirez Campuzano.
- 1995 Marist University (Master Plan) Eje 10 Sur, Tláhuac, Mexico City, with Arqs. Giovanini Andrew G, and Javier Ramirez Campuzano.
- 1996 - 2000 Infotecas of the Autonomous University of Coahuila on their campuses: Saltillo, Monclova and Tower, with Arqs. Giovanini Andrew G, and Javier Ramirez Campuzano.
- 1997 Convention and Exhibition Centre, Merida.
- 1999 Info Center of the University of Monterrey, Andrés Giovanini G Santa Lucia River project, Monterrey, with Arch., And Javier Ramirez Campuzano.
- 1999 Autonomous University of Coahuila "Seminars Unit" with the Arch. Andrés Giovanini g, and Javier Ramirez Campuzano. Monclova, Coahuila.
- 2004 Auditorio Siglo XXI Puebla.
- 2008 Autonomous Metropolitan University (Tower I Project), with Arqs. Giovanini Andrew G, and Javier Ramirez Campuzano.
- 2008 International Convention Center Chetumal, Quintana Roo.
- 2008 Metropolitan Autonomous University, Campus Master Plan Cuajimalpa, with the Arch. Andrés Giovanini G, and Javier Ramirez Campuzano.
- 2010 Presidents Museum Coahuila, Saltillo.
- 2009 Metropolitan Autonomous University, Campus Master Plan Lerma, with Arqs. Giovanini Andrew G, and Javier Ramirez Campuzano.
- 2011 City Theatre in Piedras Negras, Coahuila (2011).

=== Representative Unrealized projects ===
- 1961 Headquarters Building Institutional Revolutionary Party (PRI).
- 1962 Border Museum of Matamoros, Tamaulipas, Mexico.
- 1969 Source of Olympism Chicago, Illinois.
- 1971 Symbol Tower office, Cuautitlan Izcalli, Mexico State.
- 1972 Building International Trade Center, and Public Square in Marseille, France.
- 1973 Museum of Anthropology, Tegucigalpa, Honduras.
- 1975 National Museum of Iran. Tehran, Iran.
- 1975 Ecumenical Church in Cancun, Quintana Roo, Mexico.
- 1979 Museum Avery Brundage, Olympia, Greece.
- 1979 Square Urban Rescue Isabel the Catholic, Mexico.
- 1981 Mexican Cultural Center, Managua, Nicaragua.
- 1982 Project Arche de la Defense, Paris, France.
- 1982 Project to the Parc De La Villette, Paris, France.
- 1985 Expansion Project Louvre, Paris, France.
- 1989 Project Museum Acropolis, Athens, Greece.
- 1989 Monumental Cruz de Manzanillo, Colima, Mexico.
- 1993 Eagle Tower, Paseo de la Reforma, Mexico.
- 1995 National Museum of Korea, Seoul.
- 1997 cultural and multipurpose center, Monte Carlo, Monaco.
- 1997 Expansion Project Sanctuary of Our Lady of Fatima, Fatima, Portugal.
- 1999 Zoo Jalapa, Veracruz, Mexico.
- 1999 Cathedral of Christ the King, Acapulco, Guerrero, Mexico.
- 2000 Square Mariana, Mexico City.
- 2004 Project to the Olympic Stadium Beijing, China.
- 2008 Project Bicentennial Monumental Arch, Mexico City.

== Main achievements in design ==
- 1952 Club America logo FC (being Miguel Ramírez Vázquez President of the Club). Cartel oficial Juegos Olímpicos México 1968, con sello y firma de registro de derecho de author
- 1952 Design Exhibition for the Pan American Congress of Architects.
- 1957 Corporate image of the Office of Architects Ramírez Vázquez and Mijares.
- 1958 Design museology Mexico Pavilion at the Universal Exhibition in Brussels, Belgium (won the gold star of the show).
- 1960 With Julio Prieto and Carmen Antunes, design Museology at the National Gallery of History (Museo del Caracol).
- 1962 Design museology Mexico Pavilion at the Universal Exhibition in Seattle, Washington, United States.
- 1964 With Mario Vazquez and Alfonso Soto Soria, museum planning and design of the National Museum of Anthropology and History.
- 1964 With Ruth Rivera, planning and design museum Musée National d'Art Moderne.
- 1967 Corporate identity of the Third International Sports Week.
- 1968 Creator of Mexico 68 identity program and famous logo and strategic planning for the Olympic Games in Mexico, covering graphic design, furniture design and urban signage, exhibition design, film section, mass media advertising campaign, design of ceremonies, design Publishing, PR campaign, planning the route of the Olympic torch, etc.
- 1970 Corporate image of the Mexican Institute of Child Welfare.
- 1970 Commissioned by Guillermo Canedo, realization of typography for the logo Mexico 70.
- 1970 Different designs of silverware for TANE, Mexico.
- 1971 Signalling Design and Urban Furniture for Toluca Tollocan ride, and various municipalities of the State of Mexico.
- 1972 Furniture Design for Lopez-Morton SA.
- 1972 Grupo Televisa Corporate image.
- 1972 Corporate image of the College of Civil Engineers of Mexico.
- 1973 Corporate image of the Autonomous Metropolitan University.
- 1974 Corporate Image Bank Atlantic.
- 1974 Corporate image of Hellenic Cultural Institute.
- 1974 Corporate image for Fertilizers of Central America SA.
- 1975 Corporate image La Salle University.
- 1975 Corporate image design, advertising and strategic communications for the presidential campaign of Lic. José López Portillo.
- 1975 Corporate image of Cementos APASCO.
- 1976 Corporate image DYNAMICS (Alpha Group).
- 1976 Corporate image BANCAM SA (Monterrey).
- 1976 Corporate image SICARTSA.
- 1977 Corporate image Sports Forecast for Public Assistance.
- 1977 NOVA Corporate image (Alpha Group).
- 1977 Corporate Image for the National Sports Institute.
- 1980 Wallpaper Design for Living Council of FAO, Rome, Italy.
- 1985 Logo for the Mexican Health Foundation AC.
- 1985-1988 Designs printed on silk to the International Olympic Committee, Lausanne, Switzerland.
- 1986 Design and development of urban atmospheres for the World Cup, and the Estadio Azteca.
- 1992 design museum Mexico Pavilion of the Universal Exhibition 92 Sevilla, Spain.
- 1997 With Iker Larrauri, planning and design museum Nubia Museum in Aswan Culture, Egypt.
- 2007 Museografía exposure Latin Migration for Universal Forum of Cultures, Monterrey.
- 2010 logo Coahuilenses Presidents Museum, Saltillo, Coahuila.
- Until 2012, since 1956, different works in editorial design.
- Up to 2013 from 1969, designed glassware for Cristaluxus Monterrey, Mexico, DAUM (France) and own. There are parts of his own in the Museums of DAUM, (Nancy, France), Museum of Glass Monterrey, Mexico Museum of Death (Aguascalientes), Mexico, Museo Amparo (Puebla), Mexico Olympic Museum (Lausanne, Switzerland), Ski Museum Hollmenkollen, (Oslo, Norway), STAUBO Museum Collection (Hamar, Norway)

== Furniture design ==
The creative spirit of Pedro Ramírez Vázquez was not limited to architecture, because it also included furniture design, both indoors as urban furniture. This activity began in the 1950s, with the design of a wooden chair with leather. In the early 1970s, he developed a line of furniture in steel plate with different finishes, covering indoor and outdoor chairs, coffee tables and dining room tables. All in different designs, shapes and sizes, and some wooden furniture. With the same concept in steel plate designed benches for urban accessories, among them several models "you and me", or love seat characteristic can be found in the City of Yucatán, in Mexico. These designs also include street signs in large format, designs that were applied in the State of Mexico, during the government of Professor Carlos Hank Gonzalez.

It was at this time when equipal contemporary designs inspired by traditional Mexican equipal, showing its principle expressed in current form, the cultural constants regarding typical furniture.

These designs are still valid, now the Civic Plaza of the Chamber of Deputies in Mexico, is equipped with this type of seats. In turn, the furniture Ramirez Vazquez is now known in the design world of interior design, as it has been released by the magazine Wallpaper, New York Post, Metropolis Magazine, Architectural Digest, Paris Match, The Editor at Large, and the Wall Street Journal. Its main selling points are found in the United States.

== Art Object in glassware ==
In 1965, when Ramírez Vázquez designed the headquarters of the Ministry of Foreign Affairs of Mexico, then Secretary Don. Antonio Carrillo Flores commissioned to design glassware for such dependence. Inspired by the "Glass pulquero of Tlatelolco" PRV designed crystal glasses with a similar shape, making a cut that similar to the shape of a maguey. From this design, he defined that working with glass was just as "making sculpture with light", as it is a material in which transparency all sides are visual at the same time, and depending on the cuts, reflexes are variable by the appearance of a piece of Glass, according to the view as it looks and the lighting it receives.

He had a shop called "Cristal-Art" and installed a cutting workshop in his office, which still remains operating, and continues to produce Ramírez Vázquez´s designs, given that he left many of them in sketch.

His pieces of art object in crystal, have been requested as awards from various institutions, such as Nadro, ANTAD, The International Olympic Committee, the WBC, the Mexican Foundation Health, etc. For its quality, there have been exhibitions in the Merk Up gallery, the Misratchi gallery, the Glass Museum in Monterrey, Mexico, the Museum of Modern Art in Mexico, the Museum of Anthropology Mexico City, and the Cabañas Cultural Institute, Guadalajara, Mexico.

He performed with Salvador Dalí, and many other important artists, designs in glass paste (pâte du verre) for DAUM glassware. Other important personalities such as, Juan Antonio Samaranch, Manuel Espinosa Yglesias, Jose Lopez Portillo, (President of Mexico from 1976-1982), among others, had collection of pieces of Pedro Ramírez Vazquez.

He designed glassware for Cristaluxus Monterrey, Mexico different pieces for DAUM line (France), and lines for the same firm, Articles of crystal Macrisa, Nouvel Studio and own. There are pieces designed by himself in the Museums of DAUM, (Nancy, France), Museum of Glass Monterrey, Mexico, Museum of Death (Aguascalientes), Mexico, Amparo Museum (Puebla) Mexico, Olympic Museum (Lausanne, Switzerland), Museum of Coahuila Presidents Saltillo, Coahuila, Mexico, Hollmenkollen Ski Museum (Oslo, Norway), Staubø Museum collection (Hamar, Norway).

== Articles in magazines ==
- "10 logros en la 'monumental' carrera de Ramírez Vázquez - arquitectura - obrasweb.com". Obrasweb.mx. 16 April 2013.
- "Pedro Ramirez Vazquez Mexican Architect Dies At 94". The New York Times.>
- por Ana Asensio (29 May 2013). "Pedro Ramírez Vázquez / Vida y Obra". aaaa magazine.>
- "Twentieth Culture - Pedro Ramirez Vasquez". Twentieth.net. Archived from the original on 3 July 2015.
- Ignacio Villarreal. "Pedro Ramírez Vazquez awarded Fine Arts Medal by the National Institute of Fine Arts". Artdaily.com.
- "Church Designer Magazine - Championing Design: The Olympic Museum". Designerpub.com. 27 August 2014. Archived from the original on 4 March 2016.
- "Mexican Architect Pedro Ramírez Vázquez Dies at 94". ArchDaily. 19 April 2013.
- "Pedro Ramírez Vázquez (1919-2013)". Arquine. 17 April 2013.
- "Architecture Classics: Torre SRE Tlatelolco / Pedro Ramírez Vázquez". ArchDaily. 21 April 2013.<

Sporting positions
| Preceded by (Japan) Daigoro Yasukawa | President of Organizing Committee for Summer Olympic Games; 1968 | Succeeded by (West Germany) Hans-Jochen Vogel |
