= Teresa Fraga =

Mexican-American teacher and community organizer

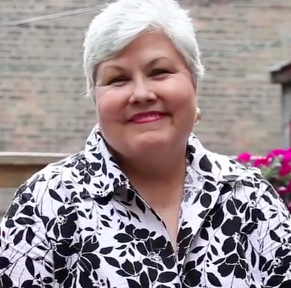
- Born: c. 1943 (age 82–83); Zacatecas, Mexico
- Education: Northeastern Illinois University
- Occupation: Community organizer
- Known for: Benito Juarez High School, Pilsen Neighbors Community Council, Fiesta del Sol

Teresa Fraga is a Mexican-born teacher, community organizer, and activist in Pilsen, Chicago. She is an executive board member and the treasurer of Pilsen Neighbors Community Council (PNCC), and the co-chair of the Pilsen Planning Committee.

== Early life ==
Teresa Fraga was born in a tent near a construction project in Zacatecas, Mexico, around 1943. She moved to the United States with her family when she was seven years old. Fraga worked as a migrant farm worker around the United States, then moved to Chicago with her husband, Refugio, and children in 1966. They settled in the Pilsen neighborhood, and bought a home there in 1981.

== Public life ==
Raising six children, Fraga was concerned with crime, drugs, and inadequate schools in Pilsen. In the 1970s, Fraga got involved with local education and community organizing. She got involved with the construction of Benito Juarez High School, and served as President of the Jungman Local School Council from 1975 to 1977. She ran and was elected president of the Pilsen Neighbors Community Council (PNCC) in 1977, at age 33. She was president of the PNCC for seven years, until she stepped down in May 1982. She was also president of the Cooper Upper Cycle School Council from 1981 to 1983. Next, Fraga was president of the United Neighborhood Organization from 1986 to 1990. During this period of heavy community involvement, Fraga earned her G.E.D. and Bachelor's degree and worked as a teacher at José Clemente Orozco Academy. She was president of the PNCC again in 1989 and 1990. She was appointed to the board of trustees of the City Colleges of Chicago by Mayor Daley in 1990. Fraga ran for Alderman of the 25th Ward in 1995 and 1997.

In addition to contributing to the funding and establishment of Benito Juarez High School, Fraga has had other major impacts in the Pilsen community. She pushed for a $26 million, five-year sidewalk repair program, and worked for newer and better parks in Pilsen. Fraga has worked for the past 20 years on a project to develop a paseo, or multi-purpose path, between Pilsen and Little Village, Chicago. Since the 1990s, Fraga has contended with gentrification in Pilsen, working to keep housing prices, property taxes, and utility costs manageable for lower income residents of Pilsen.

DePaul University Special Collections and Archives holds the Teresa Fraga Papers, a collection of materials documenting Fraga's public life and activities with community organizations.

== Media coverage ==
Fraga and her family have been the subject of two documentaries, each airing on WTTW in Chicago: "Pilsen: Point of Entry" and "The More Things Change," part of the Inside Housing series. Fraga is also featured in a 2002 textbook, Reading Adventures, from Pearson Education, in a section called "Today's Immigrants."
