= Benito Juarez Community Academy =

High school in Chicago, Illinois, US

Benito Juarez Academy High School
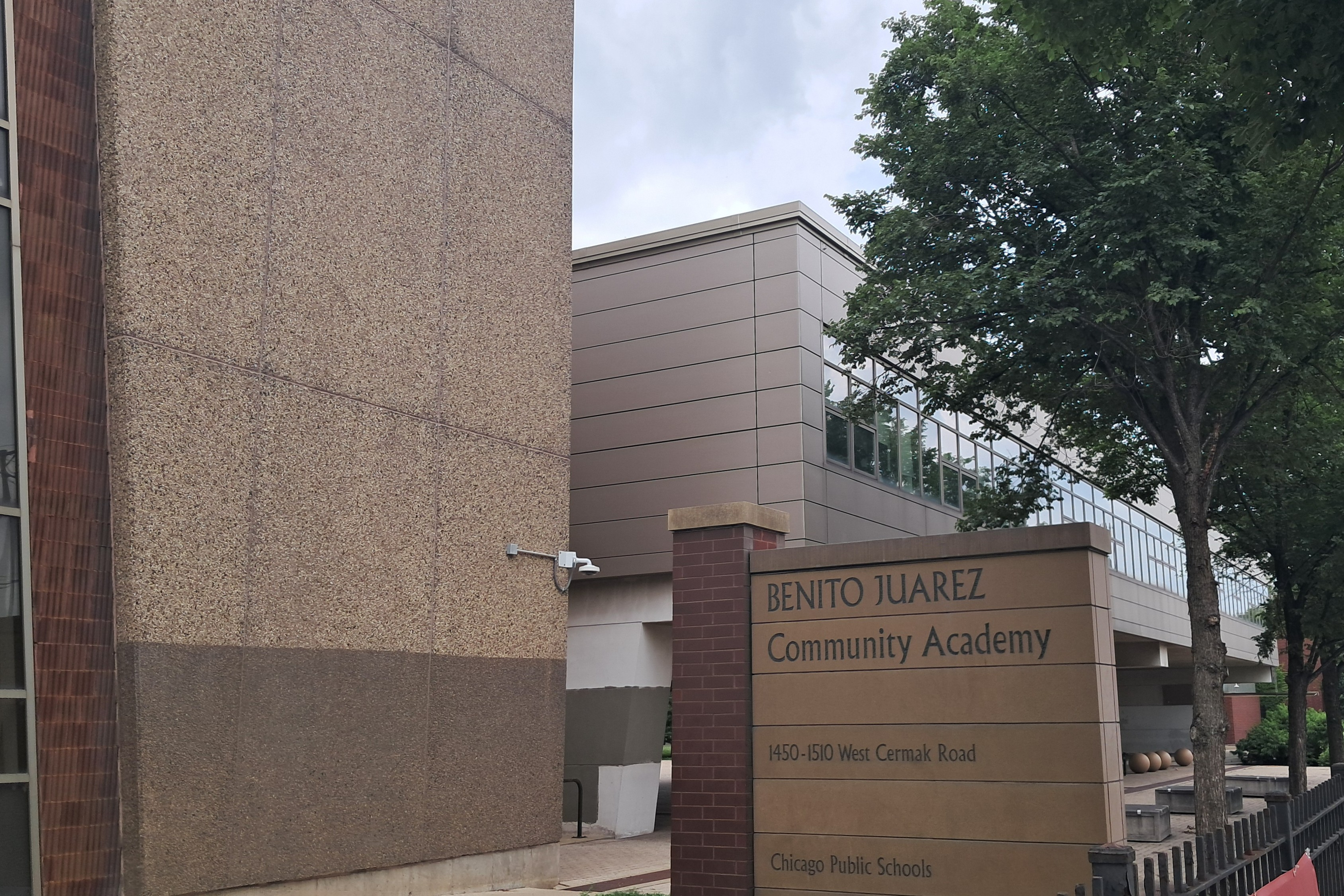

Location
- 1450–1510 W. Cermak Road; Chicago, Illinois 60608; United States; 41.8529°N 87.6645°W

Information
- School type: Public Secondary
- Motto: Soaring to new heights!
- Opened: 1977
- School district: Chicago Public Schools
- Principal: Juan C. Ocon
- Grades: 9–12
- Gender: Coed
- Enrollment: 1,682 (2015–16)
- Campus type: Urban
- Colors: Black; Silver
- Athletics conference: Chicago Public League
- Team name: Eagles
- Accreditation: North Central Association of Colleges and Schools
- Yearbook: Eagle
- Website: benitojuarez.net

Benito Juarez Community Academy, commonly known as Juarez High School and abbreviated as BJCA, is a public four-year high school in the Pilsen neighborhood on the west side of Chicago, Illinois, United States. Juarez is named for Mexican president Benito Pablo Juárez García. The school is a part of the Chicago Public Schools (CPS) district. As of 2014, it has been recognized as the largest high school in Pilsen. The building was designed by architect Pedro Ramírez Vázquez.

The school was proposed to the Chicago Board of Education multiple times but ultimately rejected. This led to protests and boycotts from many Mexican students and families. Finally, in June 1974, the Chicago Board of Education approved $8.9 million in funding to build a high school in Pilsen. Benito Juarez Community Academy opened in 1977 and as of 2017 has a 94 percent Latino student body. The school is decorated with murals and statues that portray Mexican culture and famous leaders.

== History ==
Prior to the opening of Juarez, Pilsen area students attended Carter Harrison Technical High School. The Pilsen community asked for a senior high school of their own since the students had to cross gang territory to get to Harrison. Other factors included racial tensions at Harrison itself and Pilsen parents worrying about their children getting into trouble away from their watch. A March 1972 boycott of two area schools, the Froebel branch of Harrison and Jirka School, from Mexican origin people gave impetus to have Juarez built.

Teresa Fraga, Mary Gonzales and Raquel Guerrero are the three founding mothers of Benito Juarez Community High School. Gonzales was the head of the Pilsen Neighbors group. In the late 1960s, the three mothers shared concerns for their own children when the only public high school available was Harrison High school. Harrison high school was located in a neighborhood plagued with gang territory and racial tension between African Americans and Mexican Americans. The mothers wanted a safe and conducive school for Spanish speaking students.

In June 1973 the Chicago Board of Education approved the construction of Juarez, and the board selected the location in September of that year. In June 1974, Chicago's Board of Education approved $8.9 million in funding to build a high school in Pilsen. By September 1974, due to business owners wanting to increase the final payments made out to them from the loss of their businesses and factory workers who themselves were parents not wishing to lose their jobs, CPS had not yet begun construction of Juarez; this prompted area parents and students to protest and ask the workers and business owners to reconsider their stances. Additional boycotts and use of "freedom schools" instead of the regular public schools occurred. In 1975 CPS acquired the land and in 1976 it selected the architect.

The city closed Blue Island to prepare for the construction of the school. The contractors who had the school built were Mexican-American. Some University of Illinois Chicago students suggested naming the school after Emiliano Zapata, Che Guevara, or another revolutionary of Latin American origin, but the parents were opposed to that idea.

When the school opened, the faculty had originated from other Chicago schools. The formal dedication occurred on September 16, 1977. The CPS superintendent, Joseph Hannon, attended and stated that the Juarez school represented "a community that would not take 'no' for an answer." René Luis Alvarez, a professor at Northeastern Illinois University, stated that the school's establishment, "[i]n many ways", originated from the Chicano movement and its desire for greater recognition of Mexican-American history and identity.

The school was established in 1977. During the opening ceremony, a bust sculpture of Juárez and the flag of Mexico were presented, and the anthems of the United States and of Mexico were both played. The choice of the day of the ceremony was influenced by the fact that September 16 is the anniversary of the Cry of Dolores, the Mexican independence day, as well as near the beginning of the school year in Chicago. In its first year the school had grades 9–11, with 12th grade coming later.

By 1997 CPS officials were considering expanding Juarez since it became one of the most crowded community high schools in Chicago.

== Notable events ==
=== 2016 scholarship accomplishment ===
In 2016, Benito Juarez Community Academy in Pilsen celebrated a significant milestone as its graduates earned $26 million in college scholarships. Notable among these were scholarships from organizations such as the Bill & Melinda Gates Foundation, the Posse Foundation, and the Golden Apple Scholars of Illinois. These scholarships provided full tuition coverage for undergraduate and graduate degrees. 97 percent of the students were low income and 95 percent were Hispanic.

=== 2022 Hope Chicago partnership ===
In February 2022, Juarez became the first of five schools to partner with Hope Chicago. All students who were enrolled at the time of the announcement received fully-funded scholarships for Hope Chicago's 20 partner colleges, universities and other education programs across the state of Illinois. Governor JB Pritzker was present in the school building during the surprise announcement. By the end of the week, an estimated total of 4,000 students received debt-free scholarships across five different high schools also partnered with Hope Chicago.

=== 2022 shooting ===
On December 16, 2022, Brandon Perez, aged 15, and Nathan Billegas, aged 14, were killed by gunfire on school grounds following a dispute about their gang affiliation. A total of 8 bullets were discharged. Two other students were wounded by gunfire. The shooting took place shortly after the end of the school day, as students were walking out of school. It occurred outside the school's buildings, at a pathway. On June 17, 2024, Christian Acevedo, a former student, was charged with multiple offenses, being the shooter. He faced charges including two counts of first-degree murder, two counts of attempted murder, aggravated discharge of a weapon on school grounds, aggravated unlawful use of a weapon, and multiple counts of unlawful weapon use. He was tried as an adult and sentenced to 20 years for each murder charge, with a requirement to serve at least 85% of the sentence for attempted murder. Additionally, he received a consecutive 46-year sentence.

=== Eslabon Armado appearance ===
On May 9, 2024, the popular Mexican band Eslabon Armado made a surprise appearance at Juarez, distributing free tickets to students for an upcoming concert at Allstate Arena. The band, known for record-breaking releases such as “Ella Baila Sola” and collaborations with artists like Peso Pluma and Junior H, appeared in the school's cafeteria during 4th period, where they were met with a large incoming crowd of students from all parts of the school. The band also visited Curie High School on this day. Tickets and posters for the event were being distributed, and the band was also seen signing a guitar for a student.

== Campus ==
The school is located at Blue Island and Cermak avenues. The campus was designed by Mexican architect Pedro Ramírez Vázquez; it is centered around a three-story patio intended as a point of assembly for students and a community center, and the design features similar to Aztec pyramids were intended as a homage to Mexican culture.

The school includes "La Esperanza," a 1979 mural depicting the struggle for Mexican-American young people. It was professionally commissioned by mothers who had advocated for the construction of the school. The artists were Malú Ortega y Alberro, Jimmy Longoria, Oscar Moya, Marcos Raya, Robert Valadez, and Salvador Vega. Various other murals with Mexican nationalist and pre-Columbian motifs were painted by Mexican-American artists.

In 1981, students at Latino Youth High School working through the Community TV Network helped produce La Esperanza, a documentary about the creation of the A La Esperanza mural at Benito Juarez High School. The film later became part of exhibitions examining the history of community arts and education in Pilsen, including the National Museum of Mexican Art's 2019 exhibition 40 años a la esperanza and programming at the University of Illinois Chicago's Gallery 400.

Juarez was expanded in 2010 to include a larger campus, an auditorium, and a soccer field. Technology is integrated, and there are ten modern computer labs.

== Academics ==
Juarez is one of many schools to offer the International Baccalaureate (IB) program to incoming students. 11th and 12th graders (Juniors, Seniors) can be enrolled into IB's Diploma Programme (DP), a two-year educational programme intended to better prepare students for college.

Additional programs offered by the school include Advanced Placement (AP) courses in Biology, Calculus, Chemistry, Chinese Language and Culture, Computer Science, English Language and Composition, English Literature, European History, Physics, Psychology, Spanish Language, Spanish Literature, Statistics, Studio Art–Drawing, Studio Art 2–D Design, U.S. Government/Politics and United States History.

== Extracurriculars ==
The school provides a diverse range of extracurricular activities that students can participate in after school on specific days. Information on schedules are available on the school's website.

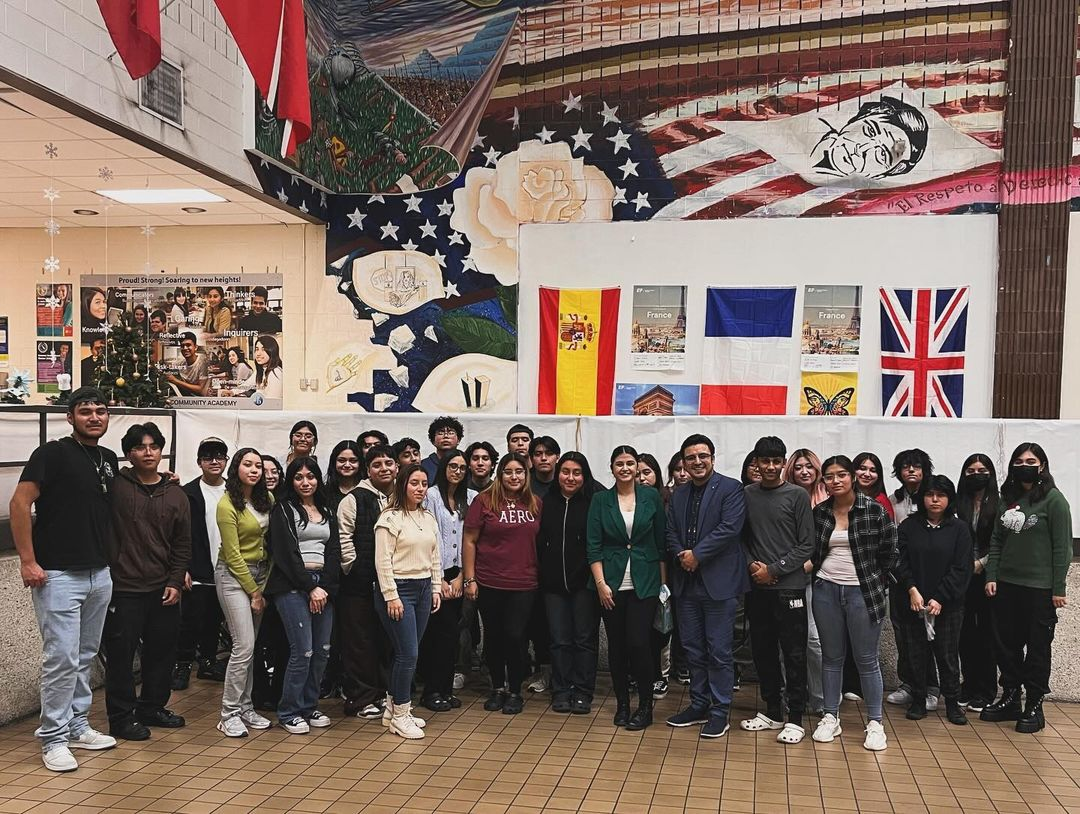
Students from The Spanish Club volunteering for the school's 'Posada' event in 2023, Led by teacher Ana Patiño and student Kamran Shafi.

Below is a list of extracurricular activities that have been available to students over time. (For an up-to-date list, refer to the school's website):

- After School Matters - Mariachi Ensemble
- Art Club
- Bilingual Tutoring Club
- BJABU (Benito Juarez Association for Black Unity)
- buildOn
- Culinary Club
- Dance Team
- Drum Line
- Elite Gamers (Yu-Gi-Oh! Club)
- Esports
- ETA (Eagles Traveling Abroad)
- Folkloric Dance
- French Club
- Gender and Sexuality Alliance (GSA)
- Girls Who Code
- Guitar Club / Vocal Club
- HOSA Chapter/Club
- Juarez Drama Club/Ensemble
- Monarcas
- Moot Court
- National Honor Society (NHS)
- Peer Mentoring
- Robotics Club
- Senior Council
- Spanish Club
- Student Voice Committee (SVC)
- Trash Talkers / Navigators
- We Gon’ Be All Write
- Yearbook Club

== Athletics ==
Juarez competes in the Chicago Public League (CPL) and is a member of the Illinois High School Association (IHSA). The school's sport teams are nicknamed Eagles. Juarez boys' cross country were Class AA in 1995–96. The boys' soccer team were Public league champions in 1995–96, Class AA in 2007–08 and Class 2A in 2010–11, while the girls' team was the inaugural Public League Champion in 1994.

== See also ==
- Mexicans in Chicago
- Liceo Mexicano Japonés - A private school in Mexico City designed by Pedro Ramírez Vázquez
