= Marcos Raya =

Mexican artist (born 1948)

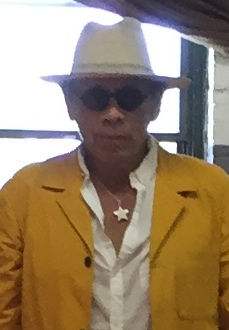
Raya at his studio in New City, Chicago, August 2018

Marcos Raya (born 1948 in Irapuato in the state of Guanajuato, Mexico) is a Mexican American/Chicano artist based in Chicago, Illinois, United States. He became known in the Mexican American neighborhood of Pilsen for his street murals. His studio is in the New City neighborhood.

== Early life ==
Raya spent the first 16 years of his life in Irapuato before moving to the United States with his mother and siblings. He enjoyed the year-round religious celebrations, which he described as "collective fiestas filled with music, alcohol, masks, and the Catholic church." Raya describes them as "not Catholic in the full sense of the term, but pagan." They were occasions for heavy drinking. On Sundays, he'd attend church: "I would go and make faces at saints. I thought they were ugly, barbarous, long-haired, just plain out of this world." From his window at home, he could "see prostitutes, boxers, singers, proletariats, just like here" [in Pilsen].

Raya moved to Chicago in 1964, when it was "one of the most industrialized cities in the world," one that had many ethnic groups. The mid-1960s coincided with height of the Civil rights movement. The conditions created by the movement allowed for him to express his political sentiment through his artwork.

== Career ==
By the age of 18 Raya knew he would become an artist.

Raya paints street murals and also creates paintings and self-portraits, as well as multi-media projects. Well known in Pilsen for his street murals and involvement in the art community, Raya has also had his artwork exhibited nationally and internationally. He and Carlos Cortez were the only Chicago artists included in the exhibition "Chicano Art: Resistance and Affirmation 1965-1985," which toured from 1990-1993.

As noted in 1996: "Within the last three years Raya's paintings, installations, assemblages, photographs, and painted furniture have been featured in four Latino art exhibitions that have traveled Mexico, Japan, and the U.S." Raya's work has been shown in Riverside CA's The Cheech Marin Center for Chicano Art & Culture (2023). It is currently in the Museum of Fine Arts, Houston's Frida: The Making of an Icon exhibition, which will travel to London.

His work is included in the permanent collections of Chicago's National Museum of Mexican Art, the Museum of Contemporary Art in Chicago, the Alfred Smart Museum at the University of Chicago, the Menil Collection in Houston, the Museum of Fine Arts in Houston, and the Museum of Notre Dame in Indiana.

Much of Raya's artwork is influenced by his Mexican roots. When Raya was a child, he met Mexican street artist José Chávez Morado. Raya believes that his encounter with Chávez Morado, known for creating street murals with strong political meaning, helped him better understand his goals through painting. Raya recalls this experience "I talked to him about how he mixed his paint and his beautiful images. Muralists were men you could talk to and relate to. They painted history and denounced war, political corruption, you name it. And they were also active politically." Influenced by his encounter with Chávez Morado, Raya moved to Chicago and enrolled at Crane High School, where art teacher Jeff Gottlieb took Raya on a field trip to the Art Institute of Chicago, where his interest in art was further piqued. Being an immigrant from Mexico, Raya had a mixed sense of nationality: he was old enough to remember what Mexico was like, but was simultaneously molded by American values.

His Chicano identity is important to Raya, one that acknowledges his Mexican heritage as well as his American upbringing. Mexican Americans initially adopted the term "Chicano" after it was used against them derogatorily, but they transformed it into a prideful term. The term Chicano, formed in ahistorical context of oppression, has come to be associated with rebelliousness against racial oppression and the pressure of forced assimilation.

In Mexico, according to Raya, art has a "social-political dimension" a "beautiful tradition." He adds: "You become a public figure. You are the spokesman of the proletariat, of the oppressed." In this way, says Raya, "you speak for the people through the walls you paint."

Pilsen became an active center for the community mural movement in the United States, thanks in part to the Casa Atzlan community center, where Raya was mentored in 1972 by muralist Ray Patlan, who was one of its organizers.

Much of Raya's artwork contains Chicano themes, and many times he incorporates political messages in his work as well. In “Our Lady of the New Millennium,” Raya utilizes the format of the famous image of “Virgen de Guadalupe.” But in place of "la virgen" he has placed a scantily clad woman, seemingly constructed of metallic pieces. Raya draws from his Mexican heritage in order to make a political statement about money, sex, and power replacing religion in contemporary society. Drawing on his heritage, he transforms the image of La virgen into a critique of the society in which he is entrenched today.

One of his more recent works "Los hijos de la mala vida" or "The Sons of the Bad Life" depicts his old drinking buddies before they died, and Raya expresses his gratefulness for having left that life behind him. Raya believes, however that his life is on the upswing, and although he is climbing in years, he is confident his art is just beginning, and he wishes to continue bettering his art.

== Personal life ==
In order to evade the U.S. military draft during the Vietnam War, Raya traveled to Mexico City in October 1968. He was at the Universidad Nacional Autónoma de México (UNAM) during the large-scale student protests in that year. Raya returned to Chicago in 1970, after spending time in Santa Fe, New Mexico.

During his time in Pilsen, Raya also struggled with alcoholism. During the "Nixon-to-Reagan years," he drank in 18th Street cantinas and alleys. Friends and artists who ran into him at bars or on the street either took him home, or to the hospital. Raya overcame alcoholism and expressed his feelings towards it through works such as his self-portrait “3 a.m. Sunday Morning”. In this painting, Raya is shown face down on a table, with an empty bottle of booze and a gun resting near his hand. As an example of how his artwork reflects his personal life, Raya depicts himself with his “demons” floating above his unconscious body, showing the viewer exactly what he's struggling with in the rarest form possible.

Raya still lives in the same apartment he settled in 1980 in Pilsen, though his studio is in New City, Chicago. Having overcome his alcoholism, Raya frequently thinks about his friends who he has lost to alcoholism.

== Books and Catalogs ==
Durán, Yolanda, René H. Arceo-Frutos, and Mexican Fine Arts Center--Museum (Chicago, Ill). 1993. Art of the Other México : Sources and Meanings. Chicago, Ill.: Mexican Fine Arts Center Museum.

Griswold del Castillo, Richard, Teresa McKenna, and Yvonne Yarbro-Bejarano, eds. and CARA National Advisory Committee. 1991. Chicano Art : Resistance and Affirmation, 1965-1985. Los Angeles: Wight Art Gallery, University of California, Los Angeles.

Mesa-Bains, Amalia, and Mexican Museum. 1993. Ceremony of Spirit: Nature and Memory in Contemporary Latino Art. San Francisco: Mexican Museum.

Mexican Fine Arts Center--Museum (Chicago, Ill). 1988. Adivina! Latino Chicago Expressions: April 22, 1988-July 10, 1988, the Mexican Fine Arts Center--Museum. [Chicago]: The Museum.

Raya, Marcos, Edward M. Maldonado, and Festival Cultural de Mayo Guadalajara, Mexico) 2010. 2010. El Mundo Imaginario de Marcos Raya = the Imaginary World of Marcos Raya. Guadalajara, Jalisco, México: Gobierno de Jalisco, Secretaría de Cultura.

Raya, Marcos. 1997. Marcos Raya: The Anguish of Being. Chicago, IL, Raya Studio.

Raya, Marcos. 2004. Raya: Fetishizing the Imaginary. Chicago, Ill., Marcos Raya Book Project.

Tinterow, Gary, Gannit Ankori, Angélica Becerra, Arden Decker, Cecilia Fajardo-Hill, Circe Henestrosa, Magali Lara, et al. 2026. Frida: The Making of an Icon. Edited by Mari Carmen Ramírez. Houston, Texas, New Haven, Connecticut: The Museum of Fine Arts; Yale University Press.

Warren, Lynne, Francisco Piña, and Marcos Raya. 2017. Raya: The Fetish of Pain. Chicago, Illinois: El Beisman Press / Pilsen Fest.
