= 2024 Chicago Board of Education election =

- November 5, 2024

The Chicago Board of Education election took place on November 5, 2024, alongside the statewide general elections. This was the first ever election to the Board, which has been an appointed body since its formation in 1837.

The election was planned after the state passed a law in 2021 that would create an elected school board. The new Board will eventually have 21 members, consisting of members from 20 districts and one at-large Board President. The 2024 election elected 10 members from newly created districts; the other 10 members and the board president will be appointed by the mayor of Chicago. In the 2026 election, the number of districts will increase to 20, and all members and the President will be elected.

== District 1 ==
=== Candidates ===
Candidates
Candidate	Experience	Campaign	Ref
Jennifer Custer	Chicago Public Schools parent Former teacher, union leader, and administrator in Itasca		
Michelle N. Pierre	Non-profit director Former charter school leader and district administrator in Cleveland		

The following candidate withdrew before ballot certification:

- Charles (Chuck) Hernandez

=== Endorsements ===
Jennifer Custer

State elected officials

- Robert Martwick

Labor unions

- Chicago Teachers Union
Michelle Pierre

Organizations

- Illinois Network of Charter Schools

=== Results ===
2024 Chicago Board of Education District 1 election
Party	Candidate	Votes	%
Nonpartisan	Jennifer Custer	47,661	51.88
Nonpartisan	Michelle N. Pierre	44,203	48.12
Total votes		91,864	100.0

== District 2 ==
=== Candidates ===
Candidates
Candidate	Experience	Campaign	Ref
Ebony L. DeBerry	Community organizer Former Chicago Public Schools teacher and parent Former Local School Council member		
Margaret "Maggie" Cullerton Hooper			
Kate Doyle	Non-profit co-founder Former teacher		
Bruce Leon	Democratic committeeman for the 50th ward Board member of Arie Crown Hebrew Day School		

The following candidate withdrew before ballot certification:

- Daniel Steven Kleinman

=== Endorsements ===
Ebony L. DeBerry

State elected officials

- Mike Simmons, member of the Illinois Senate

Local elected officials

- Angela Clay, member of Chicago City Council for the 46th ward
- Maria Hadden, member of Chicago City Council for the 49th ward
- Andre Vasquez, member of Chicago City Council for the 40th ward (co-endorsed with Kate Doyle)

Labor unions

- Chicago Teachers Union
- Cook County Teachers Union

Organizations

- Our Schools Chicago
- Asian American Midwest Progressives (co-endorsed with Kate Doyle)
Maggie Cullerton Hooper

Federal elected officials

- Jan Schakowsky, U.S. Representative for Illinois' 9th congressional district
- Mike Quigley, U.S. Representative for Illinois' 5th congressional district

Local elected officials

- Anna M. Valencia, Chicago City Clerk

Labor unions

- Teamsters Joint Council 25
- IUOE Local 150 and 399

Organizations

- CPS Parents for Buses (co-endorsed with Kate Doyle)
Kate Doyle

Local elected officials

- Bridget Degnen, Cook County Commissioner
- Andre Vasquez, member of Chicago City Council for the 40th ward (co-endorsed with Ebony DeBerry)
- Maggie O’Keefe, Democratic Committeeperson for the 40th ward

Labor unions

- Ironworkers Local 63

Organizations

- 40th Ward Democrats
- Personal PAC
- Northside Democracy for America
- Asian American Midwest Progressives (co-endorsed with Ebony DeBerry)
- CPS Parents for Buses (co-endorsed with Maggie Cullerton Hooper)
Bruce Leon

State elected officials

- Ram Villivalam, member of Illinois Senate
- Kevin Olickal, member of the Illinois House of Representatives

Local elected officials

- Debra Silverstein, member of the Chicago City Council for the 50th ward
- Gilbert Villegas, member of the Chicago City Council for the 36th ward

=== Results ===
2024 Chicago Board of Education District 2 election
Party	Candidate	Votes	%
Nonpartisan	Ebony L. DeBerry	41,258	43.43
Nonpartisan	Bruce Leon	19,218	20.23
Nonpartisan	Kate Doyle	18,639	19.62
Nonpartisan	Margaret "Maggie" Cullerton Hooper	15,878	16.71
Total votes		94,993	100.0

== District 3 ==
=== Candidates ===
Candidates
Candidate	Experience	Campaign	Ref
Carlos A. Rivas Jr.	Spokesperson for the Civilian Office of Police Accountability; Former charter school counselor		
Jason C. Dones	Non-profit executive Former teacher and leader at Teach For America		
Kirk J. Ortiz	Vice president of private security company		

=== Endorsements ===
Carlos A. Rivas

Organizations

- Illinois Network of Charter Schools
Jason C. Dones

Federal elected officials

- Delia Ramirez, U.S. Representative for Illinois' 3rd district

State elected officials

- Omar Aquino, member of Illinois Senate
- Will Guzzardi, member of Illinois House of Representatives

Local elected officials

- Anthony Quezada, Cook County Commissioner
- Daniel La Spata, member of the Chicago City Council for the 1st ward
- Jessie Fuentes, member of the Chicago City Council for the 26th ward
- Ruth Cruz, member of the Chicago City Council for the 30th ward
- Rossana Rodriguez-Sanchez, member of the Chicago City Council for the 33rd ward
- Carlos Ramirez-Rosa, member of the Chicago City Council for the 35th ward

Labor unions

- Chicago Teachers Union

=== Results ===
2024 Chicago Board of Education District 3 election
Party	Candidate	Votes	%
Nonpartisan	Carlos A. Rivas, Jr.	41,023	54.13
Nonpartisan	Jason C. Dones	34,769	45.87
Total votes		75,792	100.0

== District 4 ==
=== Candidates ===
Candidates
Candidate	Experience	Campaign	Ref
Karen Zaccor	Chicago Public Schools teacher Former Local School Council member		
Ellen Rosenfeld	Family and community engagement manager at Chicago Public Schools; Former CPS teacher and parent		
Kimberly Brown	Marketing professional and adjunct professor Chicago Public Schools parent		
Thomas Day	Non-profit co-founder		
Carmen Gioiosa	Chicago Public Schools parent and Local School Council member Former CPS administrator and teacher		
Andrew A. Davis	Chicago Public Schools parent Former Local School Council member		

=== Endorsements ===
Karen Zaccor

Local elected officials

- Angela Clay, member of the Chicago City Council for the 46th ward
- Sean Tenner, Democratic Committeeperson for the 46th ward

Labor unions

- Chicago Teachers Union
Ellen Rosenfeld

Federal elected officials

- Jan Schakowsky, U.S. Representative for Illinois' 9th district

State elected officials

- Robert Martwick, member of Illinois Senate
- Ann Williams, member of Illinois House of Representatives
Thomas Day

Local elected officials

- Scott Waguespack, member of Chicago City Council for the 32nd ward
- Bill Conway, member of the Chicago City Council for the 34th ward
Andrew A. Davis

Local elected officials

- James Cappleman, former member of Chicago City Council for the 46th ward

=== Results ===
2024 Chicago Board of Education District 4 election
Party	Candidate	Votes	%
Nonpartisan	Ellen Rosenfeld	49,351	41.62
Nonpartisan	Karen Zaccor	35,825	30.22
Nonpartisan	Kimberly Brown	11,128	9.39
Nonpartisan	Thomas Day	9,126	7.70
Nonpartisan	Carmen Gioiosa	8,414	7.10
Nonpartisan	Andrew A. Davis	4,719	3.98
Total votes		118,563	100.0

== District 5 ==
=== Candidates ===
Candidates
Candidate	Experience	Campaign	Ref
Aaron "Jitu" Brown	Community organizer		
Michilla "Kyla" Blaise	Chicago Public Schools parent Chief of staff for Cook County Commissioner Frank Aguilar		

The following candidate were removed from the ballot due to insufficient petition signatures:

- Anthony Hargrove
- Jousef M. Shkoukani
- Kernetha Jones

=== Endorsements ===
Aaron "Jitu" Brown

Labor unions

- Chicago Teachers Union

=== Results ===
2024 Chicago Board of Education District 5 election
Party	Candidate	Votes	%
Nonpartisan	Aaron "Jitu" Brown	40,249	97.27
Nonpartisan	Kernetha Jones (Write-in)	65	0.16
Nonpartisan	Jousef M. Shkoukani (Write-in)	1,063	2.57
Total votes		41,377	100.0

== District 6 ==
=== Candidates ===
Candidates
Candidate	Experience	Campaign	Ref
Jessica Biggs	Chicago Public Schools parent Former teacher and school principal		
Anusha Thotakura	Deputy director of advocacy organization Former teacher		
Andre Smith	Entrepreneur; Candidate for Illinois House of Representatives 5th district in 2024 Democratic primary		

The following candidate withdrew before ballot certification:

- Danielle J. Wallace

The following candidate was removed due to insufficient ballot petition signatures:

- Brenda I. Delgado

=== Endorsements ===
Anusha Thotakura

State elected officials

- Robert Martwick, member of Illinois Senate

Labor unions

- Chicago Teachers Union
Jessica Biggs

Local elected officials

- Toni Preckwinkle, President of the Cook County Board of Commissioners
- Jeanette Taylor, member of the Chicago City Council for the 20th ward
Andre Smith

Organizations

- Illinois Network of Charter Schools

=== Results ===
2024 Chicago Board of Education District 6 election
Party	Candidate	Votes	%
Nonpartisan	Jessica Biggs	40,109	44.58
Nonpartisan	Anusha Thotakura	29,015	32.25
Nonpartisan	Andre Smith	20,656	22.96
Nonpartisan	Danielle Wallace (Write-in)	181	0.20
Total votes		89,961	100.0

== District 7 ==
=== Candidates ===
Candidates
Candidate	Experience	Campaign	Ref
Yesenia Lopez	Latino outreach director for Governor J. B. Pritzker's campaign		
Eva A. Villalobos	Accountant		
Raquel Don	Chicago Public Schools parent and Local School Council member		

The following candidates were removed from the ballot due to insufficient ballot petition signatures:

- Felipe "Phil" Luna Jr.
- Jesus Ayala Jr.

=== Endorsements ===
Yesenia Lopez

Federal elected officials

- Chuy García, U.S. Representative for Illinois' 4th district

Labor unions

- Chicago Teachers Union
Eva Villalobos

Organizations

- Illinois Network of Charter Schools

=== Results ===
2024 Chicago Board of Education District 7 election
Party	Candidate	Votes	%
Nonpartisan	Yesenia Lopez	29,622	56.83
Nonpartisan	Eva A. Villalobos	17,371	33.33
Nonpartisan	Raquel Don	5,131	9.84
Total votes		52,124	100.0

== District 8 ==
=== Candidates ===
Candidates
Candidate	Experience	Campaign	Ref
Angel Gutierrez	Executive at private high school Former leader at Catholic Charities of the Archdiocese of Chicago		
Felix Ponce	Chicago Public Schools teacher		

The following candidate withdrew before ballot certification:

- Darius Dee Nix

=== Endorsements ===
Angel Gutierrez

Organizations

- Illinois Network of Charter Schools
Felix Ponce

Local elected officials

- Julia Ramirez, member of the Chicago City Council for the 12th ward

Labor unions

- Chicago Teachers Union

=== Results ===
2024 Chicago Board of Education District 8 election
Party	Candidate	Votes	%
Nonpartisan	Angel Gutierrez	41,979	62.77
Nonpartisan	Felix Ponce	24,903	37.23
Total votes		66,882	100.0

== District 9 ==
=== Candidates ===
Candidates
Candidate	Experience	Campaign	Ref
Therese Boyle	School psychologist		
Brittany Bailey Preston	Local School Council member		
Lanetta M. Thomas	Community activist		
La'Mont Raymond Williams	Chief of staff for Cook County Commissioner Bill Lowry		
Miquel Lewis	Acting director of Cook County Juvenile Probation & Court Services; Former appointed member of Board of Education		

=== Endorsements ===
Lanetta Thomas

Labor unions

- Chicago Teachers Union
Miquel Lewis

Organizations

- Illinois Network of Charter Schools

=== Results ===
2024 Chicago Board of Education District 9 election
Party	Candidate	Votes	%
Nonpartisan	Therese Boyle	33,140	36.31
Nonpartisan	Lanetta M. Thomas	26,568	29.11
Nonpartisan	La'Mont Raymond Williams	16,197	17.75
Nonpartisan	Miquel Lewis	15,355	16.83
Total votes		91,260	100.0

== District 10 ==
=== Candidates ===
Candidates
Candidate	Experience	Campaign	Ref
Adam Parrott-Sheffer	Chicago Public Schools parent Former principal in CPS and suburbs Former district administrator in New York City		
Che "Rhymefest" Smith	Rapper and community activist		
Karin Norington-Reaves	Consultant; Candidate for Illinois's 1st congressional district in 2022		
Robert Jones	Pastor at Mt. Carmel Missionary Baptist Church		

The following candidates withdrew before ballot certification:

- Rosita Chatonda
- James M. Walton Jr.

The following candidate was removed from the ballot due to insufficient petition signatures:

- Nathaniel "Nate" Ward

=== Endorsements ===
Che Smith

State elected officials

- Alexi Giannoulias, Illinois Secretary of State
Karin Norington-Reaves

Organizations

- Illinois Network of Charter Schools
Robert Jones

Labor unions

- Chicago Teachers Union

=== Results ===
2024 Chicago Board of Education District 10 election
Party	Candidate	Votes	%
Nonpartisan	Che "Rhymefest" Smith	25,922	32.21
Nonpartisan	Karin Norington-Reaves	23,543	29.25
Nonpartisan	Robert Jones	18,132	22.53
Nonpartisan	Adam Parrott-Sheffer	12,803	15.91
Nonpartisan	Rosita Chatonda (Write-in)	87	0.11
Total votes		80,487	100.0
