= Angela Clay =

American politician and activist

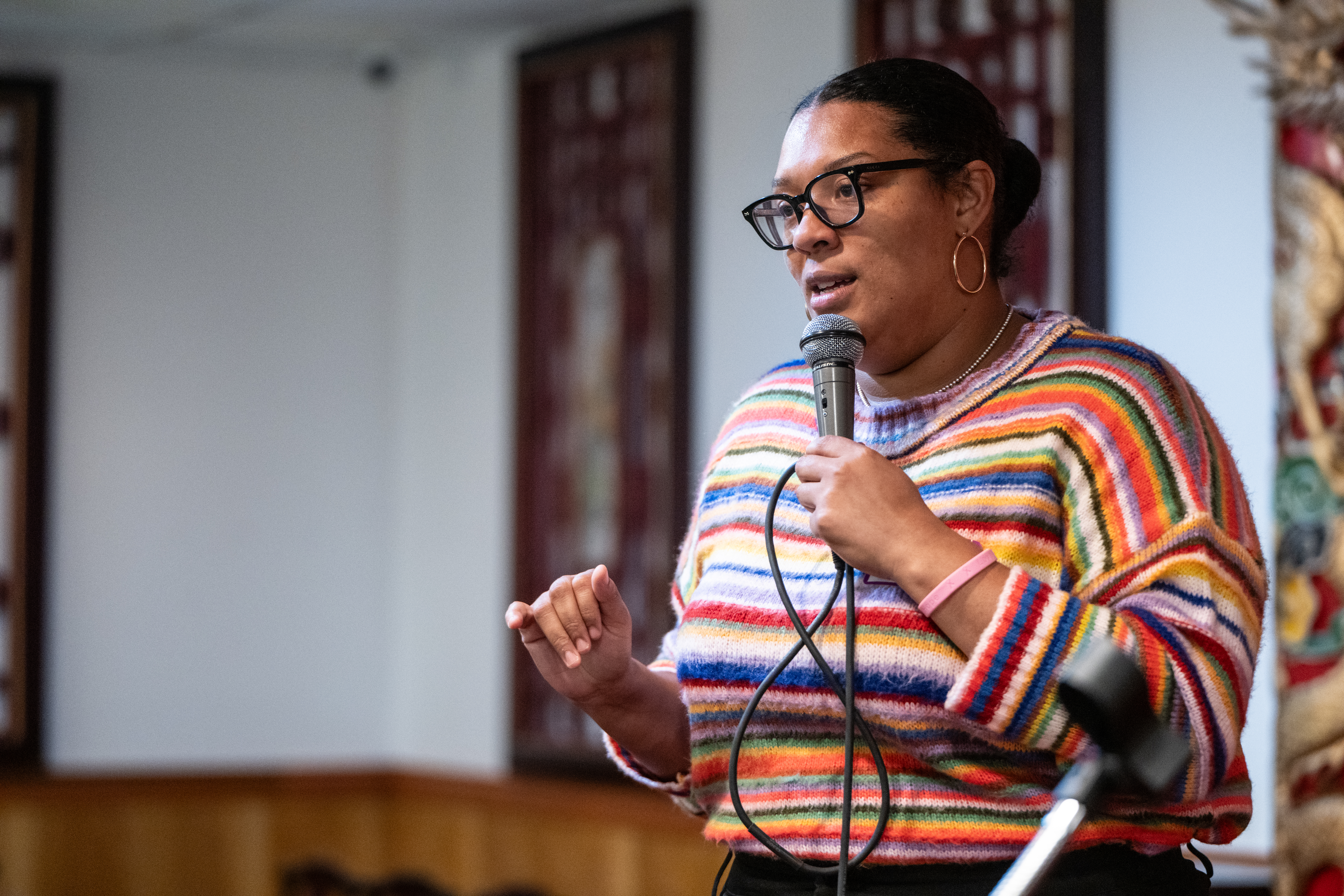

Member of the Chicago City Council from the 46th ward
- Incumbent
- Assumed office May 15, 2023
- Preceded by: James Cappleman

Personal details
- Born: March 30, 1991 (age 35) Chicago, Illinois, U.S
- Party: Democratic
- Education: DePaul University (BA)
- Website: www.46thward.com

Angela Clay is an American politician and activist. She is the alderwoman for the 46th ward in the Chicago City Council, having won the 2023 election for the office. The 46th ward includes portions of the Uptown and Lakeview neighborhoods.

== Early life and career ==
Clay grew up in Uptown, Chicago, where she attended Joseph Brennemann Elementary School and Uplift High School. She earned a Bachelor of Science degree in public policy from DePaul University. She worked as a community organizer with Northside Action for Justice and served as the board president for Voice of the People, an affordable housing nonprofit. She also served as a community representative on the local school council for Brennemann Elementary School.

== Alderperson campaigns ==
In the 2019 election, Clay challenged incumbent 46th ward alderman James Cappleman. She placed fourth in the first round election, and Cappleman went on to win the runoff.

In the 2023 election, Clay once again announced her run for alderperson of the 46th ward, which was an open seat due to Cappleman's pending retirement. In the first round election on February 28, 2023, she placed first with 36.1% of the vote and advanced to the runoff against Kim Walz. Clay received endorsements and contributions from several unions including the Chicago Teachers Union, the Illinois Nurses Association, and the Service Employees International Union. She also received support from progressive elected officials such as Maria Hadden, Matt Martin, Mike Simmons, and members of the City Council Democratic Socialist Caucus, former 46th ward alderwoman Helen Shiller, and local organizations such as ONE People's Campaign, Asian American Midwest Progressives, and Jewish Council on Urban Affairs Votes. The race became the only City Council election where campaign contribution limits were lifted, due to expenditures supporting Walz surpassing $100,000. On April 4, Clay won the runoff election.

== Chicago City Council (2023-present) ==
Upon taking office, Clay said that her early goals included summer youth programming and addressing the needs of the surge of migrants and asylum seekers being bussed to the city.

== Electoral history ==
2023 Chicago aldermanic election, 46th ward, runoff election
Party	Candidate	Votes	%
Nonpartisan	Angela Clay	9,963	56.18%
Nonpartisan	Kim Walz	7,772	43.82%
Total votes		17,735	100%

2023 Chicago aldermanic election, 46th ward, general election
Party	Candidate	Votes	%
Nonpartisan	Angela Clay	5,663	36.1
Nonpartisan	Kim Walz	4,048	25.8
Nonpartisan	Marianne Lalonde	2,760	17.6
Nonpartisan	Patrick Nagle	1,764	11.3
Nonpartisan	Roushaunda Williams	1,154	7.4
Nonpartisan	Michael Cortez	283	1.8
Total votes		15,672	100.0

2019 Chicago aldermanic election, 46th ward, general election
Party	Candidate	Votes	%
Nonpartisan	James Cappleman (incumbent)	6,082	44.07
Nonpartisan	Marianne Lalonde	2,494	18.07
Nonpartisan	Erika Wozniak Francis	2,324	16.84
Nonpartisan	Angela Clay	2,127	15.41
Nonpartisan	Justin Kreindler	545	3.95
Nonpartisan	Jon-Robert McDowell	229	1.66
Total votes		13,801	100

== See also ==
- List of Chicago alderpersons since 1923
