= 2019 Chicago Public Schools strike =

Labor strike

2019 Chicago Public Schools Labor Strike
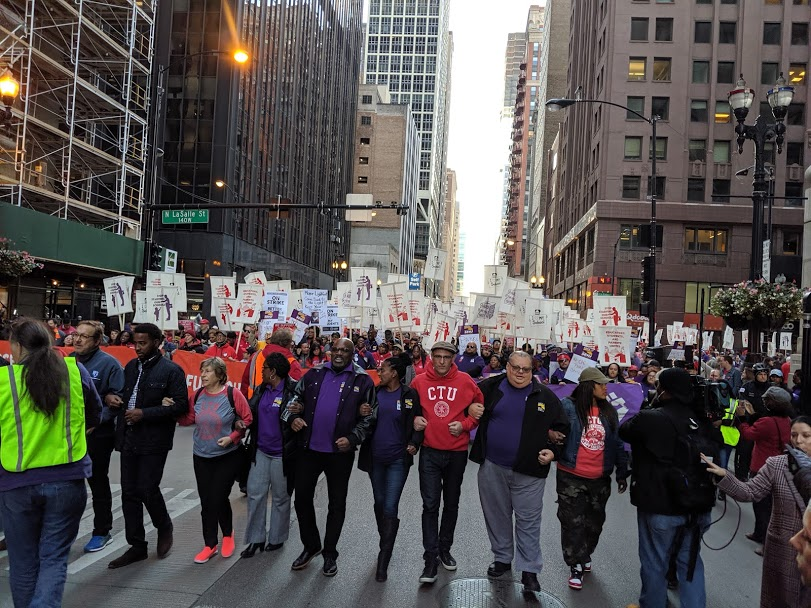
- CTU and SEIU members march through downtown Chicago on October 17th, 2019
- Date: 17–31 October 2019; (15 days)
- Location: Chicago, IL
- Goals: Better compensation, increase in staffing, wrap-around services, smaller class sizes
- Methods: Strikes, Demonstrations

Parties
Chicago Teachers Union, Service Employees International Union	Chicago Public Schools, Mayor of Chicago

Lead figures
Jesse Sharkey, Stacy Davis Gates	Lori Lightfoot, Janice Jackson

Number
~ 36,000 CPS Teachers and Staff	

Casualties
- Deaths: 0
- Injuries: 0
- Arrested: 9 CTU Members

The 2019 Chicago Public Schools strike was a labor dispute between Chicago Public Schools and the Chicago Teachers Union (which represents the school district's teachers and some of the paraprofessional and school related personnel) and the Service Employees International Union Local 73 (which represents the district's support staff and a majority of the paraprofessional and school related personnel) that lasted 14 days. The strike began on October 17, 2019, when both unions failed to reach a contract agreement with Chicago Public Schools over compensation, benefits, staffing, wrap-around services such as counselors, nurses, and librarians, and caps on class sizes. On October 31, the strike officially ended when the mayor and the Chicago Teachers Union reached a tentative agreement allowing students to go back to class on November 1, 2019. The agreement included millions of dollars dedicated to reducing class sizes, hundreds more social workers, nurses and librarians, and a 16 percent salary increase over the coming five years, but did not achieve all the main goals of the unions.

== Background ==
After the expiration of the Chicago Public Schools (CPS) contract with the Chicago Teachers Union (CTU) in June 2019, a contract dispute emerged. CPS initially offered the union a 14% raise over 5 years while the union was seeking 15% over 3 years. The district proposed a 1.5% increase in healthcare costs while the union sought to maintain their current contributions. An independent fact-finder report suggested that the district offer a 16% raise over 5 years, and a 1% increase in healthcare costs. The district accepted the report, but the union rejected it. On top of pay and healthcare, the two sides disagreed on the length of the contract; the district proposed a 5-year contract while the union proposed a 3-year contract.

On September 24, 2019, CTU hosted a rally alongside SEIU Local 73 representing school support staff and Chicago Park District workers featuring Vermont senator and presidential candidate Bernie Sanders. Sanders was joined on the stage by city alderman, other labor activists, and actor John Cusack.

On September 27, 2019, CTU members voted to authorize a potential strike starting on October 17 if a contract deal was not reached with 94% of its members voting in favor of a strike. The union's top priorities in contract negotiations are reducing classroom size and increasing the number of support staff such as nurses, librarians and social worker.

On July 16, 2019, SEIU Local 73 which represents the district's support staff such as custodians, bus aids, and security guards authorized a strike with a 97% approval vote from its members after contract negotiations stalled between the district and the union after their contract expired in June 2018. The union cited work schedules, compensation, staffing and benefits as points of conflicts in their contract negotiations.

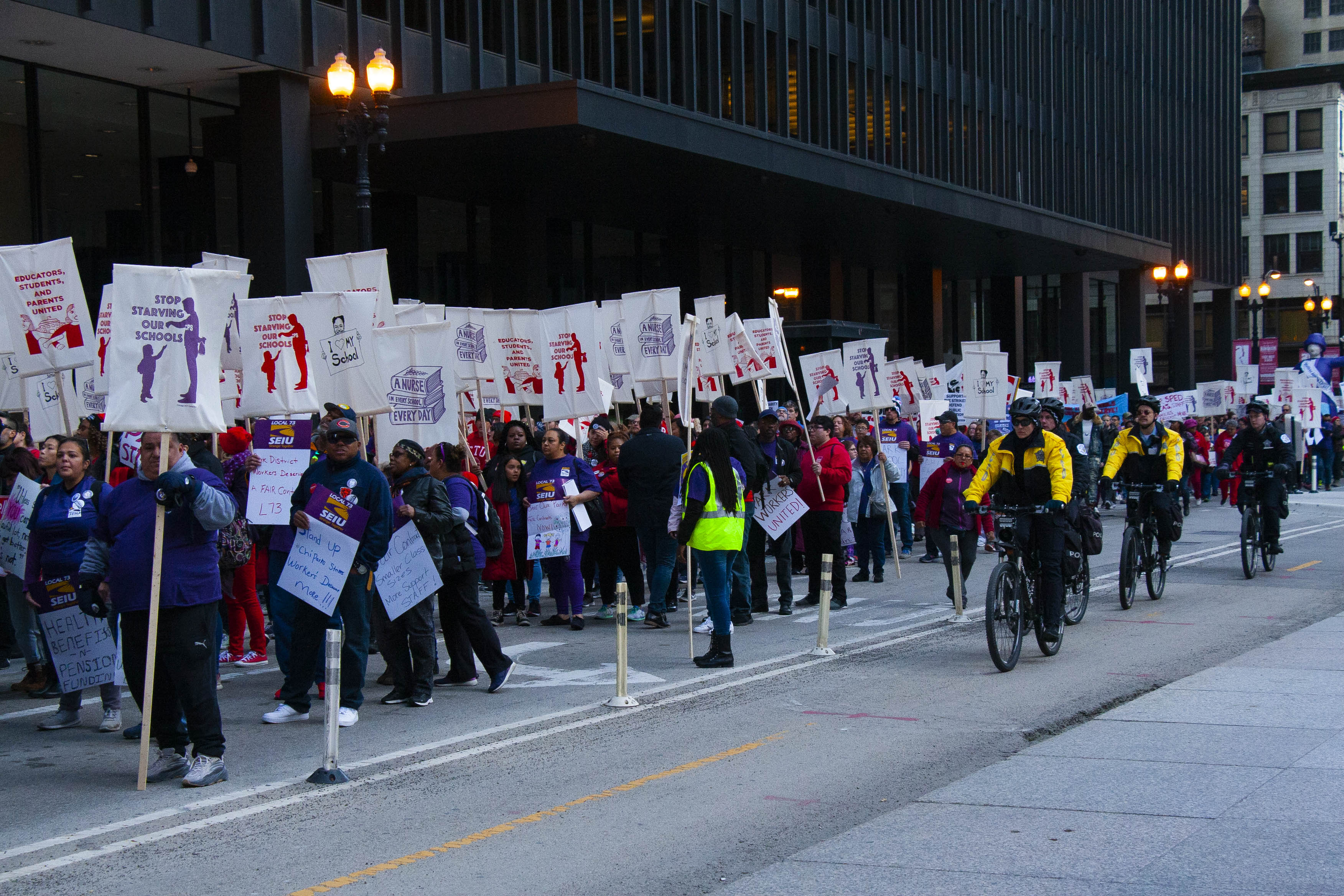
Chicago Teachers Unions, SEIU Local 73, and their supporters rally downtown for a fair contract on October 14th, 2019.

On October 14, 2019, the CTU and SEIU Local 73 held a rally for a fair contract in downtown Chicago 3 days before the strike. Despite progress made over the weekend prior, both sides remained divided on class sizes and staffing shortages.

On October 16, 2019, the CTU held its house of delegates meeting where the bargaining team presented the board's final offer. The union delegates voted to reject the district's latest contract proposal leading to the beginning of a joint strike with SEIU Local 73 at 12:01 am on October 17 leaving roughly over 300,000 students out of school.

On October 16, 2019, CPS cancelled classes for October 17, 2019, in anticipation of the CTU strike. CTU delegates officially voted to go on strike hours afterwards.

== Strike and Actions ==
=== October 17th ===
On October 17, 2019, at 12:01 am, members of the Chicago Teachers Union and the SEIU Local 73, walked off the job. Pickets in front of schools began at 6:30 am until 10:30 am followed by a rally downtown later in the day.

The CTU and SEIU Local 73 began a rally outside Chicago Public Schools headquarters in downtown Chicago at around 1:30 pm. At around 2:30 pm, the demonstrators began marching through the loop towards to Millennium Park.

=== October 18th ===
On October 18, 2019, the strike entered its second days as neither the CTU and SEIU Local 73 were able to reach a contract agreement. CPS staff members of the CTU and SEIU began picketing outside schools at 6:30 am to 10:30 am. The two unions held another rally downtown later that day.

=== October 21st ===
On October 21, the strike entered its 5th day and 3rd school day. Union members returned to the picket line from 6:30 am to 10:30 am.

=== October 22nd ===
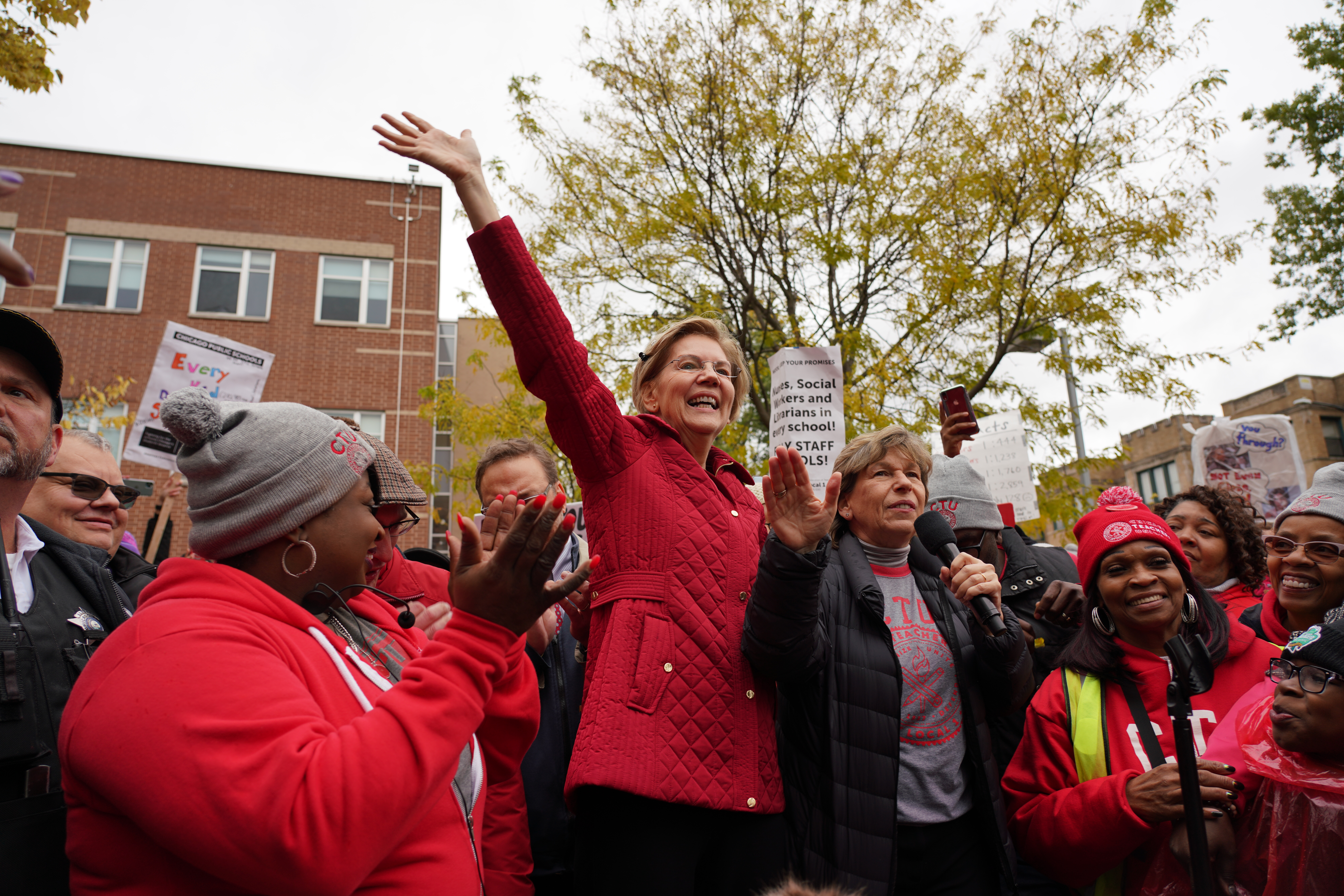
Elizabeth Warren joining strikers

On October 22, 2019, the strike entered its 6th day and 4th school day. Union members picketed from 6:30 am to 10:30 am. Massachusetts senator and 2020 presidential candidate Elizabeth Warren joined teachers on the picket line outside Oscar DePriest Elementary School in the South Austin neighborhood. Warren expressed her support for the striking CPS workers.

=== October 23rd ===
On October 23, union members only picketed until 8:00 am in front of schools. At 8:00 am, CTU members, SEIU 73, and their supporters rallied at various locations near the loop [311 S Wacker Park (Jackson/Wacker), Swisshotel (near Wacker/Columbus, D’Angelo Park (Harrison/Franklin, Millennium Park (Randolph/Michigan) ] and converged into one march around City Hall during the mayor's budget address to the city. City officials as well as the Chicago Police Department urged the public to avoid driving in the loop and to use public transportation due to the large number of street closures due to the march.

=== October 24th ===
On October 24, union members returned to the picket lines in front of schools from 6:30 am to 10:30 am. At 3:00 pm., the CTU held a civil disobedience training at their union headquarters.

=== October 29th ===
On October 29, the CTU and SEIU marched to the Sterling Bay Headquarters to demand that the development return TIF funds given to the company that should have gone to schools. At the development, 9 CTU members were arrested when they did a sit-in located in the lobby of the Sterling Bay Headquarters. Chicago police said they were called just before 2 p.m. to a building in the 1300 block of West Fulton "where numerous individuals were inside and refusing to leave." "Police gave the offenders warnings to leave the building, which were refused," a statement from Chicago Police News Affairs read.

=== October 30th ===
During a House of Delegates vote in October 30, the union agreed to accept a tentative agreement in a 362–242 vote. A press conference later that night reinforced the mayor's stance that the days missed during the strike would not be made up.

== Reactions ==
=== Chicago Public Schools ===
- On August 26, 2019, Chicago Public Schools accepted the independent fact-finder report of a 16% raise over a 5-year contract and a 1% increase in healthcare costs for staff, and officially amended their original offer which was 14% over a 5-year contract with a 1.5% increase in healthcare contributions for its staff represented by the CTU.
- On September 16, 2019, Chicago Public Schools accepted the independent fact-finder report of a 16% raise for its staff represented by the SEIU Local 73.
- On October 4, 2019, Chicago Public Schools released a contingency plan in the event of a work stoppage to provide CPS students with access to school buildings and meals.
- On October 16, 2019, Chicago Public Schools cancels classes hours ahead of the CTU house of delegates meeting as a result of the expected strike between CPS and the CTU and SEIU Local 73.
- On October 17, 2019, Chicago Public Schools cancels classes for Friday October 18 when the district is unable to reach an agreement with the CTU and SEIU Local 73.
- On October 20, 2019, Chicago Public Schools announced that classes on Monday October 21 were cancelled after neither union was able to reach an agreement with the district.
- On October 21, 2019, Chicago Public Schools cancelled classes for Tuesday October 22.
- On October 22, 2019, Chicago Public Schools cancelled classes for Wednesday October 23.
- On October 23, 2019, Chicago Public Schools cancelled classes for Thursday October 24 due to the on-going strike of the CTU and SEIU Local 73.
- On October 24, 2019, Chicago Public Schools cancelled classes for Friday October 25.

=== Chicago Teachers Union ===
- On August 26, 2019, the Chicago Teachers Union rejected an independent fact-finding report that suggests a 16% raise over 5 years and a 1% increase in healthcare costs. The union continued to propose a 15% raise with no increase in healthcare cost over a 3-year contract citing rising cost of living and low-wages for PSRPs.
- On September 26, 2019, the Chicago Teachers Union authorized a strike with 94% of its membership voting in favor of a strike.
- On October 2, 2019, the Chicago Teachers Union's house of delegates set a strike date for October 17, the same strike deadline as the SEIU Local 73
- On October 16, 2019, The Chicago Teachers Union's house of delegates officially rejected the district's last contract proposal before the strike deadline causing the union to be on strike beginning at 12:01 am on October 17.
- On October 21, CTU President, Jesse Sharkey, responded to a letter sent to the union from Mayor Lori Lightfoot asking the union to return to work and continue negotiations. Sharkey responded that the letter from the mayor "has dashed our hopes for a quick settlement,” and warned that the strike may be prolonged.
- On October 21, 2019, the Chicago Teachers Union invited and proposed that Rev. Jesse Jackson join in on contract negotiations.
- On October 25, 2019, the Chicago Teachers Union held a press conference at Lane Tech saying that there was good progress happening in negotiations.

=== Lori Lightfoot ===
- On October 21, 2019, Lori Lightfoot sent a letter to Shakey and the CTU asking the union to end the strike and continue negotiations. Lightfoot cited that the strike was having a negative impact on students athletes, students who need to apply to colleges, and the education of Chicago students. Lightfoot also mentioned the hardship of the strike on Chicago's families, some of whom struggled with finding child care during the strike.
- On October 23, 2019, Lightfoot presented her first budget address to the Chicago City Council and stated that the city of Chicago will not 'bail out' CPS to reach a contract agreement with the CTU. "What we’ve been very clear about, is they’ve got to live within their means, whatever those means are and they can’t exceed that, and look to the city to bail them out.” Lightfoot claimed that the current CTU proposal on staffing and class sizes would cost the city $2.6 billion over 3 years which the city does not have.
- On October 24, 2019, Lightfoot provided that the district and the union were bargaining, but it was not fast enough to resolve the contract dispute and end the strike.

=== SEIU Local 73 ===
- On July 15, CPS staff represented by the SEIU Local 73 authorized a strike for October 17 with 97% of its members voting in favor of a strike.
- On September 16, SEIU Local 73 rejected an independent fact-finder report citing that the report did not address the low income of special education assistants, work schedules, and the 'well-being of special education students.' The union rejected the fact-finder's proposed 16% raise for support staff .

=== Public reaction ===
The Chicago Sun-Times/ABC7 Poll found 49% of voters either strongly or somewhat support a walkout, while 38% are opposed. CPS parents were more likely to support a strike, and some blamed Lightfoot for the ordeal.

Several national politicians who are candidates in the 2020 Democratic Party presidential primaries have expressed support for the unions during the strike. Vermont Senator Bernie Sanders spoke at a rally hosted by CTU and SEIU Local 73 on September 24. New Jersey Senator Cory Booker met with a group of teachers to show his support. Massachusetts Senator Elizabeth Warren joined strikers on the picket line on October 22. Former Vice President Joe Biden called the leadership of the CTU and expressed his support for the strike on October 24.
