= Stacy Davis Gates =

American labor leader and educator

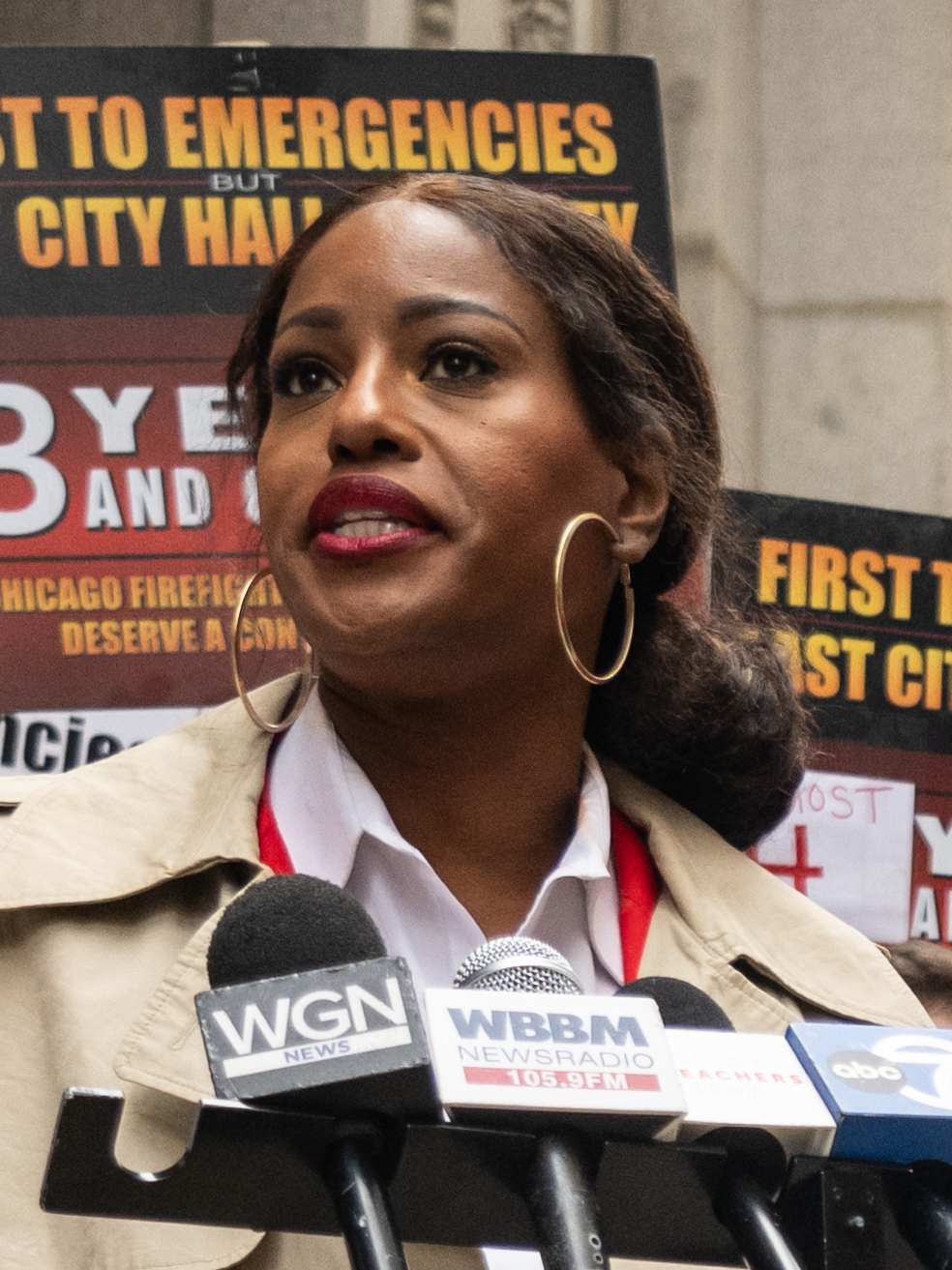
- Davis Gates in 2025

President of the Chicago Teachers Union
- Incumbent
- Assumed office July 1, 2022
- Vice President: Jackson Potter
- Preceded by: Jesse Sharkey

Personal details
- Born: December 25, 1976 (age 49) South Bend, Indiana, U.S.
- Education: Saint Mary's College (BA); University of Notre Dame; Concordia University Chicago

Stacy Davis Gates (born December 25, 1976) is an American labor leader and educator. She is president of the Chicago Teachers Union (CTU). In May 2022, she was elected president of the union after previously serving as vice president under Jesse Sharkey.

== Early life ==
Davis Gates grew up in South Bend, Indiana in a middle class household. Her first job was a union job working in the cafeteria at the Memorial Hospital of South Bend. She graduated with a Bachelor of Arts in political science from St. Mary's College in 1999. Later she studied nonprofit management at the University of Notre Dame and educational administration at Concordia University Chicago.

== Career ==
=== Teaching career ===
Davis Gates began her career teaching history in 2004 at Englewood Technical Prep Academy High School, a public school on the south side of Chicago, Illinois. In 2008, the school was closed as part of a series of closures led by the CEO of Chicago Public Schools (CPS), Arne Duncan, Davis Gates attributes this as the moment she was "radicalized."

After the closure of Englewood Technical Prep Academy, Davis Gates transitioned to Roberto Clemente Community Academy in the Ukrainian Village neighborhood of Chicago. In May 2008, Davis Gates was one of 12 elected delegates for the Chicago Teachers Union who formed the Caucus of Rank-and-File Educators (CORE).

=== Chicago Teachers Union ===
In 2011, Davis Gates joined the staff of the Chicago Teachers Union as political director.

==== Vice President ====
In 2018, Jesse Sharkey succeeded Karen Lewis as president and Davis Gates was chosen as Sharkey's vice president following the recommendation of Lewis.

As Vice President, she oversaw a 14-day strike in 2019, over failures to reach a contract. The majority of her time as vice president was characterized by the COVID-19 pandemic; in April 2020, Illinois Governor J.B. Pritzker closed all schools to in-person instruction for the remainder of the school year. In October of that year CPS announced a plan to return to in-person instruction, which Davis Gates and the CTU opposed. Chicago Public Schools returned to in-person instruction in January 2021, despite concerns of the union and discussions of a potential strike from Davis Gates. In January 2022, the CTU went on a 5-day work-stoppage over safety concerns following a rise in COVID-19 cases.

In 2021, Governor Pritzker signed HB 2908 into law, establishing a fully elected board of education in Chicago by 2027, supported by the CTU and Davis Gates.

==== President ====
In February 2022, CTU President Jesse Sharkey announced he would not seek reelection. In May of that year Davis Gates and the rest of the Caucus of Rank-and-File Educators (CORE) were elected with 56% of the vote and she took office in July.

In August 2022, she denied speculation that she would run for mayor in the upcoming 2023 election, instead endorsing CTU organizer and Cook County Commissioner Brandon Johnson. As president of the union, Davis Gates oversaw large contributions to Johnson's mayoral campaign; including, donating $8 per month per member's dues, to controversy and mixed support among CTU members. CTU contributed $2.4 million to fund the mayoral campaign, which Johnson ultimately won in an April runoff.

In an August 2023 interview with South Side Weekly, Davis Gates expressed optimism for the union's future relationship with the mayor and elected school board.

== Personal life ==
Davis Gates lives on the south side of Chicago with her husband and three children.

In September 2023, Davis Gates faced controversy when it was revealed that her son was attending a private high school, not a public school. Critics highlighted her past statements criticizing school choice initiatives, whereas Davis Gates highlighted her son's enrollment as representing a larger issue of disinvestment in public schools.
