= 2026 Chicago Board of Education election =

- November 3, 2026

The Chicago Board of Education election took place on November 3, 2026, alongside the statewide general elections, to elect all twenty members and the Board President. This election was the first time the entire board was elected since its formation in 1837, following the 2024 election where half the board members were elected.

Board members elected in half of the districts (1B, 2A, 3B, 4B, 5A, 6B, 7B, 8A, 9B, and 10A), where the current incumbent was elected in 2024, will serve four-year terms. Board members in the other half of the districts (1A, 2B, 3A, 4A, 5B, 6A, 7A, 8B, 9A, and 10B), where the current incumbent was appointed by the Mayor, will serve two-year terms. Starting in 2028, elections will be held for four-year terms in staggered two-year intervals.

== Board President ==
=== Candidates ===
==== Declared ====
- Jessica Biggs, incumbent Board member
- Hilario Dominguez
- Victor Henderson

==== Withdrawn ====
- Jennifer Custer, incumbent Board member
- Sendhil Revuluri

=== Endorsements ===
Jessica Biggs

Labor unions

- SEIU Illinois State Council
Hilario Dominguez

Labor unions

- Chicago Teachers Union
Sendhil Revuluri

Organizations

- Chicago Democrats for Education

== District 1A ==
=== Candidates ===
==== Declared ====
- Ed Bannon
- Margie B. Luczak

=== Endorsements ===
Ed Bannon

Labor unions

- Chicago Teachers Union
- SEIU Illinois State Council
Margie Luczak

Labor unions

- IUOE Local 150

Organizations

- Illinois Network for Charter Schools Action PAC
- The Urban Center

== District 1B ==
=== Candidates ===
==== Declared ====
- Claudia Peralta
- Michelle N. Pierre

=== Endorsements ===
Claudia Peralta

Labor unions

- Chicago Teachers Union
- SEIU Illinois State Council
Michele Pierre

Organizations

- Common Ground Collective
- Illinois Network for Charter Schools Action PAC
- Leadership for Educational Equity
- The Urban Center

== District 2A ==
=== Candidates ===
==== Declared ====
- Ebony DeBerry, incumbent Board member
- Bruce Leon
- Hector Morales

=== Endorsements ===
Ebony DeBerry

Labor unions

- Chicago Teachers Union
- SEIU Illinois State Council

Organizations

- ONE People's Campaign
Hector Morales

Organizations

- Common Ground Collective
- The Urban Center

== District 2B ==
=== Candidates ===
==== Declared ====
- Daniel Basco
- Kyna Lenhof
- Debby Pope, incumbent Board member

=== Endorsements ===
Kyna Lenhof

Organizations

- Common Ground Collective
- Illinois Network for Charter Schools Action PAC
- The Urban Center
Debby Pope

Labor unions

- Chicago Teachers Union

Organizations

- ONE People's Campaign

== District 3A ==
=== Candidates ===
==== Declared ====
- Peter Gonzales
- Norma Rios Sierra, incumbent Board member

=== Endorsements ===
Peter Gonzales

Labor unions

- IUOE Local 150

Organizations

- Common Ground Collective
- Illinois Network for Charter Schools Action PAC
- The Urban Center
Norma Rios Sierra

Labor unions

- Chicago Teachers Union
- SEIU Illinois State Council

== District 3B ==
=== Candidates ===
==== Declared ====
- Jason Dónes
- Carlos Rivas Jr., incumbent Board member

=== Endorsements ===
Jason Dones

Labor unions

- Chicago Teachers Union

Organizations

- Our Schools PAC
Carlos Rivas Jr.

Labor unions

- IUOE Local 150
- SEIU Illinois State Council

Organizations

- Common Ground Collective
- Illinois Network for Charter Schools Action PAC
- Leadership for Educational Equity
- The Urban Center

== District 4A ==
=== Candidates ===
==== Declared ====
- Angel Alvarez
- Ellen Sherratt
- Karen Zaccor, incumbent Board member

=== Endorsements ===
Ellen Sherratt

Labor unions

- IUOE Local 150
- SEIU Illinois State Council

Organizations

- Common Ground Collective
- Illinois Network for Charter Schools Action PAC
- The Urban Center
Karen Zaccor

Labor unions

- Chicago Teachers Union

Organizations

- ONE People's Campaign
- Our Schools PAC

== District 4B ==
=== Candidates ===
==== Declared ====
- Ellen Rosenfeld, incumbent Board member

=== Endorsements ===
Ellen Rosenfeld

Labor unions

- IUOE Local 150
- SEIU Illinois State Council

Organizations

- Common Ground Collective
- Illinois Network for Charter Schools Action PAC
- Leadership for Educational Equity PAC
- The Urban Center

== District 5A ==
=== Candidates ===
==== Declared ====
- Aaron "Jitu" Brown, incumbent Board member
- LaPamela Williams

=== Endorsements ===
Aaron "Jitu" Brown

Labor unions

- Chicago Teachers Union
LaPamela Williams

Organizations

- Common Ground Collective
- Illinois Network for Charter Schools Action PAC
- The Urban Center

== District 5B ==
=== Candidates ===
==== Declared ====
- Michilla "Kyla" Blaise, incumbent Board member
- Anthony Hargrove

=== Endorsements ===
Michilla "Kyla" Blaise

Labor unions

- Chicago Teachers Union
- Our Schools PAC
Anthony Hargrove

Labor unions

- IUOE Local 150

Organizations

- Common Ground Collective
- Illinois Network for Charter Schools Action PAC
- The Urban Center

== District 6A ==
=== Candidates ===
==== Declared ====
- Brenda Lee Anderson
- Anusha Thotakura, incumbent Board member
- Isaiah White

=== Endorsements ===
Anushka Thotakura

Labor unions

- Chicago Teachers Union
- SEIU Illinois State Council

Organizations

- Our Schools PAC
Brenda Lee Anderson

Organizations

- Leadership for Educational Equity PAC
Isaiah White

Labor unions

- IUOE Local 150

Organizations

- Common Ground Collective
- Illinois Network for Charter Schools Action PAC
- The Urban Center

== District 6B ==
=== Candidates ===
==== Declared ====
- Brittany B. Kimble
- Michael L. Neal

=== Endorsements ===
Michael Neal

Organizations

- Common Ground Collective
Brittany Kimble

Organizations

- The Urban Center

== District 7A ==
=== Candidates ===
==== Declared ====
- Jesus Ayala Jr.
- Emma Lozano, incumbent Board member

=== Endorsements ===
Jesus Ayala Jr.

Labor unions

- SEIU Illinois State Council

Organizations

- Common Ground Collective
- Illinois Network for Charter Schools Action PAC
- Leadership for Educational Equity PAC
- The Urban Center
Emma Lozano

Labor unions

- Chicago Teachers Union

== District 7B ==
=== Candidates ===
==== Declared ====
- Erika E. Diaz-Chavez
- Yesenia Lopez, incumbent Board member

=== Endorsements ===
Erika Diaz-Chavez

Organizations

- Illinois Network for Charter Schools Action PAC
Yesenia Lopez

Labor unions

- SEIU Illinois State Council

== District 8A ==
=== Candidates ===
==== Declared ====
- Angel Gutierrez, incumbent Board member

=== Endorsements ===
Angel Gutierrez

Labor unions

- IUOE Local 150
- SEIU Illinois State Council

Organizations

- Common Ground Collective
- Illinois Network for Charter Schools Action PAC
- The Urban Center

== District 8B ==
=== Candidates ===
==== Declared ====
- Juan Ignacio Gonzalez

==== Write-in candidates ====
- Alexander Angeles

==== Filed but did not qualify for the ballot ====
- Cydney Wallace, incumbent Board member

=== Endorsements ===
Juan Ignacio Gonzalez

Labor unions

- IUOE Local 150

Organizations

- Common Ground Collective
- Illinois Network for Charter Schools Action PAC
- The Urban Center

== District 9A ==
=== Candidates ===
==== Declared ====
- Brittany Preston

==== Filed but did not qualify for the ballot ====
- Angel L. Velez, incumbent board member

=== Endorsements ===
Brittany Preston

Labor unions

- IUOE Local 150
- SEIU Illinois State Council

Organizations

- Common Ground Collective
- The Urban Center

== District 9B ==
=== Candidates ===
==== Declared ====
- Therese Boyle, incumbent Board member
- Katherine S. Dunneback

==== Filed but did not qualify for the ballot ====
- Marlo Barnett

=== Endorsements ===
Therese Boyle

Labor unions

- IUOE Local 150
- SEIU Illinois State Council

Organizations

- Common Ground Collective
- Leadership for Educational Equity PAC
- The Urban Center
Katherine S. Dunneback

Labor unions

- Chicago Teachers Union

Organizations

- Our Schools PAC

== District 10A ==
=== Candidates ===
==== Declared ====
- Che "Rhymefest" Smith, incumbent Board member

==== Write-in candidates ====
- Tameka Walton (filed but did not qualify for the ballot, and subsequently announced intention to run as a write-in candidate)

==== Filed but did not qualify for the ballot ====
- Krista Nichols Alston

=== Endorsements ===
Che "Rhymefest" Smith

Labor unions

- IUOE Local 150
- SEIU Illinois State Council

Organizations

- Common Ground Collective
- Illinois Network for Charter Schools PAC
- The Urban Center
Tameka Walton

Labor unions

- Chicago Teachers Union

== District 10B ==
=== Candidates ===
==== Declared ====
- Connie Anderson
- Patrick C. Watson

==== Filed but did not quality for the ballot ====
- Rosita Chatonda

=== Endorsements ===
Connie Anderson

Labor unions

- Chicago Teachers Union
Patrick Watson

Labor unions

- IUOE Local 150

Organizations

- Common Ground Collective
- The Urban Center
