= Open Hand Chicago =

Chicago non profit organization

- Open Hand Chicago
- Merged into: Chicago Community Response, Open Hand Chicago, The HIV Coalition
- Successor: Vital Bridges Food Program
- Formation: 1988; 38 years ago
- Founders: Lori Cannon; James Cappleman; Greg Harris; Tom Tunney
- Location: Chicago, Illinois, United States

Open Hand Chicago was originally founded in 1988. It was co-founded by Chicago AIDS activists including Lori Cannon, James Cappleman, Greg Harris, and Tom Tunney. Using San Francisco's Project Open Hand as a model, Open Hand Chicago delivered 41,476 meals in its first year.

Open Hand Chicago began as a food delivery service for people with HIV/AIDS. It expanded into a food pantry. In 2011 it became part of Heartland Alliance and then became Vital Bridges Food Program as part of the consolidation of Chicago Community Response, Open Hand Chicago, and The HIV Coalition.

In 1994 Open Hand Chicago was inducted into the Chicago LGBT Hall of Fame.
