= Emma Lozano =

American activist

Emma Lozano is a community grassroots activist and pastor at United Lincoln Methodist Church in Pilsen, Chicago. Since 2025, she has served as a member of the Chicago Board of Education.

== Career ==
Lozano was born in Texas, moved to Hammond, Indiana in her youth, and moved again to Chicago, Illinois in 1958 at the age of five. Lozano's activism began as a volunteer for Centro de Acción Social Autónomo (Center for Autonomous Social Action), originally founded in Los Angeles in 1968 by Bert Corona and Chole Alatorre, which she joined with her brother Rudy Lozano. Rudy's assassination in 1983 deeply influenced her to "continue the work he had started," as described by Virginia Martínez. She pursued an investigation into her brother's murder, but the case was never solved. Like her brother, Lozano worked for the election of Harold Washington. She served as a staffer in Washington's mayoral administration and later as an aid to alderman Jesús Garcia.

Lozano ran for aldermanic election of the 32nd ward in 1987, yet lost with 25% of the vote mostly from "black and Hispanic precincts." That same year, she founded the grassroots organization Centro sin Fronteras for undocumented families, first addressing the overcrowding of a local elementary school, "in which 1,200 children were jammed into a facility built to accommodate only 400 students." After leading efforts to address this issue, the Rudy Lozano School was built. The organization has since worked to address issues of bilingual education, lead poisoning, housing, police brutality, library services, youth employment, and gentrification. Centro has also addressed U.S. policies in Central America and supported social justice movements in Mexico. It has also been described as an organization "predicated on respect for and empowerment of women." Lozano has been recognized as "one of the national leaders in the immigrant rights network."

Lozano's church has been the target of white supremacist attacks for providing "sanctuary to refugees and undocumented immigrants who are appealing deportation orders." Lozano's church and other United Methodist churches in Chicago have provided sanctuary for immigrant mothers such as Elvira Arellano and Francisca Lino.

In 2024, she was appointed as a member of the Chicago Board of Education by Mayor Brandon Johnson. She is running to retain the seat in the 2026 election.
