= Lori Cannon =

American activist (1951–2025)

- Born: May 22, 1951; Chicago, Illinois, U.S.
- Died: August 3, 2025 (aged 74)
- Occupation: AIDS activist
- Known for: Co-founding Open Hand Chicago

Lori F. Cannon (May 22, 1951 – August 3, 2025) was an American AIDS activist who was based in Chicago. She was a volunteer at Chicago House and Social Service Agency, the non-profit organization providing housing and hospice during the AIDS crisis. She then worked with the NAMES Project AIDS Memorial Quilt, helping to establish the Chicago chapter. She was involved with the 1988, 1990, and 1994 installations of the quilt in Chicago, coordinating media and public relations activities.

== Biography ==
Cannon was born in Ravenswood, Chicago, on May 22, 1951. In 1988, she co-founded Open Hand Chicago together with fellow activists James Cappleman, Greg Harris, and Tom Tunney. Open Hand Chicago began as a food delivery service for people with HIV/AIDS. It expanded into a food pantry. In 2011, it became part of Heartland Alliance and then became the Vital Bridges Food Program. The same year Cannon was involved with the founding of ACT UP Chicago.

In 1994, Cannon was inducted into the Chicago LGBT Hall of Fame as a "Friend of the community". She died on August 3, 2025, at the age of 74. On May 22, 2026, the 5500 block of Broadway Avenue where Groceryland is located, was renamed Lori Cannon Way.
