= Rudy Lozano =

American activist

Rudy Lozano (July 17, 1951 – June 8, 1983) was a labor activist and community organizer from Little Village, Chicago, Illinois. Lozano was important in organizing "Black-Brown unity" in the election of Harold Washington, the first African American mayor of Chicago. Lozano was murdered shortly after Washington's election, which was "a severe setback for the Chicago Mexican community, [who] lost a dynamic, rising political star and their major liaison in the Washington camp."

== Early life and education ==
Born in Harlingen, Texas, his parents moved the family early on to Chicago's predominantly Mexican-American southwest side Pilsen neighborhood. As a student at Harrison High School and later the University of Illinois at Chicago, he organized students to demand courses on Mexican history, and for more Latin faculty. In his 20s, Lozano became an organizer for the International Ladies Garment Workers Union.

== Political career ==
In 1982, Lozano entered the race for alderman of the 22nd Ward in the city's 1983 elections, in an attempt to be the first Mexican-American elected to the Chicago City Council. He faced longtime alderman Frank Stemberk and though Lozano was defeated, failing to force a runoff by seventeen votes, he, along with his sister Emma Lozano, played an instrumental role in bringing Latino voters across the city to support candidate Harold Washington, who became Chicago's first African-American mayor. His supporters alleged that voters with Spanish surnames were purged from the rolls, denying him the votes to force a runoff. Lozano continued his work in the ILGWU, becoming the chief Midwest field organizer through his work with tortilla factory employees and other low-paid immigrant workers.

== Murder ==
On June 8, 1983, Lozano was shot to death in his home. A reputed gang member was convicted for his murder, but his supporters still contend that he was assassinated for his labor and political activities. Mayor Washington visited his widow at the home later that day, and said at Lozano's funeral that he "was a man driven by a search for unity among people."

== Legacy ==
A historical marker honoring Lozano was erected by the City of Chicago in front of Lozano's home at 4035 W. 25th Street, where he was murdered in 1983.

Today, the Pilsen branch of the Chicago Public Library is named in Lozano's honor, and his wife, sister, and sons continue his activist legacy. There is also a school called Rudy Lozano Leadership Academy in his honor. RLLA is associated with the Instituto Del Progreso Latino in Chicago. His son, Rudy Jr, ran for State Representative in the 23rd District of Illinois in February 2010, but did not win.

Lozano's campaign manager in the 1983 election, Jesús "Chuy" García, went on to win a 1986 special election for the 22nd Ward. García ran for Mayor of Chicago in 2015, but did not win. He would ultimately be elected to the United States House of Representatives in 2018.

== See also ==
- List of homicides in Illinois

== External link ==
- Latino Urban Leaders in Chicago – Rudy Lozano photo archive
