= Jesse Sharkey =

American teacher and labor leader

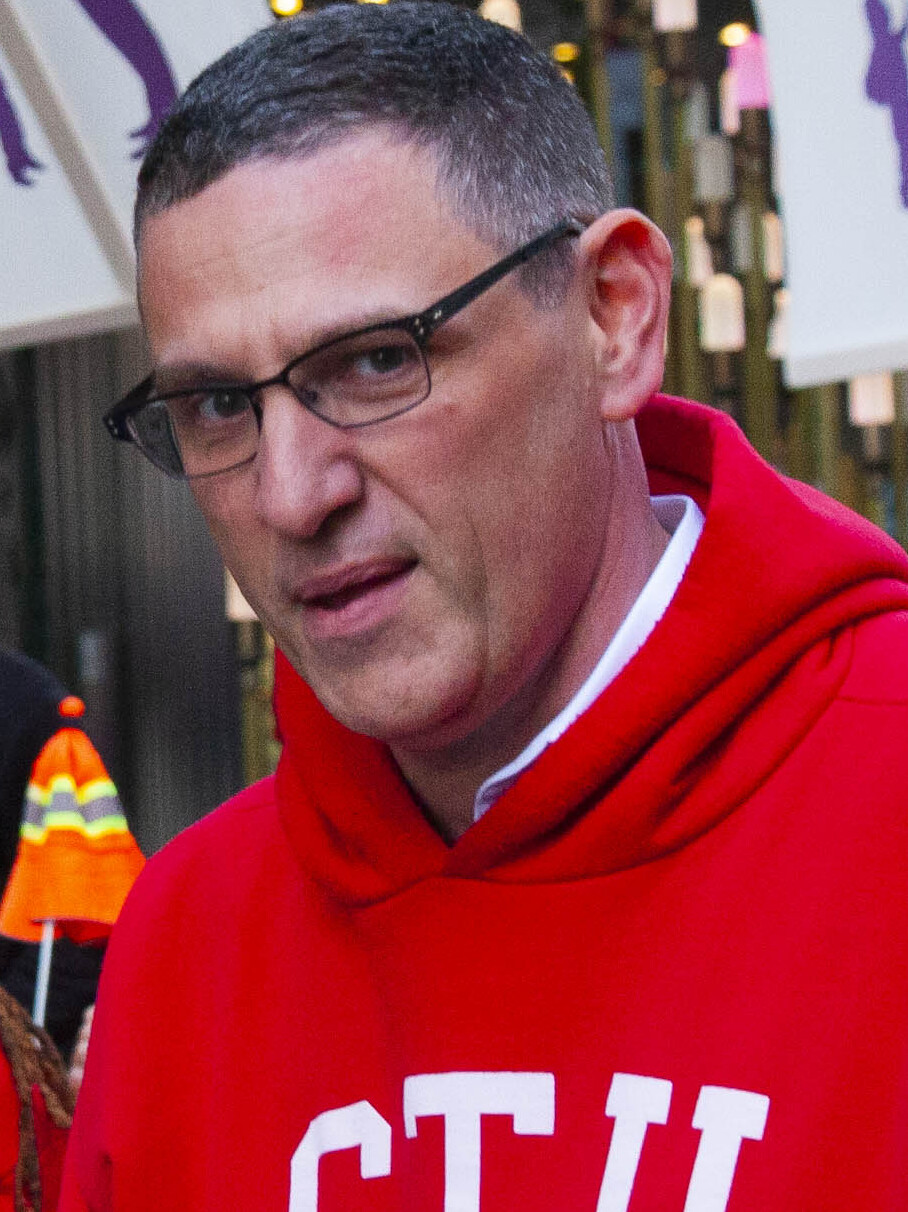
- Sharkey in 2019

President of the Chicago Teachers Union
- In office October 2014 – June 2022
- Preceded by: Karen Lewis
- Succeeded by: Stacy Davis Gates

Personal details
- Born: 1970 (age 54–55); Maine, U.S.
- Education: B.A. American History; M.A. Teaching
- Alma mater: Brown University
- Occupation: Chicago Public Schools social studies teacher, labor leader

Jesse Sharkey (born 1970) is an American former schoolteacher and labor leader in Chicago. From 2010 to 2014, he was the Vice President of the Chicago Teachers Union (CTU). In October 2014, he became acting President of the CTU after Karen Lewis stepped down as president due to illness. In May 2019, he and other members of the Caucus of Rank and File Educators (CORE) were re-elected to their leadership positions with approximately two-thirds of the vote.

Sharkey grew up in rural Maine. He was raised by his mother, who was an elementary school teacher at the local school. He won a National Merit Scholarship and attended Brown University where he majored in modern American history. After graduating, he took an organizing job with the United Steelworkers in North Carolina.

He returned to Brown and earned his Master of Arts in Teaching. He then met his wife while teaching high school social studies in the Providence Public School District. The two moved to Chicago; his wife was an associate editor of the progressive magazine In These Times before taking a job with left-wing publisher Haymarket Books.

Sharkey taught at Chicago Vocational Career Academy (CVCA). During his first year of teaching, he suffered a brain hemorrhage at school and was taken to the hospital. After a 12-hour surgery, he eventually recovered to near full strength and returned to the classroom. After three years at CVCA, he transferred to Senn High School. In 2004, Sharkey became actively involved with the Chicago Teachers Union when his school was slated to become a military academy.

Sharkey was a member of the International Socialist Organization (ISO) prior to its dissolution.

On February 2, 2022, Sharkey announced that he would not seek re-election as president of the Chicago Teachers Union and that he planned to return to the classroom after his term as president would end in June 2022. Sharkey backed the union's then-vice president Stacy Davis Gates to succeed him as president.
