= Karen Lewis =

American labor leader (1953–2021)

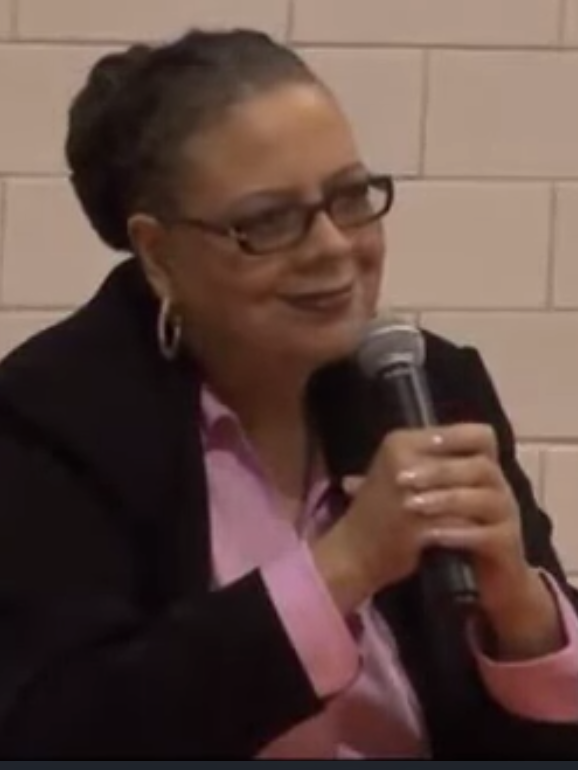
- Lewis in 2015

President of the Chicago Teachers Union
- In office 2010–2014
- Preceded by: Marilyn Stewart
- Succeeded by: Jesse Sharkey

Personal details
- Born: Karen Jennings; July 20, 1953 Chicago, Illinois, U.S.
- Died: February 7, 2021 (aged 67) Chicago, Illinois, U.S.
- Spouses: Arnold Glenn (divorced); John Lewis (m. 2001)
- Education: Mount Holyoke College (attended); Dartmouth College (BA); Northeastern Illinois University (MA)

Karen Lewis (née Jennings; July 20, 1953 – February 7, 2021) was an American educator and labor leader who served as president of the Chicago Teachers Union (CTU), Chicago's division of the American Federation of Teachers, from 2010 to 2014. For nearly 20 years before becoming president of the teachers union, she was a high school chemistry teacher.

== Early life ==
Karen Jennings was born on July 20, 1953, in Chicago's South Side to a family of teachers. She attended Kenwood High School, but left after her junior year to attend Mount Holyoke College. Lewis said Mount Holyoke "taught [her] you can do anything [...] to use your mind well [...] to express yourself." She transferred to Dartmouth College in 1972, when Dartmouth became the last Ivy League institution to become co-educational, and was the only African-American woman in the class of 1974. However, she said at Dartmouth "it was clear that women weren't wanted" and called the university "a really bad experience for me, but it made me stronger." She graduated with a degree in sociology and music. After graduation, she married Arnold Glenn and moved to Oklahoma; the couple later divorced. She then earned a Master of Arts degree in inner city studies from Northeastern Illinois University.

== Career ==
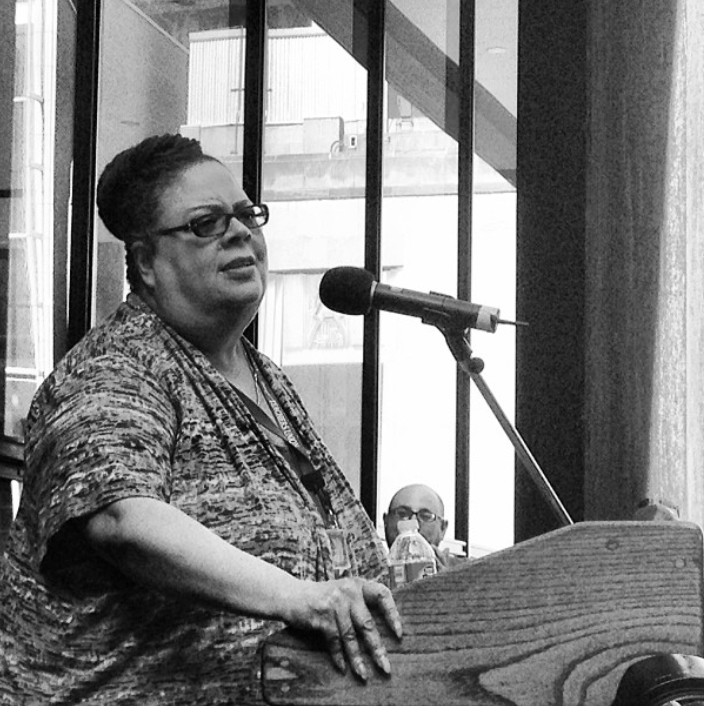
Lewis speaking at Daley Plaza during the 2013 protest of Chicago school closings

For nearly 20 years, she worked as a chemistry teacher, beginning as a substitute before being hired full-time at Sullivan High School. She later worked for Lane Tech College Prep High School and King College Prep, and said she "measured my success as a teacher by the hugs at the end of the year, by the conversations with kids who say, 'I never thought of it that way.'" In 2001, she married John Lewis, also a Chicago teacher, and the couple lived together in Bronzeville.

She became a member of the Chicago Teachers Union in 1988. Initially, she disliked the union, with her impression being that "they don't want to do any better." Lewis said the incident which inspired her to take an active role with the union happened when she was serving on a school council and saw a school principal using the position to profit his friends. In 2010, Lewis, running with the Caucus of Rank and File Educators (CORE), gained control over the CTU by winning 60 percent of the vote in a run-off election. CORE ran an aggressive grassroots organizing campaign and took a strong stance against school privatization. CORE accused the incumbent United Progressive Caucus (UPC) of capitulating to corporate interests, silencing dissent within the union, and collaborating with the city to prevent union outreach at schools. CORE quickly took action to distinguish itself from UPC, reaffirm its grassroots support, and launch a campaign to defend public education. The new leadership cut pay for union officers and used the savings to expand outreach. CORE represented a major bloc of dissent at the 2012 AFT convention, and held signs in protest of Race to the Top during a speech from Vice President Joe Biden.

=== 2012 strike ===
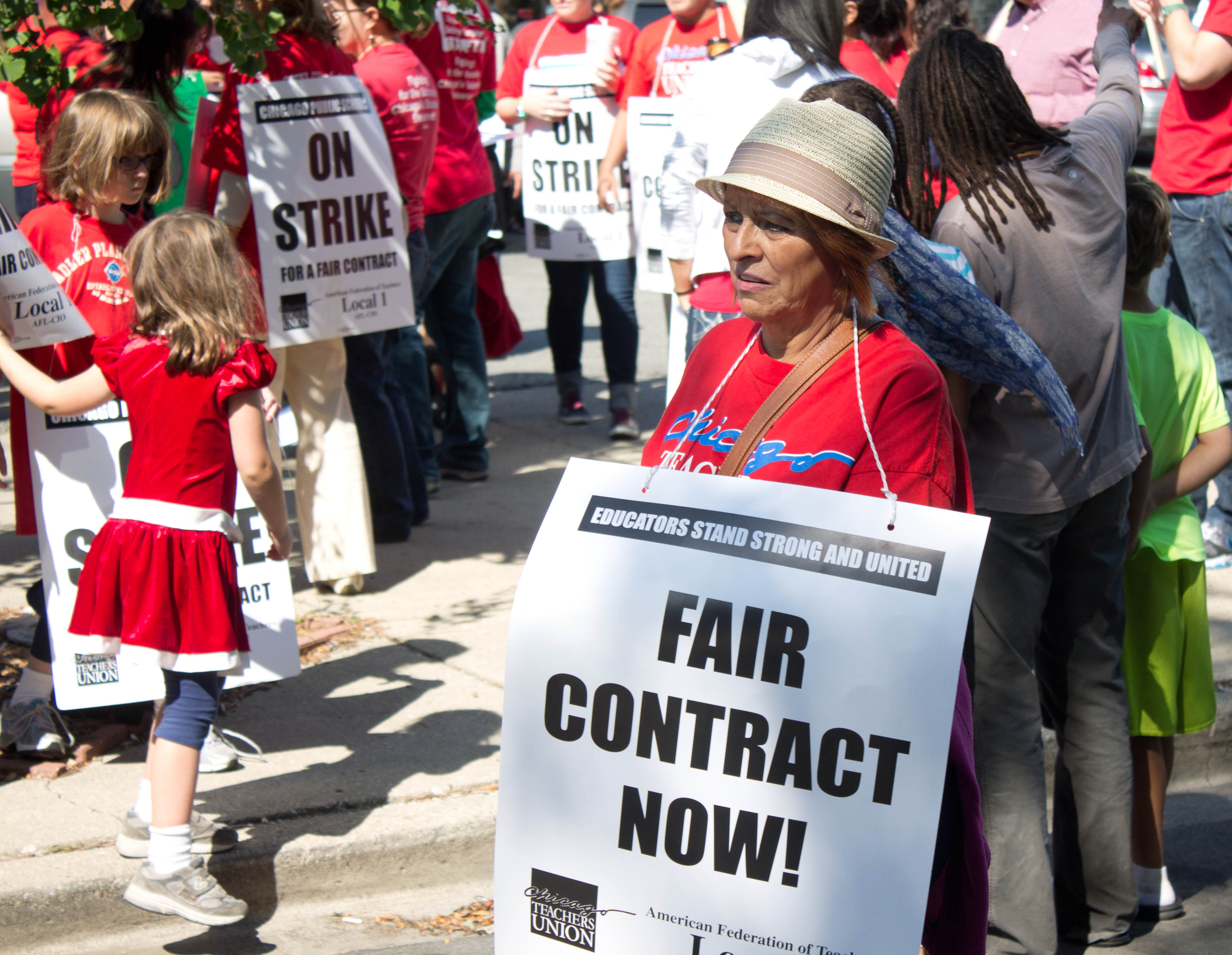
CTU strikers in 2012

Several Chicago teachers became disgruntled with the local government in 2012, and said that incumbent Mayor of Chicago Rahm Emanuel, who had been elected a year prior, had failed to deliver a four percent pay raise promised by the city. In early September 2012, Lewis led the CTU on a seven-day strike, which was the first Chicago public school teacher strike in 25 years. Emerging victorious, the union softened the proposed teacher evaluation system, prevented the instituting of merit pay, and ensured protections for veteran teachers in phased out schools. Lewis was re-elected as CTU president for a second three-year term in 2013, and a similar but smaller walkout occurred in 2016.

=== Potential 2015 mayoral candidacy ===
In July 2014, Lewis set up an exploratory committee to consider running for Mayor of Chicago in 2015. In a poll from the same month, Lewis bested Emanuel 45–36 in a hypothetical electoral contest. On October 13, 2014, her exploratory committee announced that she would not run, citing health issues. Instead, Lewis supported Jesús "Chuy" García in the election.

=== Retirement ===
Lewis stepped down as CTU president in 2014 and was replaced by Jesse Sharkey. She retired from the union altogether in 2018, citing health concerns. Following her retirement, Lewis was praised by Chicago mayor Rahm Emanuel, a longtime political enemy, who nevertheless said they had "grown to admire each other as friends."

=== Awards ===
- 2002 – National Board Certified Teacher in the area of science for adolescents and young adults.
- 2015 – The Deborah W. Meier Hero in Education Award, presented by FairTest.
- 2015 – The Mary E. Smith Foundation named a scholarship after Lewis, the "Karen Lewis CTU-CPS Excellence in Science Award."

== Personal life and death ==
In 1993, Lewis, who was previously a Lutheran, converted to Judaism. She told the Chicago Jewish News in 2013 that she wore a necklace of the Star of David every day. An opera aficionado, she spoke French, Italian, and Latin, and played flute and piano.

On October 9, 2014, Lewis was hospitalized for a "serious illness". On October 13, a source confirmed that Lewis had been diagnosed with glioblastoma, a cancerous brain tumor. On February 7, 2021, Lewis died at age 67. Following her death, the CTU put out a statement saying "Karen did not just lead our movement. Karen was our movement. She bowed to no one, and gave strength to tens of thousands of Chicago Teachers Union educators who followed her lead, and who live by her principles to this day," and the union told The New York Times that she "dazzled you with her smile, yet could stare down the most powerful enemies of public education and defend our institution with a force rarely seen in organized labor." She received tributes from Emanuel, current Mayor Lori Lightfoot and U.S. Senator Bernie Sanders.

A posthumous memoir by Lewis, I Didn't Come Here to Lie, co-written by Elizabeth Todd-Breland, was released in March 2025.
