= Local School Councils =

Local School Councils for the Chicago Public School system in Chicago, US

Every Chicago public school has a Local School Council (LSC) which consists of parents, community members, teachers, and the principal of the school. Members of the council are elected except in the case of teachers, staff and student representatives, who are appointed by the Board of Education after non-binding polls are taken and conduct monthly meetings which the public can attend. Their primary responsibility is to select the school's principal, renew the principal's contract, approve the Continuous Improvement Work Plan (CIWP) and approve the school's budget for the school year. Some LSCs serve only in an advisory capacity, such as with low-performing schools undergoing turnarounds.

== History ==
The Chicago School Reform Act of 1988 created local school councils for all Chicago public schools. The newly-formed councils consisted of the principal, two teachers, six parents, two community members, and a student representative on high school councils. The push for reform came from two sources. First, in September 1987, the Chicago Teachers Union went on strike for nineteen days. Second, in November 1987, William Bennett, President Reagan's Secretary of Education, stated that Chicago public schools were the worst in the nation.

The Reform Act was a product of grass roots work to improve Chicago public schools through decentralization. The Chicago School Reform Act was a state law directed only at changing the Chicago schools, which exercised much less local control than other school systems in the state. Many complained that the bureaucratic organization of the school system did not allow for parental or community input. The Reform Act put strong faith in the ability of parents, community members, and educators to govern their children's school. The Reform Act also ended principal tenure which had allowed principals to stay in their position for life. Principals were selected by the LSCs and were given four year contracts, after which they had to reapply. Members of LSCs were also given significant control over their school's use of funds by shaping and approving the budget. Curricular changes were also under the control of the councils, as they implemented the School Improvement Plans.

Since the Reform Act, the Chicago schools have gone through more changes and reforms, but the basic structure of the local school councils are still in place. The 1995 Chicago School Reform Act gave the mayor of Chicago more control over the schools and the ability to appoint a five-member board of trustees and chief executive officer. The board of trustees was given the power to intervene in low-performing schools, which some critics felt took power away from the local school councils. Also, the CEO implemented citywide curriculum standards which took some policy control away from the school. The local school council still retains the ability to hire principals, but the principal is increasingly responsible to the district authority and an LSCs' decision to renew or not to renew the principals' contract can be challenged before an independent arbitration officer. Nevertheless, with most of the school-level authority left intact, Chicago remains the most decentralized big-city educational system in the nation.

== Election process ==
Everyone over the age of 18 may vote at all schools where they are eligible. Parents may vote at schools in their area and any school where they have a child in attendance. Voters do not need to be citizens and are eligible at the elementary and high school in their area. Voters can vote for any combination of community and parent representatives, but may only vote for five candidates.

Parents of students are eligible to run for parent representative on the LSC. Parents must pass a criminal background check and they cannot be employed by the Board of Education to run for representative. Parents do not need a college or high school degree nor must they be a legal resident of the United States to run. All that is required of parents is an interest and willingness to participate in their child's education.

Community representatives must live in the attendance area or voting district of that school, and do not have a child currently enrolled in that school. Community representatives may not be employed by the board. Similar to the parent representatives, there are no education or citizenship requirements.

A teacher representative must be employed and assigned in a teaching position or in a position for which qualifications as a teacher are required, and employed to perform the majority of their employment duties at the school. Although principals are automatically a member of their school's LSC, assistant principals are not eligible to serve on an LSC.

In high schools, students elect their own representative. Students must be a full-time high school student to run for representative. Students serve one year terms, rather than two.

After election, all new LSC members are required to complete an 18-hour training program within six months of taking office.

== LSC members ==
All parent and community members of local school councils are elected at their school. Teachers are polled in a non-binding poll to fill 2 teacher positions and 1 staff position on the LSC. teachers and the staffer position are appointed by the Board of Education. Every member is elected to fill a two-year term and vacancies are filled through council appointments. Nearly 17,000 candidates ran for local school council in 1989, but numbers have decreased over the years despite major recruitment campaigns for parents and community members. In 2000, there were approximately 5,500 LSC seats and about 7,000 candidates, causing many candidates to go unchallenged. LSC elections occur every two years on the same day as spring report card pick up.

According to the Designs for Change report, “Chicago’s Local School Councils: What the Research Says,” LSC members are significantly better educated than the average American. 63% of LSC members hold a bachelor's degree or have completed some college compared to only 48% of Americans and 41% of Chicagoans. Only 13% of LSC members did not receive a high school diploma compared to 18% of Americans and 34% of Chicagoans.

LSC members also closely mirror the racial and ethnic make-up of the city of Chicago, although reflect the make-up of the school system less accurately. The Chicago population is 38% African American, 20% Latino, and 38% White. 55% of Chicago public school students are African American, but only 42% of parent and community representatives are African American. 31% of students are Latino, but only 14% of LSC members are Latino. Only 11% of students are white, but 40% of LSC members are white, thus there are a much higher percentage of white parent and community representatives than the percentage of students.

Although there are a lower percentage of Latino and African American LSC representatives compared to the school's enrollment, Chicago's LSCs represent a major opportunity for African American and Latino leaders to serve their communities as elected officials. The African American and Latino LSC members represent the majority of elected minority officials in Illinois.

== Meeting Structure ==
Most Local School Councils meet monthly. All LSC meetings must be posted with the time, date and location of the meeting and what will be on the agenda. Most LSC meetings are open to the public; the only closed meetings are those that discuss items exempt under the Open Meetings Act such as personnel, safety and discipline issues. LSCs must provide opportunity for public comment in at least two meetings per year; most LSCs take public comments at every meeting. LSCs must also convene at least two public meetings to present annual school improvement plan and budget proposals and to report on student and school progress.

As the primary policy-making body for their schools, LSCs deal with a wide range of issues in meetings; they may discuss busing, budgets, school improvements, curriculum changes, school events, and many other areas. Many LSCs have active advisory committees which may include non-LSC members.

== LSCs record of clean government ==
Critics predicted that there would be significant corruption in Local School Councils, but advocates for the Reform Act believed that corruption would be less likely if the decision-making authority was given to parents, because their primary desire would be to improve their children's education. Plus, reformers argued that sitting on the council of a single school would be less attractive to individuals planning to engage in corrupt behavior than serving on a large board that would govern many schools. In accordance with the reformers intention, Designs for Change have found evidence that corruption on Chicago's LSC is extremely rare.

Chicago's LSCs have strict rules restricting the hiring of relatives or business associates, rules not placed on state legislators or city council members. No LSC member has been convicted of corrupt activity related to their role on the council, although 12,000 Chicagoans have served on the LSC.

== See also ==
- Education in Chicago
- History of education in Chicago
