= Helen Shiller =

Chicago politician

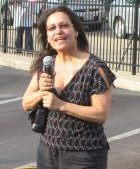

Member of the Chicago City Council from the 46th ward
- In office 1987–2011
- Preceded by: Jerome Orbach
- Succeeded by: James Cappleman

Personal details
- Born: 1947 (age 78–79) New York
- Party: Democratic
- Children: 1
- Education: University of Wisconsin–Madison
- Website: Citizens for Shiller

Helen Shiller (born 1947) is a former Alderman of the 46th ward in Chicago, Illinois. Shiller is also a published author, having written a 500-page book on her politics and activism in Chicago from 1971 to 2011. Shiller served in the Chicago City Council for six four-year terms, from 1987 to 2011. Shiller was elected to the City Council on her third attempt, as Harold Washington, Chicago's first black Mayor, was re-elected to his second term, and her election as alderman helped close the Council Wars era in Chicago government. Shiller has been described as "a reformer unafraid to take on the boys in power." A less flattering description is that she is "committed to liberal causes and destroying all within her path". Among her most significant impacts on Chicago were her advocacy for diverse, inclusive, affordable housing and helping craft Chicago's response to the HIV/AIDS crisis. Her commitment to fostering community development without displacement often brought Shiller into contention with some constituencies, real estate developers, and editorial boards. Shiller's oral history was collected by Pulitzer Prize-winning author and Uptown resident Studs Terkel in his 2003 book, Hope Dies Last. As she details in her own book, among her policy victories as a City Council member was: getting human rights legislation passed, having Chicago implement anti-apartheid legislation, creating a City Council Subcommittee on Domestic Violence, and building a unique mix-used development.

== Early life and education ==
Shiller was born in 1947 and raised on Long Island in New York, growing up in a middle-class family. Her parents were home owners. Her father, Morris Shiller, was a self-employed chemist who emigrated to the United States from Latvia. Some members of his family were Holocaust victims. Shiller's mother was Sara (née Trop), Sara was born and raised in Belarus, where she lived through various occupations, including by the Germans, Polish, Russians, and Soviet Union. Sara came to America through Ellis Island at the age of six. She became a nurse and married Morris, in 1936. She died at the age of 96 in the summer of 2011.

Helen Shiller earned her high school diploma in 1965 from Woodstock County School in Vermont, the same progressive boarding school that Pete Seeger's children attended. Shiller graduated with a degree in history from the University of Wisconsin–Madison, where she was active in the anti-Vietnam War movement and in the Students for a Democratic Society (SDS). In 2005, Shiller graduated from DePaul University's School for New Learning Master's Program, where her focus was public policy.

== Early career ==
Shiller moved to Chicago's Uptown neighborhood in 1972 with her husband Marc Zalkin and her infant son, Brendan, and lived on N Malden Street in Uptown. Shiller drove a cab, worked as a waitress and freelance photographer, and got involved in radical politics. With one of Chicago's most controversial political organizers, Walter "Slim" Coleman, Shiller helped organize the Intercommunal Survival Committee, a sort of white support arm of the Black Panther Party. The committee evolved into the Heart of Uptown Coalition, a political and social service organization steeped in the rhetoric of Marxism; "comrades" were expected to organize "cadres." "We must have the frame of mind that as revolutionaries we have (to) be able to solve any problem that comes our way ..." Shiller said. The Coalition provided an array of programs geared toward providing essential services for the poor, including medical clinics for pregnant women, mothers and young children; a legal aid clinic, food pantries and distributing clothes and meals to the poor. For decades Shiller and her allies worked to preserve Uptown as the last North Side lakefront neighborhood south of Rogers Park that is home to a significant population of low income households.

Shiller supported Michael Bakalis in his 1978 primary challenge to Illinois Governor James R. Thompson, attacking Thompson for "making deals with the Chicago machine" and for being unsympathetic to the urban poor. Shiller helped open an extension of Shimer College at 4833 N Broadway in the Fall of 1978. Shiller took on Illinois' dentists when in 1978 the Uptown Peoples Community Services Center joined consumers groups in a federal lawsuit which attempted to break up dentists' monopoly on fitting dentures. From 1981 to 1987, Shiller was president and CEO of Justice Graphics, Inc. a print shop, a small business of which Shiller and Coleman were two of five owners.

In 2003 Shiller recalled the period:

I was as student in the sixties, engaged in the civil rights movement, anti-Vietnam War protests. I'd come from New York to attend the University of Wisconsin. It was an exciting time. A lot of active students wound up in different cities and communities as organizers. I chose Racine, Wisconsin. I spent three years there. We had developed a legal clinic and we had a whole health program, but the city was too small. I had, of course, heard about Uptown in Chicago, and the challenges. So I wound up here in 1976. I waited tables. I did photography, took pictures for attorneys. Ultimately we started our own print shop in order to print our own newspapers and magazines.

== Campaigns for alderman ==
=== First campaign for alderman (1978) ===
A special election was called for May 16, 1978 in the 46th Ward when Alderman Chris Cohen, first elected in 1971, was re-elected in 1975 but retired in mid-term to head the Chicago regional office of the United States Department of Health, Education, and Welfare. On March 6, 1978, Ralph Axelrod, chief administrative assistant to Cook County Sheriff Richard Elrod, and ward committeeman since 1973, slated himself for alderman.

At the time, Shiller was 30 years old and the editor of Keep Strong, a leftist magazine. Shiller's first attempt at elected office was to join a multi-way challenge to Axelrod. "I ran for alderman of this [46th] ward in 1978. I was terrified. I was very shy, afraid to speak to more than five people at a time," Shiller recalled in 2003. Shiller picked up much of the support that Young Lords founder and leader Jose Cha Cha Jimenez had in Jimenez' unsuccessful challenge to Cohen in the 1975 elections. He was running primarily as a defence against the FBI's CointelPro repressive program and to expose the displacement of Latino and lower income areas from the lakefront and near downtown by the Richard J. Daley machine. He still received 39% of the vote coming in second in a three-way race. Shiller's base of support was the same geographic center of the ward, an area of high density, low-income families between Broadway and Clark Street. Shiller campaigned pledging to work to keep the disadvantaged of Uptown from being displaced by gentrification.

Independents including Aldermen Dick Simpson (44th), Martin J. Oberman (43rd), and Ross Lathrop (5th), and former alderman and mayoral candidate William Singer (43rd), endorsed Angela Turley, founder of the Organization of the Northeast (ONE), a community group. Turley was also unanimously endorsed by the 46th Ward Citizens Search Committee, a group of 50 ward residents who interviewed 10 candidates. Turley and another candidate Carl Lezak, a former priest and former director of the American Civil Liberties Union (ACLU), were challenged and stricken from the ballot by the Chicago Board of Elections Commissioners, leaving a three-way race for alderman between Axelrod, Shiller, and former television news reporter Michael Horowitz. Shiller charged that the regular Democratic organization used unfair campaign practices against her, challenging about 100 of the 400 new voters she helped register, stealing her campaign posters, and pressuring store owners to remove her signs. The Chicago Tribune endorsed Axelrod, noting Shiller "runs primarily as a champion of the poor." Axelrod prevailed, receiving 5,575 votes, or 54.5%, to Shiller's 3,475 votes.

=== Second campaign for alderman (1979) ===
Shiller and Turley challenged Axelrod in 1979. An extra alarm fire early on Friday, February 9, 1979, weeks before the election, caused extensive damage to the building containing Shiller's campaign headquarters and left 15 homeless. The Chicago Tribune endorsed Axelrod. Shiller (6,852 votes; 46%) bested Axelrod (6,088 votes; 40%), but, as no candidate received a majority of the vote in the three-way race, a run-off was forced. The Chicago Tribune and Turley endorsed Axelrod in the run-off. The Chicago Tribune wrote that "Ms. Shiller's program shares many elements with that of the Black Panthers and appears to be based on hopes of an eventual "revolution" [not defined]." Turley described Axelrod as "the lesser of two evils in the race now." Axelrod enlisted 40 volunteer attorneys and 200 off-duty policemen to challenge ghost voting in a project he called "Operation Safeguard." Axelrod challenged 1,060 voter registrations on the ward's rolls, 931 of which were upheld by the Chicago Board of Elections Commissioners. Axelrod defeated Shiller in the run-off by 247 votes. Shiller later recalled the campaign:

I won the primary, but not with fifty-one percent of the vote. We had a runoff and I lost by two hundred votes – to a machine candidate. We were bringing fresh ideas, but we were not experienced in fighting the machine on election day. I swore I'd never run for alderman again. There was so much racial baiting that it was terrifying. I was called names. ... My posters had black paint all over them with racial epithets. It was very disturbing.

=== Third campaign for alderman (1987) ===
In Harold Washington's successful first campaign for Mayor of Chicago in the 1983 municipal elections, Shiller was employed as the campaign organizer for the 46th Ward. Shiller owned and operated a print shop, Justice Graphics, that printed the campaign literature for Washington's first mayoral campaign. Justice Graphics published the All-Chicago City News, a 40,000 circulation pro-Washington, left-wing, bilingual, biweekly newspaper edited by Shiller and Walter "Slim" Coleman. Coleman formed a plan to register 100,000 new voters for Washington by canvassing public aid offices and became a close advisor to candidate and, later, Mayor Harold Washington. Just before the 1983 elections, Alderman Axelrod resigned from City Council to take a job in the Cook County Sheriff's office. Community activist Charlotte Newfeld and Jerome Orbach ran for alderman and went to a run-off, which Orbach won by 66 votes. Orbach allied with Edward Vrdolyak and the Vrdolyak 29 during Council Wars.

"Harold was mayor, and he was harping on me to run for alderman," Shiller recalled in 2003. In 1987, Shiller, Nancy Kaszak, and Gerald Pechenuk challenged Orbach. Kaszak was a lawyer, a former vice president of the Chicago Council of Lawyers, a Mayor Harold Washington appointee to the Commission on Chicago Landmarks, a leader of the Lakeview Citizens' Council, and president of Citizens United for Baseball in Sunshine (CUBS), which opposed night baseball at Wrigley Field. Newfeld co-chaired Kaszak's campaign. Pechenuk was a consultant for Lyndon LaRouche Jr. for 12 years, and was treasurer of LaRouche-supported Sheila Jones's mayoral campaign. Shiller challenged Pechenuk's nominating petitions.

Mayor Washington endorsed 18 incumbent aldermen and 5 challengers, including Shiller. Washington appeared at a joint rally with Shiller at which she announced her candidacy. Kaszak was endorsed by the Chicago Sun-Times, the Independent Voters of Illinois-Independent Precinct Organization (IVI-IPO), the National Organization for Women (NOW), the American Federation of State, County and Municipal Employees (AFSCME), and former aldermen William Singer and Dick Simpson. The Chicago Tribune endorsed Orbach. Shiller charged that Orbach catered to developers, displacing people in the wake of rehabilitation that priced housing out of the reach of many, and said she wanted community zoning boards, with their decisions binding on the alderman. Shiller charged that most of Orbach's campaign war chest was from developers and regular Democrats outside the ward.

In the four-way race, Orbach took 40% of the vote and Shiller 38%, but, no candidate received a majority, resulting in a run-off. Kaszak endorsed Shiller, although many of Kaszak's followers supported Orbach. Orbach tried to position himself on both sides of the pro-/anti-Washington political fence, and late in the campaign attempted to stage a public conversion to pro-Washington positions. Some prominent independents, such as Alderman Marion Volini (48th), state Representative Ellis B. Levin and state Senator William A. Marovitz, endorsed Orbach, as did the Chicago Sun-Times and Chicago Tribune. "His [Orbach's] relationship to large real estate developers is very important. He's become more of an advocate for people outside of the ward than for people here," Shiller charged. Some of Orbach's allies spread a rumor, aimed at lakefront Jewish voters, that as alderman Shiller would support a Palestinian state. Shiller's forces called Orbach a racist, although a large number of blacks backed Orbach in his early campaigns. Shiller later said,

The machine alderman who won in 1983 [Orbach] had a chief of staff who was engaging in racial organizing. There were white gangs up here. One of them he helped organize into a consciously racially white-power gang. They hooked up with both the Klan and the Nazi Party.

In the months leading up to the election, the Heart of Uptown Coalition and a Shiller supporter who was director of the Center for Street People, 4455 N. Broadway, organized a voter registration drive that registered 80 homeless people using the center's address, and on election day fed them a meal at a local church hall and helped them vote. Jesus People USA, a 500-member commune/business/charity/religious group with many members living in the ward, had supported Orbach throughout his career, but switched to Shiller before the run-off. Jesus People's spokesman explained "We think Jerry Orbach is a lovely man, but he doesn't have what it takes to stand up to the development ... If things keep going there will be massive displacement. People will be thrown out of their homes. We decided that Helen Shiller would do the most to prevent displacement." Orbach supporters charged that a City official had offered City contracts to the Jesus People's construction firm if Shiller were elected. On Tuesday, April 7, 1987, Shiller defeated Orbach by 498 votes, 9,751 to 9,253, and contributed to a narrow, pro-Washington, reform-minded majority in the City Council which helped draw the Council Wars era to close.

== Aldermanic career ==
In her six terms as alderman, Shiller served on eight committees: Budget and Government Operations; Buildings; Committees, Rules and Ethics; Finance; Health; Housing and Real Estate; Human Relations; and License and Consumer Protection.

=== First term (1987–1991) ===
On December 16, 1987, Shiller was among the supporters of the 1988 City budget, proposed by Washington in late 1987 and passed 29-19 under Mayor Eugene Sawyer after Washington's death in office. Shiller was among opponents of Sawyer's 1989 budget, approved 34–13 on December 7, 1988. In January, 1988, Shiller was named one of "88 People to Watch" by Chicago Tribune staff. Shiller was Mayor Richard M. Daley's staunchest opponent in City Council votes in the last three months of 1989, in Daley's first year of his first term.

In 1989, Shiller sponsored a resolution creating a sub-committee on Domestic Violence. Shiller backed a group of 50 to 75 people including more than 40 homeless people and six children who erected a "tent city" from doors and wood on a vacant lot at 4425 N. Malden to illustrate the plight of the homeless. On Friday, October 14, 1989, Shiller was among five arrested when police, called by the owner, evicted about 100 protesters from the lot. Shiller was charged with trespassing and spent "about two minutes" in jail before charges were dropped.

==== Uptown Chicago Commission funding ====
In November, 1987, Shiller's first budget cycle, she recommended to the Budget Committee that the City cancel a federal grant for the Uptown Chicago Commission (UCC), a 32-year-old community group in Uptown that often contended on issues with the Heart of Uptown Coalition, of which Shiller was co-chairman with Walter "Slim" Coleman. The recommendation came during Budget Committee hearings on the distribution of $95.1 million in federal Community Development Block Grants. Mayor Washington's budget recommendation included a $20,000 grant to UCC to facilitate residents applying for home improvement loans. The UCC's service area included the adjoining 48th Ward, whose Alderman Kathy Osterman also supported the funding. Shiller requested that the committee deny the UCC its grant. Shiller accused the UCC of helping developers displace low-income Uptown residents. After heated debate, the Budget Committee voted 9–5 in favor of Shiller's amendment to remove the grant for the UCC.

Upon the death of Mayor Washington in office, Shiller supported Alderman Timothy C. Evans for mayor, but supporters of Alderman Eugene Sawyer prevailed. Weeks later, at the first City Council meeting under Mayor Sawyer, the UCC funding was restored. Shiller said restoring the grant to the UCC would affect only the 48th Ward, not her ward. "I was not going to have them operating in the 46th," Shiller said, claiming she had reached an agreement to keep UCC services out of her ward several days before Washington's death. "Mayor Sawyer had nothing to do with this," Shiller claimed. "He had recommended no changes."

==== Low-income housing consent decree ====
As early as 1966 Uptown was among the possible sites proposed for a northeast-side commuter campus in the City Colleges of Chicago community college district. The Uptown site west of the Wilson Chicago Transit Authority (CTA) station was opposed by those concerned for the displacement of low income residents, largely blacks, southern whites and American Indians. The project was mired in heated controversy for decades. Avery v Pierce, a federal lawsuit filed in 1975, alleged that the razing of about 3,000 low-income housing units for the development of Harry S Truman College constituted misspending of funds by the City and Chicago Housing Authority. Plaintiffs were represented by Shiller's former campaign manager, attorney James P. Chapman of the Uptown Peoples Law Center.

In 1985 Randall H. Langer, a young real estate developer active in apartment rehabilitation in the neighborhood, aided the creation of a local historic district, the Sheridan Park Historic District, which critics charged was of dubious historical value and created to facilitate gentrification. Nineteen tax delinquent properties in Uptown were offered for sale by auction by Cook County in Fall, 1987. Since 1983 Cook County had a program to afford local governments the opportunity to acquire tax delinquent properties for almost nothing, prior to the county's scavenger sale to the public, if the local government had a specific development plan. On October 28, 1987, Shiller urged the Tax Delinquency Subcommittee of the Cook County Board to accept a no-cash bid from the city for the 19 tax-delinquent parcels in Uptown. A decision was deferred when Commissioner Rosemarie Love requested a delay on grounds that the Washington administration had not provided a development plan. Subcommittee chairman Commissioner Richard Siebel said the county's no-cash sales program was "designed to place property back on the tax rolls as quickly as possible – not for land-banking. It's not appropriate for us to pass this until the city tells us, parcel by parcel, what they intend to do and how they plan to pay for it." Another commissioner noted that the City already owned 7,000 tax-delinquent properties, and another added, "Properties we gave to the city 12 years ago are still war zones. I don't want the same thing to happen here."

As a bench ruling in Avery v Pierce neared, Shiller proposed an ordinance that directed the city to settle and accept a consent decree. The consent decree would have put most vacant parcels in Uptown into a land bank for future affordable housing, administered by a community development corporation, funded by the city with $100,000 over two years. The consent decree also would have made a "desirable" goal of 3,000 low-income housing units in Uptown. On November 16, 1987, the Committee on Finance of the Chicago City Council, chaired at the time by Shiller ally Alderman Timothy Evans, voted 21 to 2 to recommend the consent decree. Shiller gloated during committee hearings that, with Mayor Harold Washington's backing, the decree could not be stopped. Pulitzer Prize-winning commentator Mike Royko wrote in the Chicago Tribune:

One of the most depressing sections of Chicago is the Uptown area on the North Side. Shabby apartment buildings, vacant stores, wino bars, littered vacant lots, junkies, muggers, and career down-and-outers. It also has a new alderman, Helen Shiller, and she has a vision of what that seedy old neighborhood should be in the future. And apparently her vision is that Uptown should remain a seedy old neighborhood.

In 1988 Royko wrote of Shiller, "her main motive was that she was building a political power base, which included as many winos as she and Coleman could drag to the voting booth." Shiller's proposal was criticized in a series of editorials. The Chicago Tribune called the proposal "silly," editorializing:

It would have enabled her [Shiller] to strangle commercial development in her Uptown ward and keep it poor. ... It was a flagrantly bad idea and deserved its defeat. It would have put Helen Shiller and her sidekick, Slim Coleman, in charge of a "community development corporation" whose avowed purpose would be to block private investment in the 46th Ward and use all available space for low-cost housing. This would consolidate their own power by ensuring a constituency of poor and dependent voters.

In 2003 Shiller explained the editorials:

When I first became alderman, there was a developer up here who felt very threatened by me. He hired a publicist to really go after me. Any time I talked about development without displacement, they would ream me. They went to the press and got some of the most vicious editorials published.

On December 3, 1987, 16 of the parcels were sold to private bidders at Cook County's annual scavenger sale, and Langer and partnerships Langer controlled bought 13 of the parcels. On December 9, 1987, at the first regular business meeting of the City Council after the death of Mayor Washington in office, Washington foes brought the proposal out of committee. Alderman Bernard Stone joined Alderman Osterman in blocking the agreement, saying Shiller's "arrogance prevailed and that arrogance has to be answered on this floor." The Council rejected the consent decree 29–17.

=== Second term (1991–1995) ===
In 1991, Shiller supported Danny K. Davis in Davis' unsuccessful primary challenge to Daley. Daley endorsed Shiller's challenger, Michael Quigley, campaigned with Quigley and sent letters in support of Quigley. Shiller finished seven votes ahead of Quigley, but a third candidate got 3.4% of the vote, which forced a runoff, the third straight run-off for Shiller and the fourth straight for the 46th ward. In the run-off, Shiller won with 53% of the vote, amid charges that Quigley was a carpetbagger.

Shiller added a budget amendment to triple the city's AIDS budget in 1992. Shiller was one of nine alderman voting against Daley's 1993 budget, which included a $28.7 million property tax increase. Shiller was absent for the 1994 budget vote, and was one of four aldermen dissenting on Daley's 1995 budget.

=== Third term (1995–1999) ===
The Chicago Tribune was among newspapers that endorsed Shiller for re-election in 1995, and she won with 57% of the vote, without a run-off. Shiller supported U.S. Representative Bobby Rush in his unsuccessful challenge to Daley in 1999.

"Arguably, the single most important legislative responsibility that aldermen have is voting on the city budget each year," Shiller said. She was the lone dissenting vote on Daley's 1996, 1997 and 1998 budgets. During hearings on Daley's 1996 budget, which included a $19.5 million property-tax increase, she submitted 123 questions on the budget in writing to department heads, but only 35 were answered. She objected to the tax increase in a period of several years of budget surpluses. She attended every hearing on Daley's 1997 budget armed with policy questions that she said went unanswered. She was often the only alderman present at budget hearings.

=== Fourth term (1999–2003) ===
In 1999, Sandra Reed, a black high school English teacher, and two other women opposed Shiller, the first all-female field in an aldermanic race in Chicago history. The Chicago Tribune again endorsed Shiller. Shiller prevailed with 55% of the vote in a runoff. Shiller was inducted into the Chicago Gay and Lesbian Hall of Fame as a Friend of the Community in 2000.

On November 17, 1999, Shiller joined in unanimous support for Daley's 2000 budget, her first affirmative vote on a Daley budget and only her second affirmative vote on a City budget. Aldermen applauded. Shiller again joined in unanimous support for Daley's 2001, 2002, and 2003 budgets. In the 2001 redistricting of Chicago wards, Daley tried to deprive Shiller of her most committed supporters, but failed when none of the aldermen in adjacent wards wanted to contend with Shiller's supporters. Shiller and Daley, however, reached an understanding: the mayor supported her in the 2003 elections and also pushed forward development of Wilson Yard, a Chicago Transit Authority facility destroyed by fire, into affordable housing and a Target store, using the Wilson Yard Tax Increment Financing District and the $26.5 million it generated. Subsequently, Shiller consistently voted in support of the mayor's agenda.

=== Fifth term (2003–2007) ===
Shiller and Daley supported each other for re-election in 2003. Shiller cited Daley's commitment to affordable housing, and in particular his Planning Department's work on the Wilson Yard project. Columnist Mark Brown wrote in the Chicago Sun-Times,

The last squeaky wheel in the City Council had been greased. The last independent voice had joined the chorus ... Shiller's endorsement of Daley is all the more amazing when you look at where she started, about as close to a Marxist as you'd ever find at City Hall.

Shiller defeated Reed again in 2003, this time with 58% of the vote. Shiller again joined in unanimous support for Daley's 2004 budget. Shiller was the only alderman who did not cast a vote on the passage of the Big Box Ordinance, which required large retailers to pay a living wage. Target sent a letter to Mayor Daley and alderman indicating that if the ordinance were not overturned, they would not proceed on projects in Chicago. Shiller voted to sustain Daley's veto.

=== Sixth term (2007–2011) ===
Criticism of Shiller in the 2007 election largely focused on the lack of communication with ward residents, failure to obtain input from residents for zoning changes in the ward, her lack of involvement in community policing meetings, and the many years of blighted retail in the ward. Some critics charged that Shiller was frustrating developers while using the Wilson Yard project to maintain her political base. In 2007, Shiller defeated social worker James Cappleman with 53% of the vote. In October, 2007, Shiller became chair of the City Council's Human Relations Committee. In 2009, Shiller was criticized by Uptown residents for her perceived lack of engagement in addressing crime in the neighborhood, including a string of violent robberies in nearby Lakeview that attracted the attention of the Chicago Tribune, Chicago Sun-Times, and local TV news. Police interviewed said interventions from Shiller and her staff facilitated the protection of gang members from policing activity, allegedly for gaining voter base, according to a report in Chicago Magazine.

Mayor Daley was among supporters of the Wilson Yard redevelopment project celebrating the completion of construction on July 20, 2010. The project included 98 units of subsidized housing for low-income residents in two buildings, one for seniors, and another for other families. The Target store opened on Sunday, July 22, 2010. On August 2, 2010, Shiller announced she would not run for re-election in 2011. Shiller reflected,

... we should be able to make sure that everyone has a place in the city, and when we do development ... we should make sure that the people who are here today will be here when that is complete ... my most singular perspective was to prove that that is possible. ... we have to have a city that is not just inclusive about our diversity but is serious and honest about making sure that everyone has a place here ...

On closing her ward office, Shiller wrote:

I am most proud of my achievements in tripling the City's funding budget for HIV/AIDS victims and for developing the toughest stance on Apartheid that was ever written in the 90's, for my work on domestic violence issues and establishing 24-hour daycare for children, the Ruth Shriman House for senior living, the Wilson Yards Development and for welcoming Target as a neighbor and partner, and of course setting the bar for affordable housing in Chicago.

== Retirement and the Westside Justice Center ==
Shiller retired from politics in 2010 after her sixth term as alderman. In 2014, her son Brendan, a defense attorney, found a few empty buildings on Chicago's west side and laid out a vision to his mother that included setting up shop for his law firm, Shiller and Preyar. Shiller used her years of experience in government work and community advocacy to create the Westside Justice Center which officially opened in 2015. By 2017, the Westside Justice Center became home to two law firms, several sole practitioners, three non-profits, and a cafe. The main non-profit, also called the Westside Justice Center helps to connect low-income communities to social services with the help of the center's legal team.

== Personal life ==
Shiller separated from her husband Mark Zalkin, one of Mayor Harold Washington's assistant press secretaries, and with Shiller a leader of the 46th Ward Community Service Center (later the Uptown Community Service Center) and an editor of Keep Strong magazine, and with Shiller and Coleman an editor of All-Chicago City News. Zalkin died on February 23, 1998, at age 49 due to complications from multiple sclerosis.

Shiller and Zalkin have one son, Brendan Shiller. Brendan attended Joseph Stockton Elementary School, a Chicago Public School, and Whitney Young Magnet High School, a selective-enrollment public magnet high school in Chicago's Near West Side. While attending Truman College, Brendan was managing editor of All-Chicago City News. After Truman, Brendan went to Howard University in Washington, D.C. For two years starting in February, 1997 Brendan edited StreetWise, a street newspaper sold by people without homes or those at-risk for homelessness in Chicago. In 2003, Brendan graduated first in his class from John Marshall Law School and currently works as a lawyer representing criminal defendants and police misconduct plaintiffs. One of Shiller's granddaughters is the published poet Britteney Black Rose Kapri. Shiller is now a professional poker player.

Helen Shiller and her long-time staff member Maggie Marystone were interviewed in separate chapters in Hope Dies Last, a collection of oral histories by Pulitzer Prize-winning author and Uptown resident Studs Terkel.

== Publications ==
- Shiller, Helen (1988-04-11). "Chicago Housing: 'Let The Market Decide' Hasn't Worked". Chicago Tribune.
- Shiller, Helen (2022), Daring To Struggle, Daring to Win
