= Chicago Board of Education =

School board in Illinois, United States

- Established: 1837 (as "Chicago Board of School Inspectors")
- Type: Board of education
- President: Sean Harden
- Vice-president: Angel Velez
- Website: https://www.cpsboe.org/

The Chicago Board of Education serves as the board of education (school board) for the Chicago Public Schools.

The board traces its origins to the Board of School Inspectors, created in 1837.

The board is currently made up of 11 members appointed by the mayor of Chicago and 10 members elected during the 2024 Chicago Board of Education election. By 2027, the board is slated to transition to consist entirely of elected members.

== History ==
=== Board of School Inspectors (1837–1857) ===
On May 12, 1837, the Chicago Common Council (as the Chicago City Council was called at the time) used their powers as ex-officio commissioners of schools to appoint the first Board of School Inspectors, the city's school board. Despite the existence of this board, the Common Council however had ultimate power of acting as the de facto school board in the early decades under 1839 legislation. The Common Council initially held the authority to the members of the Board of School Inspectors. Ultimately, the mayor would gain the power to appoint the members with city council approval.

In 1855, the authority to remove the superintendent of Chicago Public Schools was given to the Board of School Inspectors by the same ordinance which created the city's first high school.

=== Board of education ===
In 1857, the school board was renamed the Chicago Board of Education under the passage of a new school charter by the Illinois General Assembly, which also increased its membership from seven to fifteen and gave the mayor of Chicago authority to appoint board members.

In a charter passed by the Illinois General Assembly on February 13, 1863, the Chicago Board of Education was granted exclusive power over operating the city's schools. Greater administrative control was given to the board in 1865, when the General Assembly amended the 1863 charter, including moving control over the school fund, which had previously belonged to the Common Council

The Cities and Villages Act of 1872 made further clear the relationship between the roles of the Common Council and the Chicago Board of Education, strengthening the power of the Chicago Board of Education.

The board expanded ultimately to 21 members, before being reduced by the 1917 Otis Bill to eleven members. The term of office was increased by the Otis bill from three years to five.

In 1988, the state government enacted the Chicago School Reform Act, which expanded the Chicago Board of Education's size to fifteen seats. The Act also created a School Board Nominating Commission consisting of 23 parents and community members and five members appointed by the Mayor of Chicago who would recommend nominees to the Mayor.

In 1995, the state government enacted the Chicago School Reform Amendatory Act, which returned the power to appoint members of the board back to the Mayor of Chicago. The Act also temporarily retitled the board as the "Reform Board of Trustees" from 1995 until July 1, 1999, after which period the name "Chicago Board of Education" was restored.

==== Elected school board (2025 onwards) ====
On July 29, 2021, governor J. B. Pritzker signed into law HB 2908, legislation that will make it so that, by 2027, the Board of Education will consist entirely of elected members. The legislation will also expand the size of the board to 21 members (including the president).

Per the legislation, in a November 2024 election, ten elected members will be elected from ten geographic districts to four-year terms that will begin in January 2025. From January 2025 through January 2027, these elected members will serve alongside 11 members (including the board's president) appointed by the mayor, subject to the approval of the Chicago City Council. With the exception of the president, each of the appointed members will hail from a different one of the ten electoral districts used for the 2024 Board of Education election. The 2024 election will be the first time in Chicago's history that the city will hold a school board election. Per the legislation, in 2026, the number of electoral districts will be increased to twenty, and an election will be held for the Board of education members from the ten new districts without incumbents. The members elected in this election will serve four-year terms beginning in January 2027. Resultantly, beginning in January 2027, each geographic district will be represented by a single elected member. Also in 2026, the board's president will be elected at-large to a four-year term. The legislation dictates that the convention of having twenty members from geographic districts plus a board president elected at-large will remain place thereafter.

The Board of education will see members from ten of its geographic districts up for election every two-years. The electoral districts that will be used for Board of Education elections will have their boundaries drawn by Illinois General Assembly. With its 21 members, Chicago's Board of Education will become the largest school board among major cities in the United States by number of members. Under the new law, newly elected members take office on January 15. If vacancies arise on the Board of Education, the remainder of the vacant seat's unexpired term will be filled by a mayoral appointee, with appointees being subject to the approval of the Chicago City Council.

== Current members ==
The incumbent members of the Chicago Board of Education are below.

District	Member	Start	Type	Next Election
At-large	Sean Harden, President	January 16, 2025	Appointed	2026
1A	Ed Bannon	January 17, 2025	Appointed	2026
1B	Jenni Custer	January 17, 2025	Elected	2028
2A	Ebony DeBerry	January 21, 2025	Elected	2028
2B	Debby Pope	January 17, 2025	Appointed	2026
3A	Norma Rios-Sierra	January 16, 2025	Appointed	2026
3B	Carlos Rivas	January 21, 2025	Elected	2028
4A	Karen Zaccor	January 17, 2025	Appointed	2026
4B	Ellen Rosenfeld	January 17, 2025	Elected	2028
5A	Jitu Brown	February 6, 2025	Elected	2028
5B	Michilla Blaise	January 21, 2025	Appointed	2026
6A	Anusha Thotakura	January 17, 2025	Appointed	2026
6B	Jessica Biggs	January 19, 2025	Elected	2028
7A	Emma Lozano	January 23, 2025	Appointed	2026
7B	Yesenia Lopez	February 3, 2025	Elected	2028
8A	Angel Gutierrez	January 16, 2025	Elected	2028
8B	Cydney Wallace	March 6, 2025	Appointed	2026
9A	Ángel Vélez, Vice President	September 2, 2025	Appointed	2026
9B	Therese Boyle	January 17, 2025	Elected	2028
10A	Che Smith	January 16, 2025	Elected	2028
10B	Connie Anderson	August 27, 2026	Appointed	2026

== President of the Chicago Board of Education ==
The Chicago Board of Education is led by a president. The current President is Sean Harden, a former Deputy CEO of Chicago Public Schools, who was appointed to the position by Mayor Brandon Johnson in December 2024.

Since the 1995 Chicago School Reform Amendatory Act went into effect, the president has been directly appointed by the mayor of Chicago, rather than being elected among the members of the board.

Beginning with the 2026 Chicago Board of Education elections, after which the Board of Education is slated to become an entirely-elected board, the president will be elected at-large.
