= Chicago Teachers Union =

US trade union

- Abbreviation: CTU
- Formation: 1937
- Type: Trade union
- Location: Chicago, Illinois, US
- Members: 28,000 (2018)
- President: Stacy Davis Gates
- Parent organization: American Federation of Teachers
- Affiliations: AFL–CIO; Chicago Federation of Labor; Illinois AFL–CIO; Illinois Federation of Teachers
- Website: ctulocal1.org

The Chicago Teachers Union (CTU) is a labor union that represents teachers and clinicians in the Chicago public school system. The union has advocated for improved pay, benefits, and job security for its members, and it has opposed efforts to vary teacher pay based on performance evaluations. It also called for improvements in the Chicago schools, and asserts that its activities benefit students as well as teachers.

The CTU united several teachers' organizations in Chicago in the wake of a teachers' revolt against banks during the Great Depression. It was chartered in 1937 as Local 1 of the American Federation of Teachers (AFT), in which it played a founding role. It was the largest and most active AFT Local until the 1960s. The CTU won collective bargaining rights in 1966 and conducted several strikes during the 1970s and 1980s. In September 2012, the union began its first strike in 25 years.

The CTU is also affiliated with the Illinois Federation of Teachers, the Chicago Federation of Labor, and the AFL–CIO. It has more than 25,000 members. Current officers come from the Caucus of Rank-and-File Educators, elected in 2010 to replace the longstanding United Progressive Caucus. From that point until her 2018 retirement, Karen Lewis was president. Through a successors election the new officer slate became: President Jesse Sharkey, Vice President Stacy Davis Gates, Recording Secretary Michael Brunson and Financial Secretary Maria Moreno. Following the departure of Sharkey, Stacy Davis Gates assumed the role of President on July 1, 2022.

== Origins and founding ==
The CTU was preceded, in part, by the Chicago Teachers Federation (CTF), an organization of women elementary school teachers founded in 1897.

By the 1930s, Chicago teachers had formed several other different unions, some of which were still segregated by gender. Unrest in the early 1930s united these groups, which had previously struggled to cooperate. The Chicago Teachers Federation played an active role in the American Federation of Teachers (AFT) and retained their status as Local 1. In 1937, Local 1 battled New York's Local 5 over whether the AFT would remain in the American Federation of Labor (AFL) or join the newer and more inclusive Congress of Industrial Organizations (CIO). (New York's Local 5 was at that time the Teachers' Union, which was soon expelled from the AFT after accusations of communism, and replaced by the more moderate United Federation of Teachers.) Soon after the convention (which decided to stay in the AFL), the Chicago Teachers Union was officially chartered by the AFT as an amalgamation of Chicago's multiple teacher unions in Chicago. At this point about 3,500 teachers were members of the new Local. The Chicago Teachers Union was formally established as a merger of the Men's Teachers Union, Federation of Women High School Teachers, Elementary Teachers Union, and Playground Teachers Union at a meeting held at the Chicago Civic Opera House, immediately receiving its charter as Local 1 of the AFT. By September 1938, it was the largest teachers union in the US, with over 8,500 members. The CTF, still under the leadership of its longtime head Margaret Haley, remained separate for some years, based on concerns that the CTU would disproportionately represent the interests of males and high school teachers.

== Before collective bargaining: 1937–1967 ==
When the CTU formed, teachers had become disillusioned about their status as a special class of workers. Many teachers believed they faced discrimination because they were female. At the same time, some male teachers felt undervalued. Teachers also resented the constantly increasing bureaucratic control over their classrooms.

=== Goals ===
The CTU sought collective bargaining rights early on, but Superintendent William Johnson refused to grant them. The union also criticized evaluations (for teachers who wanted to become principals) that it said were administered in a corrupt fashion. By 1939, the CTU had more than doubled in size, to 8,500 members, and organized its members for actions such as mass letter-writing.

In 1948, amid small-scale sickouts and walkouts, the CTU authorized a strike when teachers experienced still more 'payless paydays' due to city mismanagement. The strike was averted hours before it was scheduled to begin, when the school board approved a new budget and announced that the checks due to the teachers had been mailed with all possible haste.

In addition to perennial requests for salary increases, the CTU began pushing for broader changes to Chicago's public schools. It asked the Chicago Police Department to station an officer in each of Chicago's 43 high schools; CPD refused. The CTU continued to pursue the school violence issues, arguing that teachers were being endangered by violent students. During this period the union also sought shorter hours for students and teachers. It also called attention to a mounting teacher shortage, citing over a hundred classrooms without regular or substitute teachers.

During this period, Fewkes and the CTU consistently opposed merit pay policies, proposals which would vary teachers salaries based on evaluations.

=== John Fewkes and anticommunism ===
The CTU's first president was John Fewkes. Fewkes had been the most prominent leader of "Voluntary Emergency Committee" (VEC), a male-dominated group that formed in 1933 and gained prominence by advocating and coordinating militant action. The VEC had been aggressive but not radical, and explicitly sought to exclude communists.

The union, urged on by Fewkes, participated in the AFL's anti-communist purges, and in 1941 voted 5,258 to 892 to expel the New York City Teachers Union, the New York College Teachers Union and Philadelphia Teachers Union from the AFT. The three expelled Locals were large, representing about one quarter of the AFT's members, but the CTU was larger, and its votes were decisive in accomplishing the expulsion.

Fewkes remained CTU President for most of this period. He left the CTU in 1943 to serve as AFT president. In 1944, he took a position with the federal War Production Board. By 1947, he had returned to the CTU for a second term as its president. In 1950, the CTU governing board approved a constitutional amendment to remove limitations on presidential terms; John Fewkes was thereby allowed to run again, and remained CTU president until 1966.

=== Demographics and civil rights ===
Most of Chicago's public school teachers were white single women. Public school teacher was also the most common occupation for black women in Chicago, who were treated by CPS as second-class job candidates: qualified black high school teachers worked in elementary schools or as substitutes; some could not get jobs at all. Teachers came from a shifting mix of white-collar and blue-collar families.

=== Campaign for collective bargaining ===
The CTU intensified its campaign for collective bargaining rights in the 1960s, staging huge demonstrations at the Chicago Board of Education. Pressure increased after the New York recognized collective bargaining rights for the UFT in 1961, and the CTU threatened an illegal strike in 1963–1964 if the School Board would not grant it the same status. The city averted a strike by agreeing to negotiate, and, after long delays (including litigation from a rival union, the Chicago Education Association), the CTU became the official bargaining agent of Chicago teachers in April 1966.

== Internal politics and organization ==
=== Caucus of Rank and File Educators ===
In 2010, the Caucus of Rank and File Educators (CORE), led by President Karen Lewis gained control over the CTU by winning 60% of the vote in a run-off election. CORE ran an aggressive grassroots organizing campaign, and took a strong stance against school privatization. CORE accused the incumbent United Progressive Caucus (UPC) of capitulating to corporate interests, silencing dissent within the union, and collaborating with the city to prevent union outreach at schools.

CORE quickly took action to distinguish itself from UPC, reaffirm its grassroots support, and launch a campaign to defend public education. The new leadership cut pay for union officers and used the savings to expand outreach. Former CTU member John A. Ostenburg criticized Lewis and CORE in 2011 for inexperience and political recklessness, arguing that they will not successfully be able to combat Mayor Rahm Emanuel's entrenched power. CORE represented a major bloc of dissent at the 2012 AFT convention, and held signs in protest of Race to the Top during a speech from President, then Vice President, Joe Biden.

=== 2018 merger with Charter Union Local ===
In spring of 2018, the Chicago Teachers Union and Chicago Association of Charter Teachers and Staff Local 4343 voted to merge, with the charter educators forming a new division within the CTU. On December 4, 2018, CTU members at the Acero charter school network initiated the first strike at a unionized charter school in US history. The strike ended December 9, 2018, in a major victory with the strikers who won sanctuary school protections for their students, enforceable reductions in class size and parity with the existing pay scale at district-run schools.

== Collective bargaining and strikes ==
=== Strikes 1968–1987 ===
Chicago teachers went on strike multiple times in the 1970s and 1980s:

- 1968: "Concerned FTBs" (long-term substitutes) and others engage in wildcat strikes against school segregation and racism—particularly systemic unfairness in the certification, hiring, and promotion of black teachers.
- 1969: Two-day strike results in salary increases, teacher aides, and class size maximum.
- 1971: Four-day strike results in salary increases and full health benefits.
- 1973: Two strikes, of 12 and 11 days, yield improved salary, benefits, preparation time, supplies, and class sizes.
- 1979-1980: Multiple strikes over a payless payday during holiday break in 1979, results in salary increase and improved sick leave and maternity/paternity leave.
- 1984: Four-day strike results in medical care increase and PAC checkoff.
- 1985: Two-day strike for salary and sick leave.
- 1987: Record-breaking 19-day strike under CTU President Jacqueline B. Vaughn wins raises and improvements to health care.

=== 2012 strike ===
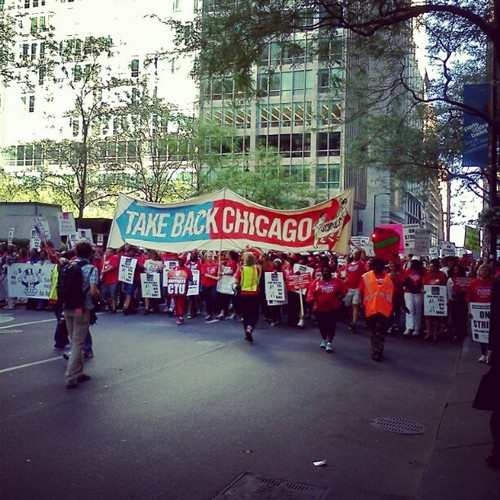
Striking members of the Chicago Teachers Union marching through the Chicago Loop on September 11, 2012

Under the leadership of CORE, the CTU pushed hard in negotiations with the city. Early on, the CTU made the decision to decline an offer of pay increases combined with layoffs. When the city would not agree to the CTU's core demands, including an expansion of programs like art and music at the city's most underfunded high schools, CTU members voted overwhelmingly (90% of teachers and 98% of those who cast ballots) to authorize a strike.

On September 10, 2012, the Chicago Teachers Union began a strike after CTU President Lewis declared that negotiations with the city were not succeeding. This strike was the CTU's first since 1987, and the first strike ever for many of the teachers involved. Regulations required them to make contract negotiations an issue in the strike, and the teachers indeed sought better pay, better benefits, and protections for teachers who lose their jobs due to school closures.

The striking teachers also wanted to call attention to a number of education issues, particularly what they defined as a broad attack on public schooling by corporate privatizers. In particular they demand a decrease in high-stakes testing for students, and an increase in music, art, and gym programs available at public schools. They also called for smaller class sizes and paid preparation time.

On September 11, 2012, the Service Employees International Union Local 1 informed companies that some of their members might go on strike with the teachers.

On September 14, 2012, the teachers reached a tentative agreement with the city, which included preferences for teachers who have been laid off due to a school closing to be hired in another school, and student test scores having less of a role in teacher evaluations than the city had originally planned. This tentative agreement did not hold, however, and the strike continued, at which point Mayor Emanuel announced his intention to seek a legal injunction, forcing teachers back to work. On September 17, 2012, Mayor Emanuel's efforts to end the strike stalled as the walkout went into the second week. Delegates from the CTU voted to end the strike on September 18, 2012. Students began their return to the schools on Wednesday, September 19, 2012. The CTU was still required to ratify the contract with the Union's 29,000 teachers.

Following the end of the strike, leaders of the Union held town hall meetings in major US cities to underscore the belief that community collaboration is key in creating beneficial changes in education, as opposed to top-down imposition by governors or mayors. The Union planned to hold town hall meetings in Chicago, Cleveland, Minneapolis, New Orleans, New York, Philadelphia, Pittsburgh, San Francisco, St. Paul, and Tampa.

=== 2015–2016 contract dispute (threatened strike) ===
Following the expiration of the contract in June 2015, CPS teachers continued to work without a contract for a year while the union and district negotiated. In September 2016, union members voted overwhelmingly to strike if an agreement could not be reached, setting a deadline of October 11. Minutes before midnight on October 10, the district and union reached a tentative agreement, avoiding a strike.

=== 2019 strike ===
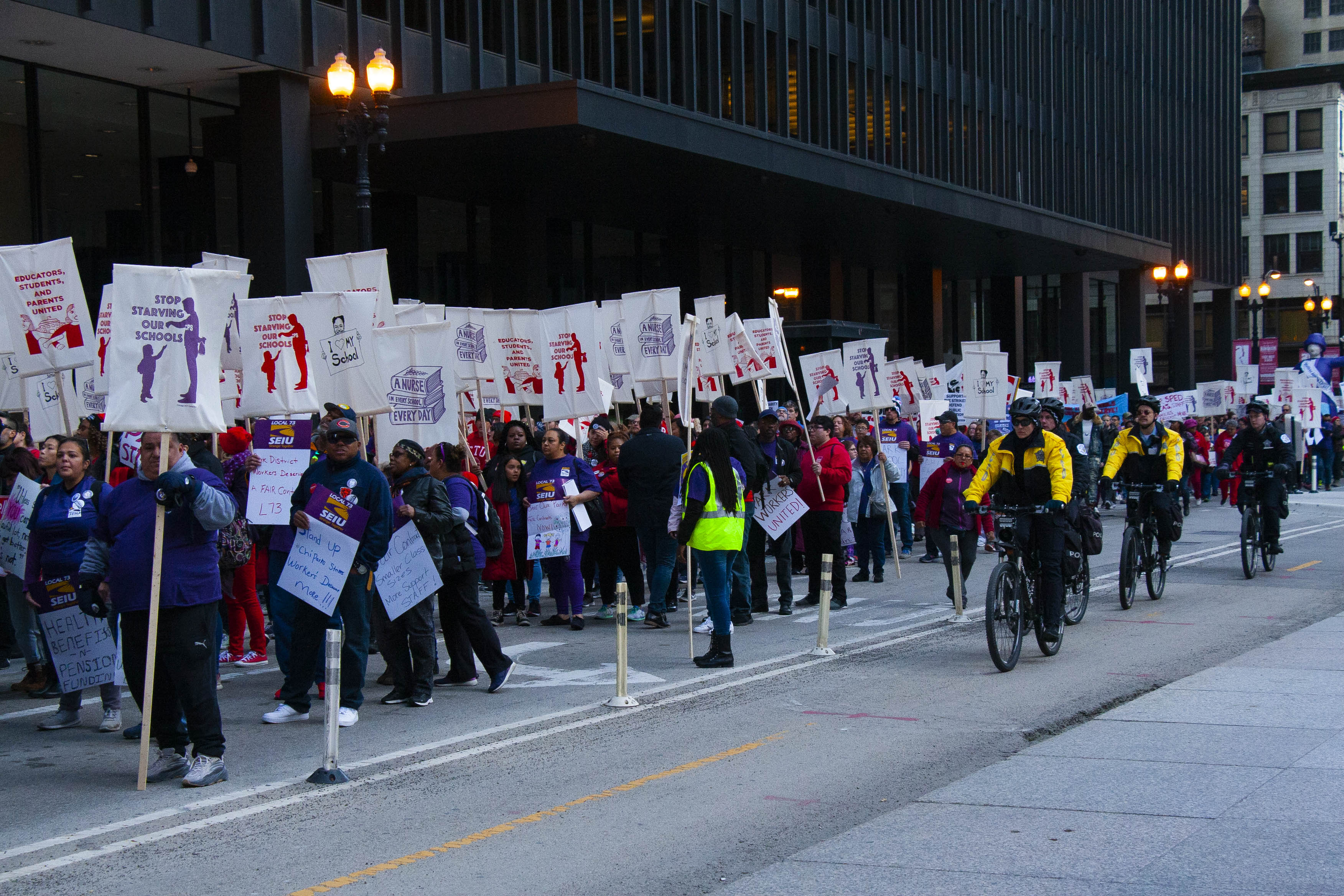
Chicago teachers marching during a demonstration on October 14, 2019

After the expiration of the CPS contract with CTU in June 2019, a contract dispute emerged. Vermont Senator Bernie Sanders spoke at a rally hosted by CTU and SEIU Local 73 in preparation of the strike on September 24. On September 27, 2019, CTU members voted to authorize a potential strike starting on October 17 if a contract deal is not reached. The union's top priorities in contract negotiations are reducing classroom size and increasing the number of support staff (such as nurses and social workers). On October 16, 2019, CPS cancelled classes for October 17, 2019, in anticipation of the CTU strike. CTU delegates officially voted to go on strike hours afterwards. Mayor Lori Lightfoot announced that CPS would not add any makeup days for any school days lost during the strike, stating that "There's no plan to make up any days... We want to make sure we get a deal done." At the time, Illinois state law required that all school districts in Illinois include at least 176 days in the school year. Lightfoot's decision broke this mandate, as the 2019–2020 school year was exactly 176 days long. Additionally, it was noted that teachers could lose pay if the strike days were not added back to the district calendar.

On Thursday, October 17, 2019, teachers took to picket lines early in the morning, and the CTU stated that it planned to resume negotiations with the city at Malcolm X College. Later that afternoon, CPS announced that classes had been cancelled for the following day, as even though negotiations seemed to be progressing, there was no foreseeable agreement in the near feature. On Friday, October 18, 2019, teachers continued on the second day of the strike, meaning that students had attended school two days (Tuesday and Wednesday) out of the five days from October 14–18 (CPS students did not go to school on Monday due to the observance of Columbus Day). That weekend, CTU and CPS continued negotiating. While both sides noted progress over Saturday, Lightfoot noted that she would be "...very surprised if classes [would] open on Monday." The following day, Sunday, October 20, 2019, CPS canceled school for Monday the 21st. Even though tentative agreements had been made on eight points, CPS canceled school for Monday as CTU had not voted to end the strike yet.

On Monday, October 21, 2019, CTU members entered the third school day and second calendar week of the strike. Negotiations between CPS and CTU continued, and Lightfoot sent the union a letter asking them to end the strike while negotiations continued. CTU president Jesse Sharkey noted that "...the letter [from Lightfoot] I received today dashed my hope for a quick settlement." That afternoon, Mayor Lightfoot canceled CPS classes for Tuesday, stating that "...CTU has not scheduled a House of Delegates vote, which would be necessary to end their strike... As a result, it will not be possible to hold classes tomorrow." The next day, Tuesday, October 22, 2019, negotiations continued, and 2020 democratic presidential primary candidate Elizabeth Warren joined the striking teachers. Later, Mayor Lightfoot canceled CPS classes for Wednesday, October 23, stating once again that "...CTU has not scheduled a House of Delegates vote, which would be necessary to end their strike... As a result, it will not be possible to hold classes tomorrow." It was noted that on Tuesday, negotiations appeared to be "at an impasse", and the majority of CTU's 40-person bargaining team was not expected to return to the negotiating table. CTU President Sharkey expressed that the proposed contract did "...not have adequate enforcement mechanisms on staffing." After negotiations had ended Tuesday evening, several issues remained unresolved, such as class-size caps, the duration of the contract, salaries, and health benefits. At this point, teachers planned to keep the strike going until at least Thursday the 24th, or longer if necessary. On Wednesday, October 23, 2019, negotiations continued at Malcolm X College. Teachers only picketed in front of schools until 8:00 a.m. local time. Then, they proceeded to rally in the downtown Loop and converge in front of the city hall. Lightfoot presented her 2020 city budget plan Wednesday evening, at the end of the fifth school day of the strike. Emails and phone calls were disseminated to students and parents, informing them that classes were canceled for Thursday, October 24, as both the CTU and CPS still did not expect an agreement any time soon. The following day, on Thursday the 24th, teachers returned to the picket lines at 7:00 a.m., and the president of the Flight Attendant's Union, Sara Nelson, was expected to join the striking teachers to show support. CTU also scheduled civil disobedience training for its members at the CTU headquarters at 3:00 p.m., suggesting a prolonged strike. On October 29, The CTU and SEIU marched to the Sterling Bay headquarters to demand that the development return TIF funds given to the company that should have gone to schools. At the development, 9 CTU members were arrested when they did a sit-in located in the lobby of the Sterling Bay Headquarters. Chicago police said they were called just before 2 p.m. to a building in the 1300 block of West Fulton "where numerous individuals were inside and refusing to leave." "Police gave the offenders warnings to leave the building, which were refused," a statement from Chicago Police News Affairs read. Finally, during a House of Delegates vote in October 30, the union agreed to accept a tentative agreement in a 362–242 vote. A press conference later that night reinforced the mayor's stance that the days missed during the strike would not be made up.
