= Making Oprah =

Podcast about Oprah Winfrey

- Genre: bio-podcast

Cast and voices
- Hosted by: Jenn White

Production
- Production: Jenn White; Colin McNulty; Joel Meyer; Ben Calhoun; Tricia Bobeda

Publication
- No. of seasons: 1
- No. of episodes: 3
- Original release: November 10 – November 22, 2016
- Provider: WBEZ

Related
- Website: www.wbez.org/shows/making/71b8de57-b2be-4e03-8481-683258de3ec1/page/2

Making Oprah is an American bio-podcast produced by WBEZ and hosted by journalist Jenn White. The three-part series tells the history and development of Oprah Winfrey's professional career. It premiered on November 10, 2016. The podcast was recommended by Wired, Time, and The New York Times.

== Synopsis ==
The podcast tells the story of how Oprah Winfrey became one of the best known talk show hosts and moguls in American pop culture. It follows her career from her first broadcasting job as a local TV host for a Baltimore show called People Are Talking, up to present day. The show's topics include reasons behind why audiences connected to Winfrey the way they did, the development of Harpo Studios, and how Winfrey turned to spirituality, all contextualized in terms of the American TV landscape. It discusses some controversial episodes, such as her interview with skinheads, when Tom Cruise jumped on her couch, and the "you get a car" episode.

Host Jenn White interviews several of Winfrey's associates including Phil Donahue. Winfrey appears for an interview in the last episode of the podcast. White shares the significance of the project as a Black woman in media in her forties.

== Production ==
The show was produced by WBEZ anchor and host Jenn White, Colin McNulty, Joel Meyer, Ben Calhoun, and Tricia Bobeda. It was released as a 3-episode series. The podcast debuted on November 10, 2016, with one episode released online each week.

WBEZ succeeded with series with Making Obama (2018) and Making Beyoncé (2019).

== Episodes ==
Episode #	Date aired	Title
1	November 10, 2016	No Strategy, No Plan, No Formula
2	November 17, 2016	Skinheads And Scented Candles
3	November 22, 2016	YOU GET A CAR!

== Critical reception ==
The podcast was called "excellent" by Sarah Larson of The New Yorker. The show was recommended by outlets including Wired, Time, The New York Times, USA Today, Marie Claire, and Vulture.

Making Oprah was the most successful podcast by WBEZ after its release.
