= Chicago Public Media =

US not-profit media company

- Abbreviation: CPM
- Type: non-profit
- Tax ID no.: 36-3687394
- CEO: Melissa Bell
- Subsidiaries: WBEZ; WBEW; WRTE; Chicago Sun-Times; This American Life; Wait Wait... Don't Tell Me!
- Website: www.wbez.org
- Formerly called: The WBEZ Alliance

Chicago Public Media (CPM) is a not-for-profit radio and print media company. CPM operates as the primary National Public Radio member organization for Chicago. It owns three non-commercial educational FM broadcast stations and one FM translator. In addition to local news and information productions, it produces the programs Wait Wait... Don't Tell Me! for NPR stations, and This American Life which is distributed by PRX to other radio stations. On January 30, 2022, Chicago Public Media acquired the Chicago Sun-Times daily newspaper.

== Radio stations ==
- 91.5 WBEZ is Chicago's main public radio station. CPM and WBEZ were both known as "Chicago Public Radio" in the past. It is rebroadcast by 90.7 WBEQ in Morris, 91.1 WBEK in Kankakee, and translators 91.1 W216CL in Chicago and 91.7 FM W219CD in Elgin.
- 89.5 WBEW at Chesterton, Indiana is an urban formatted station branded "Vocalo".
- 90.7 WRTE in Chicago has rebroadcast College of DuPage-owned jazz station WDCB since 2016.

The organization was started to take over the operation of 91.5 WBEZ from the Chicago Board of Education in 1990. Until April 2010, the company's legal name was The WBEZ Alliance, Inc. and it used the name Chicago Public Radio (CPR) for its primary radio station and corporate identity. On June 22, 2012, it was announced that CPM had purchased troubled WRTE from the National Museum of Mexican Art.

Chicago Public Radio/Chicago Public Media also previously managed Loyola University of Chicago's WLUW (88.7 FM), heard on the North Side of Chicago and adjacent suburbs, for several years in the early 21st century, until 2007.

In 2024, Chicago Public Media declared Melissa Bell as the new CEO for WBEZ and Chicago Sun-Times. Bell is a digital journalist and co-founder of Vox.

== Print media ==
On January 30, 2022, Chicago Public Media formally took over the financially-troubled Chicago Sun-Times daily newspaper, which thereby became not-for-profit. A nonbinding agreement for the deal had been announced in September 2021, and the board of Chicago Public Media had signalled its approval on January 18, 2022. The final arrangement was backed with $61 million from several philanthropic organizations.

== Productions ==
- Chicago Amplified — a web-based audio archive of educational events in Chicago.
- Off-Air Series — non-broadcast events held around the Chicago area.
- Odyssey — a daily talk show from 2001 to 2005.
- Sound Opinions — a rock music talk show with news, interviews, commentary, and performances; in 2020 production transferred from Chicago Public Media to Columbia College Chicago; distributed by Public Radio Exchange; previously on 93.1 WXRT.
- Third Coast International Audio Festival — formerly part of Chicago Public Media; its program Re:sound aired on WBEZ until circa 2019.
- This American Life — a radio magazine based around a theme in each episode. As of 2017 through 2022, the show is self-distributed, using Public Radio Exchange to send episodes to radio stations; the related TV show with the same name ran for 2 seasons from 2007 to 2009.
- Wait Wait... Don't Tell Me! — a comedy quiz show co-produced with National Public Radio and distributed through NPR.
- Worldview — a daily international-affairs program that ran from 1994 to 2019.
