= Nerdette =

Interview podcast

- Genre: Culture
- Format: Interview; panel discussion
- Language: English

Cast and voices
- Hosted by: Greta Johnsen; Tricia Bobeda (until 2018)

Production
- Length: 20–40 minutes

Publication
- Original release: 2013
- Provider: WBEZ
- Updates: Weekly

Related
- Website: www.wbez.org/shows/nerdette/b2c2c10b-1e7f-43ca-b3ad-55d6fd33722c

Nerdette was a weekly talk podcast produced and distributed by WBEZ/Chicago Public Media. It was cancelled in 2024.

It was created in 2013 by Tricia Bobeda and Greta Johnsen, and is now hosted by Johnsen. It is an interview show featuring conversations with journalists, advice columnists, authors, astronauts, and more. Previous guests include Tom Hanks, Bill Nye, George R.R. Martin, Margaret Atwood, Roxane Gay, and Lizzo.

An offshoot podcast, Nerdette Recaps with Peter Sagal, includes Bobeda, Johnsen, and Wait Wait ... Don't Tell Me! host Sagal discussing shows like Game of Thrones (2016-2020) and His Dark Materials (2019), and a handful of movies from the 1990s (2020).

== History ==
Johnsen was a host and reporter at WBEZ when she launched it in late May 2013 with Bobeda, a producer at WBEZ at the time.

The duo described it as "a safe space for nerding out about all the things you're watching, reading, listening to and encountering IRL (in real life)." Bobeda's first interaction with Johnsen was when Johnsen overheard Bobeda in a debate in the WBEZ newsroom about Star Wars.

In April 2016, a spin-off of Nerdette was launched in partnership with Peter Sagal, host of NPR’s Wait Wait...Don’t Tell Me! to recap season 5 of the HBO series Game of Thrones. Nerdette Recaps Game of Thrones with Peter Sagal continued with each Game of Thrones season until the final season aired in 2019. Nerdette Recaps continued beyond Game of Thrones with seasons including recaps of HBO's His Dark Materials in 2019 and reviews of 1990s movies in 2020.

In 2018, Bobeda left the show and Johnsen became the sole host.

In addition to its weekly talk episodes, Nerdette also started a monthly book club in 2020.

== Production ==
Greta Johnsen hosted and produced the podcast, along with producer Anna Bauman and executive producer Brendan Banaszak.

=== Format ===
The format typically included discussion between Greta Johnsen and a panel of guests to discuss relevant cultural topics. Topics have included re-entry to society after the COVID-19 pandemic, along with other pop culture news of the week.

Twice a month, Nerdette had two book club episodes—one is a conversation with the author, and the other is a panel discussion that includes voice recordings from the audience.

Episodes were usually 20–40 minutes long and released one to two times a week: The regular episodes were every Friday, and book club episodes come out on Tuesdays.

== Reception ==
Nerdette was named Best Culture Podcast by the Chicago Reader in 2017.
