= WRTE =

Jazz music public radio station in Chicago

Simulcasts WDCB, Glen Ellyn

Chicago, Illinois; United States
- Broadcast area: Chicago metropolitan area
- Frequency: 90.7 MHz (HD Radio)

Programming
- Format: Jazz, variety
- Affiliations: PRX

Ownership
- Owner: Chicago Public Media
- Sister stations: WBEZ

History
- First air date: 1970
- Former call signs: WCYC (1970–1997)
- Former frequencies: 88.7 MHz (1970–1988); 90.5 MHz (1988–2013)
- Call sign meaning: Station was known as Radio Arte

Technical information
- Licensing authority: FCC
- Facility ID: 10794
- Class: D
- ERP: 6 watts
- HAAT: 107.3 meters (352 ft)
- Transmitter coordinates: 41°50′26.00″N 87°43′5.00″W

Links
- Public license information: Public file; LMS
- Webcast: Listen live
- Website: Official website

WRTE (90.7 FM) is an American radio station broadcasting a jazz / variety format. It is licensed to Chicago, Illinois, United States, and serves the city of Chicago. The station is owned by Chicago Public Media. WRTE broadcasts in the HD Radio format.

== History ==
=== WCYC ===
WRTE signed on in 1970 as WCYC, owned by the Boys Clubs of Chicago on 88.7 MHz. In 1988, the station's frequency was changed to 90.5 MHz. The station aired an urban contemporary format and was staffed by teenage volunteers. DJs were not allowed to say their last names, nicknames, or street names on the air, after a volunteer DJ was shot by someone who was waiting for them outside of the studio. Some of WCYC's volunteers went on to work as DJs at WGCI-FM. The station also carried The Lutheran Hour.

=== Radio Arte ===
The Boys and Girls Clubs sold the radio station to the Mexican Fine Arts Center Museum (now National Museum of Mexican Art) in 1996, and its call sign was changed to WRTE on July 1, 1997. It was branded "Radio Arte", and aired a bilingual format, with Spanish and English language programming, as well as Spanish-language rock. In the final years of the National Museum of Mexican Art's ownership of the station, it underwent fundraising challenges, and in the spring of 2011 the station was put up for sale.

=== Chicago Public Media ownership ===
On June 22, 2012, it was announced that Chicago Public Media would purchase WRTE for $350,000 cash, plus program announcements over four years, valued at $100,000. The sale was consummated on December 31, 2012. On July 31, 2012, Chicago Public Media applied to the U.S. Federal Communications Commission (FCC) to move WRTE's transmitter site from 2801 S. Ridgeway in Chicago, to University Hall on the East campus of the University of Illinois at Chicago. On September 28, 2012, the FCC granted Chicago Public Media a construction permit to move the station's transmitter site to its new location. On October 12, 2012, Chicago Public Media applied with the FCC change the station's frequency to 90.7 MHz FM. On November 15, 2012 the FCC granted a construction permit for the move to 90.7 MHz. The effective radiated power decreased to 6 watts and the HAAT increased to 107.3 meters. On February 11, 2013 WRTE moved to 90.7 FM, and it began simulcasting WBEW's "Vocalo" programming.

In May 2016, an agreement was finalized for WRTE to simulcast Glen Ellyn jazz station WDCB, strengthening the western suburban station's coverage in the city of Chicago, and ending the Vocalo simulcast.
