= Abraham Mauricio Salazar =

Mexican artist

Abraham Mauricio Salazar (born 1957) is a Nahuatl Indian artist, living in Oaxaca, Mexico. For most of his life, Salazar has been working as a farmer, painter, and teacher. His primary medium is papel amate, a folk craft tradition that the Nahuatls have used for over two millennia. The painting style takes its name from the medium that is used – “papel amate”, paper that is made from the bark of the ficus tree.

Salazar is one of the most highly respected traditional bark painters in the State of Oaxaca. In a highly distinctive style, he depicts the sights and sounds of his home village through sophisticated compositions and juxtapositions of color. Salazar along with his brother, Roberto Mauricio Salazar, have painted on papel amate since they were children. Learning the technique from their father and other family members. Though unschooled in any formal setting, Abraham Salazar has studied art and executes pastoral scenes of Mexican campesino (peasant) life that are outstanding examples of the form. With his brother Roberto Mauricio Salazar, and Felix Camilo Ayala, Juan Camilo Ayala, he formed a cooperative.

While many in the tradition never became known for their works, Salazar was the subject of a seminal (now out-of-print) book on the high-quality papel amate paintings of the Nahuatl.

== Exhibitions ==
- 2006 "The African Presence in México: From Yanga to the Present" National Museum of Mexican Art
- 2001 "Multiplicity: Prints from the Permanent Collection"
- 1999 "¡Provecho! A Taste of the Permanent Collection"

== Illustrations ==
- Antonio Saldívar, Ciclo Mágico de los Días. Testimonio de Un Poblado Indigena Mexicano. (Magical Cycles of the Days. Stories of an Indigenous Mexican Town), México City: Consejo Nacional de Fomento Educativo, 1985, Drawings by Abraham Mauricio Salazar. ISBN 968-29-0561-3.
- Girón, Nicole, and Abraham Mauricio Salazar, El Barrio. Patria, Mexico, D.F. 1983
