= Odyssey (WBEZ) =

Odyssey was a daily talk show of ideas produced by WBEZ Chicago Public Radio. Hosted by Gretchen Helfrich, Odyssey explored topics ranging from religion in the public sphere to reasoning about risk; pacifism to post-national identity; memory to Microsoft; societal views on mental health to the state of marriage.

Odyssey first went on the air in Chicago in 1998 and was launched as Chicago Public Radio's newest national program in November 2001.

"Talk radio has a reputation for being either inflammatory or pretentious," said Torey Malatia, the president and general manager of Chicago Public Radio. "Odyssey moves this format in a new direction by providing a forum for the best minds in fields as diverse as politics, science, culture, philosophy, law, and the arts to engage in insightful conversation."

Barack Obama made at least three appearances on the show.

The theme music for the show was written by little-known Chicago band OK Go, who later went on to wider fame. Helfrich and other radio personalities also appeared in a video for the band.

Odyssey ended production on September 30, 2005, and the audio is archived at Archive.org. When the show ended, its host Gretchen Helfrich enrolled in the University of Chicago Law School, graduating in 2009 with honors. In 2014 she joined the civil rights law firm of Loevy & Loevy.
