= WBEK =

WBEK may refer to:

- WBEK (FM), a radio station (91.1 FM) licensed to serve Kankakee, Illinois, United States
- WAGT-CD, a low-power television station (channel 16) licensed to serve Augusta, Georgia, United States, which held the call signs WBEK-LP, WBEK-CA, or WBEK-CD from 1995 to 2015
