= Torey Malatia =

Radio producer and manager

- Born: August 8, 1951 (age 75); Oak Park, Illinois, U.S.
- Occupations: Radio producer and manager
- Known for: WBEZ general manager This American Life
- Spouse: Elizabeth Carson Manley

Torey Malatia (born August 1951) is an American journalist, radio producer, and public media manager. In 2016 he was named president, CEO, and general manager of Rhode Island Public Radio. Until resigning in July 2013, he was chief executive officer and president of the board of directors of Chicago Public Media and general manager of radio station WBEZ. He is also a member of the board of the Public Radio Exchange, a program distributor, and the Station Resource Group, a public radio program development and fundraising group.

Malatia began work as program director of WBEZ radio in Chicago, Illinois, in 1993 and in 1996 was promoted to station manager.

In 1995, journalist Ira Glass and Malatia created the radio program This American Life (originally titled Your Radio Playhouse).

Prior to work in radio, Malatia was a columnist for Phoenix New Times, an alternative weekly newspaper in Phoenix, Arizona.

== Biography ==
Torey Malatia was born in Oak Park, Illinois, a village in the Chicago area. He attended Brophy College Preparatory, Arizona State University, where he received B.A. and M.A. degrees in English literature. He carried out additional postgraduate study at the University of Toronto.

Malatia is married to artist Elizabeth Carson Manley, and they live in Rhode Island.

== Public radio ==
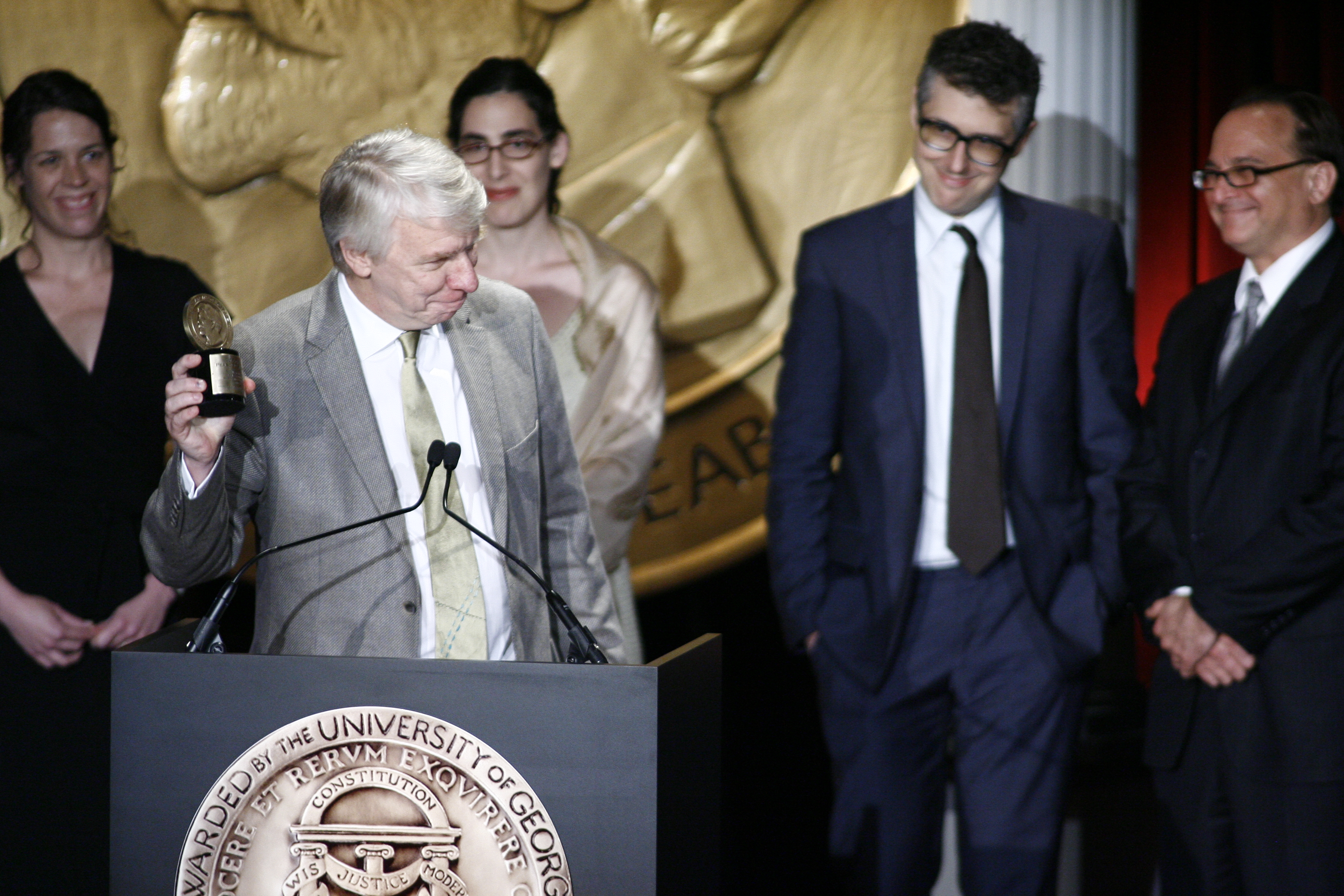
Julie Snyder, Jack Hitt, Sarah Koenig, Ira Glass and Malatia accept the Peabody Award, June 2007

Malatia has spent much of his career in public radio, primarily with Chicago Public Media and its flagship station WBEZ. He began work with WFMT, a public radio station in Chicago, in 1986. In 1990 he became program director of KUOW, a public station in Seattle, Washington. After leaving KUOW Malatia worked as a talk show producer at WLS, a non-public (for-profit) radio station in Chicago. He was hired as WBEZ vice president in charge of programing in 1993. In 1996 Malatia became WBEZ's general manager and assumed the leadership of Chicago Public Media as chief executive officer and president of the board of directors.

In November 1995 journalist Ira Glass and Malatia began Your Radio Playhouse, a documentary and entertainment series on WBEZ. After sixteen weekly episodes were aired, the program was renamed This American Life and syndicated to public stations across the country via Public Radio International.

Malatia was a member of the board of directors of two public media organizations. WBEZ is one of several founding member stations of the Public Radio Exchange (PRX), a non-profit organization that distributes programing to public radio stations; Malatia is on the PRX board. He is also a member of the board of directors of Station Resource Group (SRG), an organization established to provide analysis to public media organizations to help them with fundraising and programing.

In 2007 Chicago Public Media launched Vocalo and Vocalo.org, a radio station and web site designed to appeal to a younger audience than is typical for public radio. Financial contributors to WBEZ criticized Chicago Public Media and Malatia for funding the project without publicizing the fact on WBEZ.

Controversy erupted in 2012 when WBEZ cancelled the program Smiley & West, an interview program hosted by Tavis Smiley and Cornel West. Smiley criticized comments from Malatia suggesting that the program focused unduly on advocacy for African American social and political issues and that the program's guests were "far less inclusive" than the station wished. In response, Malatia published an editorial at Current.org criticizing "advocacy journalism" and defending the program's cancellation.
