= Jenn White =

American journalist

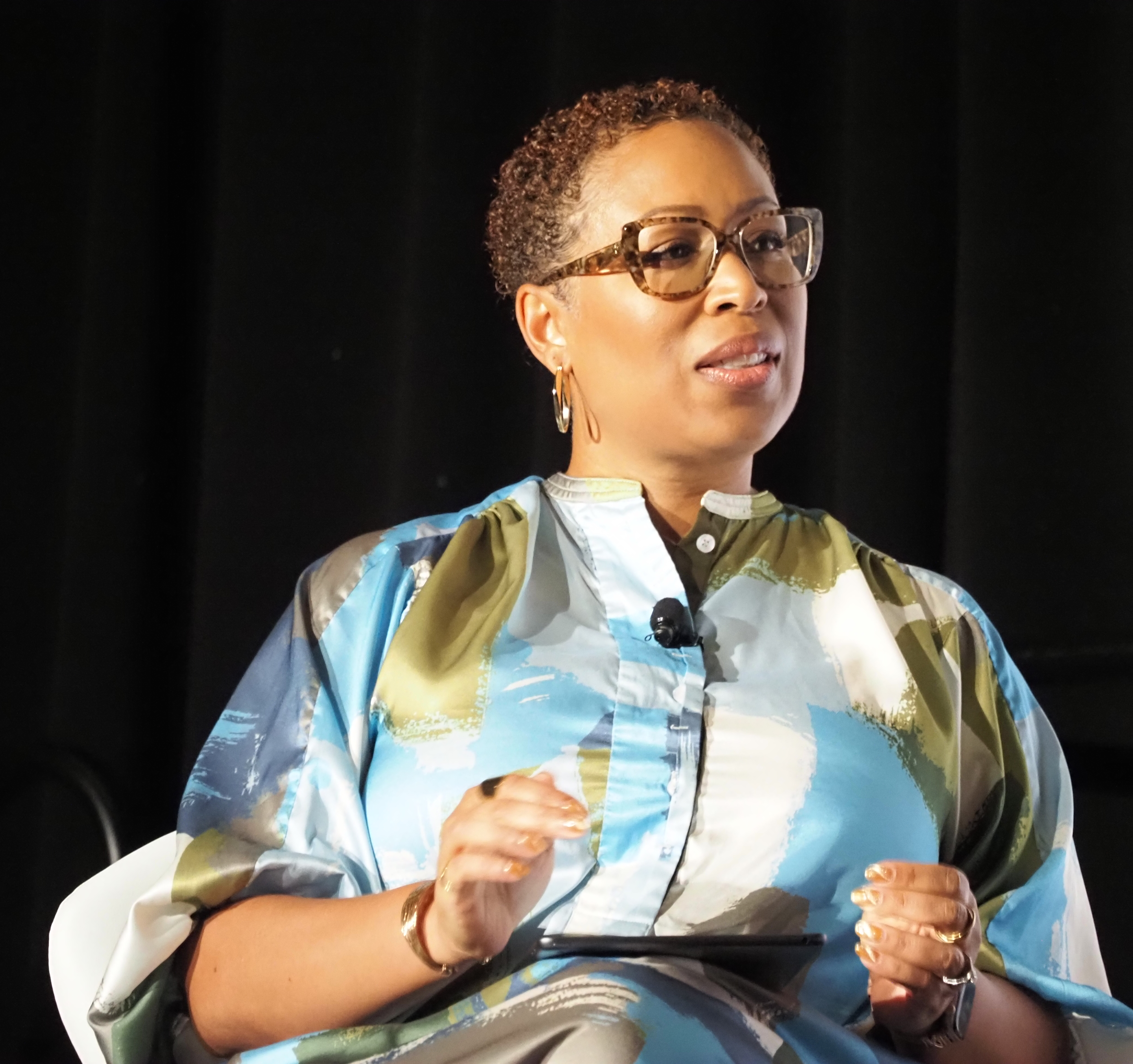
- White in 2026
- Born: Jennifer White; 1974 or 1975 (age 51–52); Detroit, Michigan, U.S.
- Education: University of Michigan (BA)
- Occupation: Journalist
- Years active: 1999-present
- Employers: Michigan Radio (1999–2016); WBEZ (2016–2020); WAMU (2020–present)
- Notable work: Making Oprah

Jennifer White (born 1974 or 1975) is an American journalist and radio personality. She is the host of the radio program 1A.

She has worked in public radio since 1999, and began her broadcast journalism career as host of Michigan Radio's All Things Considered. She later moved to Chicago's WBEZ where she hosted Reset with Jenn White, as well as the podcasts Making Oprah, Making Beyoncé, and 16 Shots. White became host of 1A in July 2020, produced by WAMU in Washington, DC.

== Career ==
White was born in Detroit and raised on the city's west side, one of seven children. At age 16, her sister introduced her to the NPR show Car Talk. She became further interested in the radio through performing arts classes at Cass Technical High School. White received her bachelor's degree from the University of Michigan.

In 1999, she took a job in fundraising at Michigan Radio WUOM-FM in Ann Arbor and also completed some sporadic on-air work. Her first official radio broadcasting job was in 2010 when she took a job on Michigan Radio's All Things Considered.

In 2016, White was hired at WBEZ in Chicago as part of the program Morning Shift. She later hosted a program focused on local news, Reset with Jenn White. In January 2019, she was named host of Morning Shift.

While at WBEZ, White developed and hosted the podcasts Making Oprah and Making Beyoncé. Making Oprah was the station's most popular podcast and received positive critical reception. In 2018, she co-produced 16 Shots, a podcast about the murder of Laquan McDonald, with the Chicago Tribune.

White was selected as a permanent host of national radio program 1A to replace inaugural host Joshua Johnson. The show covers a range of topics including politics and pop culture, and White began in July 2020.

== Personal life ==
White is married. She and her husband reside in Washington, D.C.
