= Pilsen Wellness Center =

Pilsen Wellness Center, Inc.
- Founded: 1975
- Founders: Albert Vazquez
- Type: Nonprofit organization
- Location: Chicago, IL
- Members: 9
- Key people: Albert Vazquez - Founder; Francisco Cisneros - CEO; Wendy Sosa - Secretary; Joseph Mulcrone - Director; Peter Trzyna - Director; Marbella Marsh - Director; Louis C Waddle - Chairman; Jose Salgado - Treasurer; James Cullinan - Director; Frank De Avila - Director; Elroy Salazar - Director
- Revenue: $10,719,708 (FY 2011)
- Employees: 252
- Volunteers: 41
- Website: pilsenwellnesscenter.org

Pilsen Wellness Center, Inc. (previously known as Pilsen-Little Village Community Mental Health Center, Inc.) is a non-profit organization that has historically serviced the predominantly Latino communities of Pilsen and Little Village in the city of Chicago.

An outgrowth of a federally funded program which began in 1967, Pilsen Wellness Center was founded by Albert Vazquez in 1975. Since that time, the agency has grown into an organization with a diverse funding base, offering a comprehensive array of social services through several programs.

== Mission statement ==
The mission of the Pilsen-Little Village Community Mental Health Center, Inc. is to provide holistic health services to the Chicago, metropolitan community through the effective management of all organizational and community resources. The agency provides culturally relevant and linguistically appropriate services, which preserve the family structure and facilitates the acquisition of medical, social, counseling care and skills training that leads to empowerment and self-reliance.

== Organization ==
Pilsen Wellness Center has a nine-member Board of Directors and is managed by an Executive Director. The agency is organized around an administrative office and four divisions: Mental Health, Substance Abuse, Youth Services, and Education.

- Mental health

Outpatient and residential services

- Substance abuse

Prevention and treatment via outpatient methadone services.

- Youth services

Home visits and Doula services

- Education

In partnership with Youth Connection Charter School the agency manages Latino Youth High School, an alternative charter school that serves students seeking a second chance for a high school diploma.

== State audits ==
In 1999 an audit conducted by the Office of the Auditor General for the state of Illinois uncovered over $200,000 worth of expenditures, which were inappropriately charged to State programs at taxpayer expense and sometimes without documentation. According to the report the CEO took out a $15,000 interest-free loan from the center, which is prohibited by state law. The money was repaid 18 months later after which the CEO awarded to himself a $17,500 salary bonus the following week. 97 employees were also paid over $20,000 in bonuses that were initially classified as office expenses and not report on their W-2s. The findings led to the resignation of Albert Vazquez, the CEO and founder of the agency.

In 2008, according to a Fox News investigation, Illinois state lawmakers ordered the Office of the Auditor General to conduct a special audit of Pilsen Wellness Center. During the audit the State found that almost a third of the agency's employees did not have paperwork on file to prove they were qualified for their jobs. Additionally, the auditors also discovered that a relative of the current CEO, Francisco Cisneros, received a large raise just six days after being hired.

== Fox News investigation ==
In 2010 a Fox News investigation alleged that the CEO and executive director of the Pilsen Wellness Center hired numerous family members to work at the agency. According to internal agency documents and interviews obtained by Fox News, the director's wife, mother, son, three brothers, four sisters and two nieces all had jobs at the agency. The investigation also revealed that two adult children of Illinois State Senator Martin Sandoval were employed by the agency. Sandoval was one of several lawmakers who "steered state funding" to the center, the news report said.
