= Melissa Bell (journalist) =

American journalist and technologist

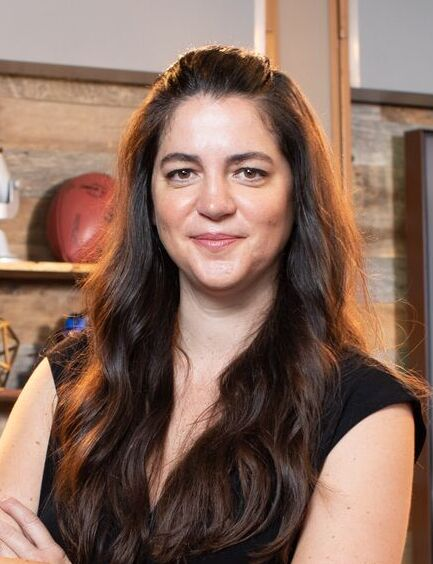
- Bell in 2018
- Born: 1978 or 1979 (age 47–48)
- Education: Georgetown University; Northwestern University
- Employer: Chicago Public Media

Melissa Bell is an American journalist and technologist. She helped launch the Indian business newspaper Mint, and held several positions at The Washington Post, starting in 2010. She and Ezra Klein left the newspaper to co-found the news and opinion website Vox with Matthew Yglesias in 2014. Bell was named vice president of growth and analytics for Vox Media in 2015, and was the company's publisher from 2016 until 2024. She is the current CEO of Chicago Public Media.

== Education ==
Bell attended Georgetown University, in Washington, D.C., and planned to attend law school. She was working as a legal assistant at a New York law firm when the September 11 attacks occurred. She left New York City a year later and took a variety of jobs, including as a bartender in Vail, Colorado, and a waitress at a race track. Encouraged by her mother, she enrolled at Northwestern University's Medill School of Journalism, and interned at India's Hindustan Times. She graduated with a master's degree in 2006.

== Career ==
During her time in India, Bell met Raju Narisetti, who hired her to help launch the Delhi-based daily business newspaper Mint. She wrote for and edited the paper's weekend lifestyle magazine. Bell joined The Washington Post in 2010, where she worked as a blogger and reporter. She wrote a column for the style section and about online culture, and in 2012 was promoted to lead the paper's blog strategy.

While director of platforms for The Washington Post, she and Ezra Klein left to co-found the website Vox with Matt Yglesias in early 2014. She was executive editor and senior product manager for the new website. In this role, she led the development of the site and managed teams focused on analytics, graphics, and the news app. Bell was appointed vice president of growth and analytics for Vox Media in 2015. She worked on audience and new product development, and established best practices for all of Vox Media's sites (Curbed, Eater, Polygon, Racked, Recode, SB Nation, The Verge, and Vox). Bell was named publisher of Vox Media in mid 2016, with responsibilities for audience and brand development.

In June 2024, Bell was named CEO of Chicago Public Media, which oversees the Chicago Sun-Times and NPR member station WBEZ.

=== Recognition ===
Bell appeared in Columbia Journalism Review's 2014 list of "16 women whose digital startups deserve Vox-level plaudits". In 2015, she was included in Marie Claire's "New Guard" list of the "most connected women in America", and was named one of the "most powerful women in Washington" by the Washingtonian. Bell appeared in Folio's 2016 "Director-Level Doers" list, recognizing the 100 "most forward-thinking and innovative leaders in magazine media". In 2017, she was included in Digiday's 2017 "changemakers" list of fifty people "making media and marketing more modern", as well as the Washingtonian's "40 Under 40" list.

In 2025, Bell was inducted into the Medill School of Journalism’s Hall of Achievement at Northwestern University.
