= Diana Solís =

Diana Solís (born 1956) is a Mexican-born photographer, visual artist, and educator based in Chicago. Her documentary photography includes depictions of Pilsen, Chicago's literary communities, and feminist and LGBTQ movements in Chicago and Mexico. She also works in painting, illustration, printmaking, and public art. Her photography book, Luz: Seeing the Space Between Us, was published in 2022.

== Early life and education ==
Solís was born in Monterrey, Nuevo León, Mexico, in 1956. She moved to Chicago with her family as an infant and grew up in Pilsen. She earned a Bachelor of Fine Arts in photography from the University of Illinois Chicago.

In a 2022 interview, Solís recalled participating in protests against the Vietnam War during high school and joining political organizations at university. She described these experiences as influences on her interest in making art concerned with social justice.

== Career ==
=== Photography ===
From the 1970s through the early 1990s, Solís worked as a documentary photographer for neighborhood newspapers and Spanish-language publications, and as a freelancer for the Chicago Tribune. Her photographs include portraits of friends and images of LGBTQ marches in Chicago and Mexico City.

Solís also photographed writers associated with Chicago's poetry community, including Sandra Cisneros, Beatriz Badikian, and Marc Zimmerman. Her photographic archive includes portraits and records of sittings with these writers.

=== Visual art and education ===
Solís began painting in 1990. Her work has included assemblage, installation, printmaking, and mixed-media works on paper.

She taught photography at Latino Youth High School in Chicago. Her educational work has also included workshops for mothers and daughters through Mujeres Latinas en Acción. She has taught workshops and classes through the Museum of Contemporary Art and the Chicago Park District.

=== Luz: Seeing the Space Between Us ===
During the COVID-19 pandemic, Solís returned to photography after approximately two decades focused on painting and illustration. She initially photographed Pilsen during early-morning walks, later making portraits of neighbors and friends.

The resulting book, Luz: Seeing the Space Between Us, combined new photographs with archival images. Published by Flatlands Press in 2022, it included a foreword by art historian Deanna Ledezma.

== Exhibitions and collections ==
The institution now known as the National Museum of Mexican Art presented Solís's first solo exhibition in 1987. Its collection includes her photograph Appearance (Apariencia) (1996) and the work on paper Jugando a las guerritas, versión tres (Playing War, Version Three) (2008).

The Poetry Foundation presented Encuentros: Photographs of Chicago Poetry Communities, 1978–1994, curated by Oscar Arriola and Nicole Marroquin. In a January 2023 review for Newcity, Susan Aurinko discussed the exhibition as a record of Chicago's poetry community, drawing attention to the photographs and accompanying archival materials.

In 2023, Solís's photographs were included in Images on which to build, 1970s–1990s at the Leslie-Lohman Museum of Art in New York. Curated by Ariel Goldberg, the exhibition included photographs from her work in Chicago and Mexico City. Her photographs were also shown in the exhibition's 2024 presentation at the Chicago Cultural Center.

In August and September 2023, Co-Prosperity in Chicago presented Contigo, Diana Solís, a group exhibition curated by Nicole Marroquin and Deanna Ledezma that brought together Solís's photographs and works by other artists.

== Awards ==
Solís received a Make a Wave award from 3Arts in 2021 and a Latinx Artist Fellowship from the US Latinx Art Forum in 2023.
