= ConTextos =

Non-governmental organization

ConTextos is an educational NGO established in El Salvador and the US. The organization offers a teacher training program, school libraries, and a tablet-based writing program.

The organization, founded by students at Harvard Graduate School of Education in 2009, was originally named Learning Through Libraries (LTL) and later renamed ConTextos. The organization collaborates with local communities, private partner organizations such as Avianca and Lectorum, and governments.

The executive director of ConTextos, Debra Gittler, was named a 2013 Global Fellow by Echoing Green, an early-stage social sector investor. In 2014, ConTextos' work was featured on WBEZ, a public radio station in the Chicago area.
