= Chuck Schaden =

American broadcaster and historian

- Born: June 29, 1934 (age 92); Chicago, Illinois
- Presenting career
- Show: Those Were the Days
- Station: WDCB
- Time slot: 1:00 - 5:00 p.m. Saturday
- Country: United States

Charles Leroy "Chuck" Schaden (born June 29, 1934) is a Chicago-area broadcaster and historian who hosted the program Those Were the Days on local radio from 1970 to 2009. Schaden played recordings of classic old-time radio shows and reminisces with radio personalities about the early days of broadcasting. The program first aired on WNMP/WLTD in Evanston in 1970 and then moved to WNIB, Classical 97 in Chicago from 1975 to 2001, and since 2001 it has been heard on WDCB 90.9 FM, a public radio station in Glen Ellyn, Illinois.

Born in Chicago, Schaden is a former newspaper editor and marketing executive who turned his hobby of collecting radio shows into a vocation. For his efforts in preserving and documenting radio history he was inducted into the National Radio Hall of Fame in 1993, the first radio fan to receive this honor. He has often served as a consultant on topics related to broadcasting history, and he is a founding member of the Board of Directors of Chicago’s Museum of Broadcast Communications.

He was the editor and publisher of the magazine Nostalgia Digest from its inception in 1974 until his retirement from publishing in 2005. The magazine is now edited and published by Funny Valentine Press. He documented the history of Chicago's WBBM in WBBM Radio: Yesterday and Today (1988), and he also wrote The Cinnamon Bear Book (1987), Speaking of Radio: Chuck Schaden’s Conversations with the Stars of the Golden Age of Radio (2003) and Chuck Schaden's Radio Days (2019).

On October 9, 2006, he became the new host of the nationally syndicated When Radio Was! series, replacing Stan Freberg (who had hosted the show since 1995). His first show for When Radio Was! was "A Salute to Stan Freberg." Chuck stepped down as host of this series in October 2007, with XM Satellite Radio's Greg Bell taking over the program beginning with the broadcast of October 8.

Schaden stepped down as host of "Those Were The Days" in June 2009. When making the public announcement, Schaden explained that he wanted to spend more time with his family. On July 4, 2009, current host Steve Darnall took over as only the second host of the show. From 2016 to 2021, he hosted the monthly podcast "Chuck Schaden's Memory Lane," which focused on music from the 1930s, 40s, and 50s.

Schaden currently resides in Morton Grove, Illinois, where he lives in retirement, with his wife of 69-plus years, Ellen, until she died on December 8, 2025.

== See also ==
- List of old-time radio people
