= Ben Calhoun =

American journalist

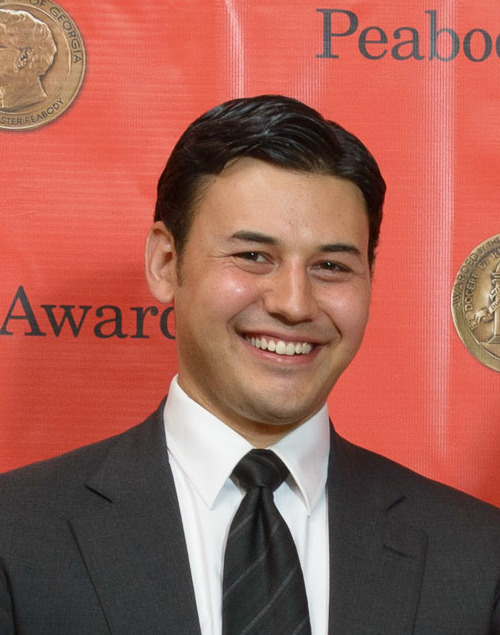
- Ben Calhoun at the 73rd Annual Peabody Awards
- Born: 1979; Milwaukee, Wisconsin, U.S.
- Education: Oberlin College
- Occupation: Radio Journalist
- Notable credit(s): This American Life, Serial, National Public Radio, Chicago Public Radio, Radiolab

Benjamin Chang Calhoun (born 1979) is an American radio reporter, producer, editor and programmer. He is currently the executive producer of The Daily -- the flagship news podcast of The New York Times. Before that, he spent more than a decade as a reporter, producer and editor for the public radio program This American Life and the podcast Serial.

Calhoun left This American Life from 2014 to 2017 to serve as Vice President of Content and Programming at WBEZ, the NPR affiliate in Chicago.

Prior to his work on This American Life, he spent eight years as a reporter and deputy news director at WBEZ, where he covered politics and did documentary work. His work has also aired on Morning Edition, All Things Considered, Day to Day, Marketplace, and WNYC's The Takeaway and Radiolab.

== Awards ==
Calhoun was an editor on the team at This American Life that won the inaugural Pulitzer Prize for audio journalism. The episode entitled "The Out Crowd" featured stories about the immigration policies of the first Trump administration.

He was a reporter and producer, on the show's 2013 landmark episodes about Harper High School. The two episodes told the stories of the students, families and faculty of Chicago high school struggling with chronic gun violence. The episodes went on to win numerous major awards; a Peabody Award, a Dupont Award, a Scripps-Howard Award, a Dart Award and a first place award from the Third Coast International Audio Festival.

Calhoun also received Third Coast International Audio Festival Award for his reporting on the Tea Party in 2010.

He won a James Beard Foundation Award in 2014 for his story about "artificial calamari," which became a fan favorite and an urban myth.

== Early life and education ==
Calhoun is originally from Milwaukee, Wisconsin. He earned a bachelor's degree in English in 2001 from Oberlin College in Oberlin, Ohio, where he was the station manager for WOBC-FM, the student-operated radio station.

== Early Professional career ==
Calhoun began his journalism career when he joined Chicago Public Radio as an unpaid intern during the summer of 2000. He was later hired full time, and was promoted from newsroom coordinator to deputy news director in 2003.

From 2004 until 2008, Calhoun helped direct election coverage for Chicago Public Radio. He appeared on episodes of the Week in Review on WTTW-TV's Chicago Tonight program, where he provided commentary on current political news.

In 2005, Calhoun was awarded a grant by the Illinois Humanities Council that allowed him to pursue his interests in documentary work. Additional support was provided by Chicago Public Radio, where he used the grant to direct, edit, and curate an exhibition of audio and photo documentary work entitled The Daily Meaning: Life Inside America's Service Industries that went on display at the Peace Museum on September 2, 2005. In 2006, the documentary was nominated for the Helen and Martin Schwarz Prize by the Illinois Humanities Council. Calhoun served as the executive producer for the documentary A New Generation of Veterans, which was awarded second place for "Beat Radio Documentary or Series" by the Illinois Associated Press.

In February 2006, Calhoun was named WBEZ-FM/Chicago Public Radio's political reporter.

Calhoun resigned from Chicago Public Radio in February 2009 to move to New York.

== Personal ==
Calhoun is married to The New York Times journalist Catrin Einhorn. Calhoun is half-Chinese through his mother.
