= West Town Academy =

Public high school in Chicago, Illinois

Coordinates: 41°53′27.9″N 87°42′10.1″W

Location
- 534 N Sacramento Blvd; Chicago, Cook County, Illinois 60612; United States

Information
- School type: Charter Public School
- Established: September 1998
- Founder: William Leavy
- Status: Open
- Oversight: Chicago Public Schools
- Dean: Kendall Holliday
- Principal: Diane Rodriguez
- Staff: 10
- Faculty: 8
- Grades: Secondary
- Age: 17 to 21
- Enrollment: 200
- Average class size: 25
- Hours in school day: 8:30 AM - 4:00 PM
- Campus type: urban
- Colours: Blue and White
- Athletics: Basketball, Flag Football, Volleyball, Bowling, Softball
- Athletics conference: Chicago Area Alternative Education League
- Team name: West Town Warriors
- Accreditation: Illinois State Board of Education
- Newspaper: West Town Times
- Communities served: West Side of Chicago
- Affiliation: Youth Connection Charter School and Alternative School Network
- Website: http://www.westtownacademy.org

West Town Academy is a part of Greater West Town Community Development Project, a communitarian non-profit organization working toward development on the West Side of Chicago.

The school originated as a GED program aimed at Chicago high school dropouts. It became a fully state-certified high school in 1998 and has been retrieving "disenrolled" minority students from the Chicago Public Schools system through its association as a campus of Youth Connection Charter School. It also operates as an independent high school through the enrollment of students who are wards of the court and the Illinois Department of Children and Family Services. This situation makes West Town Academy both a public and private school simultaneously.

The school and its parent agency have hosted many local, statewide and national politicians. Then newly elected state senator Barack Obama was the commencement speaker for the class of 2000. Chicago Mayor Richard M. Daley, Illinois governors Rod Blagojevich and Pat Quinn, and U.S. Secretary of the Treasury Timothy Geithner have all used it as a podium to make policy statements. Democratic presidential candidate Senator John Kerry and then candidate for the U.S. Senate from Illinois Obama held a campaign event in its original location during the 2004 campaign.

The school was founded by William Leavy, who is also director of its parent organization, The school moved to its new location, 534 N Sacramento, Chicago, IL, in June 2010.
