= WLUW =

Radio station at Loyola University Chicago

Coordinates: 42.001°N 87.660°W

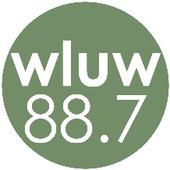

Chicago, Illinois; United States
- Broadcast area: Far Northside of Chicago and Evanston, Illinois
- Frequency: 88.7 MHz

Programming
- Format: College radio

Ownership
- Owner: Loyola University Chicago

History
- First air date: 1979
- Call sign meaning: Loyola University

Technical information
- Licensing authority: FCC
- Facility ID: 38939
- Class: A
- ERP: 100 watts
- HAAT: 70 meters (230 ft)

Links
- Public license information: Public file; LMS
- Website: wluw.org

WLUW (88.7 FM) is a college radio station owned and operated by Loyola University Chicago, serving the north side of Chicago, Illinois, as well as Skokie and Evanston.

== History ==
WLUW began broadcasting in 1979. The station was originally as "The Hitline", then "High Energy 88-7 FM" in the late 1980s, and then simply "Energy 88-7". In the mid-1990s the station changed radio formats to 88.7 Listener Supported Community Radio. Loyola University Chicago ceased funding WLUW in 2002, turning over operational control of the station to WBEZ. In 2008, Loyola resumed control of the station.

== See also ==
- Campus radio
- List of college radio stations in the United States
