= Association House High School =

High school in Chicago, Illinois, United States

Coordinates: 41.9016°N 87.7072°W

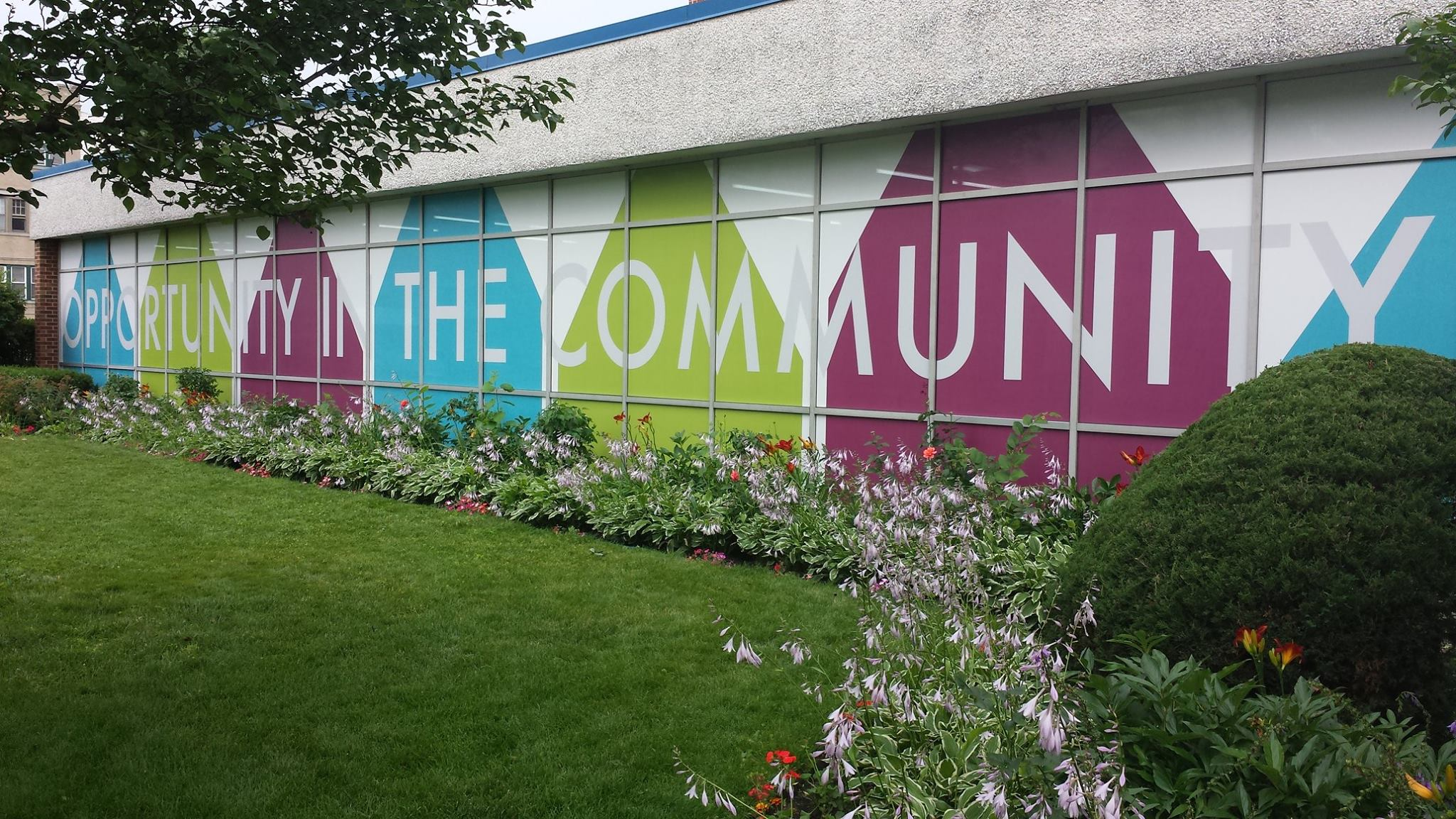
Association House High School in Humboldt Park

Association House High School is a high school located in Association House of Chicago in Humboldt Park neighborhood in Chicago, Illinois. Formally known as El Cuarto Año High School, Association House High School is a campus of the Youth Connection Charter School in Chicago and a member of the Alternative Schools Network. Association House High School has an enrollment of 155 youth, aged 16–21.

The site formerly housed, Walther Memorial Hospital, which was in operation until 1987.

== History ==
Association House of Chicago originally began a Graduate Educational Development program to help individuals in the community who were unable to complete their education in a traditional setting back in the early 1980s. This program continued as the only alternative education that AHC provided to the community until 1999 when AHC decided to begin an alternative high school named El Cuarto Año. El Cuarto Año (ECA) served teens and young adults 16–21 years old who had been dropped from other schools or were unable to complete their school work in a traditional setting. In the first year, El Cuarto Año enrolled 75 students.

ECA changed its name in the 2015-2016 school year to be more inclusive to all of its students. The demographics had become more diverse since ECA first opened and to represent that the name was changed to Association House High School.
