= Dr. Pedro Albizu Campos High School =

High school in Chicago, Illinois, United States

Coordinates: 41°54′9.6″N 87°41′47.4″W

Location
- 2739 West Division Street; Chicago, Illinois 60622; United States

Information
- Former name: La Escuelita Puertorriqueña
- Established: 1972; 54 years ago
- Website: https://pachs-chicago.org/

Dr. Pedro Albizu Campos Puerto Rican High School (PACHS) is an alternative high school located in the Humboldt Park neighborhood on the Paseo Boricua in Chicago, Illinois, United States. It is named for Puerto Rican nationalist Pedro Albizu Campos, and was founded in 1972 as La Escuelita Puertorriqueña, originally in the basement of a Chicago church. The school is NALSAS accredited, a founding member of the Alternative Schools Network, and a campus of the Youth Connection Charter School in Chicago. PACHS celebrated its 50th anniversary in October 2022.

== School history ==
PACHS was founded by concerned community members in response to a March 1971 study that cited a 71.2% high school dropout rate for Puerto Rican youth. Originally named "La Escuelita Puertorriqueña", the school began in the basement of a Chicago church as a response to alleged Eurocentric curricula and purported negative pedagogical conditions faced by Puerto Ricans in public schools. By 1974, the school had been moved two miles northeast of [Paseo Boricua], where it remained until moving to its current location on Division.

The Lolita Lebrón Family Learning Center is a satellite program of the high school which integrates educational activities for young adults and children, provides daycare services, and offer classes in women's health and wellness at the high school. In March, 2011, PACHS inaugurated a rooftop greenhouse as an extension of its science lab in order to teach students about urban agriculture and help address the high rates of obesity and diabetes in Humboldt Park, which may explain its 2006 designation as an urban "Food Desert".

== See also ==
- Puerto Ricans in Chicago
