= Latino Youth High School =

High school in Chicago, Illinois

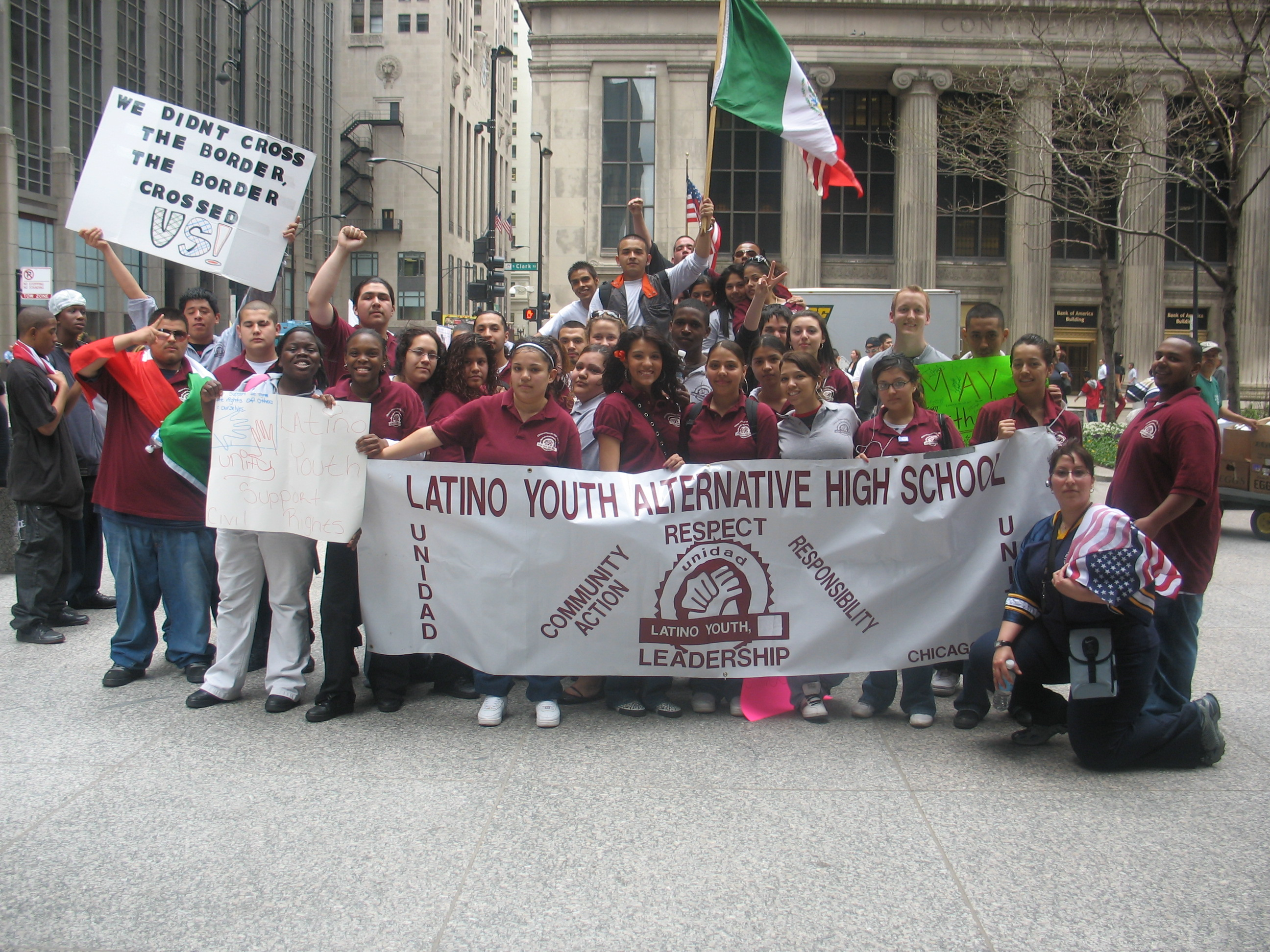
- Students and staff of Latino Youth High School

Location
- 2001 S. California Ave. Chicago, Illinois 60608; United States; 41.854651°N 87.695318°W

Information
- Type: Public charter high school (Options)
- Motto: Respect, Integrity, Scholarship, and Engagement
- Established: 1974
- School district: Chicago Public Schools
- Director: James J. Hurlburt
- Faculty: 9.0 FTE
- Grades: 9–12
- Enrollment: 174 (2024–25)
- Student to teacher ratio: 19.33
- Colors: Maroon and tan
- Mascot: Owl and Gecko
- Nickname: LYHS
- Website: lyhs.org

Latino Youth High School (LYHS), formally listed in state and federal education records as YCCS-Latino Youth Alternative HS, is a public charter high school on the Southwest Side of Chicago, Illinois. Chicago Public Schools (CPS) classifies the school as an Options school, the district's designation for schools providing nontraditional pathways to high school graduation. The school is operated through the education division of the Pilsen Wellness Center and is an affiliated campus of Youth Connection Charter School (YCCS).

Founded in 1974, Latino Youth grew out of Latino community activism in Chicago's Pilsen and Little Village neighborhoods. Its early educational model emphasized a small-school environment, individualized relationships between teachers and students, Latino history and culture, arts education, and student-produced writing and media. Writer Sandra Cisneros taught at the school from 1978 to 1980 and worked with student literary publications during the period in which her early writing career was developing.

Latino Youth became affiliated with YCCS during the 1990s and underwent a major organizational transition during 2005–2006, when its operations became associated with the organization now known as Pilsen Wellness Center and the school moved from Marshall Boulevard to its present California Avenue location. Its teachers unionized in 2013, negotiated their first collective bargaining agreement in 2014, and participated in the wider wave of Chicago charter-school labor actions in 2019.

== History ==
=== Origins and early years ===
Latino Youth High School developed during a period of extensive Mexican-American and Puerto Rican community organizing in Chicago during the late 1960s and 1970s. Education was a major focus of activism in Pilsen, where residents organized for greater access to secondary and higher education, bilingual and culturally relevant instruction, and greater community participation in neighborhood schools.

These efforts included the community campaign that led to the establishment of Benito Juarez Community Academy as well as the creation of smaller community-based schools. The University of Illinois Chicago identifies Latino Youth High School and Rafael Cancel Miranda High School among the educational institutions developed through this movement. These schools emphasized Latin American language, history, culture, and contemporary social issues.

WTTW dates the establishment of Latino Youth to 1974 and identifies community activists, including future Chicago alderman Daniel Solis, as participants in opening the community-based high school.

The organization from which the school developed was originally associated with the Latino Youth Drug Intervention Program. Latino Youth, Inc. subsequently expanded its work into education, counseling, social services, child welfare, youth development, employment assistance, and related programs. Its high school was intended to provide young people who had left conventional schools with another opportunity to complete a high school diploma.

Although 1974 is conventionally used as the school's founding year, a 1979 interview preserved by the Media Burn Archive records a Latino Youth teacher recalling that the high school itself began operating in October 1975.

One of the earliest surviving audiovisual records of Latino Youth is a 33-minute documentary profile produced in 1976 and preserved by the Media Burn Archive as part of the Community TV Network collection. The documentary includes interviews with students and staff, including program director Mike Vasquez, staff member Joanne Fuentes, outreach coordinator Eli Grenados, and art instructor Ruth Bowman.

Vasquez described the school as having two related purposes: serving young people in the community and demonstrating to the larger educational system the usefulness of different approaches to education. Grenados discussed the importance of including Latino culture and history in the curriculum.

In a 1979 interview, a Latino Youth teacher described the school as intentionally small in order to provide students with greater individual attention and closer relationships with educators. The teacher discussed the influence of Paulo Freire's Pedagogy of the Oppressed and described an effort to create a "community of learning" rather than reproduce the structure of a large conventional high school.

Among the people involved in the school's early development was educator and community activist Leonard Ramirez. The University of Illinois Chicago identifies Ramirez as one of the founders of Latino Youth High School. Ramirez later spent more than three decades directing UIC's Latin American Recruitment and Educational Services (LARES) program and remained involved in efforts to expand Latino access to higher education.

Daniel Solis was also a co-founder and early director of Latino Youth High School. WTTW reports that Solis recruited academics, artists, and other community members to work with young people through the school during its early years.

Labor activist and community organizer Rudy Lozano taught at Latino Youth in 1976 and incorporated culturally relevant education into his teaching. A 2019 account of Pilsen's community history also names Lozano among the activists who helped found the school.

=== Arts, writing, and student media ===
Arts, writing, photography, and media production formed part of Latino Youth's educational program from its early years.

Chicago photographer and artist Diana Solís taught a beginner photography workshop at Latino Youth High School in the mid-1970s. According to the Poetry Foundation, Solís became friends at Latino Youth with writer Sandra Cisneros, who later taught at the school.

The 1976 documentary about the school also records visual-arts instruction. Later historical material published through the University of Illinois Chicago describes artist Ruth Bauman as establishing an arts residency and studio space at Latino Youth. Artists associated with this work later participated in the formation of Pros Arts Studio, a Pilsen community arts organization established in 1978.

Sandra Cisneros returned to Chicago after completing an MFA at the Iowa Writers' Workshop in 1978 and worked at Latino Youth High School from 1978 to 1980.

Materials preserved in the Sandra Cisneros Papers at Texas State University's Wittliff Collections document her work with Latino Youth students. The collection includes poems prepared for students, nine issues of the school's YAP newsletter from 1978 and 1980, and student literary journals including I'm Somebody Too and Un Verno.

A chronology associated with the collection describes Cisneros as teaching Spanish, English, and creative writing, coordinating the school newspaper and student writing publications, and serving for a period as interim director in 1980.

A 2024 study published in American Studies examines Cisneros's work with students at Latino Youth as part of her early literary and community activism in Chicago.

Media production also formed an important part of the school's early program. Recordings preserved by the Media Burn Archive include bilingual student newscasts made in 1975. Students reported in both English and Spanish on international events as well as local issues, including controversy surrounding the leadership of Benito Juarez High School.

Students continued to make documentary and interview-based productions concerning neighborhood and political issues. Surviving recordings include material on Puerto Rican political activism, Chicago Board of Education protests, neighborhood gangs, and students' experiences leaving and returning to school.

In 1981, Latino Youth students produced Gang Wars #2, which included interviews with current and former members of Chicago street gangs and footage from Pilsen, Little Village, and surrounding neighborhoods.

Also in 1981, students working through the Community TV Network helped produce La Esperanza, a documentary about the creation of the A La Esperanza mural at Benito Juarez High School. The film later became part of exhibitions examining the history of community arts and education in Pilsen, including the National Museum of Mexican Art's 2019 exhibition 40 años a la esperanza and programming at the University of Illinois Chicago's Gallery 400.

=== Marshall Boulevard ===
In 1985, Latino Youth acquired an abandoned property at 2200 S. Marshall Boulevard, reportedly donated by the bank that owned it, and the building became a long-term home for the high school and other Latino Youth programs.

State and federal records from the 1990s document Latino Youth operating at the Marshall Boulevard address and providing educational and social-service programming to young people and families.

By the early 2000s, Latino Youth, Inc. had developed into a broader community organization encompassing education, child welfare, and social services. A 2004 scholarly case study described the organization as serving approximately 2,000 children and their families in Pilsen, Little Village, and South Lawndale.

In 2005, The Chicago Reporter profiled students who had returned to secondary education through Latino Youth after experiencing difficulty re-enrolling in conventional high schools. Students interviewed for the article described receiving more individual attention and greater access to teachers at Latino Youth than at their previous schools.

=== Charter affiliation and Pilsen Wellness Center transition ===
Latino Youth became affiliated with Youth Connection Charter School during the early years of Chicago's charter-school system. In a 1997 account of efforts to establish another school for students who had left traditional high schools, The Chicago Reporter described Latino Youth as operating under a subcontract with Youth Connection Charter School by November of that year.

The school's organizational relationship with the Pilsen-Little Village Community Mental Health Center, later renamed the Pilsen Wellness Center, changed substantially during 2005 and 2006.

A 2008 management audit by the Illinois Office of the Auditor General states that Pilsen-Little Village Community Mental Health Center assumed control of Latino Youth High School in July 2005.

Pilsen disputed aspects of the auditor's characterization of this transition. In its response, the organization maintained that Latino Youth, Inc. remained a separate legal entity during the period, that Latino Youth itself was party to the original leases for the California Avenue property, and that Pilsen did not directly assume various Latino Youth contracts until December 2006.

In October 2005, the school building at 2200 S. Marshall Boulevard was cited for multiple building-code violations and was required to be vacated. An agreement for space at 2001 S. California Avenue was reached in December 2005, and Latino Youth moved to the California Avenue location in January 2006. The former Marshall Boulevard property was subsequently sold in June 2006.

The Pilsen-Little Village Community Mental Health Center changed its name to the Pilsen Wellness Center in 2008. The organization provides behavioral-health, substance-use treatment, youth, and other human-services programming in addition to operating Latino Youth High School through its education division.

CPS later classified schools such as Latino Youth as Options schools, replacing "alternative" as the district's general contemporary terminology for schools providing nontraditional pathways to graduation.

In 2018, Latino Youth received a Level 1 rating under the former CPS School Quality Rating Policy (SQRP). CPS subsequently discontinued the SQRP rating system; Level 1 is therefore a historical rating rather than a current designation.

== Educational model ==
Latino Youth was established as a small, community-based school for young people who had left or been excluded from conventional high schools. Historical accounts of the school's early years describe an educational model emphasizing individual attention, close relationships between students and teachers, culturally relevant instruction, and a smaller setting than Chicago's large comprehensive high schools.

The school's educational model was examined in a 1998 article by Todd DeStigter in the National Council of Teachers of English journal English Education. DeStigter described Latino Youth as enrolling approximately 80 students between the ages of 16 and 21, many of whom had previously dropped out of or been expelled from conventional Chicago public high schools. His research emphasized close and individualized relationships between teachers and students as a central characteristic of the school.

In January 1997, DeStigter, Latino Youth educators, and approximately a dozen preservice secondary English teachers from the University of Illinois Chicago established the Latino Youth/UIC Tutoring Project. UIC students worked at Latino Youth as tutors and teacher aides, primarily in English classes but also in social studies, performing arts, mathematics, and the school's computer lab. Their work included individual writing assistance, small-group instruction, and classroom teaching.

Independent reporting in 2005 documented similar features. Students interviewed by The Chicago Reporter described receiving substantially more individual attention and having greater access to teachers at Latino Youth than at their previous schools. The report also documented the school's role in helping students return to education after leaving conventional high schools and noted that Latino Youth provided on-site child care for students who were parents.

CPS currently classifies Latino Youth as a Charter Options School. CPS describes Options schools as serving students seeking nontraditional pathways to graduation, including students who need smaller educational settings, individualized support, accelerated credit accumulation, or nontraditional schedules.

== Labor relations ==
=== Unionization and first contract ===
A representation proceeding involving teachers employed by Pilsen Wellness Center at Latino Youth High School was filed with the National Labor Relations Board (NLRB) in October 2010. Following a representation dispute, teachers voted 10–1 in April 2013 for representation by the Chicago Alliance of Charter Teachers and Staff, IFT-AFT. The NLRB certified the union as their bargaining representative on May 1, 2013.

In 2014, teachers reached a tentative agreement with Pilsen Wellness Center on their first collective bargaining contract. According to The Chicago Reporter, the agreement included due-process protections, teacher participation in academic and social-emotional committees and evaluation procedures, and a step-and-lane salary schedule. The newspaper described the salary structure as the first of its kind in a Chicago charter-school teachers' union contract.

=== 2019 charter-school strike ===
Latino Youth participated in a broader wave of Chicago charter-school labor actions during the 2018–19 school year, following strikes at the Acero and Chicago International Charter School networks. In April 2019, Chicago Teachers Union members at Latino Youth and four other independently operated public schools voted to authorize coordinated strike action. Latino Youth educators began striking on May 2, alongside employees at two schools operated by Instituto del Progreso Latino.

Access to counseling was among the issues raised by Latino Youth teachers. During the strike, Chalkbeat reported teachers' statements that the school had a counselor, but that access depended on whether students had insurance accepted by Pilsen Wellness Center.

Latino Youth teachers suspended their strike after reaching an agreement with Pilsen Wellness Center on May 5 and returned to classrooms on May 6. According to a union statement reported by the Chicago Sun-Times, the agreement included commitments to additional mental-health support for students and culturally appropriate curricula.

== Programs and partnerships ==
In her 2018 memoir Becoming, Michelle Obama names Latino Youth among the organizations that hosted interns from Public Allies Chicago in the fall of 1993, during her leadership of the program.

Public Allies identifies José Rico as a member of its 1994 Chicago alumni class and states that he was placed at Latino Youth Alternative High School during his service. Rico subsequently worked as a Public Allies program manager under Obama.

Latino Youth has a longstanding relationship with the Alternative Schools Network, a Chicago nonprofit organization supporting community-based educational programs for young people using nontraditional educational models.

The school has also participated in programs serving youth in the care of the Illinois Department of Children and Family Services (DCFS). The Alternative Schools Network's Youth Scholars, Skills, Service (YS3) program, a collaboration with DCFS, provides educational advocacy, mentoring, life-skills, college-preparation, and transition support to older youth in foster care. Latino Youth is one of the program's participating school locations.

== Notable people ==
- Sandra Cisneros - American novelist, poet, and author of The House on Mango Street. Cisneros worked at Latino Youth High School from 1978 to 1980, teaching and working with student writing and literary publications. Her work with students at Latino Youth has subsequently been examined as part of her early literary and community activism.
- Daniel Solis - Chicago community organizer and former alderman of the city's 25th Ward. Solis was a co-founder and early director of Latino Youth High School.
- Diana Solís - Chicago-based photographer, visual artist, and educator. Solís taught photography at Latino Youth High School.
- Rudy Lozano - Chicago labor activist and community organizer. Lozano taught at Latino Youth High School in 1976, incorporating culturally relevant education into his teaching.
- José Rico - Educator and former science teacher at Latino Youth High School who later served as executive director of the White House Initiative on Educational Excellence for Hispanics.

== See also ==
- Alternative Schools Network
- Youth Connection Charter School
- Pilsen, Chicago
- South Lawndale, Chicago
- Hispanic and Latino Americans in Chicago
