= 1A (radio program) =

American radio talk show

- Genre: Talk radio
- Running time: Approx. 120 min.
- Country of origin: United States
- Language: English
- Home station: WAMU
- Syndicates: NPR
- Hosted by: Joshua Johnson (2017–2019); Jenn White (2020–)
- Produced by: Denise Couture; Gabe Bullard; Lindsay Foster Thomas; Danielle Knight; Marc Kilstein; Bianca Martin; Jonquilyn Hill; Avery Kleinman
- Executive producer: Rupert Allman
- Recording studio: Washington, D.C.
- Original release: January 2, 2017
- Audio format: Stereophonic
- Website: the1a.org
- Podcast: Podcast/RSS feed

1A is an American radio talk show produced by WAMU in Washington, D.C., and distributed nationally by NPR (National Public Radio). The show debuted on January 2, 2017, and airs on more than 340 NPR member stations in 35 states, Washington, D.C., and the U.S. Virgin Islands. It is also broadcast on SiriusXM channel 122 several times each weekday. Jenn White is the current host.

Journalist Joshua Johnson served as the program's host from 2017 to 2019, before leaving to join MSNBC. Following his departure, Todd Zwillich took over as interim host in January 2020, and was later succeeded by Sasha-Ann Simons in April. Celeste Headlee also served as an interim guest host. On May 7, 2020, WAMU announced Jenn White as the new permanent host of 1A, beginning in July.

== Format ==
1A is divided into two one-hour segments, each focusing on a topic for the hour, with one or more guests who are authorities on that topic. Most often, it is an issue in the news, but occasionally, it might deal with pop culture and entertainment. 1A invites listeners to share their opinions and comments via texts and Twitter, which the host will read. The show rarely takes phone calls, although it sometimes asks in advance for vocal comments via a voice app. At the end of each week, the show presents "The Friday News Roundup". Usually, three guest journalists are invited to participate in a review of that week's major news stories. The first hour covers domestic news, and the second hour covers international stories. Several stations air a one-hour curated version of the program, produced daily, intended for broadcast in an afternoon or evening time slot.

The show debuted on 169 stations in January 2017, and by March of that year, it had expanded to over 200 stations.

The program's title refers to the First Amendment to the United States Constitution.

== Hosts ==
Former host Joshua Johnson is a native of West Palm Beach, Florida. He graduated from the University of Miami and worked for WLRN and the Miami Herald between 2004 and 2010. From 2010 to 2016, he was morning news host of KQED in San Francisco, a position he left to develop a radio project series entitled Truth Be Told, of which four episodes were broadcast nationally. He substituted for Diane Rehm for two days on her talk show in September 2016, and in November, Rehm announced that Johnson would be taking over her time slot. On November 22, Johnson announced his departure at the end of 2019 to host a show on MSNBC.

Todd Zwillich served as interim host from January through the end of March 2020, leaving the program to join Vice News. He was succeeded as interim host by Sasha-Ann Simons, who has been "reporting on issues of race, identity, and economic mobility for WAMU" since 2017.

On May 7, 2020, it was announced that Jennifer White would take over as permanent host of the program beginning in July.
