= Wayne Messmer =

American broadcaster and writer

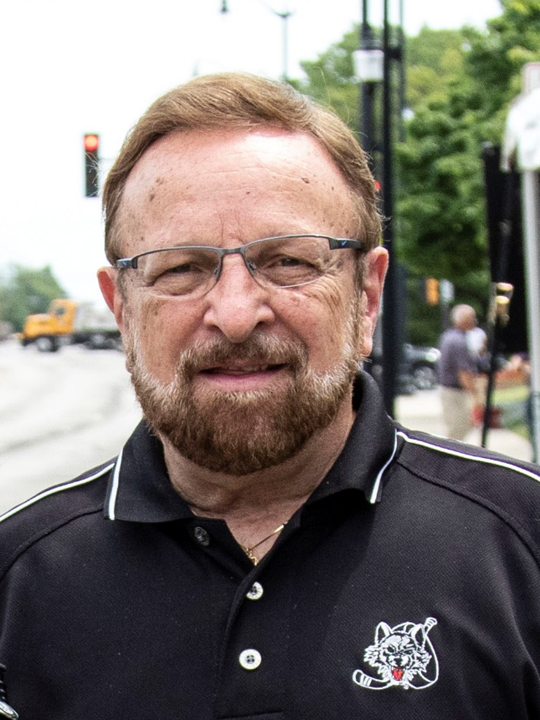
- Wayne Messmer at 2022 Skokie Independence Day Parade
- Born: July 19, 1950 (age 75); Chicago, Illinois
- Occupations: Sports announcer Singer

Wayne P. Messmer (born July 19, 1950, in Chicago, IL) is a professional speaker, singer, broadcaster, author and actor. He is a professional member of SAG/AFTRA and the National Speakers Association. He was the long-time public address announcer for the Chicago Cubs. He sings "The Star-Spangled Banner" before many Cubs games, as well as prior to all Chicago Wolves American Hockey League games. Messmer is part owner of the Chicago Wolves. He is a member of Phi Mu Alpha Sinfonia, the national fraternity for men in music.

In the mid-1980s, Messmer was the newscaster/sidekick on WYTZ (Z-95) Radio's "Barsky Morning Show. He also was heard as the mid-day news anchor on WLS 890 AM. Since November 2011, he has hosted a jazz radio program Sunday evenings on 90.9fm WDCB Public Radio, the Wayne Messmer Radio Show.

For many years, he also sang for the Chicago Blackhawks, Chicago White Sox, Chicago Bears and Chicago Sting. In January, 1991, when Messmer sang at the NHL All-Star Game at Chicago Stadium, he was nearly drowned out by cheers from the sellout crowd, mainly in support of the U.S. troops that had entered the Gulf War just days prior. Messmer also frequently performs the Anthem with his wife Kathleen. Messmer also sang at the 2016 World Series at Wrigley Field between the Cleveland Indians and the Chicago Cubs.

Messmer's performance of the Anthem has always concluded with his trademark flourish on the final word "Brave" in which he concludes on the dominant note (5th). This trademark ending has frequently been copied by other singers.

On April 9, 1994, Messmer was shot in the throat outside a Near West Side, Chicago restaurant. He survived the incident and after months of therapy continued his career as a singer and announcer. However, this incident prevented him from being able to sing the anthem for the final six Blackhawks home games at Chicago Stadium before its closing. A recording of Messmer singing was used instead for these games.

On October 14, 1994, he sang the national anthem at the Rosemont Horizon (now Allstate Arena) introducing the Chicago Wolves and the IHL to Chicago. It was his first public performance since being shot. However, he was fired by the Blackhawks for working for another team, despite the fact that the Blackhawks were not playing due to the NHL's lockout. The Blackhawks would allow him to sing the anthem one last time at the Hawks' first home game at United Center on January 25, 1995.

On July 7, 2024, he sang The Star-Spangled Banner before the NASCAR Cup Series race at the Chicago street race.

Academically, he has earned degrees from Illinois Wesleyan University (B.M.E.), Loyola University Chicago (M.Ed.) and LaSalle University (Ph.D.)

Messmer is also a Certified Speaking Professional, as recognized by the National Speakers Association, delivering a keynote message of courage and conviction entitled "The Spirit of a Champion," drawn from his own personal life story.

== Side projects ==
Messmer continues to frequently perform as a singer with orchestras and concert bands. He is still regularly heard at major sporting events. As a recording artist, his 2012 album So Lucky To Be Loving You features piano legend Judy Roberts as the accompanist. He also hosts a show on Sunday nights on 90.9 FM WDCB where he plays standards.

He is the co-founder and co-owner of Wayne Messmer & Associates, LLC, a financial services firm specializing in personal and family retirement advisement. Messmer presents financial dinner and workshops throughout the year in the Chicago area.

Messmer appeared in the 1992 film The Babe as the New York Yankees radio announcer.
