= Worldview (radio show) =

Radio program on WBEZ

- Genre: Talk radio
- Running time: ca. 50 min.
- Country of origin: United States
- Language: English
- Home station: WBEZ
- Syndicates: WBEQ
- Hosted by: Jerome McDonnell
- Created by: Jerome McDonnell
- Produced by: Steve Bynum; Julian Hayda
- Recording studio: Chicago, Illinois
- Original release: 1994 – 2019
- Audio format: Stereophonic
- Website: Worldview

Worldview was WBEZ's weekdaily global issues talk radio show, hosted by Jerome McDonnell. The show featured long-form interviews about how race, ethnicity, gender, identity, the environment, religion, politics, and economics drive and shape the news. It also brought in experts to discuss international news from a local perspective, and draws local connections. The show heavily featured arts, activism, and social movements in Chicago.

The show had several regular series, including the Thursday "Global Activism" segment in which Midwesterners involved in international advocacy are interviewed. On Fridays, the show usually featured suggestions for global-themed events in Chicago, and film reviews from Milos Stehlik, director and founder of Facets Multi-Media.

Notable guests included President Jimmy Carter, the 14th Dalai Lama, UN Secretary-General Kofi Annan, United States Secretary of State Condoleezza Rice, Nobel Prize Winner Muhammad Yunus, Canadian Foreign Minister and journalist Chrystia Freeland, Activists Oscar López Rivera, Dallas Goldtooth, United States Secretary of Commerce Penny Pritzker, Academics M. Cherif Bassiouni, Rashid Khalidi, Arnold Gundersen, Reza Aslan, Juan Cole, Stephen Walt, Timothy Garton Ash, Timothy Snyder, Journalists Anne Applebaum, Masha Gessen, Franklin Foer, Steve Clemons, Yasmin Nair, Glenn Greenwald, Jeremy Scahill, Actor Kevin Spacey, Musician Issa Boulos, Joseph Cirincione, Imam Abdul Malik Mujahid and more.

Worldview had several recurring local partnerships, including with the Chicago Council on Global Affairs, the Chicago Community Trust, Chicago Cultural Alliance, Chicago Fair Trade, Facets Multi-Media, the Morton Arboretum, the Pozen Family Center for Human Rights at the University of Chicago, Chicago Sister Cities International, and more.

Worldview aired at noon, CT (UTC-6), Monday through Friday, until its demise in 2019.
