= WBEK (FM) =

WBEZ public radio station in Kankakee, Illinois

Coordinates: 41°09′39″N 87°52′30″W

Simulcasting WBEZ Chicago
- Kankakee, Illinois; United States
- Frequency: 91.1 MHz

Programming
- Format: Public radio
- Affiliations: NPR; American Public Media; Public Radio International

Ownership
- Owner: Chicago Public Media

History
- First air date: June 1, 1992 (as WTKC)
- Former call signs: WTKC (1990–2003); WKCC (2003–2016)

Technical information
- Licensing authority: FCC
- Facility ID: 33327
- Class: A
- ERP: 2,600 watts
- HAAT: 77.3 meters (254 ft)

Links
- Public license information: Public file; LMS
- Webcast: Listen live
- Website: wbez.org

WBEK (91.1 FM) is a public radio station licensed to Kankakee, Illinois, and owned by Chicago Public Media.

Formerly known as WKCC and owned by Kankakee Community College, the station aired a format consisting of classical music and public radio programs from NPR, American Public Media, and Public Radio International. WKCC also aired a variety of jazz and blues programs on weekends, some of which were locally produced.

WKCC ceased local broadcast operations on Friday evening, December 18, 2015, at the conclusion of a special, final episode of In a Mellow Tone, hosted by Willie Dixon, Jr. – on the occasion of his 400th show. Chicago Public Media announced that it would purchase ownership rights for the WKCC 91.1 FM broadcast license. WBEZ's programming is now simulcast on WKCC, extending WBEZ's reach to an additional audience of more than 200,000 potential listeners in Kankakee and Iroquois Counties.

Chicago Public Media's purchase of the station from Kankakee Community College was consummated on April 28, 2016, at a price of $250,000. On May 6, 2016, the station changed its call sign to WBEK.
