= Youth Connection Charter School =

Location
- 10 West 35th Street; Chicago, Illinois 60616; United States

Information
- Type: Public charter school
- Established: 1997
- School district: Chicago Public Schools
- Executive Director: Sheila Venson
- Grades: 9–12
- Age range: 16–21
- Enrollment: 2,291 (2025 renewal review)
- Campuses: 17
- Website: www.yccs.us

Youth Connection Charter School (YCCS) is a public, multi-campus charter school in Chicago, Illinois, serving students in grades 9–12 who are generally ages 16–21. It operates 17 campuses within Chicago Public Schools (CPS), primarily as part of the district's system of Options schools for students who are off track for graduation, have disengaged from school, or have left traditional high schools.

YCCS was established in 1997 as an umbrella charter for a group of existing community-based alternative education programs. YCCS brought independently operated programs under a common charter while allowing individual campuses to retain distinctive educational approaches and community ties. YCCS central administration establishes common policies, accountability measures, graduation requirements and instructional standards, while individual campuses are operated by community organizations or other educational providers.

In its 2025 charter-renewal review, CPS reported that YCCS operated 17 campuses serving 2,291 students. The Chicago Board of Education renewed the charter for four years, through June 30, 2029, with conditions.

== History ==
=== Origins and establishment ===
YCCS developed from Chicago's community-based alternative education system. Beginning in 1995, the Chicago School Reform Board began providing public funds to nonprofit organizations that operated dropout-recovery and alternative education programs. For an 18-month period beginning in February 1996, the board distributed about $9.2 million to 47 programs, many of which had already been serving students who had left conventional public high schools.

After Illinois enacted its charter-school law in 1996, CPS considered a charter structure as a way to provide continuing public funding and oversight for those programs. CPS staff developed an application for a single umbrella charter whose campuses could be operated through subcontracts with public, nonprofit or for-profit entities. The application was submitted and received a public hearing on July 21, 1997, and the School Reform Board approved the charter on July 23. The original charter agreement took effect on August 1, 1997, authorized a multi-campus school for students who had dropped out of high school, and allowed enrollment of up to 1,850 students in grades 9–12.

Richard Stephenson, a retired CPS administrator who had briefly served as interim superintendent, became the first president of the YCCS board; another retired CPS administrator, Robert Saddler, became vice president. The organization initially had an unusually decentralized governance structure because the participating schools were separately operated programs. Contemporary reporting described uncertainty during the first year about the respective responsibilities of the YCCS board, individual operators and CPS. Sheila Venson, previously a consultant with the Alternative Schools Network, became executive director during YCCS's first year.

In the 1998–99 school year, the Illinois State Board of Education reported that YCCS operated at 26 sites and enrolled 1,475 students. Students frequently enrolled after having been out of school for months or years; their average age was 17 and they had accumulated an average of nine high-school credits. The network's reported operating hours collectively ranged from 8 a.m. to 9 p.m., reflecting the varied schedules of its campuses.

=== Growth and development ===
Many YCCS campuses had histories that predated the charter itself. Education Week reported in 2013 that Dr. Pedro Albizu Campos Puerto Rican High School had opened in 1972 and CCA Academy in 1978. Before 1997, many of the programs that joined YCCS had operated through neighborhood organizations under individual agreements with CPS. Education Week reported that the campuses continued to retain local identities and instructional approaches while operating under common YCCS administrative and academic requirements.

YCCS expanded substantially during its first two decades. Its authorized enrollment increased to 3,200 with the 2002 renewal, to 4,004 by the 2012 renewal, and to 4,217 with the 2015 renewal. A 2017 amendment increased authorized capacity to 4,417. In 2013, Education Week described YCCS as a 22-school network enrolling approximately 4,000 students.

The network's expansion was accompanied by increased central academic and accountability requirements. By 2013, campuses continued to use their own strategies for student engagement and academic programming, but YCCS had established common procedures for enrollment, financial reporting, academic benchmarks, special education and minimum graduation requirements.

The relationship between YCCS and CPS has periodically included disagreements over accountability and campus performance. In 2012, CPS renewed YCCS for three years rather than the more typical five-year period while the district and YCCS negotiated performance requirements. At the same time, YCCS considered restructuring or closing two lower-performing campuses but delayed action while negotiations with CPS continued.

The number of campuses later declined. CPS approved consolidation of the Austin Career Education Center and YCCS-West campuses in 2022, and also consolidated the Jane Addams campus with Youth Connection Leadership Academy. Other campuses were renamed, relocated or removed during successive charter amendments. By the 2025 renewal review, YCCS operated 17 campuses with an authorized maximum enrollment of 3,927.

== Organization and educational model ==
=== Campus structure ===
YCCS is legally a single charter school, but its campuses have historically been operated by different community-based organizations and educational providers. Individual campuses have used different academic themes, career programs, community partnerships and support services, while YCCS establishes network-wide administrative policies, academic expectations and graduation standards.

The community-based structure has been a defining feature since the school's creation. Education Week reported that, as of 2013, individual schools largely retained their distinctive approaches to re-engaging students and their local governing structures, while YCCS imposed common requirements in areas including enrollment, finance, academic benchmarks, special education and graduation. CPS's 2025 renewal review similarly noted that many YCCS campuses had been embedded in their communities before joining the YCCS umbrella in 1997.

=== Re-engagement and multiple pathways ===
YCCS is part of the CPS Options system, which serves students for whom a traditional high-school model has not been successful. CPS describes Options students as tending to be older and off track for graduation, and as including students who have disengaged from school or previously dropped out. Research by the University of Chicago Education Lab on Chicago's Options-school sector, rather than YCCS alone, has found substantial variation in the academic and nonacademic barriers faced by Options students and has emphasized identifying individual needs and matching students with appropriate supports.

YCCS's academic policies provide multiple pathways for students to earn credit and demonstrate proficiency. In addition to conventional classroom courses, campuses may use dual enrollment or early-college courses, career and technical education, online or blended learning, project-based and interdisciplinary courses, internships, apprenticeships, work-study, service learning and other approved extended-learning experiences. Outside or nontraditional learning experiences must be tied to academic standards and approved by school staff.

=== Competency-based education ===
YCCS uses a competency-based framework for curriculum and graduation. Its student handbook states that beginning with the 2018 student cohort, students must demonstrate achievement of cross-curricular and content-area standards before receiving a diploma. Campuses develop their own curriculum maps, syllabi and instructional plans but are required to align courses and graduation standards with YCCS competencies.

The framework permits credit to be awarded through conventional courses based on instructional time, courses containing an equivalent amount of instructional content, applied or project-based learning, approved online curricula and assessments demonstrating mastery. The handbook also describes personalized learning plans for students completing extended-learning options.

=== College and career preparation ===
Postsecondary preparation became an increasingly explicit part of the YCCS model during the 2000s and 2010s. In 2010, the Charles Stewart Mott Foundation funded development of a YCCS Career Pathways Program designed to combine accelerated high-school completion with college credit, occupational credentials and career-focused training. By 2013, Education Week reported that most YCCS campuses had partnerships with postsecondary institutions that allowed students to earn college credit while completing high-school requirements.

YCCS has also experimented with blended and virtual instruction. The YCCS Virtual High School combined online coursework with required attendance at a learning center and offered flexible scheduling, counseling, mentoring, tutoring and work-study options. CPS later suspended the Virtual High School campus; successive charter amendments extended the suspension before the campus ceased to be part of the active network.

== Accountability and charter renewal ==
Because YCCS serves an Options population, CPS evaluates its campuses under the district's Options School Academic Accountability Policy rather than applying the same academic measures used for traditional schools. CPS states that conventional accountability measures do not adequately reflect the enrollment patterns and student population of Options schools.

During the 2025 renewal process, CPS rated YCCS as Meets Standards for academic performance, Exceeds Standards for financial performance, Approaching Standards for organizational performance, and Needs Improvement for inclusive programming and equitable systems. Fifteen of 17 campuses received a "Good Standing" Options accountability designation for the 2023–24 school year.

The review also identified shortcomings in services for students with disabilities and multilingual learners. CPS site visits rated special-education implementation as "Partially Evident" at nine campuses and "Not Evident" at eight. The Board of Education consequently renewed YCCS for four years with conditions requiring continuing improvement planning and monitoring in areas that can include academics, attendance, enrollment, discipline, services for diverse learners and English learners, school climate, staff licensure, parent concerns and finances.

== Campuses ==
As of 2026, YCCS lists 17 campuses in Chicago:

- Academy of Scholastic Achievement
- ASPIRA Antonia Pantoja High School
- Association House High School
- CCA Academy
- Chatham Academy High School
- Community Youth Development Institute High School
- Dr. Pedro Albizu Campos High School
- Innovations High School
- Latino Youth High School
- McKinley Lakeside Leadership Academy
- Olive-Harvey Middle College High School
- Progressive Leadership Academy
- Sullivan House High School
- Truman Middle College High School
- West Town Academy
- YCCS-West
- Youth Connection Leadership Academy

== Governance ==
YCCS is governed by a nonprofit board of directors. For the 2026–27 school year, Angela Gibson is board president and Sheila Venson serves as executive director.

== See also ==
- Chicago Public Schools
- Charter schools in the United States
- Alternative school
