= Joshua Johnson (journalist) =

American journalist and radio host (born 1980)

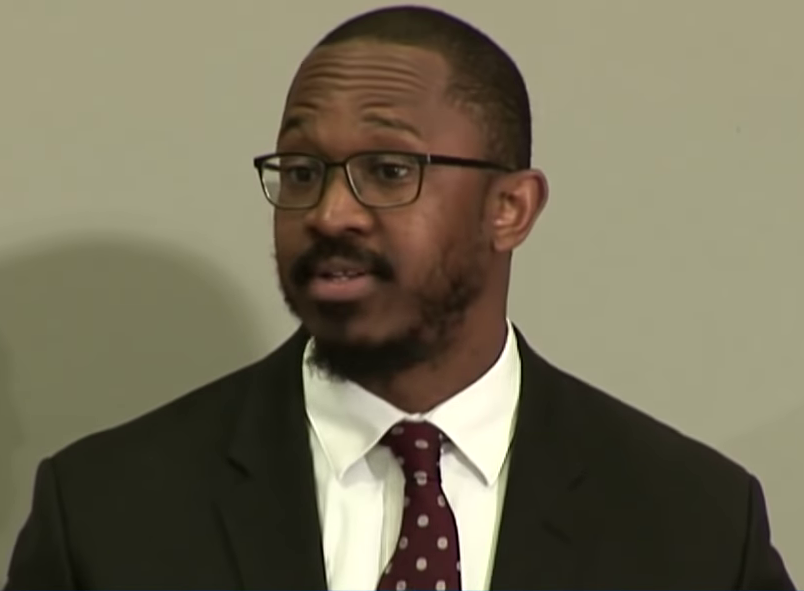
- Johnson in 2018
- Born: March 22, 1980 (age 46); West Palm Beach, Florida, U.S.
- Education: University of Miami
- Occupation: Journalist
- Employers: WAMU (2017–2019); NBC News (2019–2022); The Onion (2024–present)
- Joshua Johnson's voice Johnson introducing himself and a panel at the United States Institute of Peace; Recorded 2018

Joshua Johnson (born March 22, 1980) is an American journalist. He is the former host of 1A, which is produced by WAMU and nationally distributed by NPR. In 2019, he joined MSNBC and hosted The Week with Joshua Johnson; he later hosted Now Tonight with Joshua Johnson on NBC News Now. Since 2024, he has appeared in videos for The Onion, a satire news organization.

== Early life ==
Johnson was born and raised in West Palm Beach, Florida, the only son of a public school teacher and a Vietnam veteran. He became interested in journalism as a child, inspired by African American journalists such as Ed Bradley, Bernard Shaw, and Dwight Lauderdale.

== Career ==
Johnson graduated from the University of Miami and began his career in public radio working for a collaborative project between WLRN and the Miami Herald from 2004 to 2010.

In 2010, Johnson relocated to San Francisco to work for KQED, an NPR affiliate, where he served as morning newscaster until early 2016. In 2016, he hosted the radio series Truth Be Told, produced by KQED and distributed by Public Radio International. Truth Be Told addressed race-related issues in America, with four episodes aired nationwide. He was also a substitute host of KQED's Forum and taught courses in podcasting at the UC Berkeley Graduate School of Journalism. In September 2016, he guest-hosted The Diane Rehm Show for two days, and in November, Rehm announced Johnson would be taking over her time slot.

Johnson served as the host of 1A, which was distributed by NPR, from 2017 through 2019. In late 2019, he announced that he would be leaving 1A on December 20 to become an anchor for MSNBC in 2020.

In November 2022, Johnson left Now Tonight on NBC News Now. Since 2024, he has appeared in the Onion News Network as anchor Dwight Richmond.

== Personal life ==
Johnson declines to discuss his own opinions, and says he has been called both conservative and liberal.

Johnson is a member of the National Association of Black Journalists and the National Lesbian and Gay Journalists Association.
