= WDCB =

Jazz music public radio station in Glen Ellyn–Chicago, Illinois

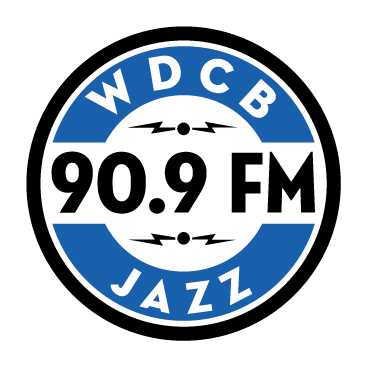
- Glen Ellyn, Illinois; United States
- Broadcast area: Chicago metropolitan area
- Frequency: 90.9 MHz (HD Radio)

Programming
- Format: Jazz, variety
- Affiliations: Public Radio Exchange (PRX)

Ownership
- Owner: College of DuPage; (College of DuPage, District 502)

History
- First air date: July 5, 1977; 49 years ago
- Call sign meaning: "DuPage Community Broadcasting"

Technical information
- Licensing authority: FCC
- Facility ID: 12281
- Class: A
- ERP: 5,000 watts
- HAAT: 91 meters (299 ft)
- Transmitter coordinates: 41°50′36.1″N 88°5′0.2″W
- Repeater: 90.7 WRTE (Chicago)

Links
- Public license information: Public file; LMS
- Webcast: Listen live
- Website: wdcb.org

WDCB (90.9 MHz) is a non-commercial public FM radio station licensed to Glen Ellyn, Illinois, and serving the Chicago metropolitan area. Known to listeners as "Chicago's Home for Jazz," WDCB airs more than 130 hours of jazz programming per week and is the only major radio station serving jazz and blues to the entire Chicagoland radio market. While financially self supporting and professionally staffed, WDCB is owned by the College of DuPage. Most shows are live and locally-hosted. WDCB is listener-supported and seeks donations on the air and on its website. Funding also comes from grants and corporate sponsorships. The studios are on Fawell Boulevard on the DuPage campus.

WDCB has an effective radiated power (ERP) of 5,000 watts. The transmitter is off Fawell Boulevard at Briarcliff Boulevard in Wheaton. Programming can be heard on CAN TV channel 42 in Chicago. WDCB's programming is also simulcast on WRTE 90.7 FM on Chicago's west side.

== History ==
=== Early years ===
WDCB began broadcasting July 5, 1977. It was originally a part-time station, sharing time on the frequency with WEPS. The station's call sign stood for "DuPage Community Broadcasting".

In its early years, the station aired classical music, jazz and folk music, College of DuPage educational courses, community affairs, and entertainment programming. The station began full-time operations in October 1987, after an agreement was reached for WEPS to move to a new frequency. Throughout the 1980s, WDCB was also used on the Cablevision of Downers Grove's Local/Public Access Channel.

=== Jazz music ===
By the late 1980s, mainstream jazz had become the station's primary format. While jazz remains its focus, WDCB plays a diverse variety of musical genres, including blues, roots rock, folk, big band, Afro-Cuban jazz, and Brazilian music, along with old-time radio shows.

Educational courses continued to air on the station until 2001. Classical Confab aired Sundays until late 2005.

WDCB is also the home of Those Were The Days, the long-running old-time radio program that had originally been hosted by Chuck Schaden. In 2009, Steve Darnall took over as the second host of the show. The show was co-hosted from February 2001 to October 2022 by Ken Alexander, who died on November 2, 2022.

As the result of a 2016 agreement with Chicago Public Media, WDCB's programming is now also heard on WRTE 90.7 FM, from a low power 6-watt signal located on Chicago's near-west side. While WDCB's primary 90.9 FM signal does reach all of Chicago, the 90.7 FM signal offers better reception for some WDCB listeners on the west side of Chicago, as well as Chicago's near-north and near-south side neighborhoods.

== Programming ==
WDCB broadcasts more than 130 hours of jazz every week. From 2000 to 2022, John Russell Ghrist hosted the Saturday afternoon big band program Midwest Ballroom. Steve Darnall hosts the long running old-time radio program Those Were The Days, which airs Saturday afternoons. WDCB's extensive blues lineup includes an 11-hour block of blues every Saturday night, led off by Leslie Keros's "Mood Indigo" program and ending with Steve Cushing's historical, all-night, blues program Blues Before Sunrise. Chicago blues radio veteran Tom Marker began hosting blues on WDCB in 2015 and remained with WDCB until his retirement in 2025 . In 2015, WDCB became the new broadcast home of former XM host Michelle Sammartino's (now Michelle Zeto) program, Jammin' Jazz: Jazz for the New Generation. Local celebrity Wayne Messmer also hosts a vocal jazz show on Sunday nights. In 2017, WDCB added prominent Chicago jazz singer Dee Alexander to its on-air lineup. In 2026 noted Chicago guitarist Bobby Broom's "Jazz Spectrum" program was also added to the WDCB lineup.

In addition to its predominantly live and locally hosted programming, WDCB also airs a number of nationally syndicated music programs, including NPR's "Jazz Night in America" as well as independent programs including "American Routes," "Night Lights," "Blues From the Red Rooster Lounge," and "The Grateful Dead Radio Hour." WDCB was also home to The Folk Sampler until it ended its run in Summer 2018.

== Staff ==
The station manager of WDCB is Dan Bindert. The music director is Paul Abella. The programming operations coordinator is longtime Chicago broadcaster, Scott Childers. WDCB is not student-operated, though COD students work at the station.

WDCB's stable of on-air personalities includes Bruce Oscar, Paul Abella, Rene Avila, Orbert Davis, Dee Alexander, Bill O'Connell, and Marshall Vente, all of whom are prominent Chicago-based jazz musicians, along with longtime hosts Leslie Keros, Jay Greene, Jeanne Franks, Bob Signorelli, Dona Mullen, Greg Easterling and Al Carter-Bey. The daily lineup of Abella (mornings), Keros (middays), and Oscar (afternoons) has been intact since late 2019, after the retirement of long-time jazz personality Barry Winograd (who still hosts his early-jazz show When Jazz Was King on Saturday mornings). Oscar has been with WDCB since 1992. Notable retired WDCB hosts include longtime overnight host Matthew Hermes as well as the late John Burnett ("The British-American Buddy") and Latin Jazz broadcasting legend Victor Parra.

== See also ==
- List of jazz radio stations in the United States
- List of college radio stations in the United States
