= National Museum of Mexican Art =

Art museum in Chicago, Illinois, US

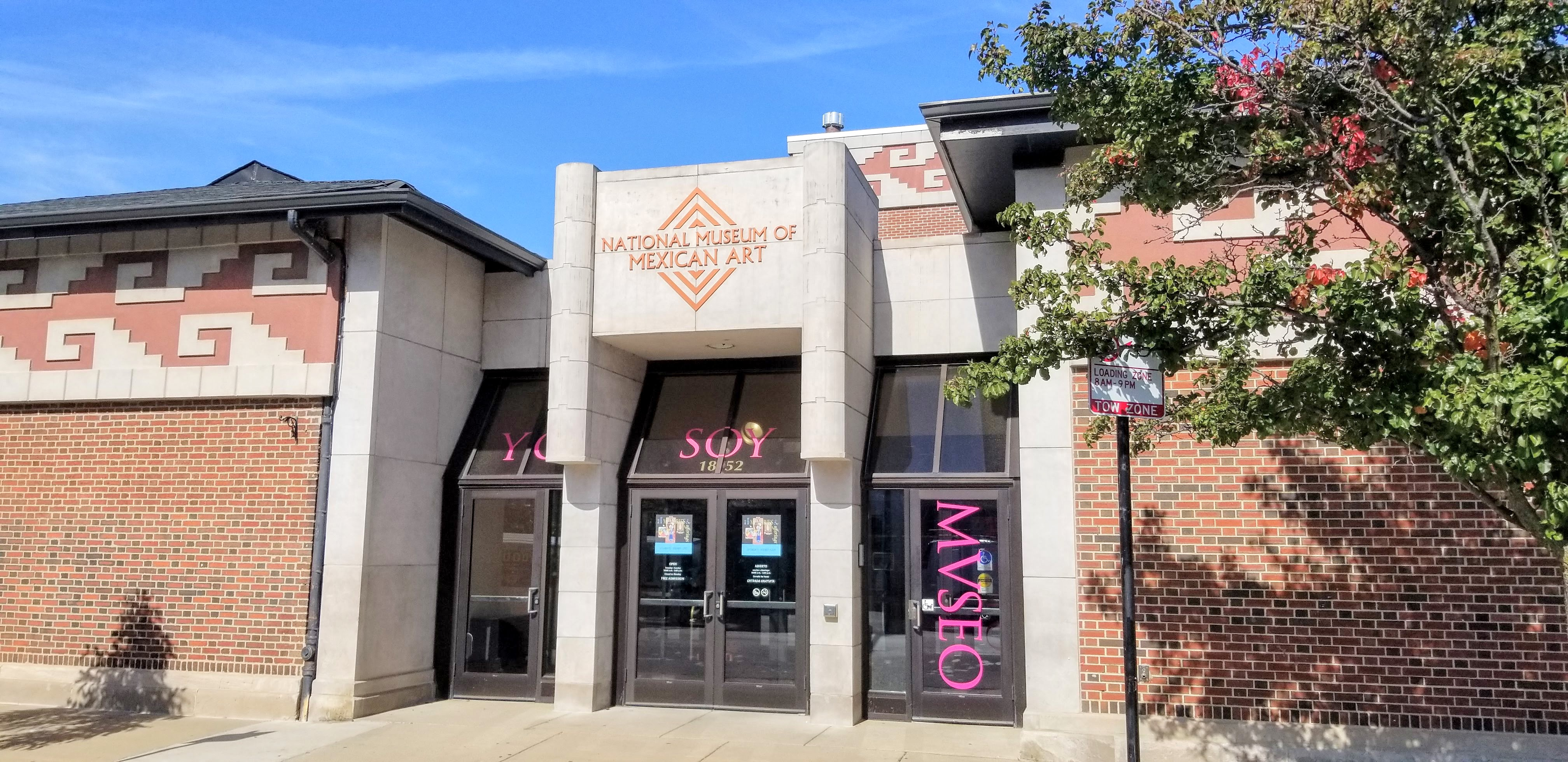
- Museum entrance.
- Established: 1982
- Location: 1852 W. 19th Street; Chicago, IL 60608 US
- Coordinates: 41.856162°N 87.672948°W
- Type: Art Museum
- Founder: Carlos Tortelero
- President: Carlos Tortelero
- Public transit access: CTA Bus routes: Routes 9 and 50 CTA 'L' (Pink Line): Damen or 18th St.
- Website: nationalmuseumofmexicanart.org

The National Museum of Mexican Art (NMMA) is a museum featuring Mexican and Chicano art and culture. It is located in Harrison Park in the Pilsen neighborhood of Chicago, Illinois. The museum was founded in 1982 by Carlos Tortolero and opened on March 27, 1987. It is the only Latino museum accredited by the American Alliance of Museums. The museum describes itself as the largest Latino cultural institution in America.

Admission to the museum is free.

== History ==
Carlos Tortolero and a group of Mexican-American teachers first formed the Mexican Fine Arts Center Museum in 1982. In 1986, the museum signed an agreement to use a Chicago Park District building. The museum building in Harrison Park opened in 1987 and was expanded in 2001. The design on the façade of the building was inspired by the friezes of Mitla in Oaxaca, Mexico.

The name of the museum was changed to the National Museum of Mexican Art in December 2006. This name change reflects the status of the museum as the only member of the American Alliance of Museums dedicated to Latino culture.

=== Radio Arte ===
The NMMA ran the radio station WRTE 90.5 FM, called Radio Arte, a non-profit, community station from late 1996 to December 30, 2012. In Spring 2011, the museum announced that the radio station and the building it has been in since the late 1990s had been put up for sale due to financial issues. On June 22, 2012, it was announced that Chicago Public Media had purchased the license of WRTE FM. On December 31, 2012, Chicago Public Media took control of the frequency after FCC approval, thus ending its run as the only Latino-owned broadcast station of any kind in the Chicago area.

== Collections ==
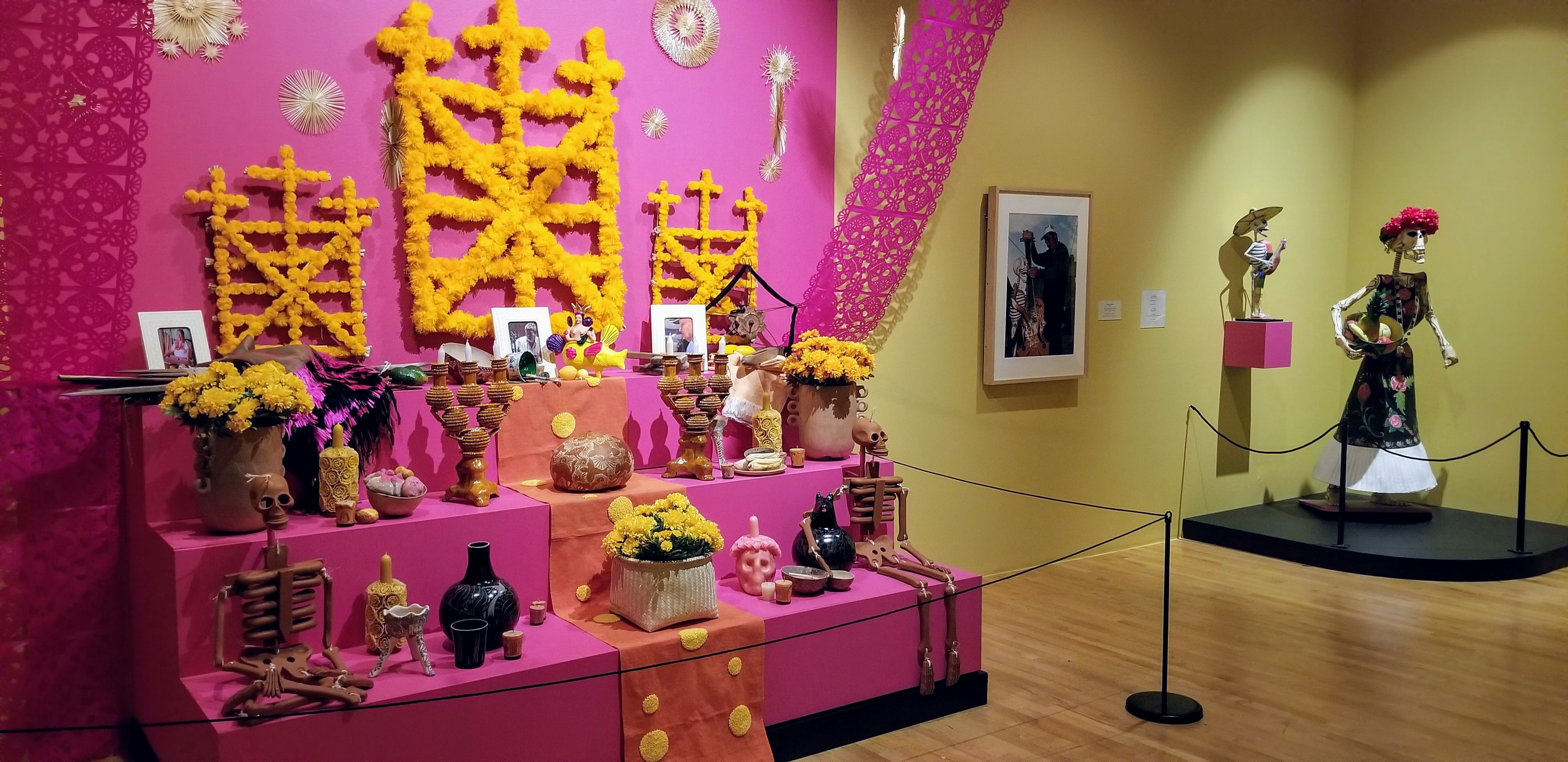
Part of the museum's 2022 Día de los Muertos exhibit.

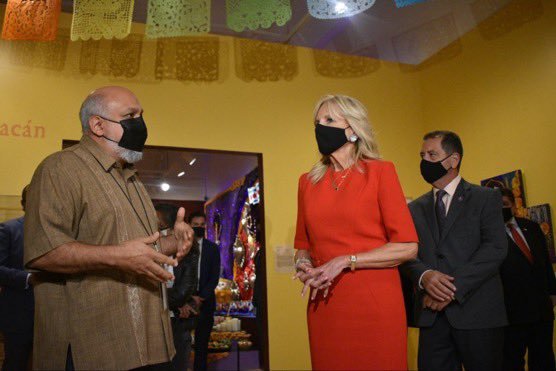
First Lady Jill Biden visiting the museum in 2021.

The museum has a permanent collection featuring prominent works by Mexican artists and artifacts from Mexican history. The permanent exhibit "Mexicanidad: Our Past is Present" explores the history of Mexico in five stages: Pre-Cuauhtémoc Mexico, Colonial Mexico, Mexico from Independence to Revolution, Post-Mexican Revolution to Present-day Mexico and The Mexican Experience in the US.

=== Annual Día de los Muertos exhibit ===
Every October, the museum has a Día de los Muertos ("Day of the Dead") exhibit which features altars and Día de los Muertos-related art by Chicago-area and international artists. This exhibit is the nation's largest.

=== Other initiatives ===
The NMMA also has a program of arts education, performance and community initiatives. In 1994, the museum created two new festivals, Del Corazon: the Mexican Performing Arts Festival and the Sor Juana Festival, dedicated to an important Mexican scholar and writer, Sor Juana Inés de la Cruz. In 1997, the museum created the Yollocalli Arts Reach.

== See also ==
- List of museums and cultural institutions in Chicago
- Mexicans in Chicago
- National Museum of the American Latino
- WRTE
