= WBEW =

Public radio station in Chesterton, Indiana

Simulcasts WBEZ-HD2, Chicago, Illinois
- Chesterton, Indiana; United States
- Broadcast area: Northwest Indiana
- Frequency: 89.5 MHz (HD Radio)
- Branding: Vocalo Radio

Programming
- Format: Urban

Ownership
- Owner: Chicago Public Media; (Chicago Public Media, Inc.)
- Sister stations: WBEQ, WBEZ

History
- First air date: 2001 (as WAJW)
- Former call signs: WAJW (2001–2002)

Technical information
- Licensing authority: Federal Communications Commission
- Facility ID: 3248
- Class: B1 NCE
- ERP: 4,000 watts
- HAAT: 181.9 meters (597 ft)
- Transmitter coordinates: 41°38′6.1″N 87°2′59.1″W

Links
- Public license information: Public file; LMS
- Website: www.vocalo.org

WBEW (89.5 FM) is a non-commercial educational (NCE), Class B1 public radio station at Chesterton in Northwest Indiana. It is owned by Chicago Public Media and is a sister station to WBEZ (91.5 FM) in Chicago. WBEW broadcasts in the HD Radio format.

Since June 2007, the station has been an over-the-air signal for WBEZ's secondary programming service Vocalo, initially airing listener submitted content and later airing an urban format. Vocalo programming is also simulcast over translator station W216CL (91.1 FM) Chicago, fed by WBEZ's HD2 subchannel.

== History ==
The station began broadcasting in early 2001, holding the call letters WAJW. It was owned by Auricle Communications. WAJW aired a freeform radio format, largely simulcasting WFMU 91.1 in East Orange, New Jersey.

In November 2002, the station was purchased by Chicago Public Media for $550,000 and its call letters were changed to WBEW. Chicago Public Media simulcast 91.5 WBEZ on the station from November 2002 until June 2007.

=== Vocalo ===
The station split from its simulcast with WBEZ in June 2007 and was branded "Vocalo". Initially, Vocalo hosts played content that listeners had uploaded to the Vocalo.org website. It was launched with the desire to reach a more racially diverse and younger audience than NPR.

By August 2010, Vocalo had begun to base their playlist on hip-hop, dance, and R&B, and in 2014 adopted the slogan "Chicago's Urban Alternative". In January 2016, the Corporation for Public Broadcasting (CPB) gave Chicago Public Radio $450,000 to refine Vocalo's format, so that the format's viability in other markets could be researched.

On April 3, 2024, Chicago Public Media announced it would discontinue the Vocalo radio broadcast, claiming that the operation had lost money for several years and had an average weekly audience of only 11,000 listeners. The cut drew criticism from the station's union, SAG-AFTRA, as it coincided with a $6.4 million studio upgrade at WBEZ's Navy Pier office and a 19% pay increase for Chicago Public Media's CEO, Matt Moog. The cuts also came only 2 years after CPM acquired the Chicago Sun-Times for $61 million. The announcement included 14 layoffs in total with additional cuts to the WBEZ podcast team and non-newsroom Sun-Times employees.

In late May 2024, Chicago Public Media announced that Vocalo would continue to broadcast over-the-air for an indeterminate period of time, though most original programs ended. In May 2026, in announcing a programming refresh, CPM confirmed it had abandoned plans to shut down Vocalo's radio broadcasts, and that the service would continue to operate over-the-air for the foreseeable future.
