= WBEZ =

Public radio station in Chicago

- Chicago, Illinois; United States
- Broadcast area: Chicago metropolitan area
- Frequency: 91.5 MHz (HD Radio)
- Branding: WBEZ 91.5

Programming
- Format: News/talk (public)
- Subchannels: HD2: Vocalo (urban alternative)
- Affiliations: American Public Media; BBC World Service; NPR; Public Radio Exchange

Ownership
- Owner: Chicago Public Media
- Sister stations: WBEW

History
- First air date: April 7, 1943; 83 years ago
- Former call signs: WBEZ-FM (1983–88)
- Former frequencies: 42.5 MHz (1943–1947)

Technical information
- Licensing authority: FCC
- Facility ID: 66649
- Class: B NCE
- ERP: 5,700 watts
- HAAT: 425.1 meters (1,395 ft)
- Transmitter coordinates: 41°53′56.1″N 87°37′23.2″W (NAD83)
- Translator: See § Satellites and translators
- Repeater: See § Satellites and translators

Links
- Public license information: Public file; LMS
- Webcast: Listen live
- Website: www.wbez.org

WBEZ (91.5 FM) – branded WBEZ 91.5 – is a non-commercial educational radio station licensed to Chicago, Illinois, and primarily serving the tri-state region of the Chicago metropolitan area. It is owned by Chicago Public Media and is financed by listener contributions, corporate underwriting and some government funding. WBEZ is affiliated with both National Public Radio (NPR) and the Public Radio Exchange (PRX). It also broadcasts content from American Public Media and the BBC World Service. It produces several nationally syndicated shows for public radio stations, including documentary program This American Life, and co-produces news and politics quiz program, Wait Wait... Don't Tell Me! with NPR.

WBEZ has an effective radiated power (ERP) of 5,700 watts with its transmitter atop the John Hancock Center on North Michigan Avenue. It broadcasts over two HD Radio digital subchannels. It operates full-power repeaters WBEK (91.1 FM) in Kankakee and WBEQ (90.7 FM) in Morris, as well as several FM translators.

WBEZ-HD2, carrying an "urban alternative music" format branded Vocalo, is also relayed over WBEW (89.5 FM) in Chesterton, Indiana, and translator W216CL (91.1 FM) in Chicago.

== History ==
=== Classroom instruction ===
WBEZ was among the earliest FM stations in Chicago. It first went on the air on April 7, 1943, carrying instructional programming for the Chicago Public Schools. However, initially only a few classrooms were able to tune in, because most did not have FM receivers. It originally broadcast at 42.5 MHz, before moving to 91.5 MHz in 1947.

Its transmitter was located atop Chicago's Morrison Hotel and its studios were in the Builders Building. A 1948 Chicago Tribune article reported that the Board of Education sought zoning approval for a proposed transmitter tower at Marshall Metropolitan High School in Chicago's East Garfield Park neighborhood; however, the FCC history cards, in the "Transmitter Location" section, do not list Marshall High School among WBEZ's transmitter locations. The Tribune article documents only a proposal and does not clearly establish that this site was ever constructed or used. The history cards instead identify transmitter locations in downtown Chicago, including the Bankers Building at 105 West Adams Street. Contemporary sources likewise indicate that the station operated from the Bankers Building at 105 West Adams Street during this period. As of 2021, it is atop the John Hancock Center.

=== NPR affiliation ===
In 1970, WBEZ joined National Public Radio as a charter member and began general programming outside of school hours. Initially, most programming outside of the instructional programs and NPR programs was jazz music. The Board of Education sold the station to the current license holders, the not-for-profit WBEZ Alliance, Inc., in 1990. In September 1995 the parent company and station moved from its old offices to its current location at Navy Pier.

The corporate name was changed in 2010 to Chicago Public Media, Inc. Torey Malatia, the general manager, stepped down in July 2013 after 20 years with the station. Goli Sheikholeslami, formerly of The Washington Post, was appointed as CEO. She took office in April 2014. Goli Sheikholeslami left WBEZ to head New York Public Radio in fall 2019; Steve Edwards, back on staff at WBEZ since 2017, was named interim CEO as of the end of September 2019.

WBEZ broadcasts with an effective radiated power (ERP) of 5,700 watts from an antenna located atop the John Hancock Center in Chicago, at a height above average terrain (HAAT) of approximately 425 meters (1,394 feet). Due to the high elevation of its transmission site, the station provides wide-area coverage across the Chicago metropolitan region comparable to that of other major FM stations operating from similar downtown high-rise sites.

=== Reduction in music programming ===
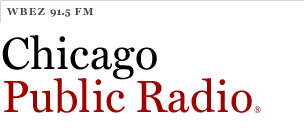
Logo until 2010

On January 4, 2007, the station's long-time overnight jazz programming was eliminated. The music program remaining on the schedule was the world music program Radio M (formerly Passport and in 2019 re-titled Radio Z) on Friday nights. All other music hosts were to be reassigned to other positions at the station, according to a March 2006 article in the Chicago Reader. The replacement of music programming, which management said was due to the prevalence and popularity of other music delivery systems, caused outrage amongst many in the Chicago jazz scene. Protest sites were organized but were unsuccessful. Legendary jazz disc jockey Dick Buckley retained a time slot Sunday afternoons until mid-2008.

Station management announced a five-year plan for Chicago-oriented programs to cover all seven hours between the national news programs.

Other program changes happened in October 2012, with various programs being reshuffled. At the same time, Smiley and West from PRI was dropped from the Sunday afternoon line-up.

=== Midday program change ===
The last day WBEZ aired locally produced international programming was October 4, 2019, with the final broadcast of Worldview with host Jerome McDonnell, which aired weekdays since 1994. The news on the hour at noon stopped being BBC news October 4, and started being NPR news on Monday October 7, 2019, the start of a week of transition.

A daytime hour of Newshour from the BBC World Service began Monday October 7, 2019, replacing The Morning Shift. Beginning Monday October 14, 2019, a new local talk show called Reset started. It was originally hosted by Jenn White. This was considered a shake-up of midday programs, which had not drawn as large an audience as the NPR morning and afternoon news programs, Morning Edition and All Things Considered.

== Programming ==
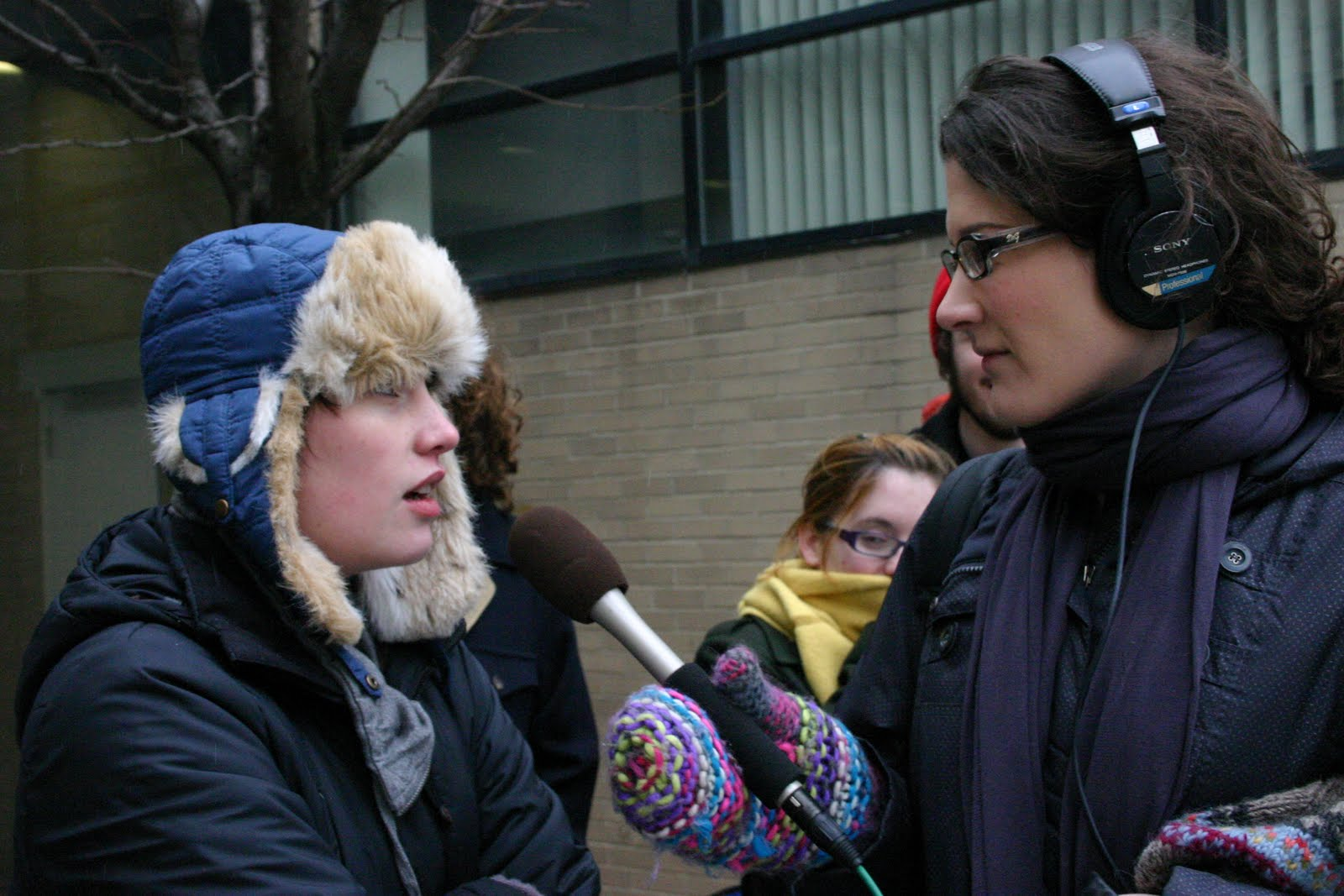
A WBEZ reporter interviewing a Shimer College student at a protest in 2010

Programming on WBEZ includes international news and local news including Curious City, world music, and quiz shows. Notable national programs offered by WBEZ include All Things Considered, Marketplace, Morning Edition, Weekend Edition, PRI's The World and Live From Here. Generally, news and talk programming is heard weekdays and evenings with music and entertainment talk programming on the weekends.

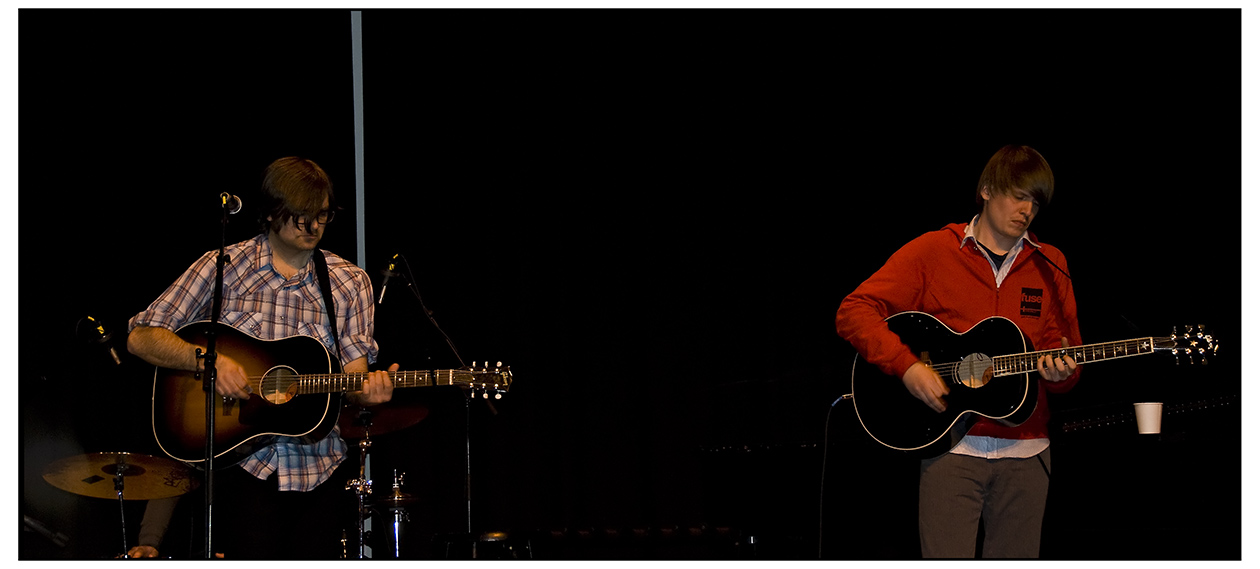
Death Cab for Cutie playing for WBEZ's Sound Opinions in 2008

WBEZ is best known nationally as the producer of This American Life through Public Radio Exchange. This American Life began in 1995 as the local show Your Radio Playhouse; it was renamed in March 1996 and has been national since June 1996.

In addition, Chicago Public Media founded Third Coast International Audio Festival, a showcase for independent radio producers, and the producer of the weekly program Re:sound. WBEZ stopped broadcasting Re:sound circa 2019.".

WBEZ was also the flagship station of The Annoying Music Show!, a 3-minute program that showcased generally annoying songs. The program was produced by former WBEZ program director Jim Nayder. Nayder Communications also produced the somewhat more serious Magnificent Obsession, a program of interviews with persons who have overcome various addictions. The station was also once the flagship station of Steve Cushing's nationally distributed Saturday night blues music program Blues Before Sunrise, which started in 1979 and has been independently produced and distributed by Cushing since 1995. Blues Before Sunrise, was eliminated from WBEZ's lineup in the 2007 restructuring, but was taken over by public radio station WDCB in nearby Glen Ellyn.

Its morning magazine program Eight Forty-Eight was initially named after the postal address of the station, 848 East Grand Avenue. The show was renamed to The Morning Shift, and was dropped in October 2019 in favor of a two-hour local talk show midday, called Reset.

The corresponding afternoon program was called The Afternoon Shift. WBEZ touted the program as "a live talk show featuring in-depth interviews and conversations with [mostly local] newsmakers, artists, writers, and innovators". Original host Steve Edwards left the station after a few months, and longtime Chicago Tribune journalist Rick Kogan temporarily replaced him. As of 2013 and the conclusion of Kogan's interim stint, WBEZ introduced Niala Boodhoo as the show's permanent on-air host. In 2015, WBEZ canceled "The Afternoon Shift"; the final episode aired on June 5, 2015.

Another local program heard Monday through Friday was Worldview, a global issues program that began in 1986 as Midday with Sondra Gair. After Gair's death in 1994, her producer Jerome McDonnell took over the program and hosted it since. It was heard nationally on Sirius Satellite Radio's now-defunct PRI channel from Sirius' inception until 2006. Worldview aired its last program after 25 years on October 4, 2019.

Chicago Public Media is a founding member of the Public Radio Exchange (PRX), a programming cooperative for public radio stations and independent producers. The rock music talk show Sound Opinions, which moved from WXRT in 2005, was distributed nationally by American Public Media until 2010, when its distribution was transferred to PRX. PRX also distributes the film show Filmspotting.

News and news discussion/documentary programs aired on a weekly basis include Latino USA from NPR; Canadian CBC Radio shows Q, Ideas, and Under the Influence with Terry O'Reilly; and Radio Netherlands: The State We're In. Other programs that air weekly include Snap Judgment with Glynn Washington, a story-telling show from PRX and NPR.

== Satellites and translators ==
In addition to its main transmitter on 91.5 FM, WBEZ extends its signal by operating full-power satellite WBEQ/Morris, Illinois (90.7 FM). The station also formerly operated a low-power translator in Elgin, Illinois (W217BM at 91.3). In 2013, Chicago Public Media purchased 91.7 W219CD in Elgin from LifeTalk Radio for $52,500, and W217BM moved to Chicago the following year and changed its frequency to 91.1 as W216CL.

Listeners can also receive the broadcast online with streaming audio, MP3 download or by podcast. As of 2013, the station drew an estimated 400,000 listeners each week.

Several other radio stations also are or were affiliated with Chicago Public Media.

Full-power satellites
Call sign	Frequency	City of license	Facility ID	Class	ERP (W)	Height (m (ft))	Transmitter coordinates	Notes
WBEK	91.1 FM	Kankakee, Illinois	33327	A	2,600	77.3 m (254 ft)	41°9′39″N 87°52′30″W	Simulcasts WBEZ-FM/HD1
WBEQ	90.7 FM (HD)	Morris, Illinois	92544	A	1,470	142.6 m (468 ft)	41°17′9.12″N 88°25′49.25″W	Simulcasts WBEZ-FM/HD1
WBEW	89.5 FM (HD)	Chesterton, Indiana	3248	B1	4,000	181.9 m (597 ft)	41°38′6.1″N 87°2′59.1″W	Simulcasts WBEZ-HD2

Broadcast translators
Call sign	Frequency (MHz)	City of license	Facility ID	Class	ERP (W)	Height (m (ft))	Transmitter coordinates	Rebroadcasts
W216CL	91.1	Chicago, Illinois	91647	D	50	377.2 m (1,238 ft)	41°53′56.12″N 87°37′23.18″W	WBEZ-HD2
W219CD	91.7	Elgin, Illinois	90195	D	10	145 m (476 ft)	42°1′11.09″N 88°22′53.30″W	WBEZ (FM/HD1)
