= Hillaryland =

Group of American political consultants

Hillaryland is the self-designated name of a group of core advisors to Hillary Clinton, particularly while she was first lady of the United States, during her tenure as a U.S. senator from New York, and through her presidential runs in 2008 and 2016.

The group includes Huma Abedin, Patti Solis Doyle, Mandy Grunwald, Neel Lattimore, Ann Lewis, Evelyn Lieberman, Tamera Luzzatto, Capricia Marshall, Cheryl Mills, Minyon Moore, Lissa Muscatine, Neera Tanden, Melanne Verveer, Lisa Caputo, Ann Stock, and Maggie Williams.

== History ==
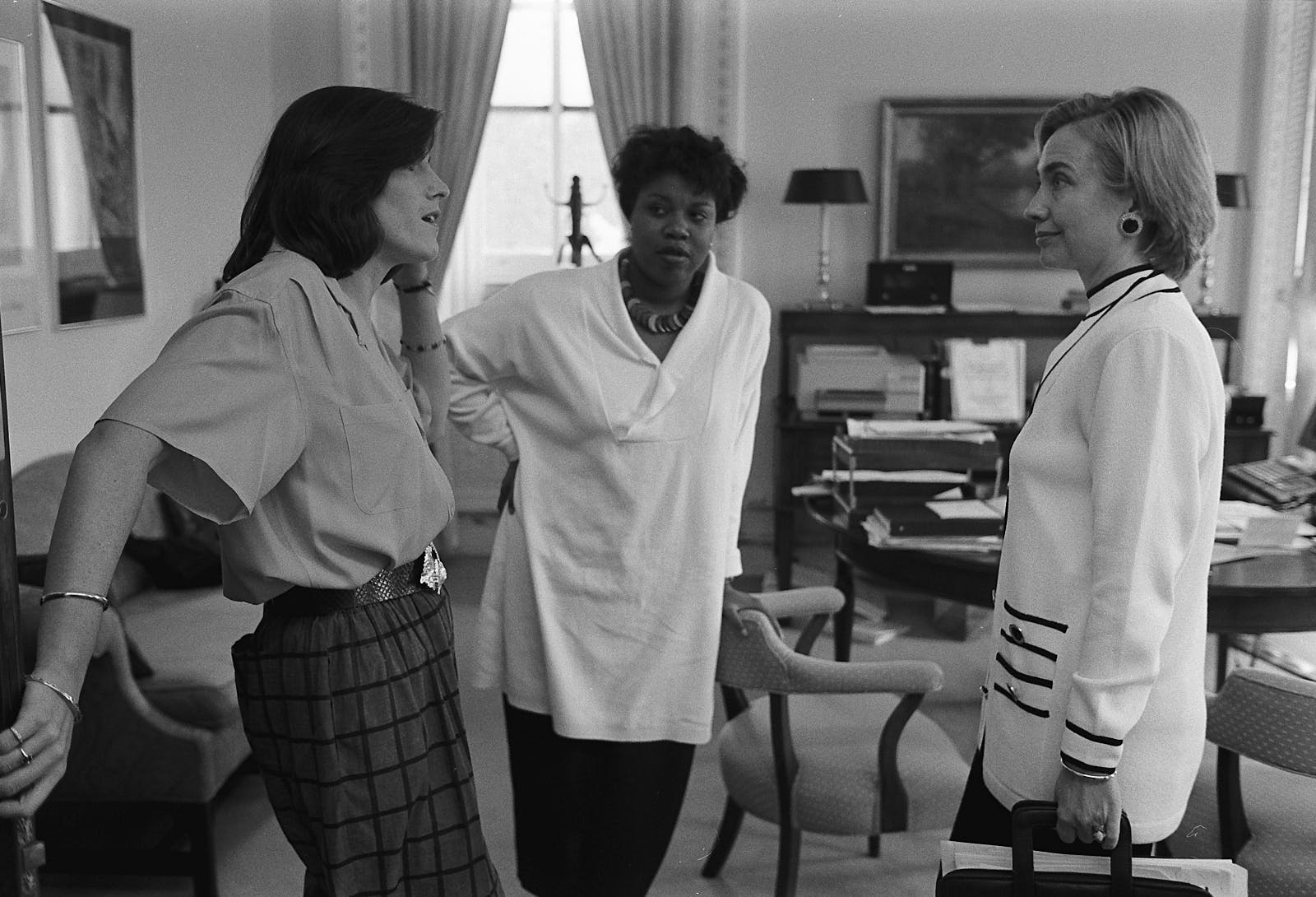
Clinton (right) talking to Hillaryland members Lisa Caputo (left) and Maggie Williams (center) in the West Wing in 1993

Hillaryland is almost exclusively female; the only man in the original group was former first lady deputy press secretary Neel Lattimore. Most worked in the Clinton administration, and have been personal friends and confidants of Hillary Clinton since at least then, if not earlier. The name Hillaryland dates back to Bill Clinton's 1992 presidential campaign, when it was used to refer to the portion of his Little Rock, Arkansas, "war room" that housed Hillary Clinton's staff.

Later, it became better known as the moniker for the area of the West Wing of the White House in which the first lady's staff had their offices. While Hillaryland member Patti Solis Doyle was previously credited with coining the name, Clinton's autobiography Living History attributed the term to political aide Steve Rabinowitz. According to Clinton, Hillaryland had its own subculture based on camaraderie, never leaking information to the press, and having plenty of toys and cookies around for the children of staffers – as Hillary put it, "[w]hile the West Wing had a tendency to leak... Hillaryland never did, and every child who ever visited knew exactly where we stashed the cookies." Clinton biographers Jeff Gerth and Don Van Natta, Jr. described Hillaryland as "an important subculture during the Clinton presidency."

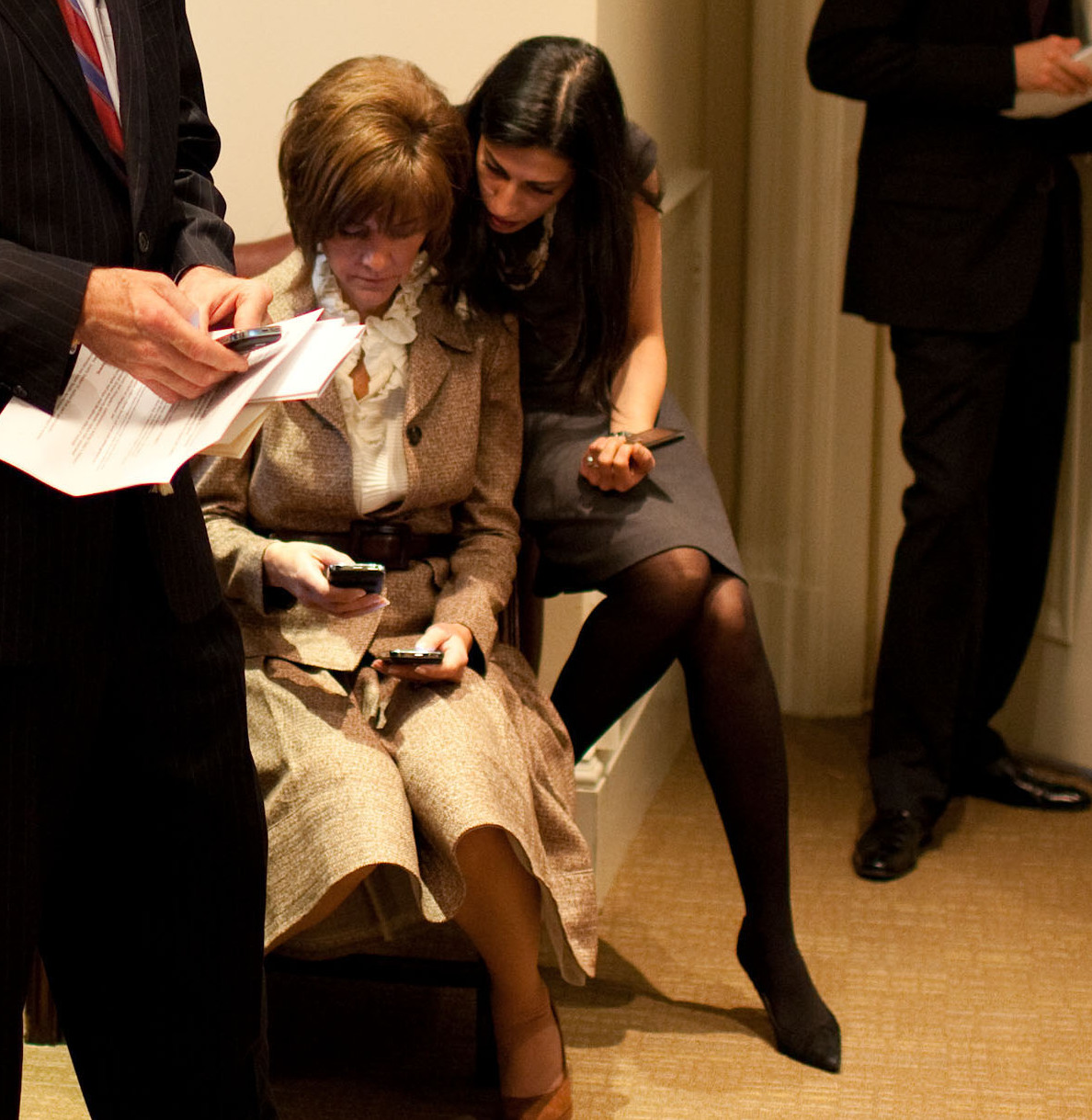
Hillaryland members Capricia Marshall (left) and Huma Abedin (right) outside the Oval Office in 2009

The advisers were also present during Clinton's tenure as U.S. senator. But the role of Hillaryland came under considerable discussion during and after Clinton's 2008 presidential campaign that she conducted while senator. Michelle Cottle of New York magazine described its role as "less a campaign entity than an extended sisterhood defined by its devotion to its namesake. Even so, the group's protective ethos dominates her presidential campaign, where loyalty is demanded, self-promotion frowned upon, and talking out of school, especially to the press, [is strongly discouraged]." As campaign chroniclers John Heilemann and Mark Halperin later wrote, "the people comprising it ... were loyal to a fault, smart and ruthless, hard-headed and hardboiled. ... They referred to themselves collectively as Hillaryland, and everyone else in politics did too." By this point the definition of Hillaryland was often expanded a bit to include campaign insiders such as chief strategist Mark Penn.

After Clinton lost the 2008 Democratic nomination, critics often focused on the limited and isolated circle of advisers and dysfunctional management style as one of the reasons behind the campaign's failure. One criticism was that she valued personal loyalty over the ability to do the job. The level of protection and the consequent inability to criticize failed tactics—and the public perception that Clinton needed that much protection—alarmed critics in 2015 as well, prior to her loss in the general election the following year.

At the beginning of Clinton's 2009–13 tenure as U.S. secretary of state, she brought over some of the Hillaryland personnel to staff the State Department, but she also hired other people as well.

== Gallery ==
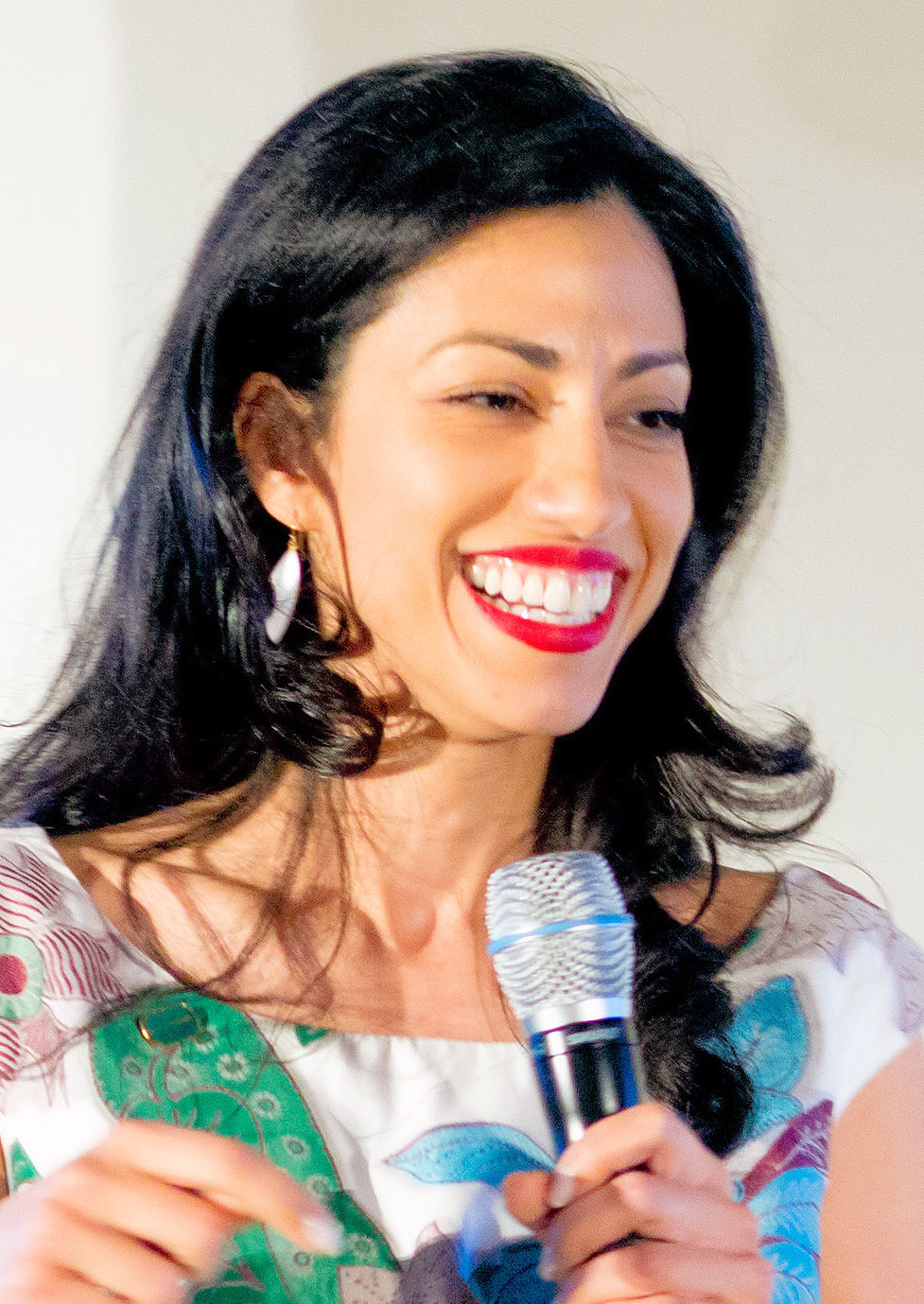
Huma Abedin

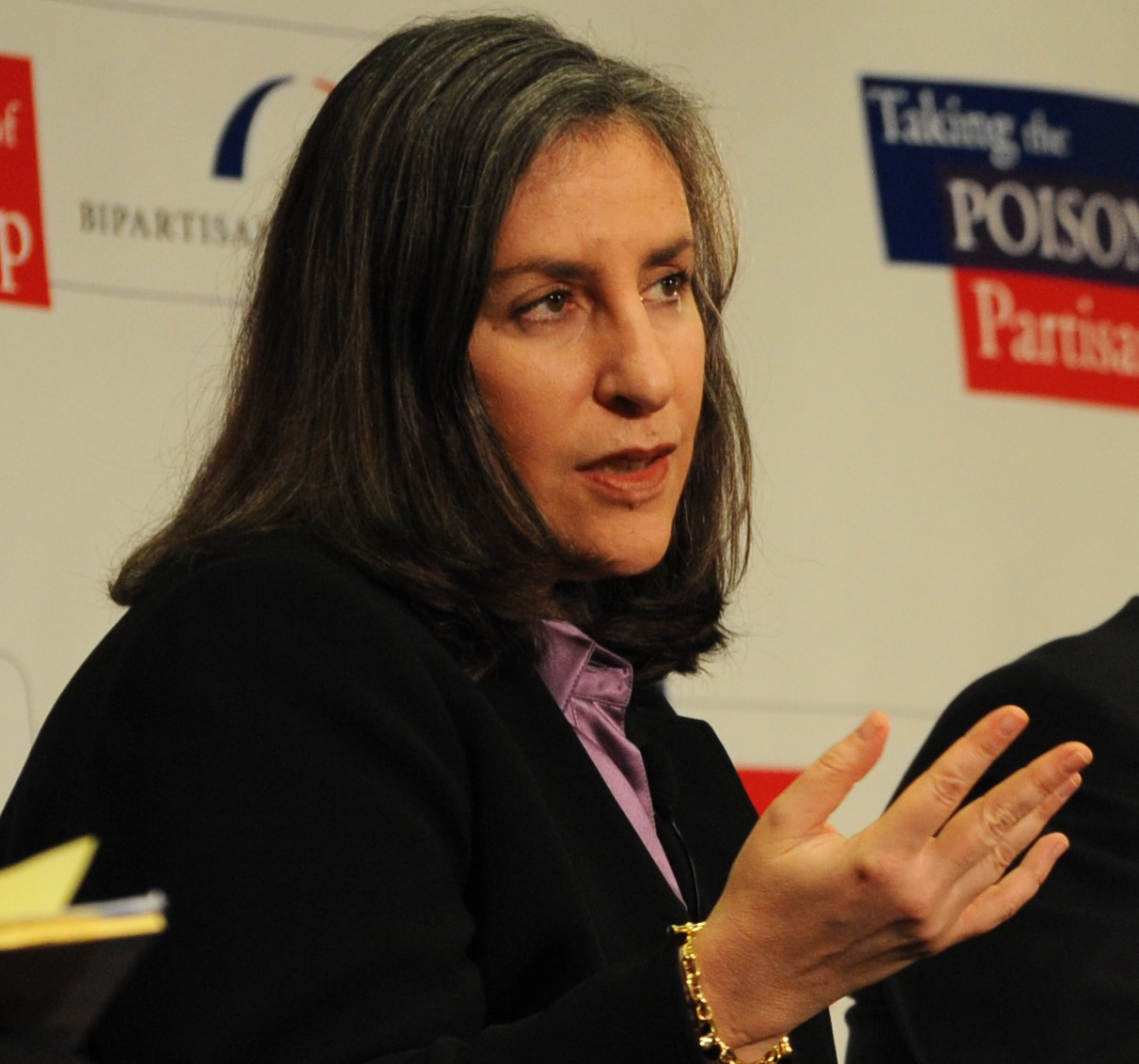
Mandy Grunwald

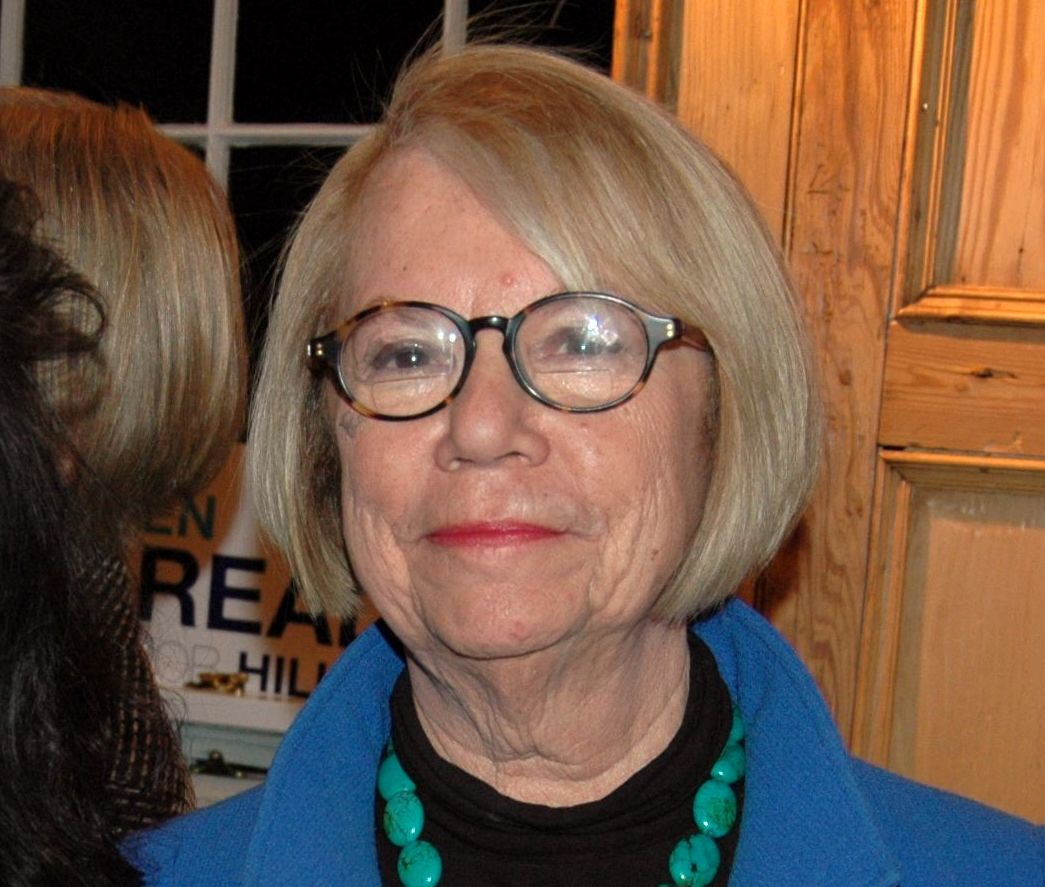
Ann Lewis

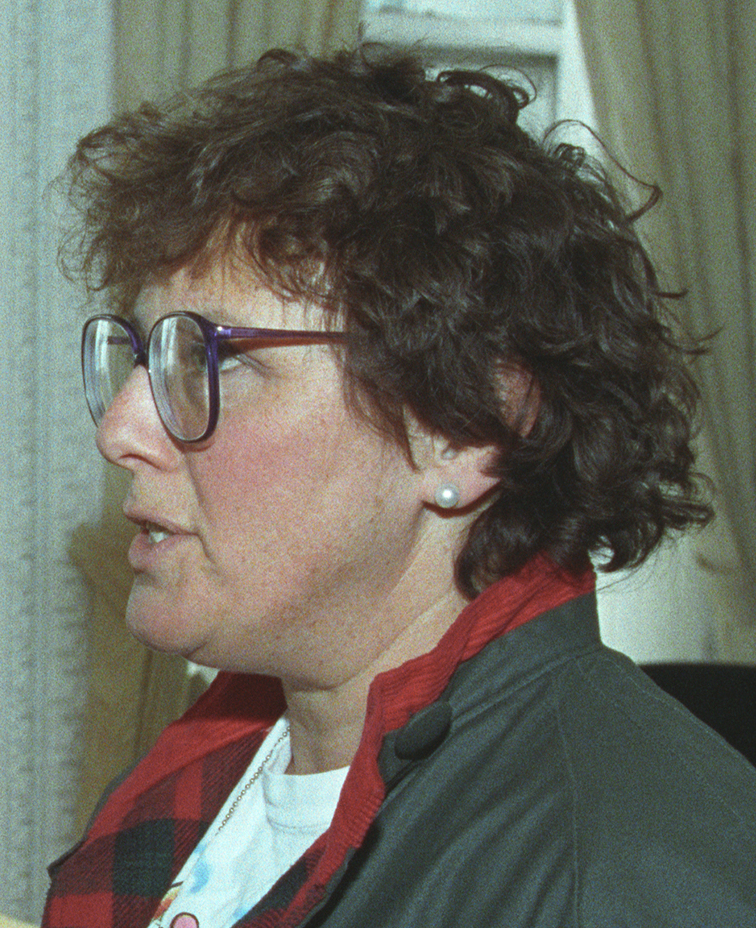
Evelyn S. Lieberman

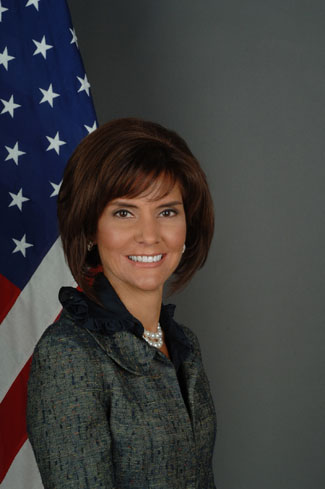
Capricia Marshall

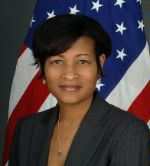
Cheryl Mills

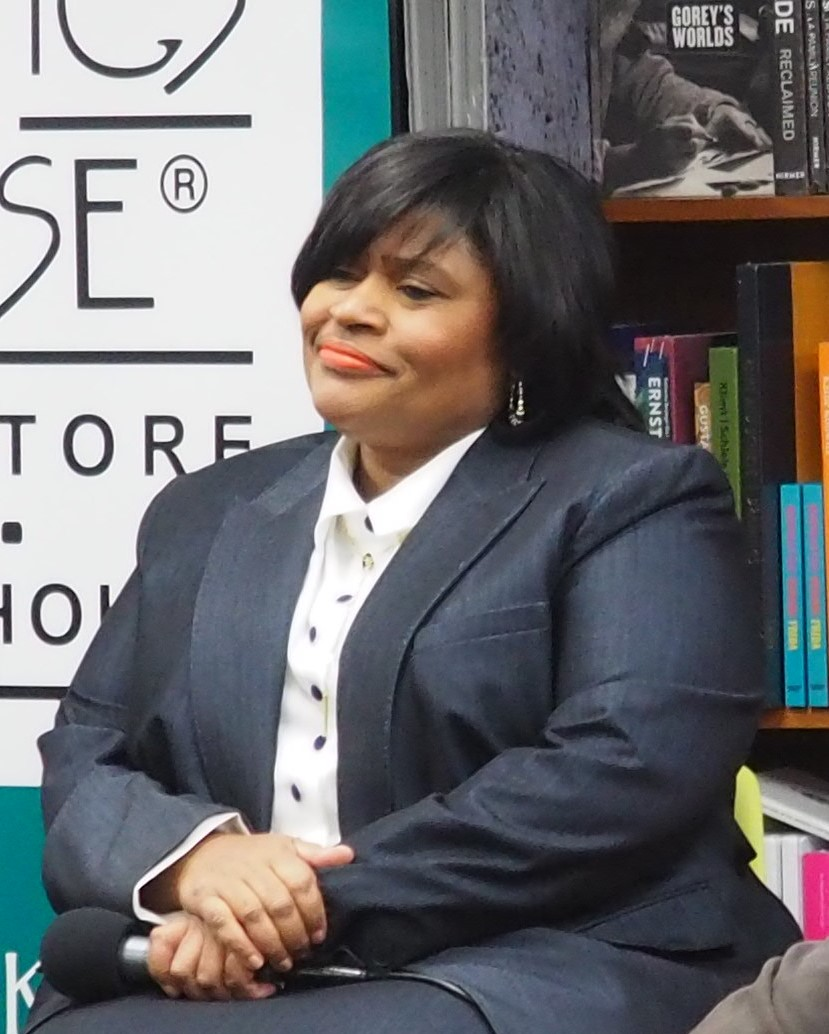
Minyon Moore

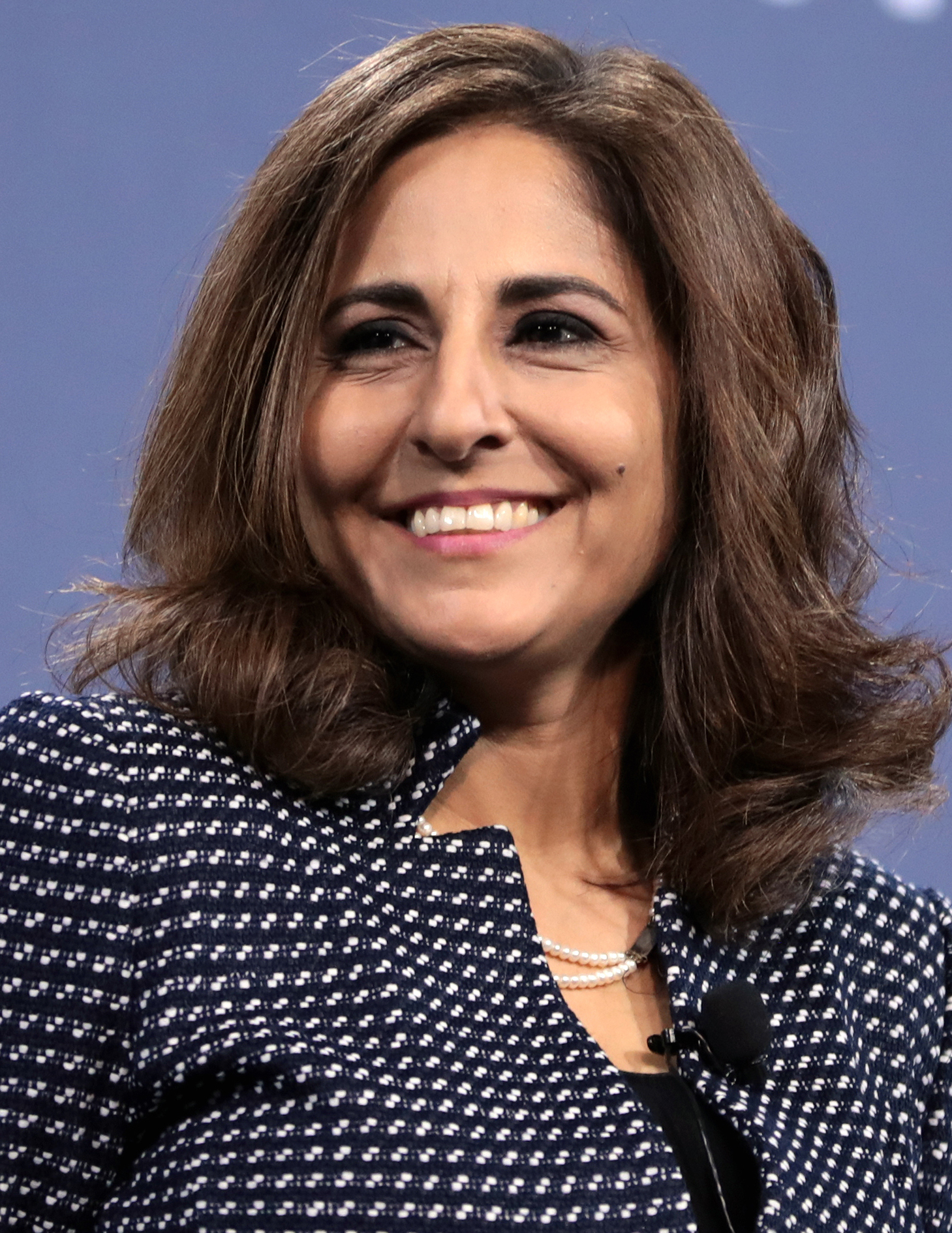
Neera Tanden

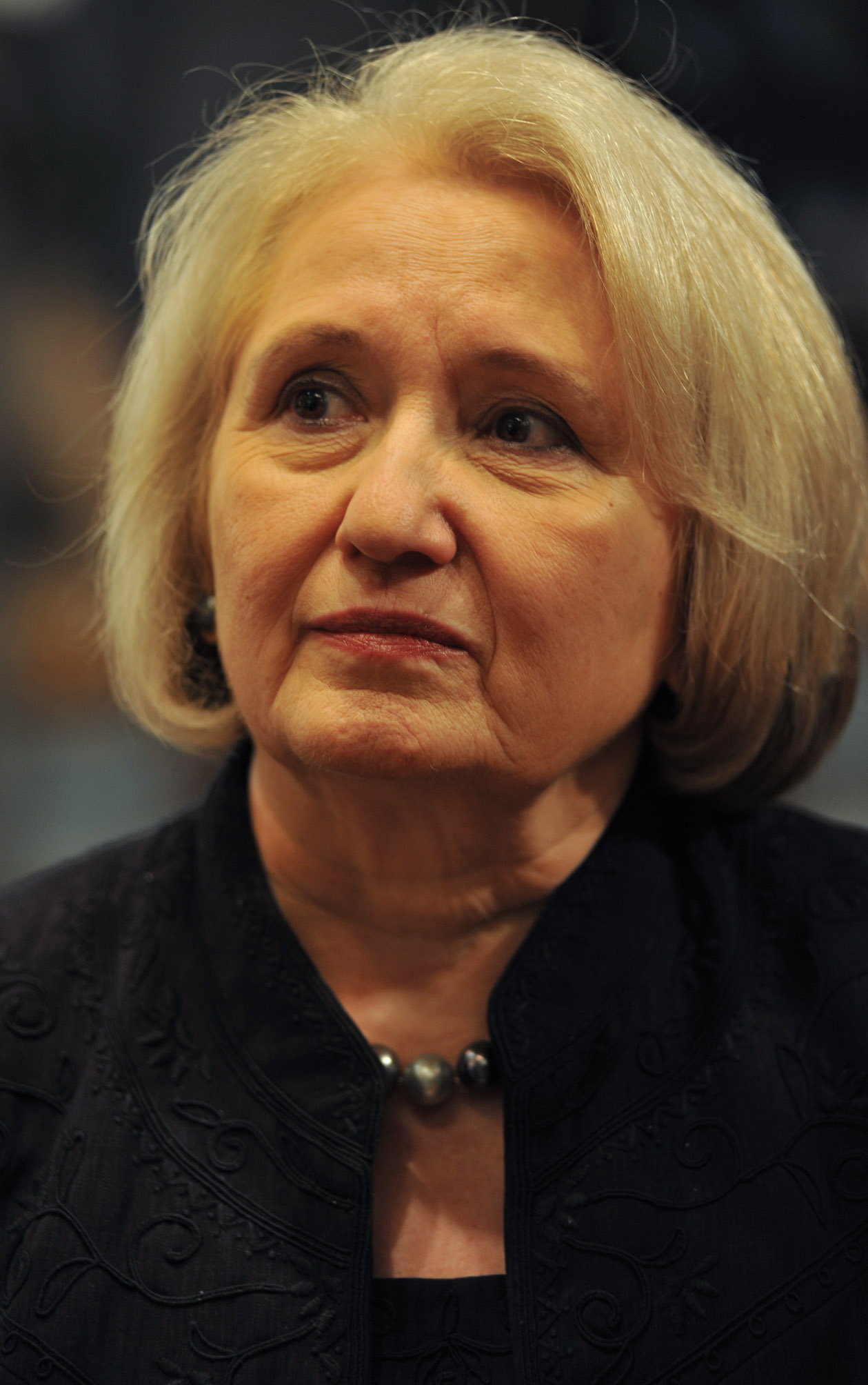
Melanne Verveer

Lisa Caputo

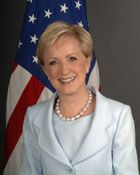
Ann Stock

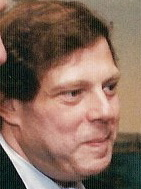
Mark Penn

== See also ==
- Black Cabinet
- Kitchen Cabinet
- Medicine Ball Cabinet
- The War Room
