= Márcio Moreira =

Brazilian marketing executive

Marcio Moreira (born 1947 in São Paulo, Brazil – June 18, 2014) was a multi-cultural marketing executive who played an influential role in the globalization of advertising. In a 44-year career at McCann Erickson Worldwide (subsequently McCann Worldgroup), Moreira headed the agency's InterNational Team—referred to by The New York Times as a "daring experiment in the nascent science of worldwide marketing"—customizing global campaigns to address cultural nuances on a country-by-country basis. Moreira has been credited with accelerating the cross-border, or trans-nationalization, of brands.

Moreira also served for 25 years as worldwide creative director on McCann's biggest clients, including Coca-Cola, General Motors and Nestlé. His multi-cultural expertise attracted the attention of Secretary of State Colin Powell and his Under-Secretary Charlotte Beers, who personally recruited Moreira for a special communications program in the aftermath of the September 11 attacks. The project, codenamed "Shared Values", helped defuse fear and distrust of the U.S. among Muslim communities overseas and at home.

Moreira is best known for his international work in the soft-drink marketplace, specifically on the Coca-Cola account for which Adweek labeled him the "brigadier general" of global advertising. He oversaw the design and implementation of "Coke Is It", a campaign that ran for five years in the U.S market and longer worldwide. He was also the creative leader on the international introduction of Diet Coke.

In 1985, he was one of the key creative executives helping Coca-Cola launch—and handle the subsequent fallout from – New Coke, the company's notorious mistake viewed as a surrender to Pepsi in the "cola wars". It led ultimately to the rebranding of the original formula as "Coca-Cola Classic."

Moreira has won more than 100 creative awards in the U.S. and around the world. In his native Brazil, he was named Advertising Professional of the Year, Decade and, in 2003, the Century.

== Early career ==
In 1967, Moreira began his McCann career as a projectionist and assistant TV producer in Brazil. He was promoted to copywriter in 1969 and one year later to associate creative director. He relocated to the agency's London office in 1971 and became head of a creative group there. He subsequently took writer-producer positions in Lisbon, Frankfurt and Copenhagen, before returning to Brazil where he advanced to creative director of Latin America.

In that post, he headed the General Motors account, particularly the launch of four Chevrolet models, including Opala – the first GM passenger car to be introduced in the Brazilian market.

The agency transferred Moreira to New York in 1980 where Phil Dougherty, advertising columnist for The New York Times, wrote that he was "certainly a man to watch." Soon after, McCann consolidated its three regional creative units – EuroTeam, AsiaTeam and New York Team – into the InterNational Team. At the time, McCann had the industry's most comprehensive global network, with 100 offices in 64 countries. The firm chose Moreira to head this initiative in 1984.

== The face of global advertising ==
When Moreira took over the InterNational team, it had been conceived as a "firefighting" unit, dedicated to helping affiliates around the world resolve problems, such as pitching new business or writing a critically needed spot for a short-handed office. Moreira enhanced the vision, approaching the initiative as an opportunity to change the "brown envelope syndrome" in global advertising, which he described as "when something is created in New York and sent in a brown envelope to offices overseas with instructions to translate.

He was among the first to argue that much of American advertising was "unexportable". In a 1991 interview with Time, he discussed the American cultural tendency toward the "hard sell" and "wearing our feelings on our sleeve" versus other world cultures that resist overt emotional manipulation. Alternately, he addressed in USA Today Americans' customary prudishness toward sexual content in advertising—despite their taste for "titillation in entertainment" - that would be incompatible with advertising in other parts of the world.

Moreira advocated for centralized strategies and concepts, but localized execution that reflects cultural nuances. He often drew on the disparate ways customers around the world perceived product benefits. For example, as diet soda brands grew popular in the 80s, he explained:

"In the American market, if you say a diet drink is to help you keep in shape, it’s like saying a car has four wheels. To be successful, you have to offer that plus tremendous taste and heritage. Overseas, you have to bring to people’s attention that the time has come to look after themselves, and here’s a soft drink that will help [them] with that."

Yet he reinforced the importance of creating a universal brand experience that transcends culture, even though the execution may require nuanced expression. He described this careful balance using the simultaneous Coca-Cola campaigns "You Can’t Beat the Feeling" and "I Feel Coke" that ran in the U.S. and Japan, respectively:

"Japan is probably the one country whose ads would strike you as having the most unique look due to the cultural and ethnic orientation of the advertising. If you forgot for a minute that those faces were Japanese faces, those people live in a Coca-Cola world. The sounds, words and images are actually quite similar to those you see here or in the U.K. or in Australia... They’re different interpretations of the same idea."

Moreira ultimately held McCann posts in eight nations and insisted that team members have on-the-ground experience in the countries where they were helping develop and execute campaigns. He encouraged art directors, writers and producers involved in InterNational Team business to accept long-term overseas career opportunities rather than simply periodic travel. He also maintained that these opportunities needed to be symbiotic throughout the McCann network and not merely involve placement of experts from the New York headquarters around the globe:

"I don’t mean one-way streets, like Americans or Brits going to see the world; I see a two-way street in which other nationalities will come into these cultures and energize them in their own way."

Moreira became an active spokesperson of the new global approach to marketing. He was often pursued for commentary by major business reporters and regularly published opinion pieces in relevant media. When Advertising Age ran a feature on global marketing as "the new wave", an American executive objected to the decision-making authority vested in "some marketing director in Chile [who] is probably a bozo". Moreira wrote a scathing response detailing the new realities of multi-cultural marketing and explaining, "That ‘bozo’ is the global agency's real client", responsible not only for strategy but to profits, given that global work is paid for locally.

In 1989, Moreira was promoted to Vice Chairman/Chief Creative Officer, International, and later named Chief Creative Officer, McCann Worldgroup.

== Asia-pacific years ==
In the mid-90s, McCann Worldwide focused on the Far East, given the re-emergence of China as an economic leader, the rise of the middle class in such markets as South Korea, Taiwan and Singapore, and the region's new sensitivity about cultural values in advertising. McCann named Moreira regional director. He oversaw strategic as well as creative development and helped revitalize McCann's Asia Pacific presence. He also transitioned the McCann Hong Kong office during the British handover to China, and assumed direct management of McCann Tokyo, the firm's largest international office. Likewise, he played a critical role in securing the flagship Coca-Cola account in what had become a highly competitive region.

== Later career ==
In 2000, Moreira was named McCann's Vice Chairman, Global Professional Management of McCann Worldgroup responsible for all personnel handling global accounts - in addition to his international creative role. In 2003, he took his final role as Vice Chairman, Chief Talent Officer and Worldwide HR Director, responsible for worldwide recruitment and career development of thousands of employees.

In recognition of Moreira's defining role in global marketing, Deutsche Bank featured him in its 2001 campaign "New Destinations Call for New Maps" that appeared in The Wall Street Journal, The Financial Times and a full range of international business publications.

Among his major industry awards, Moreira had won a Gold Lion for Coca-Cola, a Silver Lion for Bayer, three Clio Awards for Chevrolet and another for "Coke Is It!" He had been one of only three Americans to chair the International Advertising Film Festival in Cannes, France.

Moreira retired from McCann in 2011.

== Personal life ==
Moreira died June 18, 2014, in Boston, Massachusetts, as a result of complications during heart surgery. He is survived by his wife, Maria Moreira; daughter Eliana Moreira, son Joaquim Moreira, and grandson Lucas Moreira
