= Medicine ball =

Piece of exercise equipment

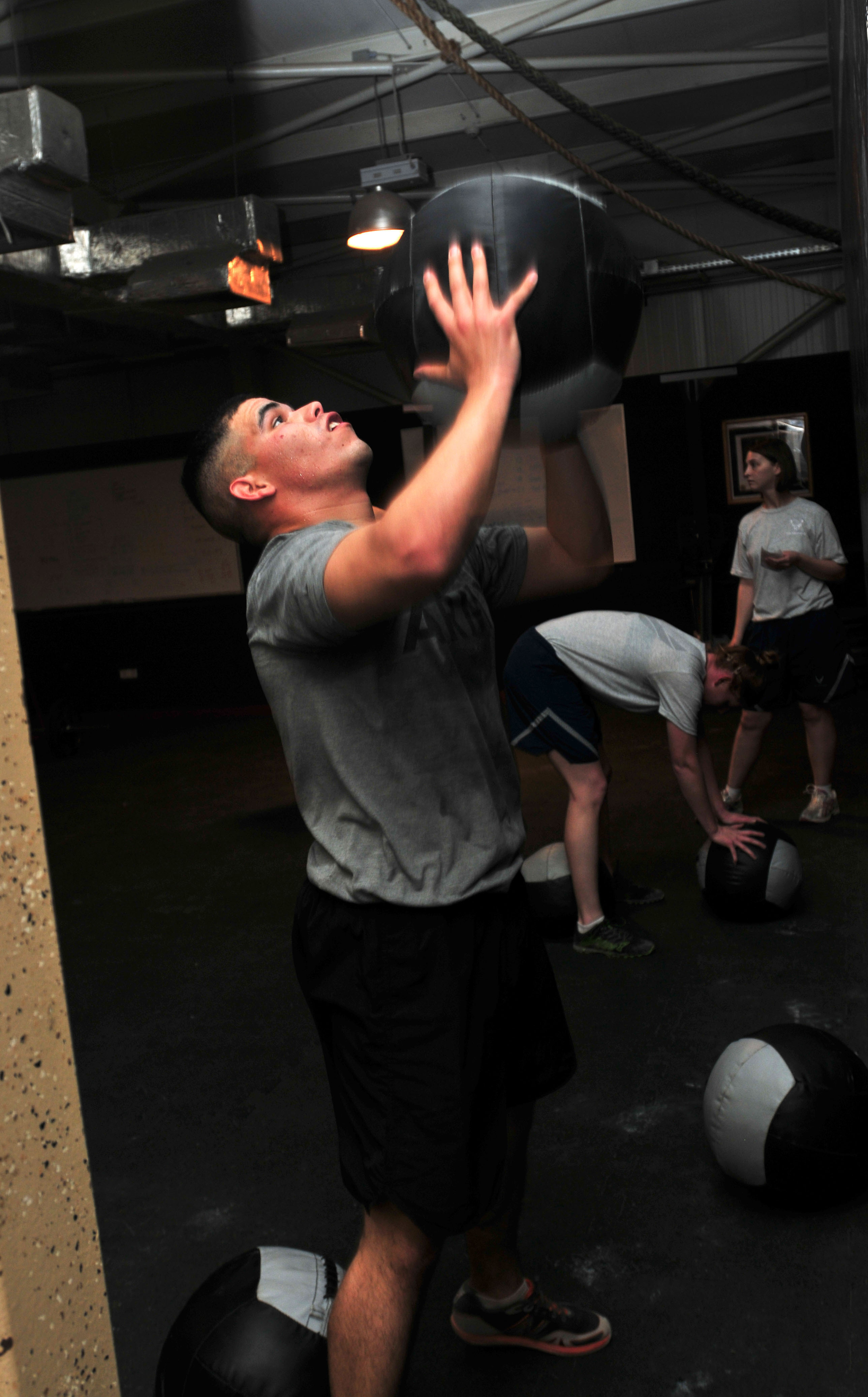
Lifting a medicine ball while exercising

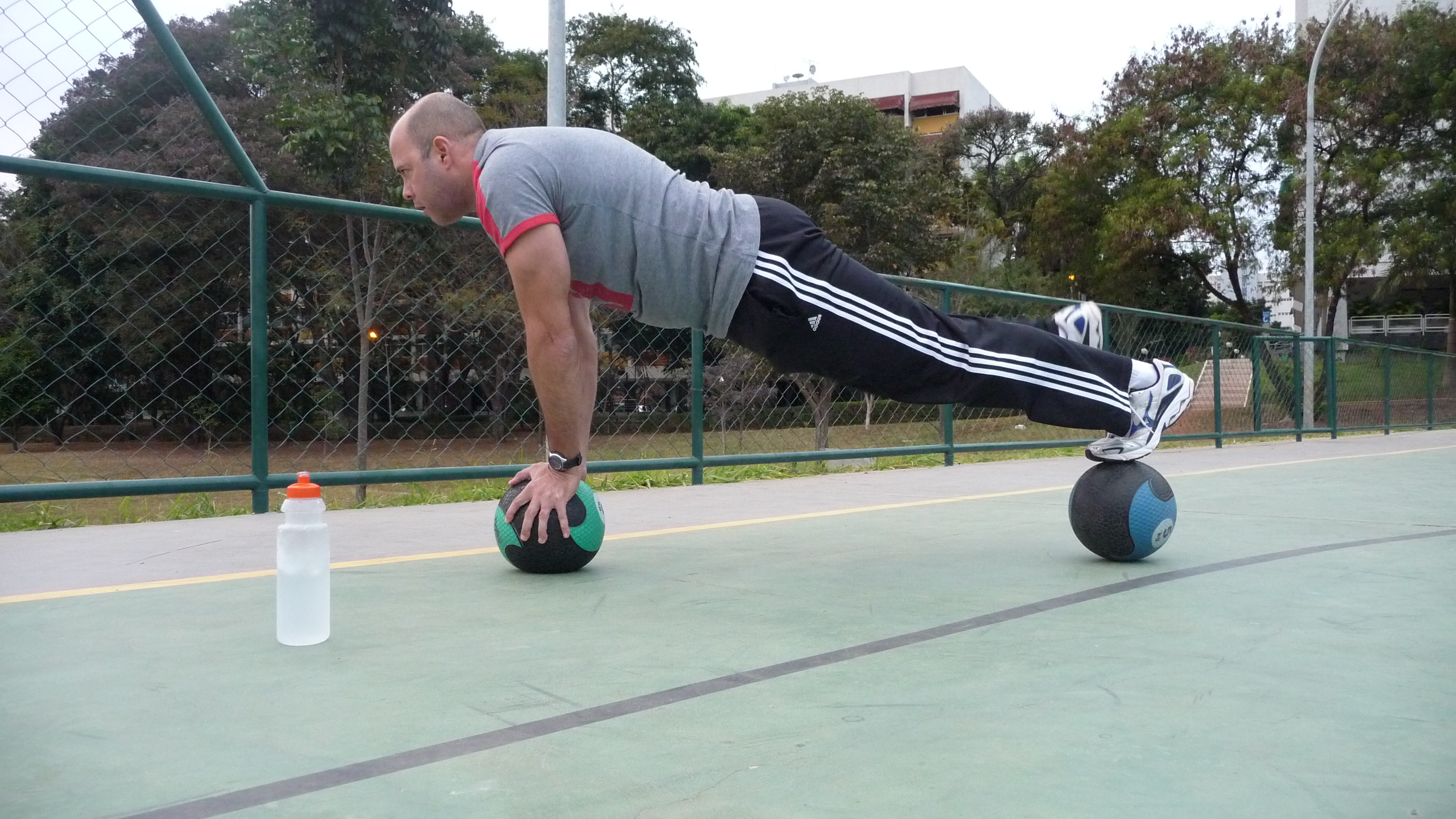
Doing a plank with a medicine ball

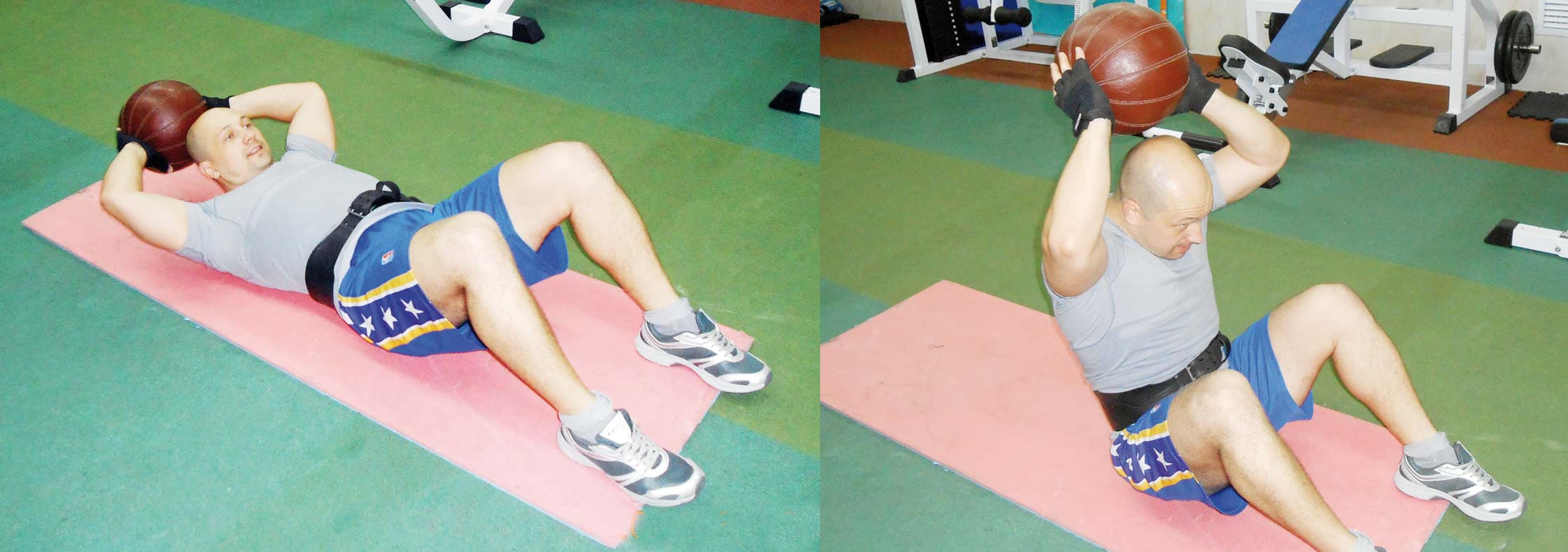
Man doing sit-ups with a medicine ball

A medicine ball (also known as an exercise ball, a med ball, or a fitness ball) is a weighted ball with a common diameter of approximately 350 mm (13.7 in), often used for rehabilitation and strength training. It is distinct from the inflated exercise ball, which is much lighter and larger which is up to 37 in (95 cm) in diameter.

Medicine balls are usually sold in weights between 1–11 kg (2–25 lb) and used in sports medicine to improve strength and neuromuscular coordination and in ballistic training to increase explosive power in athletes in all sports, e.g. throwing the medicine ball or jumping whilst holding it. Some medicine balls are up to 360 mm (14 in) in diameter and up to 6 kg (14 lb) weight, or in the form of weighted basketballs.

== History ==
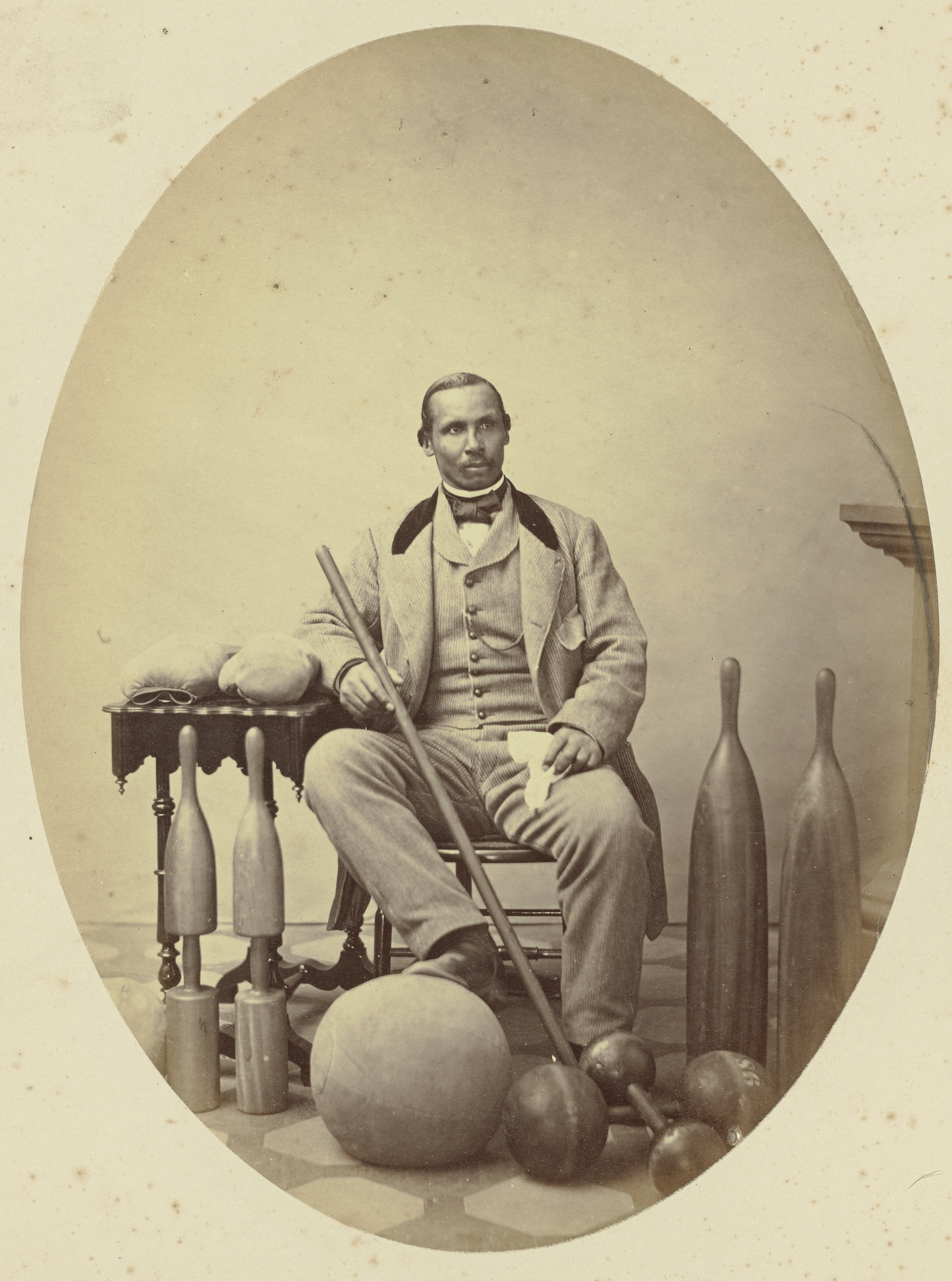
Aaron Molyneaux Hewlett, Director of the Harvard College Gymnasium c. 1860, with a medicine ball at his feet

Hippocrates is said to have stuffed animal skins for patients to toss for medicinal purposes. Similar large balls were said to have been used in Persia, specifically by Persian wrestlers, as well as by gladiators. The first known photograph of a stuffed leather workout ball in the United States was taken in 1866 and shows Harvard athletic instructor Aaron Molyneaux Hewlett surrounded by his equipment. The term "medicine ball" dates back to at least 1876, in American Gymnasia and Academic Record, by Robert Jenkins Roberts Jr.

== Types ==
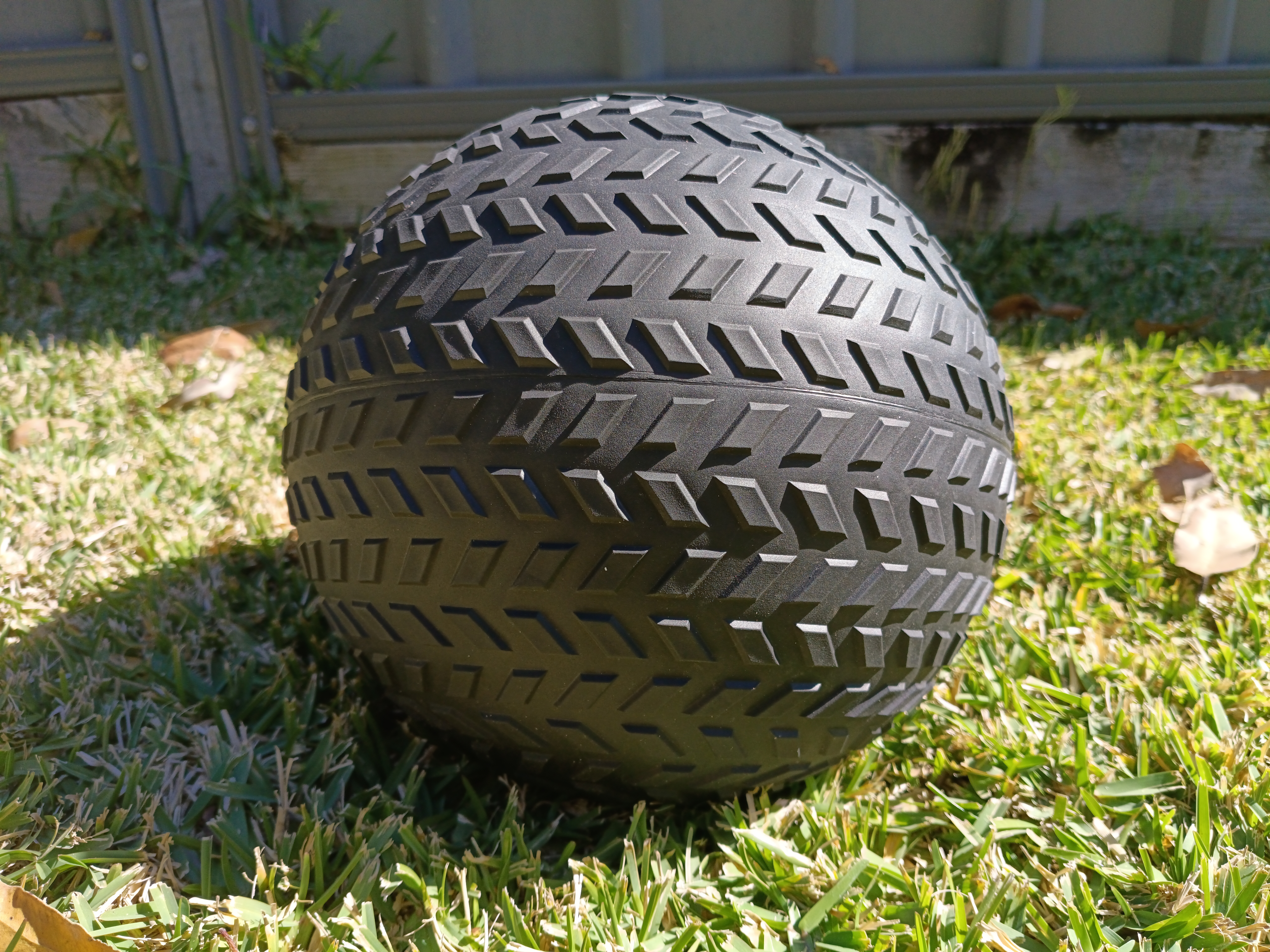
A slam ball with a textured black rubber exterior

The traditional general-purpose medicine ball is used for throwing and catching; typically smaller than a wall ball to allow a firm grip for more powerful or repetitive throws. Generally unsuitable for slamming against the ground as it risks injury due to its bounce and may be damaged quickly by repeated high-impact use.

Variants include:

- Slam ball — Also known as a dead ball; designed for repeated high-impact slamming exercises against the ground and sometimes the wall. It has little rebound or "dead-bounce" and is built to withstand the impact.
- Wall ball — Designed primarily to be thrown at a wall and caught; generally larger than a slam ball and has a controlled rebound. It is not designed to be slammed against the ground.

== See also ==
- Dumbbell
- Exercise ball
- Hooverball, a medicine ball game invented by U.S. President Herbert Hoover's personal physician
- Kettlebell
- Medicine ball cabinet
