= National Jewish Democratic Council =

Dissolved political lobbying organization

- Abbreviation: NJDC
- Successor: Jewish Democratic Council of America (de facto)
- Formation: 1990; 36 years ago
- Dissolved: 2016 (functional, except for remaining litigation and debt payment processes)
- Type: Political, Pro-Israel
- Headquarters: Washington, D. C.
- Location: United States
- Website: www.njdc.org/

The National Jewish Democratic Council (NJDC) was a political lobbying organization that advocated within the Democratic Party for viewpoints aligned with the American Jewish community and in support of the state of Israel, and within the political process generally, between 1990 and about 2016.

== Issues and activities ==
The NJDC's main issues were the U.S.-Israel relationship, separation of church and state (in the US), and reproductive rights.

The NJDC engaged in voter education efforts, and worked with secular and Jewish media to promote the Democratic Party and its ideals.

The organization also served as a resource to Democratic candidates nationally, educating them on issues of importance to the Jewish community. The NJDC served as a liberal watchdog on the lawful activities of the religious portion of the Right, acting to raise public awareness about efforts to undermine the wall between church and state.

In 2007, its Annual Washington Conference attracted every major Democratic candidate for president, the Israeli Ambassador to the United States, and several party leaders, including Democratic National Committee Chairman Howard Dean and House Majority Leader Steny Hoyer.

NJDC worked on the national level to help turn out Jewish voters in the 2004 elections, 2008 elections, and 2012 elections. NJDC also worked to send voter guides and direct mail to targeted Jewish households. In 2004, NJDC targeted 250,000 Jewish households in swing states with an intensive direct mail campaign.

== Demise ==
Accumulating debts, a declining number of donors, outsourcing of functions, and a defamation lawsuit filed by Republican donor Sheldon Adelson against the NJDC (against which the group was ultimately successful) led to the organization's decline between about 2014 and 2016.

It effectively disappeared from the political scene prior to the 2016 presidential election, and in legal pleadings, it stated that it continued to exist only to pay its bills, and because of the continuing litigation against Adelson. Some of its leadership campaigned for the 2016 Clinton presidential campaign under the "Jews for Progress" PAC banner.

The group was replaced on a de facto basis in 2017 by the Jewish Democratic Council of America, which began its activities three months ahead of schedule because of President Donald Trump's perceived equivocal response to the 2017 Charlottesville march and violence.

== Mission ==
The National Jewish Democratic Council was founded in 1990 as the national voice of Jewish Democrats. Its stated priorities included:

- Educating Jewish voters about the differences between their Democratic and Republican candidates for elected office through special reports and voter guides.
- Informing candidates for public office about the need to address and support issues of concern to the Jewish community.
- Advocating on behalf of Jewish and Democratic ideals on Capitol Hill and in Jewish and national media.
- Fighting the radical right agenda at every turn through research and reports, grass-roots advocacy, working directly with lawmakers in Washington, and educating journalists.
- Engaging and cultivating a new generation of young Jewish Democratic leaders by replicating the Washington-based Young Leadership program in other major cities, including New York, Boston, Los Angeles, Cleveland, and South Florida.
- Expanding Jewish awareness of critical legislative activity through quarterly and bi-weekly publications, as well as Breakfast Roundtables and Domestic Issues Forums featuring Congressional and executive branch leaders.

== NJDC leadership ==
- Senator Ben Cardin, Honorary Chair
- Senator Ron Wyden, Honorary Chair
- Stephen Bittel, Vice-Chair, Miami, FL
- Steve Rabinowitz, Vice-Chair, Washington, D. C.
- Marc Winkelman, Vice Chair, Austin, TX
- Sheldon Cohen, Secretary, Washington, D. C.
- Sunita Leeds, Treasurer, Washington, D. C.

== 2008 election ==
In October 2008, the NJDC held a conference in Washington, D. C., at which then vice presidential candidate Joe Biden was the keynote speaker. Other notable speakers included Al Franken and Governor Howard Dean.

It was noted that "In 2008, the NJDC trained nearly 100 surrogates to speak around country, according to [executive director Ira] Forman, ran newspaper ad campaigns in pivotal swing states, sent 350,000 targeted pieces of mail to Jewish households, dropped 35,000 pieces of literature in key Jewish neighborhoods, and ran Internet and Google word search campaigns".

In an article written on November 9, 2008, it was mentioned that "American Jewish voters have once again overwhelmingly supported the Democratic presidential nominee", and that "with Obama's victory, we selected a candidate who shares the values of the vast majority of American Jews, including the separation of church and state, a strong U.S.-Israel relationship, and reproductive freedom".

During the final days of the 2008 presidential campaign, an article came out explaining that the "National Jewish Democratic Council is sending out more than 350,000 mailers to Jewish households in key swing states, re-asserting the Democratic nominees stance on a number of issues". This article includes many fliers put out by the NJDC in order to inform voters about Barack Obama and Joe Biden's positions on Israel.

Marc Stanley, chairman of the NJDC, wrote an op-ed in the JTA entitled "Why Jews Voted for Obama". In the article, he gave two explanations: "First, Obama’s performance in the debates belied the GOP narrative that he could not be trusted, while McCain’s pick of Alaska Gov. Sarah Palin as his running mate undermined his Jewish support. Second, Jewish Democrats - the National Jewish Democratic Council, along with the Obama campaign and other independent efforts - were better organized than ever." In 2008, exit polls showed that Barack Obama received 78% of the Jewish vote.

== Barack Obama presidency ==
The NJDC approved of the Obama administration's policies such as the 2009 stimulus package, and the president's decision to pull out of Durban II, the UN conference against racism which has been known to be a forum for anti-Israel agitation. The NJDC also declared its trust in Obama's support for Israel, and charged other organizations, like the Republican Jewish Coalition, of distorting information about Barack Obama and his support for Israel.

== See also ==
- Democratic Majority for Israel
- List of Jewish American politicians
- Jewish Democratic Council of America
- Republican Jewish Coalition
