= Hooverball =

Ball sport

Hooverball (Note: Alternatively spelled Hoover-Ball.) is a medicine ball game invented by U.S. President Herbert Hoover's personal physician, Joel T. Boone, to help keep Hoover fit. The Hoover Presidential Library Association and the city of West Branch, Iowa co-host a national championship each year.

In general, the game is played on a volleyball-type court of grass or sand and involves throwing a heavily weighted medicine ball over the net. Officially, in Hooverball, the medicine ball weighs about 6 lb (2.7 kg) and is thrown over an 8 ft (2.4 m) volleyball-type net. The game is scored like tennis. The ball is caught and then thrown back. The weight of the medicine ball can make the sport quite physically demanding.

== History ==
The sport was conceived shortly after Hoover won the 1928 presidential election. While on a trip to South America, Hoover observed a game of "Bull-in-the-Ring" being played on the Battleship Utah. Bull-in-the-Ring was popular among navy ships and was an inspiration for Hooverball. In Bull-in-the-Ring the ball was soft and weighed 9 lb (4 kg). The person in the middle of the circle was called the "bull". While on these navy ships, Hoover enjoyed watching and playing the game. The net was 8.5 to 9 ft (2.6 to 2.7 m) high and 30 ft (9.1 m) wide. The New York Times described it as a "distinctly strenuous affair, best understood as exactly like tennis except that the net is eight feet high, there are no racquets and the ball is a hefty medicine ball weighing from 5 to 9 pounds.

In 1931, William Atherton du Puy named it as Boone-ball.

== Rules ==
Rules are usually determined "in house." However, the traditional rules are as follows:

1. Points are scored when a team either fails to catch the return, fails to return the ball across the net, or returns the ball out of bounds.
2. The ball is served from the back line.
3. The serve is rotated among one team until the game is won. Teams alternate serving after each game.
4. The ball must be caught on the fly and immediately returned from the point it was caught. There is no running with the ball or passing to teammates.
5. Each team's court is divided in half. A ball returned from the front half of a team's court must be returned to the back half of its opponent's court. If the ball doesn't reach the back court, the opponent is awarded the point.
6. A ball that hits the out-of-bounds line is a good return.
7. A player who catches the ball out-of-bounds, or is carried out-of-bounds by the force of the ball, may return in-bounds before the return.
8. A ball that hits the net on its way over is a live ball. (If it was thrown from the front court, it must reach the opponent's back court to be good.)
9. Teams may substitute at dead ball situations.
10. Women serve from the mid-court line
11. Women may pass once before a return.
12. Women may return the ball to any area of the opponent's court.
13. Good sportsmanship is required. Support the members. Points in dispute are played over.

== See also ==
- Medicine Ball Cabinet
