= Evelyn S. Lieberman =

American public affairs professional

1st Under Secretary of State for Public Diplomacy and Public Affairs
- In office October 1, 1999 – January 20, 2001
- President: Bill Clinton
- Preceded by: Position established
- Succeeded by: Charlotte Beers

White House Deputy Chief of Staff for Operations
- In office January 11, 1996 – January 20, 1997
- President: Bill Clinton
- Preceded by: Erskine Bowles
- Succeeded by: John Podesta

Personal details
- Born: Evelyn May Simonowitz; July 9, 1944 Brooklyn, New York, U.S.
- Died: December 12, 2015 (aged 71) Washington, D.C., U.S.
- Party: Democratic
- Domestic partner: Edward Lieberman
- Education: Buffalo State College (BA)

Evelyn May Lieberman (née Simonowitz; July 9, 1944 – December 12, 2015) was an American public affairs professional who, during the Clinton administration, became the first woman to serve as White House Deputy Chief of Staff, and was the first United States Under Secretary of State for Public Diplomacy and Public Affairs.

From 2002 to 2015, Lieberman worked for the Smithsonian Institution, most recently as Senior Advisor and Assistant to the Secretary for external relations.

== Life and career ==
Lieberman was press secretary to Senator Joe Biden (D-DE) from 1988 to 1993; Director of Public Affairs for the Children's Defense Fund; and Communications Director for the National Urban Coalition. She was also a director of the Trust for Early Education, an advocacy group devoted to ensuring that children in America receive pre-Kindergarten preparation for education.

Lieberman first joined the White House in 1993 as Assistant to First Lady Hillary Rodham Clinton's Chief of Staff. She rose to the rank of Deputy Assistant to the President with the job title of Deputy Press Secretary. On January 10, 1996, Chief of Staff Leon Panetta announced her appointment as Assistant to the President and Deputy Chief of Staff.

While another Deputy Chief of Staff managed policy and politics, Lieberman oversaw White House operations and administrative functions: the Office of Scheduling and Advance, the Office of Management and Administration, the Office of Presidential Personnel, and the Office of the Staff Secretary, as well as Director of Oval Office Operations. She focussed on bringing discipline to the young, energetic White House staff; in announcing her appointment, Panetta said that "she brings the perfect mixture of chicken soup and a kick in the butt that we need in this job."

While serving as Deputy Chief of Staff, Lieberman, with the approval of Panetta, transferred Monica Lewinsky — the former intern later found to have had an inappropriate relationship with the President—out of the White House into the United States Defense Department Public Affairs office. In subsequent grand jury testimony, Lieberman recalled removing Lewinsky for "spending too much time around the West Wing".

The story of Lewinsky's firing reportedly contributed to Lieberman's "cult status" as a tough enforcer among the Hillary Clinton supporters collectively known as "Hillaryland". "If Lieberman invites you for a walk", Hillaryland members joked, "don't go. It means you're fired."

At the beginning of Clinton's second administration, Lieberman wanted to return to public affairs, and Clinton appointed her director of the Voice of America. When VOA's parent organization, the U.S. Information Agency, was folded into the State Department in 1999 (minus VOA, which became a unit of the separate Broadcasting Board of Governors) she was appointed senior adviser to the United States Secretary of State. She was then nominated by the President and confirmed by the Senate as Under Secretary of State for Public Diplomacy and Public Affairs, overseeing the Department's spokesman, its international public information operations, and its education and cultural programs. Her overall mission was improving the image of the United States internationally.

She served as Director of Communications and Public Affairs at the Smithsonian Institution from 2002 - early 2015, taking time off to serve as chief operating officer of Hillary Clinton's presidential campaign.

== Personal life ==
Lieberman, a native New Yorker, graduated from Buffalo State College in 1966. She delivered the commencement address at Buffalo State in 2014 and was presented with an honorary degree from the college.

She was married to attorney Edward H. Lieberman. On December 12, 2015, she died of pancreatic cancer.

Political offices
Preceded by Erskine Bowles	White House Deputy Chief of Staff for Operations; 1996–1997	Succeeded by John Podesta
New office	Undersecretary of State for Public Diplomacy and Public Affairs; 1999–2001	Succeeded by Charlotte Beers
