= Notre Dame High School for Girls =

Notre Dame High School

Location
- 3000 North Mango Avenue; Chicago, Illinois 60634; United States; 41°56′8″N 87°46′13″W

Information
- Type: private, parochial
- Motto: Imagine the Possibilities...
- Denomination: Roman Catholic
- Patron saint: St. Julie Billiart
- Established: 1938
- Founder: Sisters of Notre Dame de Namur
- Closed: 1 July 2016
- Oversight: Archdiocese of Chicago
- Principal: Irene Heidelbauer
- Grades: 9–12
- Gender: All-female
- Enrollment: 70 (2014)
- Student to teacher ratio: 6:1
- Campus type: Urban
- Colors: Columbia Blue, White and Navy Blue
- Slogan: Faith Based, Technology Rich, College Prep
- Athletics conference: Girls Catholic Athletic Conference
- Mascot: Lady Panther
- Team name: Lady Panthers
- Accreditation: North Central Association
- Publication: Literary Expressions
- Newspaper: Corridor Chronicle
- Yearbook: The Window
- School fees: $400-$545
- Tuition: $7,800
- Affiliation: St. Ferdinand Parish
- Website: www.ndhs4girls.org (inactive)

Notre Dame High School for Girls was a private, Roman Catholic, all-girls, college prep 9-12 high school in Chicago, Illinois, United States. It was founded in 1938 by the Sisters of Notre Dame de Namur and in 2009, was incorporated by the Archdiocese of Chicago, making it part of the St. Ferdinand Parish. Its teachings were based on the educational philosophy of St. Julie Billiart, founder of the Sisters of Notre Dame de Namur. The school provided moral, academic, physical and social education.

On June 16, 2016, the Roman Catholic Archdiocese of Chicago announced that, after years of dwindling enrollment, the school would be closing its doors on July 1, 2016.

== Notable alumnae ==
- Jaslene Gonzalez, winner of America's Next Top Model, Cycle 8
- Bonnie Hunt, actress from featured films such as Cheaper by the Dozen and Jumanji
- Nadine Velazquez, actress best known for her role as Catalina on TV's My Name is Earl
- Patti Solis Doyle, political adviser best known for her role as Campaign Manager for 2016 Presidential candidate Hillary Clinton
- Georgianne Walken, casting director
