= Patti Solis Doyle =

American political consultant

Personal details
- Born: August 23, 1965 (age 60); Chicago, Illinois, U.S.
- Political party: Democratic
- Spouses: Andy Jacobson (divorced); Jim Doyle
- Children: 2
- Relatives: Daniel Solis (brother)
- Education: Northwestern University (BA)

Patti Solis Doyle (born August 23, 1965) is an American political operative and was in 2008 a senior adviser to the presidential campaign of Barack Obama, where she was the campaign chief of staff to Joe Biden, Obama's vice presidential choice.

Previously Solis Doyle was a longtime aide to Hillary Clinton, having started her association with the former First Lady as Clinton's assistant during Bill Clinton's 1992 presidential campaign. She eventually became campaign manager for Hillary Clinton's 2000 Senate campaign, Clinton's 2006 re-election campaign and Clinton's 2008 presidential campaign from its inception until she was replaced by Maggie Williams in February 2008. She currently does public speaking at events throughout the country.

== Early life and career ==
Doyle was born in Chicago, Illinois, the youngest of six children. Her parents, Santiago and Alejandrina Solis, were immigrants from Monterrey, Mexico. She grew up in Chicago in the Pilsen neighborhood, attending the Notre Dame High School for Girls. Solis Doyle is an alumna of Northwestern University, where she received a Bachelor of Arts degree in communication in 1989. Doyle entered politics working on Richard M. Daley's campaign for mayor of Chicago in 1989. Later she went with David Wilhelm (Bill Clinton's campaign manager) from Chicago to Little Rock, where she became Hillary Clinton's assistant. She is credited with coining the term "Hillaryland", the close circle of Clinton advisers, dating back to 1992.

Her oldest brother, Daniel Solis, was a Chicago alderman representing the 25th ward.

== Hillary Clinton 2008 presidential campaign ==
Appointing Solis Doyle as her 2008 presidential campaign manager, Clinton said, "I have complete confidence and trust in her as a person and as a professional. She was the natural choice for me when it came to picking someone to run this campaign." Solis Doyle thus became the first Hispanic woman to manage a presidential campaign.

Although Solis Doyle was asked to leave the campaign after Clinton's third-place showing in the Iowa caucuses, she and Clinton are reportedly still in touch and Solis Doyle still considers Clinton "a friend of mine."

== Barack Obama presidential campaign ==
On June 16, 2008, the Obama campaign announced Solis Doyle would join the campaign as the chief of staff for his vice presidential nominee, revealed on August 23, 2008, to be Joe Biden, the senior U.S. senator from Delaware. The news angered some in the Clinton circle who felt the move was intended to send a message that Clinton would not be asked to be Obama's vice presidential nominee. Obama later stated that this was not his intended message. Ron Klain ended up becoming Biden's chief of staff instead.

== 2016 presidential campaign ==
During the first presidential debate on September 26, 2016, Donald Trump claimed that Solis Doyle sent an aide to Africa to track down Obama's birthplace. Following the debate, Solis Doyle explained on CNN that Trump's statement was not true and in fact she had fired a campaign volunteer who had forwarded an email claiming that Obama was Muslim.

== Public speaking ==
Solis Doyle does public speaking at functions around the country, particularly at events relating to the promotion of minorities and women. In her speeches, she discusses her personal story growing up on Chicago's south side as a daughter of Mexican immigrants, as well as her current and past involvement in American political campaigns. On June 20, 2009, Solis Doyle gave the commencement speech for Northwestern's School of Continuing Studies.

== Personal life ==
She resides in Washington, D.C., with her husband Jim and two children.
