= Daniel Solis =

American politician

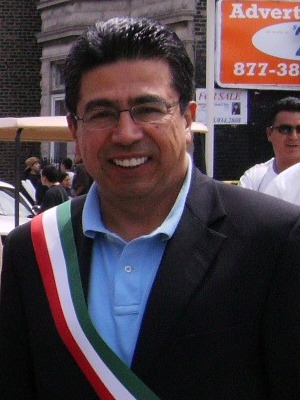
- Solis at Cinco De Mayo Parade 2009

Member of the Chicago City Council from the 25th ward
- In office March 6, 1996 – May 20, 2019
- Preceded by: Ambrosio Medrano
- Succeeded by: Byron Sigcho-Lopez

Personal details
- Born: 1949 (age 76–77) Monterrey, Mexico
- Party: Democratic
- Relatives: Patti Solis Doyle (sister)

Daniel Solis is an American politician from Illinois. He served as an alderman on the Chicago City Council from 1996 to 2019. He represented Chicago's 25th Ward which includes the Lower West Side.

His sister is Patti Solis Doyle, who was Hillary Clinton's former campaign manager. Solis was a member of Clinton's Illinois Steering Committee.

== Early life and career ==
Solis was born in 1949 in Monterrey, Mexico. When he was six, he emigrated to the United States with his mother. His father had already come to the country in seek of work.

Solis began his career as a schoolteacher. He was the founder and executive director of Latino Youth High School as well as the executive director of the Pilsen Neighbors Community Council. Later, he was co-founder and executive director of the United Neighborhood Organization (UNO) where he led a successful campaign to help 12,000 immigrants become naturalized citizens and register to vote. He also led grassroots reform for the Chicago Public Schools by helping organize a campaign to enlist parents and community members to run in the first Local School Council elections.

== Political career ==
Mayor Richard M. Daley appointed Solis to the Chicago Housing Authority Board of Commissioners and the Regional Transportation Authority in 1995. In 1996, after alderman Antonio Medrano pleaded guilty to corruption charges, Solis was appointed to the seat by Mayor Daley. He won a special election in February 1997 to serve out Medrano's term with 77% of the vote.

One of Solis's first actions was to present Angelo J. LaPietra, the founder of the Old Neighborhood Italian American Club at 31st and Shields, a plaque and reward that recognized him as the leader of the community and 25th Ward.

As alderman, Solis focused on job creation and physical improvements in the 25th Ward (Lower West Side) such as expanded National Museum of Mexican Art in Pilsen, the Ping Tom Memorial Park in Chinatown, and a rehabilitation of the Archer Court Senior housing development. Solis also encouraged and negotiated with the International Produce Market and American Linen Company to stay and/or locate in the 25th Ward's Planned Manufacturing District (PMD) which has brought and continues to bring jobs and capital to the community.

Throughout his career as alderman, Solis had been an ally of Mayor Daley and in 2001 was appointed President Pro Tempore of the city council, allowing him to oversee council proceedings in the mayor's absence.

Solis served on seven committees: Aviation, Budget and Government Operations; Committees, Rules and Ethics; Finance; Education; Health; Human Relations; Public Safety.

== Scandal and FBI cooperation ==
In November 2018, Solis announced that he would not seek re-election to his seat. Shortly after his retirement announcement, it was reported that Solis was secretly recording fellow alderman Ed Burke, who had been charged with corruption. Court filings used to obtain search warrants at Solis’ home indicated that Solis had also recorded the Speaker of the Illinois House of Representatives, Michael Madigan. An investigation uncovered that Solis had paid himself hundreds of thousands of dollars out of his political campaign fund. Conversations which Solis recorded between himself and Madigan would ultimately lead to Madigan being convicted in February 2025 on numerous charges related to his efforts to give Solis and his daughter paid state positions and Madigan's use Solis to aid his private law firm. Solis would also provide several days of testimony against Madigan during Madigan's trial as well.

In April 2025, the acting U.S. Attorney in Chicago asked that bribery charges against Solis be dismissed, noting that his cooperation was vital in securing the convictions of both Madigan and Burke. In May 2025 prosecutors would dismiss criminal bribery charges against Solis.
