= Charlotte Beers =

American businesswoman

2nd Under Secretary of State for Public Diplomacy and Public Affairs
- In office October 2, 2001 – March 28, 2003
- President: George W. Bush
- Preceded by: Evelyn S. Lieberman
- Succeeded by: Margaret D. Tutwiler

Personal details
- Education: Baylor University; University of Louisiana (BS)

Charlotte Beers is an American businesswoman and former under secretary of state for public diplomacy and public affairs in the George W. Bush administration.

Beers was the first female vice-president at the JWT advertising firm, then CEO of Tatham-Laird & Kudner until 1992, and finally CEO of Ogilvy & Mather until 1996. In 1997, Fortune magazine placed her on the cover of their first issue to feature the most powerful women in America, for her achievements in the advertising industry. In 1999, Beers received the "Legend in Leadership Award" from the Chief Executive Leadership Institute of the Yale School of Management. As an advertising executive, she ran a number of prominent ad campaigns for national brands including Uncle Ben's rice and American Express.

From October 2001 until March 2003, she worked in the Bush administration as the under secretary for public diplomacy and public affairs in the aftermath of the 9/11 attacks. While under secretary, Beers led the U.S. State Department's efforts to produce propaganda videos intending to sell a “new” America to Muslims around the world by showing that American Muslims were living happily and freely in post-9/11 America. The $15 million Shared Values Initiative produced five mini-documentaries for television, radio, and print with shared values messages for key Muslim countries. Less than a month after the release of the Shared Values Initiative, the State Department abruptly discontinued it.

Beers attended Baylor University and graduated from the University of Louisiana at Lafayette, then called the University of Southwestern Louisiana, with a Bachelor of Science in liberal arts. She grew up in Beaumont, Texas.
