= Shared Values Initiative =

A print flier created for the Council of American Muslims for Understanding, a press relations front group created and funded by the US State Department.

The Shared Values Initiative was a public relations campaign created by the U.S. State Department and directed by Charlotte Beers, a former Madison Avenue advertising executive, to persuade viewers to be more aware, open and accepting of America by dispelling myths about the treatment of Muslims. The propaganda campaign was launched soon after September 11, 2001 and was intended to sell a “new” America to Muslims around the world by showing that American Muslims were living happily and freely in America without persecution. Although initially thought to be a success by the U.S. Government and Charlotte Beers’ team, the $15 million initiative was regarded as a failure.

== Phases of the Shared Values Initiative ==
The campaign was divided in phases; the first of which consisted of five mini-documentaries for television, radio, and print with shared values messages for key Muslim countries. The videos feature “Real Muslim Americans,” participating in their daily activities. $5 million of commercial airtime was purchased with the consent of the government in carefully considered Middle Eastern and Asian countries during Ramadan. Other phases of the Shared Values Initiative included speaking tours throughout Kuwait, Lebanon, Jordan, and Indonesia. Although speaking tours were allowed in these countries, government-run television channels in Egypt, Lebanon, and Jordan refused to run the ads.

The campaign also created a promotional website, www.opendialogue.com, that claimed to feature genuine thoughts and stories from Muslim Americans living as immigrants. The website encouraged users to share their own stories with an entry form, although it appears no user-generated stories were ever shared.

== CAMU (Council of American Muslims for Understanding) ==
Each video in the Shared Values Initiative ended with the tag line “Presented by the Council of American Muslims for Understanding… and the American people,” however, very few Americans knew anything about the campaign: CAMU was a “third party authenticity”—a public relations front group funded by the U.S. State Department specifically for this initiative. It was created in April 2002 by Malik Hasan, chairman of CAMU, who admits that the idea came from the State Department.

== Failure of the Shared Values Initiative ==
The campaign's failure can be attributed to many different factors. In "The semantics and ethics of propaganda" Jay Black argues that the Shared Values Initiative was a failure because “persuasive media that [is] propagandistic […] would seem to be less likely to attract and convince open-minded media consumer than to reinforce the biases of the closed-minded true believers.” The campaign's strategies were unsuccessful first and foremost due to an unreceptive audience. Christopher Simpson attributed the campaign's failure to Beers' lack of PR experience: "selling a product is simply not the same as promoting a belief." Beers was an advertising executive before working in Public Relations, and thus had little experience dealing with changing fundamental beliefs. Others simply said that because the Shared Values Initiative was the first of its kind, it “failed” because there were no past efforts with which to compare it, or measure its success.

Jami Fullerton and Alice Kendrick conducted a study to evaluate the changed perceptions of viewers after watching videos from the SVI campaign, and subsequently determine the success of the SVI campaign. The sample was more than 500 non American college students, only 5.8% of whom were Muslim. The second sample was taken with 17% of those interviewed being Muslim. The data reported that after watching the videos, those interviewed were more likely to think that Muslims in America were treated fairly and able to live their lives how they want. Students also had more positive attitudes toward the U.S. government and its people.

== Charlotte Beers' resignation ==
Less than a month after the release of the Shared Values Initiative, the State Department abruptly discontinued it. Two weeks before the U.S. invasion of Iraq, Charlotte Beers resigned. Inside Magazine commented thus: “She couldn’t do for Uncle Sam’s what she did for Uncle Ben's rice and so, after just 17 months on the job, and on the eve of war, the advertising whiz who became undersecretary of state for public diplomacy has quit, reportedly for health reasons…”
