= Kitchen Cabinet =

Group of unofficial or private advisers to a political leader

A Kitchen Cabinet is a group of unofficial or private advisors to a political leader. The term was originally used by political opponents of President of the United States Andrew Jackson to describe his ginger group, the collection of unofficial advisors he consulted in parallel to the United States Cabinet (the "parlor cabinet") following his purge of the cabinet at the end of the Eaton affair and his break with Vice President John C. Calhoun in 1831.

The Oxford English Dictionary says that the term is "in early use depreciative, with the implication that the group wields undue influence". Its illustrative quotations show the term in use in American sources from 1832, in a British source referring to American politics in 1952, in relation to British politics in 1969, and in an American source discussing Israeli politics in 2006.

== Background ==
Secretary of State Martin Van Buren was a widower, and since he had no wife to become involved in the Eaton controversy, he managed to avoid becoming entangled himself. In 1831 he resigned his cabinet post, as did Secretary of War John Eaton, in order to give Jackson a reason to re-order his cabinet and dismiss Calhoun allies. Jackson then dismissed Calhounites Samuel D. Ingham, John Branch, and John M. Berrien. Van Buren, whom Jackson had already indicated he wanted to run for vice president in 1832, remained in Washington as a member of the Kitchen Cabinet until he was appointed as Minister to Great Britain. Eaton was subsequently appointed Governor of Florida Territory.

Jackson's Kitchen Cabinet included his longtime political allies Martin Van Buren, Francis Preston Blair, Amos Kendall, William B. Lewis, Andrew Jackson Donelson, John Overton, Isaac Hill, and Roger B. Taney. As newspapermen, Blair and Kendall were given particular notice by rival papers.

Blair was Kendall's successor as editor of the Jacksonian Argus of Western America, the prominent pro-New Court newspaper of Kentucky. Jackson brought Blair to Washington, D.C. to counter Calhounite Duff Green, editor of The United States Telegraph, with a new paper, the Globe. Lewis had been quartermaster under Jackson during the War of 1812; Andrew Donelson was Jackson's adoptive son and private secretary; and Overton was Andrew Jackson's friend and business partner since the 1790s.

== Coinage ==
The first known appearance of the term is in correspondence by Bank of the United States head Nicholas Biddle, who wrote of the presidential advisors that "the kitchen ... predominate[s] over the Parlor."

U.S. Senator George Poindexter, who had previously been cordial with Jackson, began criticizing his choice of advisors in August 1831, writing that Jackson "lends his ear too readily to individuals near his person, who are incompetent to advise him, and unworthy of public confidence." The first appearance of "Kitchen Cabinet" in publication was by Poindexter in an article in the Calhounite Telegraph of March 13, 1832, defending his vote against Van Buren as minister to Great Britain:

The President's press, edited under his own eye, by a 'pair of deserters from the Clay party' [Kendall and Blair] and a few others, familiarly known by the appellation of the 'Kitchen Cabinet,' is made the common reservoir of all the petty slanders which find a place in the most degraded prints of the Union.

Jackson's originally kitchen cabinet was not a team of rivals or a loosely organized brain trust but a cohort of loyalists and "patronage dispensers" who, according to historian Daniel Walker Howe, "performed only such functions as the president directed...an informal, flexible group of advisors with no power base other than his favor suited his executive style, allowing him to keep power in his own hands, and, as historian Richard Latner has pointed out, 'to dominate his surroundings.'" According to historian Louis Harlan, Jackson did not trust "professional, compromising politicians, and always surrounded himself with amateur politicians of the subservient, personally loyal variety." The domestic implication of the name "kitchen cabinet" may be related to the fact that many of his advisors, for instance William B. Lewis and John H. Eaton, had either long-standing personal ties to Jackson.

== Uses in government ==
=== Australia ===
Former Prime Minister Kevin Rudd's reliance on a kitchen cabinet (Treasurer Wayne Swan, Rudd's successor Julia Gillard and Finance Minister Lindsay Tanner) was a factor in his removal as Prime Minister. Starting February 2012, Kitchen Cabinet is a TV entertainment series hosted by political commentator Annabel Crabb, in which she interviews notable Australian politicians while preparing and sharing meals with them.

=== Canada ===
During the negotiations preceding the 1982 patriation of the Constitution of Canada, the crucial agreement to create the notwithstanding clause was reached during a meeting between one federal and two provincial justice ministers in the actual kitchen of the Government Conference Centre in Ottawa. That agreement became known as the Kitchen Accord and its authors, Jean Chrétien from the federal government, Roy Romanow from Saskatchewan, and Roy McMurtry from Ontario, became known as the Kitchen Cabinet.

=== India ===
In India, the quasi-governmental body formerly headed by Sonia Gandhi, called the National Advisory Council, was often referred to as a "Kitchen Cabinet" by the media and general public, although the government at that time was headed by Manmohan Singh as prime minister.

=== Israel ===
In Israel, the term "kitchen cabinet" is commonly used to translate the Hebrew term המטבחון (HaMitbahon or HaMitbachon), which more literally translates to "the kitchenette". The term refers to a subset of the Security Cabinet of Israel comprising the Prime Minister's most trusted advisors and derives from former Prime Minister Golda Meir's habit of hosting meetings of her inner circle of ministers at home over cake she had baked personally. While subsequent Prime Ministers have not generally maintained the tradition of literally cooking for their ministers, the sense of an intimate group of trusted advisors has remained current since Meir's premiership.

=== United Kingdom ===
The term was introduced to British politics to describe British Prime Minister Harold Wilson's inner circle during his terms of office (1964-1970 and 1974–1976); prior to Tony Blair, Wilson was the longest-serving Labour Party Prime Minister. Members included Marcia Williams, George Wigg, Joe Haines, and Bernard Donoughue. The term has been used subsequently, especially under Tony Blair, for the sidelining of traditional democratic cabinet structures to rely far more on a close group of non-elected advisors and allies. Examples of this practice include Blair's reliance on advisor Andrew Adonis before his appointment to the cabinet.

=== United States ===
In colloquial U.S. usage, "kitchen cabinet" refers to any group of trusted friends and associates, particularly in reference to a president's or presidential candidate's closest unofficial advisers.

- Theodore Roosevelt's variant was called the "tennis cabinet". These group of friends, diplomats and informal advisors would actually accompany the president and play tennis regularly on the lawn outside the White House.
- Clark Clifford was considered a member of the kitchen cabinet for John F. Kennedy and Lyndon B. Johnson before he was appointed Secretary of Defense. Robert F. Kennedy was uniquely considered to be a kitchen cabinet member as well as a Cabinet member while he was his brother's Attorney General.
- Gerald Ford had a kitchen cabinet while vice president, which he continued to seek advice from after he assumed the presidency in August 1974. The group included Melvin Laird, Bryce Harlow, William Scranton, Robert Griffin, and Donald Rumsfeld.
- Ronald Reagan had a kitchen cabinet of allies and friends from California who advised him during his terms. This group of ten to twelve businessmen were all strong proponents of the free enterprise system. His California backers included Karl Bendetsen, Alfred Bloomingdale, Earl Brian, Justin Whitlock Dart, William French Smith, Charles Wick, oilman William A. Wilson, auto dealer Holmes Tuttle, beer baron Joseph Coors, steel magnate and philanthropist Earle Jorgensen, and about three to five others including Samuel Stuart Bretzfield. Coors was the major funder and most active participant. He also funded many think tanks and policy institutes at about this time, including The Heritage Foundation.
- Donald Trump's kitchen cabinet set-up went hand in hand with an "apparent relegation of the National Security Council staff to a secondary status, and the placing of the executive national security agencies at an even further remove from the national security decision-making process."

== Uses in business ==
Lisa Yoon extends use of the term "Kitchen Cabinet" to "a network of trusted advisers" who influence the decisions of corporate presidents and potentates.

== See also ==
- Black Cabinet
- Brain Trust
- Camarilla
- Medicine ball cabinet
