= Steve Rabinowitz =

American political activist (born 1957)

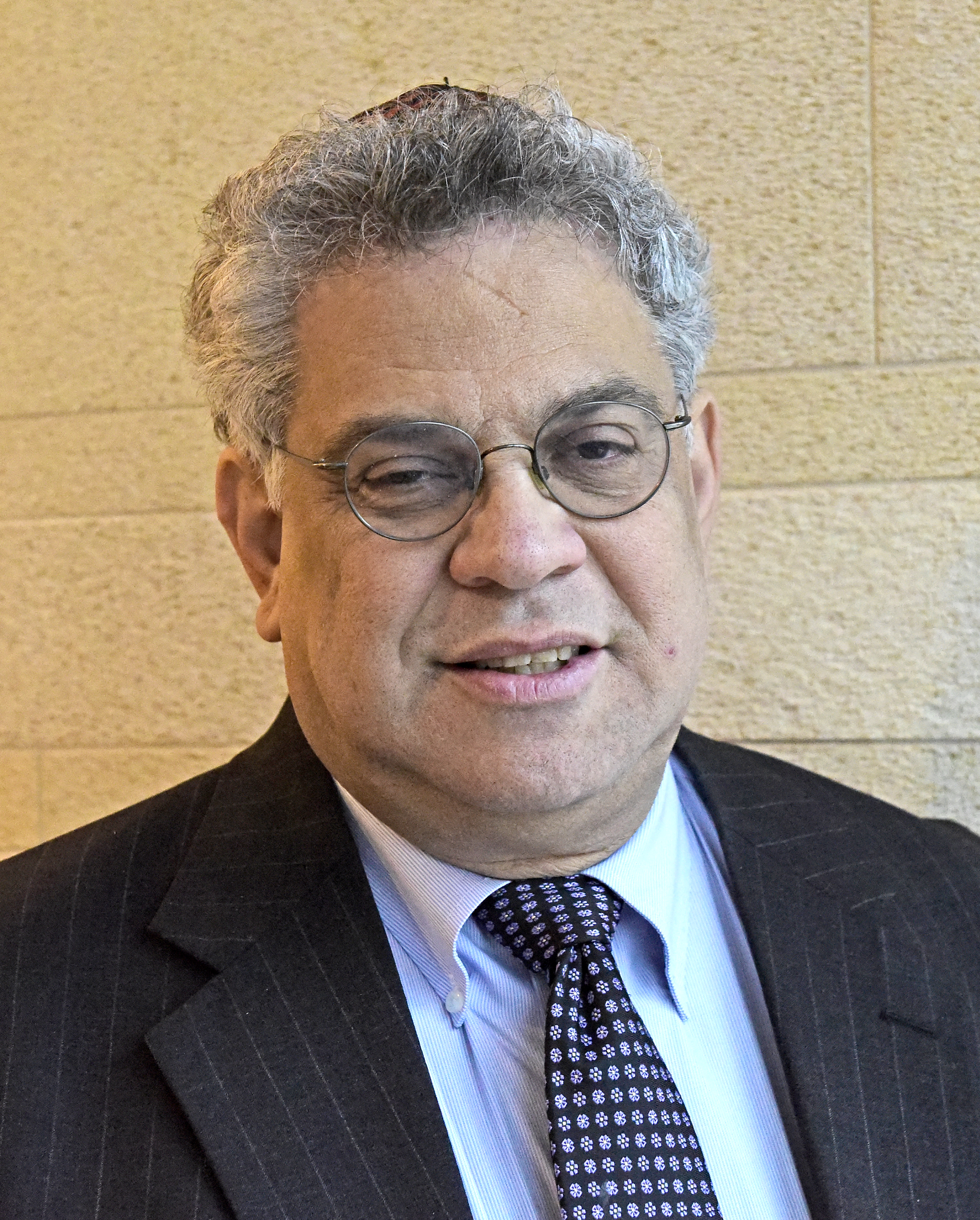
- Born: January 17, 1957 (age 69); Tucson, Arizona, United States
- Occupation: President
- Known for: Political publicist, founder of Bluelight Strategies
- Political party: Democratic

Steven M. Rabinowitz (born January 17, 1957) is a political image maker, media strategist, publicist, and event planner whose primary work is for Democratic and Jewish causes. He is frequently quoted in U.S., Israeli and Jewish news media, and has had opinion pieces appear in numerous outlets.

In 2004, the Jewish Forward named him among the 50 most influential Jews in America. Eleven years later, JTA called his firm “the lead public relations outfit handling Jewish communal accounts.”

A former Bill Clinton White House press aide, he founded Bluelight Strategies in late 2014 with longtime colleague and Capitol Hill veteran Aaron Keyak, as a successor to Rabinowitz Communications and Rabinowitz/Dorf Communications.

Rabinowitz served in the national staffs of nine U.S. presidential campaigns, as well as campaigns for most levels of U.S. political office, from U.S. Senate to county sheriff.

At Bluelight, where he serves as president, Rabinowitz was a founder of Jews for Progress, a pro-Israel super PAC to boost support for 2016 Democratic presidential nominee Hillary Clinton among Jews in swing states. In 2012, Rabinowitz was instrumental in creating The Hub, which worked to ensure the Jewish vote for President Barack Obama's reelection. And in 2020, he supported his colleague Aaron Keyak, who left their firm to work full-time for Joe Biden as his Jewish liaison on the presidential campaign and in the transition and since.

== Biography ==
Steve Rabinowitz, the only child of the late Dorothy and Harold Rabinowitz, grew up in Tucson, Arizona. He attended Tucson High School and the University of Arizona. He and his wife, Laurie Moskowitz, Principal at Lore Strategies, the campaign advocacy, coalition building and partnerships consulting firm, and former senior director for U.S. campaigns at the ONE Campaign, live in Washington, D.C., with their two sons, Jake and Sammy.

== Political career ==
Rabinowitz was national youth coordinator for Democrat Mo Udall's presidential campaign. He subsequently worked on the paid national staffs of the presidential campaigns of Jerry Brown, John Anderson, Gary Hart, Walter Mondale, Paul Simon, Michael Dukakis, Bob Kerrey, and Bill Clinton. He headed Bill Clinton's 1992 campaign press advance team, During that campaign cycle, he became widely known as "the rabbi," a play on his last name, hosting the Yom Kippur break fast at his rented home in Little Rock, Arkansas. Hillary Clinton credits Rabinowitz with coming up with the term Hillaryland.

During the 1992 Bill Clinton campaign and working with his colleague Jeff Eller, Rabinowitz helped remake the classic political town hall meeting, routinely placing Clinton in the center of a "bowl" of seated voters, surrounded and tiered on at least three sides, while Eller worked with local television stations for live regional and even national broadcast, and Clinton left the stool in the center of the audience and engaged individual, unscripted questioners, regardless of where they sat or the camera angle it produced. The format has been repeated hundreds of times since, including by Pres. Biden and VP Kamala Harris.

In addition, Rabinowitz worked with Israeli venture capitalist and then-Member of Knesset Erel Margalit when the Israeli sought his party’s leadership. Rabinowitz also previously and widely reportedly advised the Israeli Labor Party there and several of its leaders on Western campaign techniques in the 1990’s.

== The White House ==
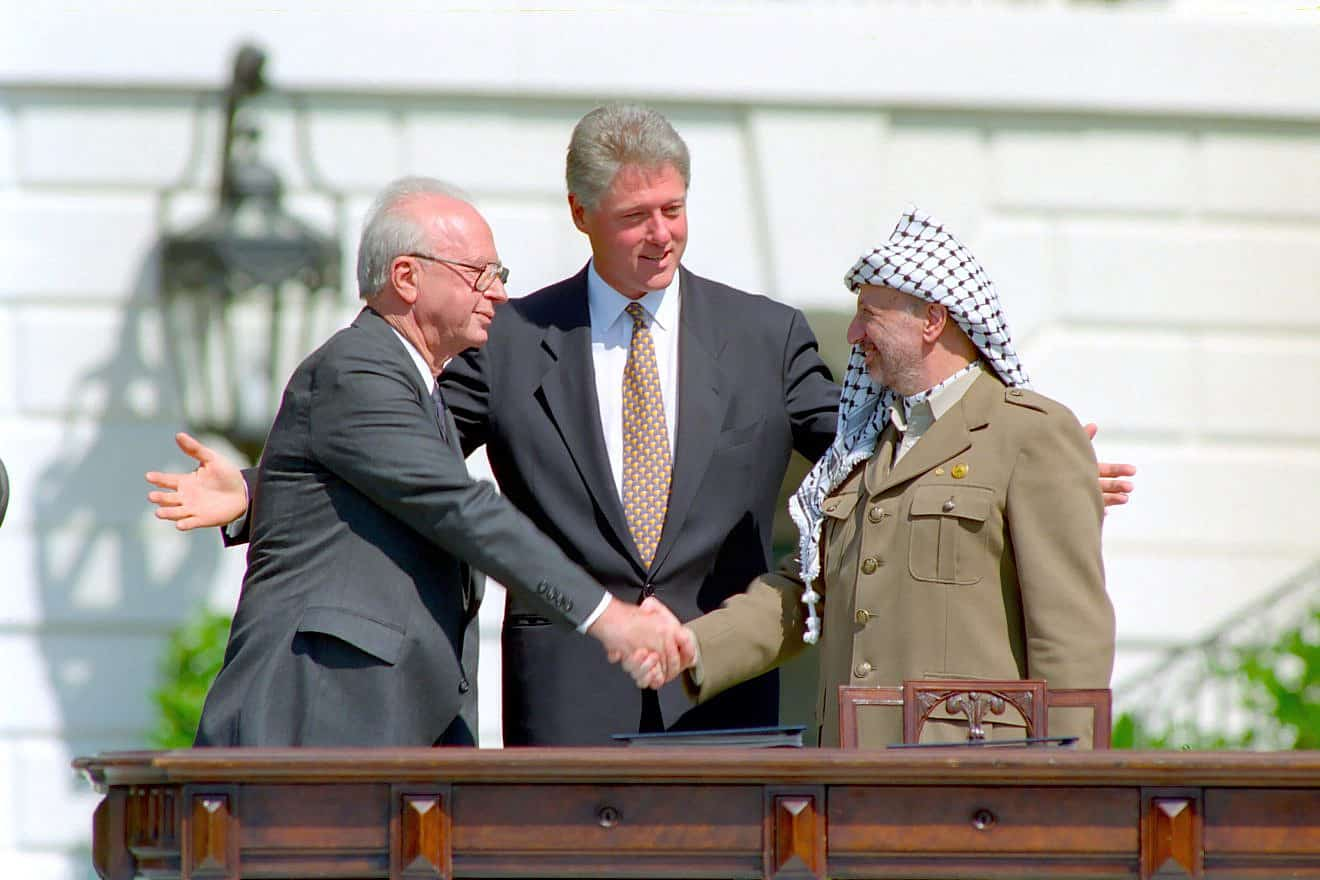
Israeli Prime Minister Yitzhak Rabin, U.S. President Bill Clinton, and Yasser Arafat at the Oslo Accords signing ceremony on September 13, 1993. Rabinowitz produced the press logistics for all the U.S. and foreign media.

In 1993, Rabinowitz was named Bill Clinton's White House director of media planning. He helped produce the peace treaty signings between Israel and the Palestinians on the White House South Lawn in September 1993, and between Israel and Jordan in the Arava in October 1994.

He also produced an East Room presidential signing of the North American Free Trade Agreement (NAFTA), witnessed by three of Clinton's predecessors – Presidents George H. W. Bush, Jimmy Carter and Gerald Ford.

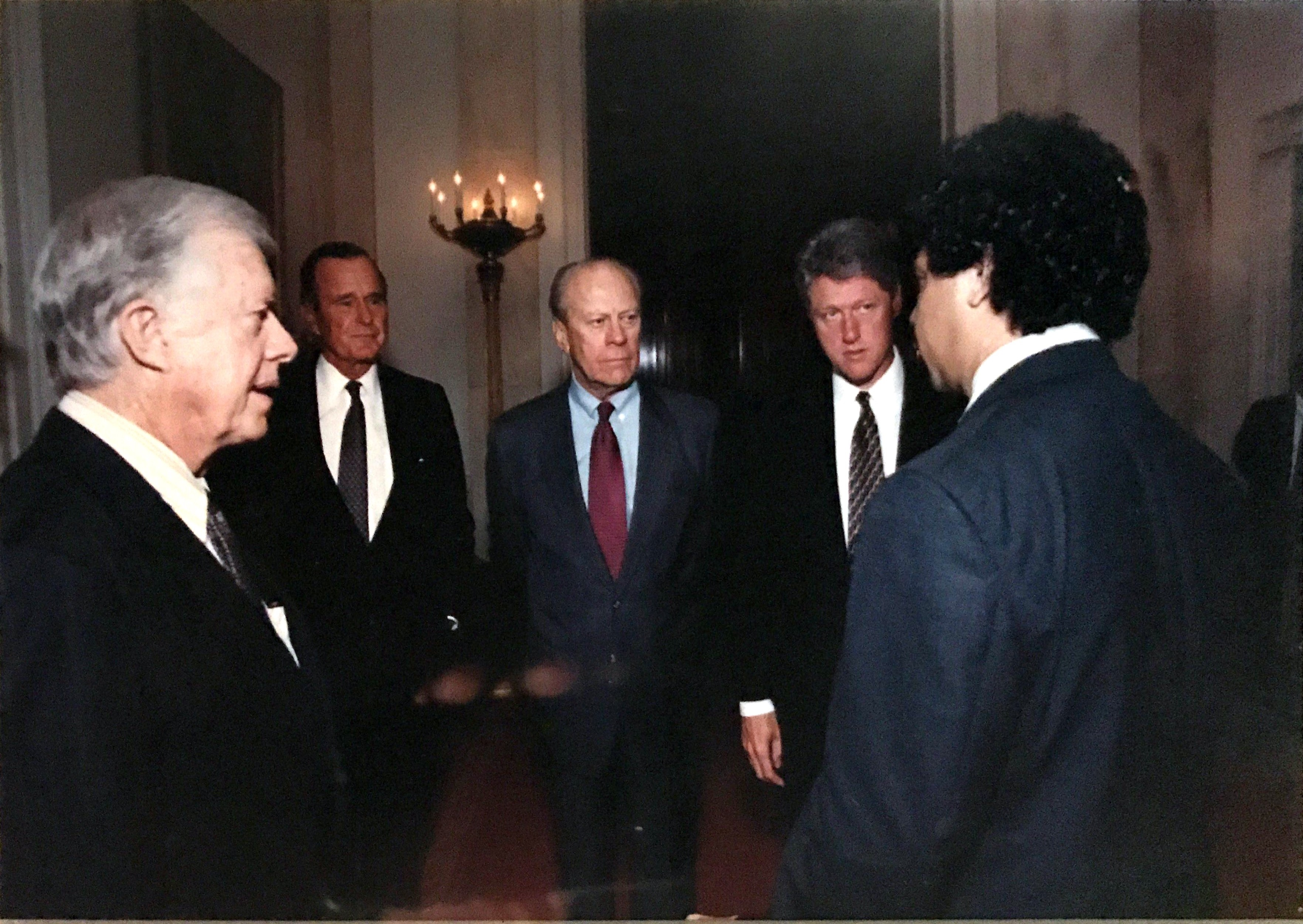
Steve Rabinowitz with Presidents (left to right) Jimmy Carter, George H.W. Bush, Gerald Ford and Bill Clinton September 14, 1993 (White House photo/Robert McNeely)

Also in 1993, Rabinowitz organized and led the first White House Passover seder for 50 Clinton White House and Administration staff. The traditional event was held in the Indian Treaty Room and catered kosher.

== The Hub ==
During Obama's 2012 reelection campaign, Rabinowitz helped create the Jewish Media Hub (The Hub), a political nonprofit directed at boosting the incumbent president's standing among American Jews.

In 2014, Rabinowitz, Aaron Keyak, Marc Stanley, and Fran Katz Watson launched Jewish Americans Ready for Hillary to support a 2016 presidential run for Hillary Clinton in the Jewish community.

In 2016, Rabinowitz helped kick off and run Jews for Progress, a political action committee created to defend Hillary Clinton and persuade Jewish voters in swing states to support her. Employing tactics much like those used in The Hub, the No Nukes for Iran Project, which Rabinowitz advised and that supported the Obama administration's nuclear agreement with Iran, and Jews for Progress both used video, print, online and social media advertising and phones to target Jewish voters and influentials. In the case of Jews for Progress, polling showed a subsequent increase in the Jewish vote for Clinton over that for Barack Obama four years earlier, as all other Democratic Party base groups' votes dropped. Rabinowitz also often volunteered alongside his former business partner Keyak, the Joe Biden Jewish liaison, where helpful, both on the 2020 general election campaign and in the subsequent presidential transition, to some extent.

Rabinowitz served on the paid national staffs of nine presidential campaigns, and was an informal adviser to the presidential campaigns of the Bill Clinton re-elect in 1996, Al Gore in 2000, John Kerry in 2004, both Hillary Clinton campaigns (2008 and 2016), and both Barack Obama campaigns (2008 and 2012). He produced Al Gore's official announcement for president in his hometown of Carthage, Tennessee in 2000. Rabinowitz was a paid staffer for Jim Florio and Peter Shapiro, both for governor of New Jersey, Carolyn Warner for governor of Arizona, and Pat Leahy for re-election to the U.S. Senate from Vermont. And in 1980 Rabinowitz ran for office himself– unsuccessfully – seeking the school board in the Catalina Foothills School District in northern Tucson.

Long the pro-bono communications director and a board member of the now defunct National Jewish Democratic Council, he, Keyak, Stanley, Katz Watson and former Congressman Ron Klein founded the Jewish Democratic Council of America (JDCA), which he and Keyak ran for its first two years.

== QRS NewMedia ==
QRS NewMedia, a company Rabinowitz co-founded with Laura Quinn and Mark Steitz, handled satellite feeds and radio actualities for the 1996 Clinton-Gore campaign. Using technology that Rabinowitz brought to national politics for Bill Clinton in 1992, QRS added census data and Nielsen research on each of the nation's television stations to produce breakdowns of viewing audiences, providing campaigns and political strategists with detailed information, including demographics, lifestyles and family income, on who watches what news program. QRS also has created high-tech media presentations for political, government and corporate entities.

== Media Training ==
Rabinowitz often does media training for nonprofits, political orgs and corporations, and has taught political communications and crisis management at The George Washington University School of Media and Public Affairs and in the graduate schools at Johns Hopkins University.

== Crisis Communications ==
In addition to teaching crisis communications, Rabinowitz has handled political crisis management for campaigns, officeholders and individuals running for office, as well as guiding numerous nonprofits and synagogues facing various crises. While most required discrete and only private communication, others were much higher profile – among them Hadassah, the Women's Zionist Organization of America, which reportedly and innocently lost tens of millions of dollars in the Bernard Madoff Ponzi scheme investment scandal of 1998. The organization reportedly lost $90 million, and Hadassah officials were unwilling to immediately be forthcoming about its full exposures in the scandal. Rabinowitz served as its media strategist and sole intermediary with the press. Subsequent mini-crises involved Hadassah's agreement to pay $45 million in clawback claims, the staggering $300 million debt and near bankruptcy of its legendary Jerusalem hospital on Mount Scopus, its selling off of many of its properties in Israel and Manhattan, the spinning off of it youth group Young Judaea and their popular summer camps, and the considerable staff reduction and closing of 16 of its offices including the Washington, D.C. office.

== Major Jewish/Pro-Israel Events ==
Rabinowitz helped organize a 2002 Israel rally in Washington, DC, on the West Front of the Capitol that drew an estimated crowd of 100,000 and the Israel@60 celebration on the National Mall in 2008. The Israel@60 celebration featured a wide range of performers. Rabinowitz assisted with traditional advertising and guerilla marketing for the event, attracting 50,000-75,000 people. And in July, he was brought back to the Capitol to help ensure as broad a coalition as possible for a much more modest rally against antisemitism that ultimately enjoyed nearly 100 co-sponsors.

== Religious Pluralism in Israel ==
The pluralism wars in Israel took off with the conversion crisis over the status of non-Orthodox conversions in an Israeli Supreme Court case of 1996 and continued with the Ne'eman Commission on religious councils, a strengthening of the Law of Return, the fight for new egalitarian or pluralistic sections of the Kotel (Western Wall), the advent and growth of Women of the Wall, and with arguments over marriage, divorce, burial and the very question of Who is a Jew. Through it all, Rabinowitz was a media advisor to both the Reform and Conservative movements of Judaism and to the Jewish Federations of North America, all major players in the debate, and often, all at the same time. He has sometimes advised the New Israel Fund as well.

== The Dalai Lama ==
Since the mid-1990's and usually in coordination with the International Campaign for Tibet, Rabinowitz has many times helped coordinate media logistics for visits to Washington, D.C. of the Dalai Lama, often serving as his primary press contact. And in 2009, the Dalai Lama visited Adas Israel Congregation, the Conservative movement synagogue in Washington where Rabinowitz and his family worship, to bless the new sukkah Rabinowitz had just engineered on the synagogue's west front. One day earlier, the Dalai Lama presented Rabinowitz with a khata, the ceremonial Tibetan Buddhist scarf, during a private audience.

== Qatar ==
Rabinowitz has done considerable work on efforts to oppose Qatar. He and his firm were responsible for media and helped organize the Qatar Global Security & Stability Conference, a 2017 confab in London, assisting in securing speakers, staging the high-profile event and widely publicizing it.

He also helped publicize a Foundation for Defense of Democracies conference five years ago, Qatar and the Muslim Brotherhood's Global Affiliates: New U.S. Administration Considers New Policies, with former Secretary of Defense Robert Gates, and was responsible for the media strategy and publicity for a similar Hudson Institute event on Qatar, with former Defense Secretary Leon Panetta and former Director of the CIA General David Petraeus. Additionally, he organized and publicized a press conference in June, 2017 for Egyptian journalist Mohamed Fahmy, who is suing the Qatari-funded Al Jazeera, and publicized a protest outside the Qatari Embassy in Washington by the local Jewish community.

Rabinowitz and his firm worked on another international forum on sports integrity in London several years ago, that, among other things, explored the propriety of how Russia and Qatar so unusually came to host the 2018 and 2022 FIFA World Cup.

== The Environment ==
Over the years, Rabinowitz has worked on quite a number of different environment-oriented projects and clients, including Earth Justice in upstate New York, outside Ithaca, where he worked with a group of community activists who sought to ban fracking in the town of Dryden.

From 2001 to 2006, Rabinowitz Communications worked with the Union of Concerned Scientists on, on a minimum five different projects. These included campaigns around fuel economy, clean and hybrid vehicles, global warming, John Bolton’s nomination for U.S. ambassador to the United Nations and grass-fed beef and dairy cattle.

For the Jewish Council for Public Affairs (JCPA) and its Coalition on the Environment and Jewish Life (COEJL), Rabinowitz wrote op-eds and generated multiple news stories. And he worked with the Wilderness Society to support a Clinton Administration initiative to put and keep one-third of national forest land off limits to new development.

== Music/Movie promoter ==
In the 1980s and between political campaigns, Rabinowitz worked as a music promoter in Tucson, Arizona, producing concerts, music festivals and shows, an extended play (EP) Rock & Roll record and a Country Punk cassette tape, as well as radio shows, all featuring local bands.

In 1984, Rabinowitz was a member of a Universal Pictures team managing the openings of its controversial film The Last Temptation of Christ around the country. They coordinated local media coverage and worked with various theater management and local police to contain the protests; when protests began to wane, they worked to generate larger, media-enticing demonstrations. Rabinowitz also organized the Washington premier of director Spike Lee's 1989 movie Do The Right Thing.

Recently, Rabinowitz briefly promoted Jewzy.tv & Cinema, a relatively new streaming platform featuring almost exclusively Jewish content.

== Board and volunteer service ==
Active at Adas Israel Congregation in Washington, D.C., Rabinowitz was assistant treasurer, having served for years as vice president for membership and external affairs. He also is active in the Conservative movement synagogue's traditional egalitarian minyan. In 2016, he and his wife were honored by the Jewish Primary Day School of the Nation's Capital, where he chaired the annual Rabin lecture for many years. He has served on the executive committee of the National Jewish Democratic Council and of Avodah.

Rabinowitz and Moskowitz have co-hosted yearly kosher fundraising dinners for Sips & Suppers in support of DC Central Kitchen and Martha's Table.

== Latkes & Vodkas ==
His firm's signature annual holiday party, Latkes & Vodkas (a Trademarked name and the first known party to ever be so called), has drawn hundreds of guests each of its 20 years.

== Published articles ==
Rabinowitz has published widely in the American and Jewish press, mainly on political topics. At the close of the Obama presidency, he published his thoughts over "Eight years watching the first Jewish US president."

In April 2021, he reflected upon the death of Bernie Madoff. In August 2020, he discussed what synagogues planning on streaming their High Holiday services could learn from recent political party conventions operating during the COVID-19 pandemic. He has published on why Joe Biden ought be regarded as a mensch, and a hilarious piece mocking former President Donald. J. Trump's messianic pretensions.

== Personal ==
Rabinowitz is married to Laurie Moskowitz. Moskowitz is founder and proprietor of LORE Strategies, specializing in strategy, grassroots organizing and partnerships among campaigns, nonprofits, and business. Previously, Moskowitz founded grassroots organizing and campaign consulting firm FieldWorks and spent seven years at the ONE Campaign as senior director for U.S. campaigns.
