= Lisa Caputo =

American businesswoman

- Education: Brown University (M.S.); Northwestern University
- Occupations: Executive Vice President, Chief Marketing and Communications Officer for The Travelers Companies, Inc.

Lisa Caputo is the executive vice president and chief marketing and communications officer for The Travelers Companies, Inc. She joined Travelers on June 1, 2011. At Travelers, she is a member of the Management and Operating Committees and the Travelers Foundation Board. She leads the company's marketing, research, branding, corporate communications, customer experience and creative services functions and works closely with investor relations and government relations. Previously she was executive vice president of global marketing and corporate affairs for Citigroup. She was the founder, chairman and CEO of Citi's Women & Co. business from January 2000 until 2010. She was a member of Citi's senior leadership committee and is the co-head of Citi's Women's Initiative.

Caputo is also a television commentator and public speaker on current events and politics. She spent over ten years in the public sector, serving as Deputy Assistant to President Clinton and Press Secretary to First Lady Hillary Clinton through President Clinton's first term in office.

== Education ==
Caputo graduated magna cum laude from Brown University with degrees in Political Science and French, and received a master's degree in Journalism with highest distinction from Northwestern University.

== Business career ==
=== The Travelers Companies, Inc. ===
Since joining The Travelers Companies, Inc. in 2011 as its executive vice president and Chief Marketing and Communications Officer, Caputo has overseen the company's marketing, research, branding, creative services, corporate communications and customer experience, strategies and operations. She is a member of the Travelers Foundation Board and is a senior member of their executive management team, serving on their Management and Operating Committees. She has launched the company's social media presence, has spearheaded the creation of the Travelers Risk Index and has developed digital partnerships and campaigns in order to position the company more prominently in the marketplace.

=== Citigroup ===
As Citi's executive vice president of Global Marketing and Corporate Affairs, Caputo managed an integrated marketing, corporate communications and community relations strategy for Citi. She oversaw the marketing, advertising, branding, consumer insights, media, sponsorships, external and internal communications, media relations, issues management, executive communications and community relations operations at Citi. She had management responsibility for approximately 600 people and oversaw over $2 billion in media spent globally. Additionally, she managed the company-wide initiative on the corporate brand which resulted in the re-branding of the company from Citigroup to Citi, and the sale of the red umbrella logo to Travelers. She also directs the development of Citigroup's corporate brand advertising campaign. Citi is one of the top financial services brands and one of the top consumer brands globally.

=== Women & Co. ===
Caputo started Women & Co. when she first joined Citi. Women & Co. is a membership business which provides a host of solutions to address the distinct financial needs of women. Women & Co. offers a range of custom-tailored services to address women's financial issues in their various life stages, which include one-on-one consultation with financial professionals, discounts and special savings on financial offerings, and news and educational opportunities. Caputo grew the business from concept to start up to revenue generator. Today, Women & Co. members accounted for over $30 billion in assets under management at Citi. under Caputo's leadership.

=== Citigroup Global Consumer Group ===
Previously, Caputo was Senior Managing Director, Business Operations and Planning, Citi's Global Consumer Group. In this role, Caputo oversaw community relations, public affairs, internal communications, executive communications and the Office of Financial Education for the Global Consumer Group. Additionally, she served as Chief of Staff to the Global Consumer Group CEO, where she worked with senior managers to develop and implement strategies to expand the business and coordinate business activities across the Global Consumer Group as well as across other Citi businesses. At the request of the Citi CEO, Caputo also developed a strategic plan and organizational structure for the Citi Foundation to focus the company's philanthropic giving.

=== Disney Publishing Worldwide ===
Before joining Citi, Caputo was Vice President of Global Communications and Synergy for Disney Publishing Worldwide from 1998 to 1999. She oversaw communications, publicity and cross promotions and spearheaded the coordination of the group's marketing and advertising efforts to ensure its brands were promoted with consistency. Disney Publishing Worldwide is the publishing subsidiary of the Walt Disney Company which reaches more than 50 million readers worldwide monthly and holds a leading position in children's publishing in all major markets. Around the world, Disney's books and magazines are printed in 37 languages and distributed in more than 100 countries.

=== CBS Corporation ===
Caputo joined Disney after serving as Vice President of Corporate Communications for the CBS Corporation from 1996 to 1998. At CBS, she helped oversee a department which handled issues relating to CBS management, business operations and program publicity. She was also responsible for media relations, special projects and public affairs objectives in all aspects of CBS, and managed the CBS/TIME millennium symposium project, which resulted in the production of a series of nationally broadcast television shows.

=== Television ===
In addition to her posts at Citi, Caputo is a television commentator and public speaker on current events and politics. She is a contributor to O Magazine. She has been an NBC and MSNBC political analyst for the past presidential election cycles and was a contributing editor to George magazine. She also served as a co-host of CNN's Crossfire and CNBC and MSNBC's Equal Time.

== Political career ==
After graduate school, influenced by one of her college professors, Caputo decided to look for a job in government. Caputo was the national issues press secretary during the Dukakis-Bentsen presidential campaign in 1988. She was then press secretary to US Senator Tim Wirth of Colorado, and US Representative Bob Traxler of Michigan. In 1992, at the Democratic National Convention, she ran Al Gore's media operations. After working on the 1992 Clinton-Gore campaign, she was asked to become Hillary Clinton's press secretary, at the age of 27. She oversaw the communications and media relations operations for the First Lady and the First Family and served as chief spokesperson. She also became deputy assistant to President Bill Clinton, and held those positions from 1993 through 1996. She was a senior advisor to Hillary Clinton's presidential campaign in 2008. She was frequently seen on CNN, MSNBC, and other television networks providing analysis on the 2008 and on the 2016 presidential races.

== Organizations ==
Caputo serves on the boards of Best Buy Co., Inc. (Nominating and Governance Committee and Compensation Committee), and is a board member of the following organizations: The J. William Fulbright Foreign Scholarship Program, WNET Channel 13, New Visions for Public Schools, the Creative Coalition. She is a member of the Reuters Editorial Advisory Board, the advisory council on Media Relations for Brown University, the board of advisors of Northwestern University's Medill School, the New York Restoration Project Chairman's Council, the New York Presbyterian Sloane Hospital Advisory Committee. Caputo is a member of the Brookings Institution's Public Sector Leadership Initiative Advisory Board, the Council on Foreign Relations, the Economic Club of New York and the Financial Women's Association.

== Awards and honors ==
Caputo has been selected as the AWNY Advertising Woman of the Year and one of Ad Age's Advertising Women to Watch. She is a NYWICI Matrix Winner for outstanding achievements in the communications industry and has also been recognized as the Direct Marketing International Woman of the Year. Caputo was selected as a Young Global Leader of The World Economic Forum. She was named one of "New York's Rising Stars: 40 under 40" by Crain's New York Business. She was named by Crain's New York Business as one of the six New York women who are emerging as influential. She was also named by Crain's New York Business as one of New York's most connected New Yorkers.

In December 2010, she was named a 2011 winner of the NCAA Silver Anniversary Award, given annually to six former NCAA student-athletes for distinguished career accomplishment on the 25th anniversary of their college graduation. Among her fellow honorees from that class were former NFL and Major League Baseball player Bo Jackson and current New York Yankees manager Joe Girardi.

In December 2016, Caputo was inducted into PRWeek's Hall of Fame in recognition of her "outstanding contribution to the development of the communications industry".

== Personal life ==
Caputo lives in New York with her husband and two children.
