= Medicine Ball Cabinet =

Herbert Hoover's advisory group

Medicine Ball Cabinet was a nickname given to the cabinet and advisors of President Herbert Hoover. The term arose because the president, cabinet members, and advisors would play regular games of Hooverball at the White House, during Hoover's administration.

== See also ==
- Kitchen Cabinet
