= Administrative hearing of William McAndrew =

Educational administrative hearing in Chicago

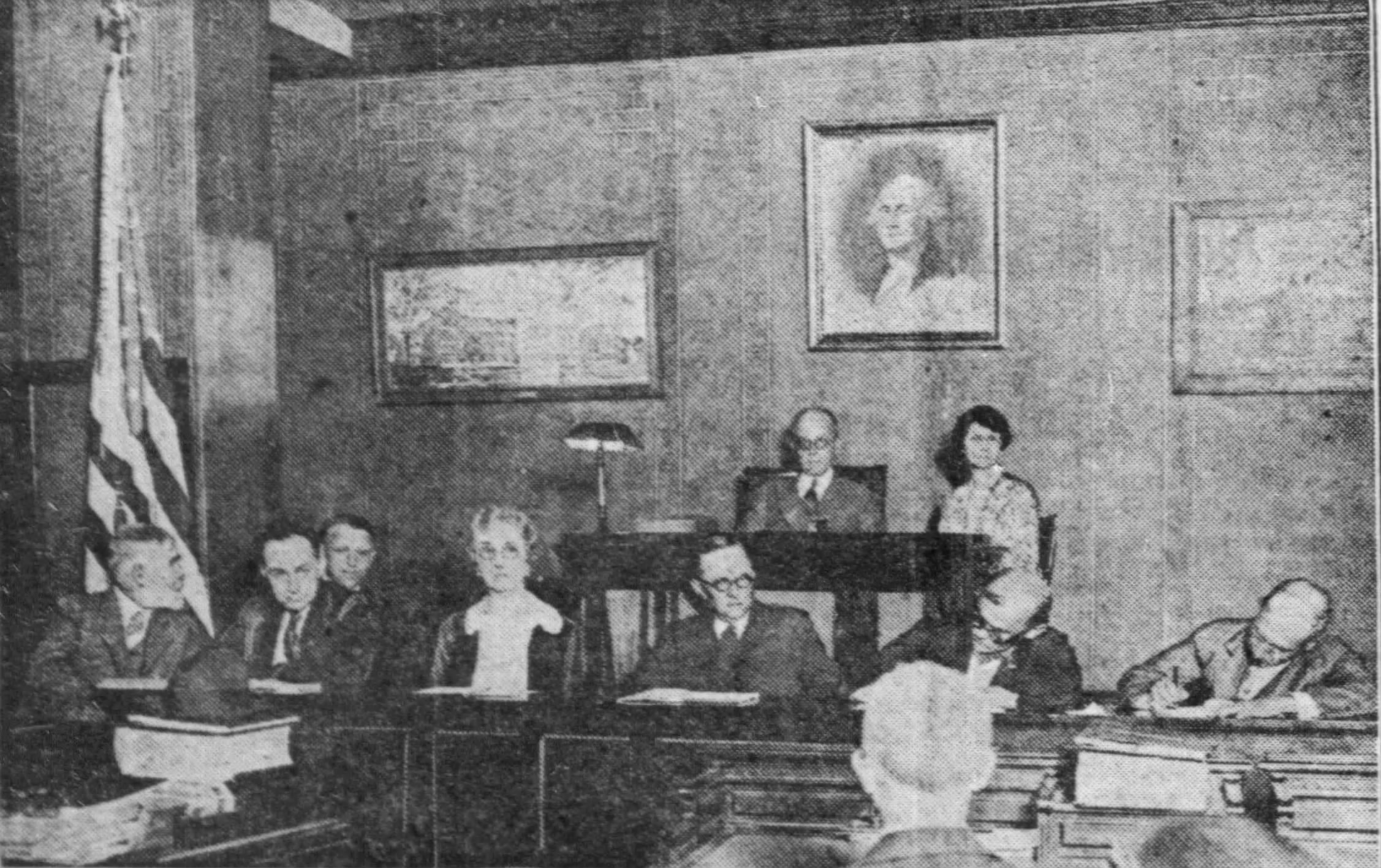
- McAndrew (pictured at far-left) testifying at a session of the administrative hearing in early October 1927
- Court: Chicago Board of Education (administrative hearing venue)
- Started: September 29, 1927
- Decided: March 21, 1928
- Verdict: Guilty

Case history
- Appealed to: Superior Court of Cook County
- Subsequent action: Voided

On August 29, 1927, William McAndrew was suspended from his position as superintendent of Chicago Public Schools by the Chicago Board of Education pending an administrative hearing by the board. He was charged with "insubordination" for opposing a school board action that he believed would amount to reviving patronage in the school system. The administrative hearing, which was widely dubbed a "trial", was to determine whether he was guilty, and should therefore be removed from his office. The administrative hearing, which attracted great national media fascination and derision, took place over the course of several months, and saw McAndrew tried for counts of insubordination, and an additional count of conduct incompatible with and in violation of his duty (stemming from allegations of unpatriotic actions). The hearing was effectively a show trial. After the first several weeks of the hearing, McAndrew and his legal team refused to attend any further sessions and he was tried in absentia. The school board found McAndrew guilty by an 8–2 vote on March 21, 1928. In December 1929, the Superior Court of Cook County voided this, ruling that McAndrew had not been insubordinate, and that the school board had no authority to charge McAndrew for being "unpatriotic".

The administrative hearing came following a reshaping of the board of education with appointments made by William Hale Thompson in the months after he took office in 1927. During his successful campaign against then-incumbent mayor William Emmett Dever in the 1927 Chicago mayoral election, Thompson had promised to oust McAndrew. During the campaign, Thompson had made regular allegations that McAndrew was a British agent sent by King George as part of a grand conspiracy to manipulate the minds of American children and set the groundwork for the United Kingdom to repossess the United States, with Dever being in on this alleged plot. Thompson's allegations came amid a national wave of anglophobic attacks on textbooks. After Thompson was elected mayor, he sought to quickly oust McAndrew, who had nine months left before his contract as superintendent expired. State law stated that the Chicago Board of Education could only dismiss McAndrew after an administrative hearing before the board.

== Background ==
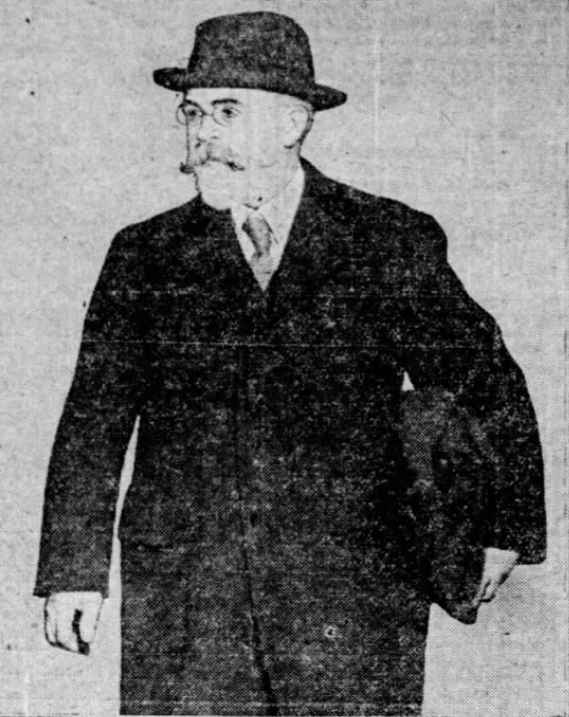
McAndrew in 1924

William McAndrew had been appointed superintendent of Chicago Public Schools in 1924 by a Chicago Board of Education that had been reshaped by reform-minded mayor William Emmett Dever's appointees. The schools had been tarnished by mismanagement under Dever's predecessor William Hale Thompson. During his tenure as superintendent, McAndrew was a polarizing figure, facing tense criticism from teacher's unions and others for some of the reforms he fought to implement, but also receiving national praise.

In the 1920s, the United States experienced a wave of anglophobic criticisms in the of textbooks being "pro-British" and "unamerican". Among the leading forces of these criticisms was the Knights of Columbus.

=== William Hale Thompson's attacks on McAndrew during the 1927 mayoral election ===
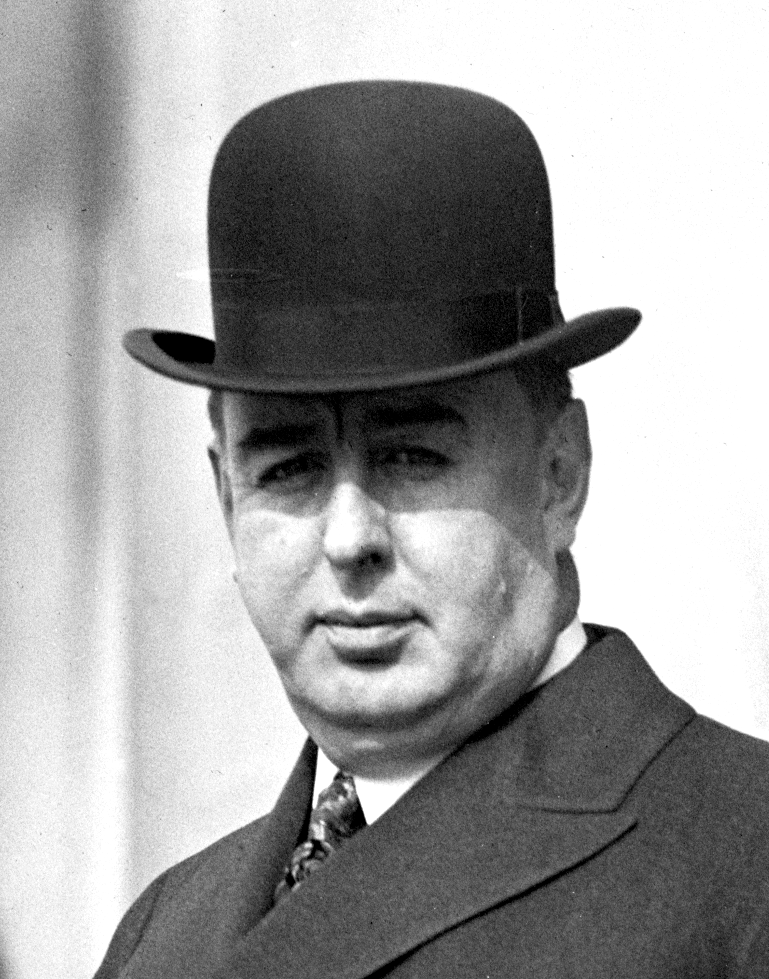
William Hale Thompson

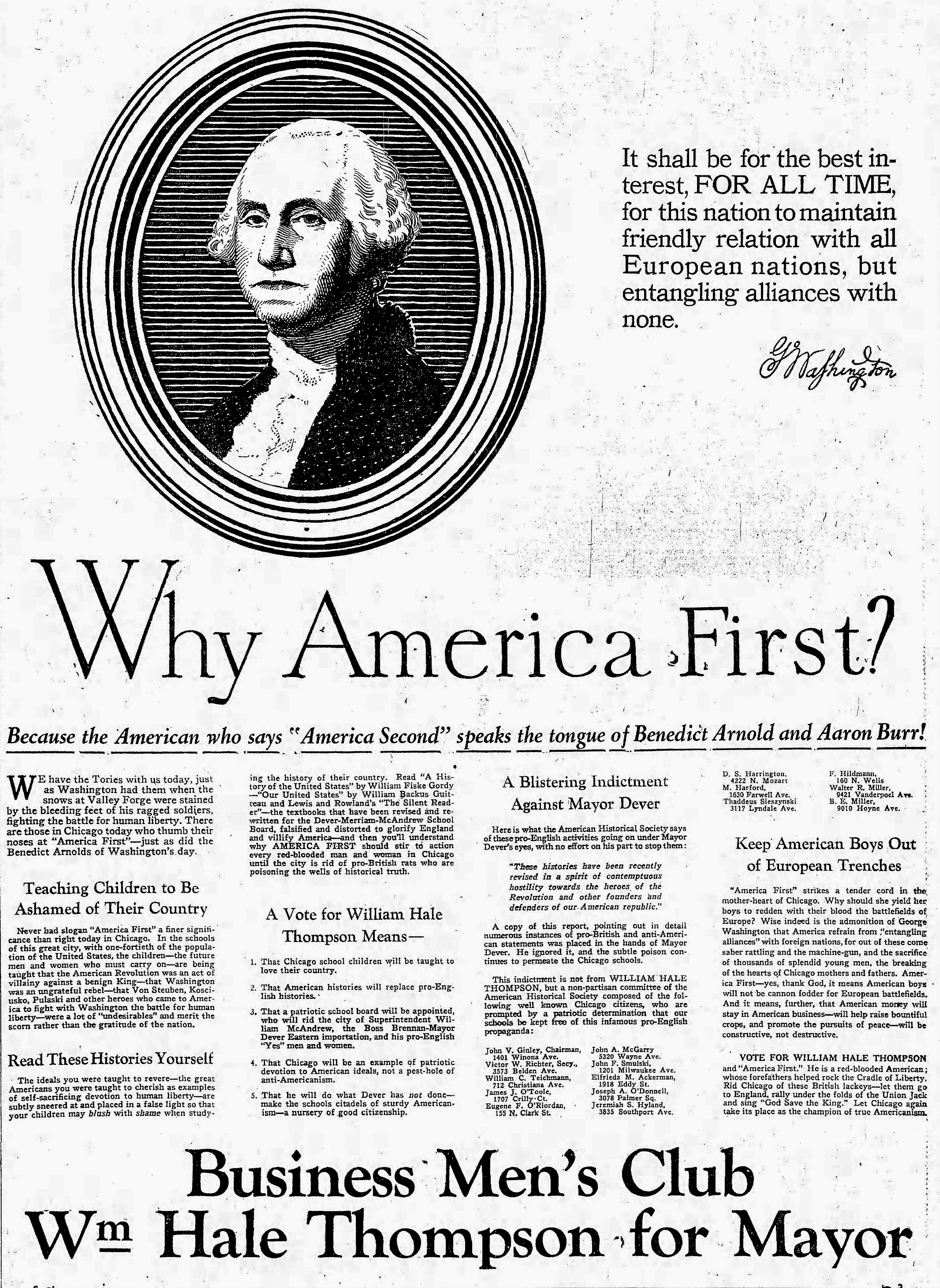
Full-page campaign ad in support of Thompson baring language attacking McAndrew. This full-page ad was run March 30, 1927

During his successful 1927 campaign against incumbent Democratic mayor William Emmett Dever, Republican nominee William Hale Thompson (the former mayor) alleged that McAndrew was a British agent sent by King George as part of a grand conspiracy to manipulate the minds of American children and set the groundwork for the United Kingdom to repossess the United States, and accused the "left-handed Irishman" Dever of being part of the plot. Thompson based these claims on McAndrew being critical of such artworks as Archibald Willard's The Spirit of '76 and allowing the use in schools of textbooks which Thompson alleged were unpatriotic and full of, "treason tainted histories". Thompson's attacks on McAndrew were a major factor in his successful mayoral campaign.

Thompson accused McAndrew of conspiring with the University of Chicago's Charles Hubbard Judd and Charles Edward Merriam to "destroy the love of America in the hearts of children by encouraging teachers to attend special classes at 'Chicago University' at which the text was used which pictured George Washington as a rebel and a great disloyalist."

Thompson was not a lone actor in publicly painting McAndrew as unpatriotic. In 1926, the "Citizens' Committee on School Histories", a group led by far-right ex-United States congressman John J. Gorman (and consisting largely of members of German and Irish descent), published a document that denounced three United States history textbooks that were in use in Chicago Public Schools as pro-British, and argued that heroes of other nationalities had been overlooked by the books in numerous instances. It also demanded that McAndrew remove from the school curriculum a list of books they alleged were "pro-British". While Mayor Dever brought this document to McAndrew's attention, McAndrew did not give it any concern. In 1927, Thompson would add the report published by this group to his campaign literature. Additionally, at the City Council's first meeting after McAndrew made a remark criticizing Archibald Willard's The Spirit of '76 for not being an accurate picture of war, Alderman John Coughlin denounced McAndrew's comments as being traitorous, and proposed an ordinance to denounce McAndrew. However, Alderman William D. Meyering, a decorated veteran of World War I, stood up and stated that he actually agreed with McAndrew's statement, which served to quash the momentum of Coughlin's ordinance.

Among the textbooks that Thompson criticized as unpatriotic were A History of the United States by Willian Fiske Gordy, Our United States by William Backus Guitteau, and The Silent Reader by Albert Lindsay Lewis and William D. Rowland. Former president of the Chicago Board of Education Charles Moderwell, who had served during the earlier part of Dever's mayoralty, argued that textbooks which Thompson attacked as being unpatriotic had actually been approved by the school board Thompson had appointed during his previous mayoralty. Indeed, the school's history textbooks had not been chosen by McAndrew but had rather been chosen by his predecessor. Thompson made the campaign promise of appointing, "a patriotic school board...who will rid the city of Superintendent McAndrew," and "his pro-English 'yes' men and women". He faulted Dever and Democratic political boss George E. Brennan as responsible for McAndrew's hiring.

Thompson also complained of there being a large number of pro-British books populating the city's libraries, and urged the residents to pillage the libraries and burn such books.

==== Possible motives ====
While it is not clear why Thompson chose to single-out McAndrew for such attacks, in a 1980 journal article, Dennis F. Thompson speculated that Thompson might have chosen McAndrew as an enemy, in part, due to McAndrew being a force against political patronage in schools, as well as due to McAndrew's ties to Dever. Another aspect that Dennis F. Thompson speculated may have been a factor was McAndrew's unpopularity with teachers. Dennis F. Thompson argued that there is strong evidence that teachers, indeed, very actively backed Thompson's candidacy in hopes of ousting McAndrew. Additionally, Thompson had, in the past, already appealed to the city's German and Irish populations by positioning himself as anti-British. A 1968 report by Robert J. Havighurst expressed the belief that Thompson was taking advantage of the situation created by McAndrew's combative relationship with teachers unions and the Chicago Federation of Labor. In addition, Thompson effectively made a liability for Dever what The New York Times considered to be his mayoralty's greatest success. The New York Times, on March 28, 1927, wrote,

No work of Mayor Dever's Administration has been more praiseworthy than the improvement and extension of the public school system, the seat of enormous mismanagement and inefficiency under Thompsonism."

The Chicago Tribune speculated that Thompson had removed McAndrew in order to clear the way for his political corruption to extend into the city's schools, writing in December 1929,

The superintendent was the one obstacle to the invasion of the school treasury by the Thompson machine. Furthermore, he was an impassable obstacle. So long as McAndrew remained in charge of the educational system the school funds would be administered properly. McAndrew must go or there would be no loot.

=== Developments in the initial months of Thompson's mayoralty ===
Having won the 1927 mayoral election, Thompson was sworn in as mayor on April 18, 1927. In his inaugural address, Thompson declared,

"I will proceed vigorously to oust Superintendent McAndrew from the schools of Chicago, and restore to the school children the true history of George Washington and the other fathers and heroes of our country, and expose the treason and propaganda which insidiously have been injected into our schools and other educational institutions."

At the time, McAndrew still had nine months left in his contract as superintendent. Thompson was impatient to get rid of McAndrew. On April 27, a private group with close connections to Thompson offered McAndrew $15,000 if he would resign as superintendent, but McAndrew refused to on principle.

On May 25, J. Lewis Coath was elected by the Chicago Board of Education as the board's new president. Coath was Thompson's personally-backed candidate for the job. Coath, as a board member, had spent months as a top foe to McAndrew. The board voted to select Coath by a 6–3 vote, with 3 of the votes in Coath's favor coming from board members that had originally been appointed by Dever (the three votes against his appointment also came from Dever appointees). However, the three Dever appointees who voted in support of electing Coath president of the board made it known that they would not back ousting McAndrew as superintendent. In July, Coath stated that the "bunk shooting educator" McAndrew was barely grasping onto his position and was promising that he would be ousted before the start of the new school year in September.

After becoming mayor, Thompson appointed former U.S. congressman John J. Gorman as a special assistant corporation counsel, with the assignment of looking through school textbooks for lies and distortions. Gorman, who was considered to have been an anglophobe, would reach the conclusion that books used by Chicago Public Schools were "poisoned" with British dogma, and that the British were taking over America, "not by shot and shell, but by a rain of propaganda."

On the Chicago Board of Education, member Otto L. Schmidt was made chairman of a committee to investigate the history textbooks taught in the city's schools.

== McAndrew's suspension by Chicago Board of Education ==
State law stated that McAndrew could only be dismissed by the Chicago Board of Education after an administrative hearing by the board, which would need to be held no less than thirty days after charges would be brought against him. By August, reshaped by appointments Thompson had made to it, the Chicago Board of Education was moving under Thompson's influence. Thompson had been able to gain control so quickly due to the resignations of a number of board members, as well as threats made to remaining members. A majority vote against McAndrew had been assured in August by the switch of Dever appointee Theophilus Schmid to an anti-McAndrew position.

Since 1909, the Chicago Public Schools' school clerks had simply been certified teachers who were assigned clerical duties. However, in April 1927, the Board of Education's attorney, at the urging of a Thompson-allied board member, rendered an opinion that the school clerks must be selected by the City Civil Service Commission, pointing to an opinion that the Illinois Appellate Courts had rendered in March 1927, which found that the schools' janitors and engineers needed to be selected by that commission. On August 3, 1927, the Chicago Board of Education adopted a resolution that would dismiss all 350 of the school system's school clerks, and have them be replaced with Civil Service Commission appointees. McAndrew was outraged by this, seeing it as an attempt by Thompson to return patronage to the education system, and resisted this order. McAndrew assisted the school clerks in preparing to file an injunction against their dismissal. He appeared as a witness to argue for the injunction, testifying that an injunction against the Board should be granted and that the school board attorney had signed his name to papers without his knowledge.

At the August 26, 1927 conference of the Chicago Board of Education members, President J. Lewis Coath declared it was time to oust McAndrew, saying, "you all know my position concerning Superintendent McAndrew. Recent developments have made it advisable to take action at once. Get started." That same day, McAndrew was also attacked by a Dever appointee on the Board, Charles J. Vopicka, for rejecting Vopicka's foreign language education plan, indicating McAndrew to be in even weaker standing than before with the Chicago Board of Education. The following day, the Chicago Tribune reported that McAndrew's only apparent remaining supporters on the board were Helen M. Hefferan, James Mullenbach, Walter J. Raymer, and Otto L. Schmidt.

On August 29, 1927, James Todd, the attorney of the Chicago Board of Education, presented charges against McAndrew of insubordination (due to his support of the school clerks) and "conduct incompatible and inconsistent with, and in direct violation" of his duties. Todd had been directed by the board's president, J. Lewis Coath to prepare such charges against McAndrew. That same day, by a 6–5 vote, the board voted to suspend McAndrew and charge him with insubordination pending a public administrative hearing to be held before the board for the purposes of deciding whether to remove McAndrew from office. They installed William J. Bogan as acting superintendent to carry out the duties of the superintendency during McAndrew's suspension.

McAndrew refused to resign, by which means he could have avoided an administrative hearing. He declared, "They'll fire me alright, but they'll have to stage a burlesque show to do it." On September 29, 1927, the day the administrative hearing was set to begin, the school board added additional charges that McAndrew had contaminated the school curriculum with British propaganda. McAndrew's lawyers protested these charges, and requested thirty days to study them before the administrative hearing. This request was denied by Chicago Board of Education president J. Lewis Coath, and the administrative hearing began that day as scheduled. He was read sixteen charges of insubordination, including a charge stemming from allegations of unpatriotic actions at his arraignment, and pleaded not guilty to any acts which would be grounds for his removal.

This was not the first time that Thompson or a school board composed of his appointees had conspired to oust a superintendent. An ouster of Charles Ernest Chadsey had occurred during Thompson's first mayoralty, which would result in several school board members being charged in Cook County Circuit Court of conspiracy.

=== Details of the formal motion to suspend McAndrew ===
The formal motion to suspend McAndrew had originated with Board of Education Trustee James A. Hemingway, whose resolution read,

I, James A. Hemingway, a citizen of the city of Chicago and a member of the board of education, hereby prefer against William McAndrew, superintendent of schools, charges of insubordination and conduct incompatible with and inconsistent with, and in direct violation of, his duties as superintendent of schools, an executive officer of the board of education of the city of Chicago."

This was followed by a list of charges related to McAndrew's testimony as a witness for the teachers. The principal clause read,

The said William McAndrew, in total disregard of the directions and instructions imposed upon him by the board of education, has omitted, failed, neglected, and refused to comply with the provision of the resolution (ordering teacher-clerks placed under the civil service) and herinbefore set forth, directing him to forthwith arrange for the transfer to instructional work of all members of the teaching force who had been assigned to any other line of work, and further directing the superintendent of schools to forthwith make requisition for the certification by the civil service commission of such employees as might be necessary to carry on all clerical and business administrative activities of the educational department.

The motion did not include any mention of the allegations of pro-British propaganda. This came after James Todd threatened to drop his charges, "if any of that bunk is brought up."

==== Vote ====
The Chicago Board of Education voted 6–5 to pass the resolution suspending McAndrew.

Vote on suspension of Superintendent McAndrew pending an administrative hearing
Board of Education member	Appointed to board by	Vote
Walter H. Brandenburg	William Hale Thompson	Yea
J. Lewis Coath	William Hale Thompson	Yea
Oscar Durante	William Hale Thompson	Yea
John A. English	William Emmet Dever	Yea
Helen Hefferan	William Emmet Dever	Nay
James A. Hemingway	William Hale Thompson	Yea
James Mullenbach	William Emmet Dever	Nay
Walter J. Raymer	William Emmet Dever	Nay
Theophilus Schmid	William Emmet Dever	Yea
Otto L. Schmidt	William Emmet Dever	Nay
Charles J. Vopicka	William Emmett Dever	Nay

== Sixteen counts of indictment ==
The sixteen counts of indictment that were leveled against McAndrew were:

1. That William McAndrew recommended history textbooks which contained pro-British propaganda and which omitted the names and exploits of many foreign and native born heroes of the American revolutionary war, and which were recommended by the said William McAndrew for the purpose of promoting propaganda for the English Speaking union. That said textbooks teach the continental congress was a collection of quarrelsome, petty-fogging lawyers and mechanics.
2. That the said William McAndrew caused the text books to be recommended for the purpose of causing the Declaration of Independence to be regarded as old fashioned.
3. That he, for the purpose of perverting and distorting the ideals and patriotic instincts of the school children of Chicago, caused to be removed from the walls of the schools the picture "The Spirit of '76".
4. That he refused to recommend to the board that the school children be permitted to donate small amounts of money for the purpose of reconditioning the famous American battleship, "Old Ironsides"
5. That he entered into a conspiracy with Charles E. Merriam, Charles H. Judd (professor of history at the University of Chicago) and others to destroy love of America in the hearts of children by encouraging teachers to attend special classes at the University of Chicago at which a textbook was used which pictured George Washington as a rebel and a great disloyalist. That said teachers would mold these pro-British ideals into the souls of the children they instructed.
6. That he was insubordinate, insolent, and domineering in his attitude toward the members of the board, particularly in that he disregarded the board's orders regarding the nomination of a member to the board of examiners.
7. That he refused to call meetings of the teachers' councils.
8. That he hindered the withdrawal of a text book written by a member of the Chicago school system, and used in violation of law in Chicago schools.
9. That he delayed the transfer of Genevieve Cook, a teacher.
10. That he repeatedly absented himself from duty without leave.
11. That he left his office frequently to go on lecture tours, for which he was paid $100 a day and expenses.
12. That he acted as editor of educational publications which are subsidized by a certain firm of school book publishers, and thereby deeply obligated himself to publishers interested in getting their textbooks approved for school use.
13. That he introduced a program of education which caused confusion and impaired morale of teachers.
14. That he rejected all plans which were not his own invention.
15. That he employed various people without first subjecting them to examinations.
16. That he frequently refused to comply with exact and implicit orders of the Chicago Board of Education.

== Hearing details ==
The hearing effectively amounted to a show trial. 27 sessions of the hearing were held over the course of months. In mid-December, during the fourteenth week of the hearing, the Chicago Board of Education moved to allow nighttime sessions of the hearing to be held.

McAndrew's attorneys were Francis X. Busch (former Chicago corporation counsel) and Angus Roy Shannon (former attorney for the Chicago Board of Education). Frank S. Righeimer served as the Chicago Board of Education's representative in the hearing.

== Opening of the hearing ==
In every roll call vote held by the board on the opening day of the administrative hearing, at least six members (Barndenburg, Coath, Durante, English, Schmid, and Hemingway) voted against every action favored by McAndrew and his attorneys. Four, (Hefferan, Mullenbach, Raymer, and Schmidt) voted in support of McAndrew's side on these votes. A seventh (Vopicka) rotated between sides. McAndrew's team pushed for an expedient hearing process, with daily sessions, but were denied this, with the next sessions being postponed until October 6, 1927. McAndrew's lawyers argued that Coath's past statements were prejudicial, and made him unfit to preside or be a party to the hearing. Additionally, they argued that Coath was acting as a tool of Mayor Thompson and in unlawful confederacy with the mayor regarding his actions against McAndrew. However, the board members voted Coath fit to preside. Similarly, McAndrew's lawyers argued that Board of Education trustee Hemingway was unfit to try the charges, as he had been the one to present them. The board also voted him fit to try the charges. On the opening day, McAndrew opted not to speak once. Even when asked to how he pled, McAndrew remained silent, having his lawyers plead "not guilty" on his behalf.

== McAndrew's attendance/absence ==
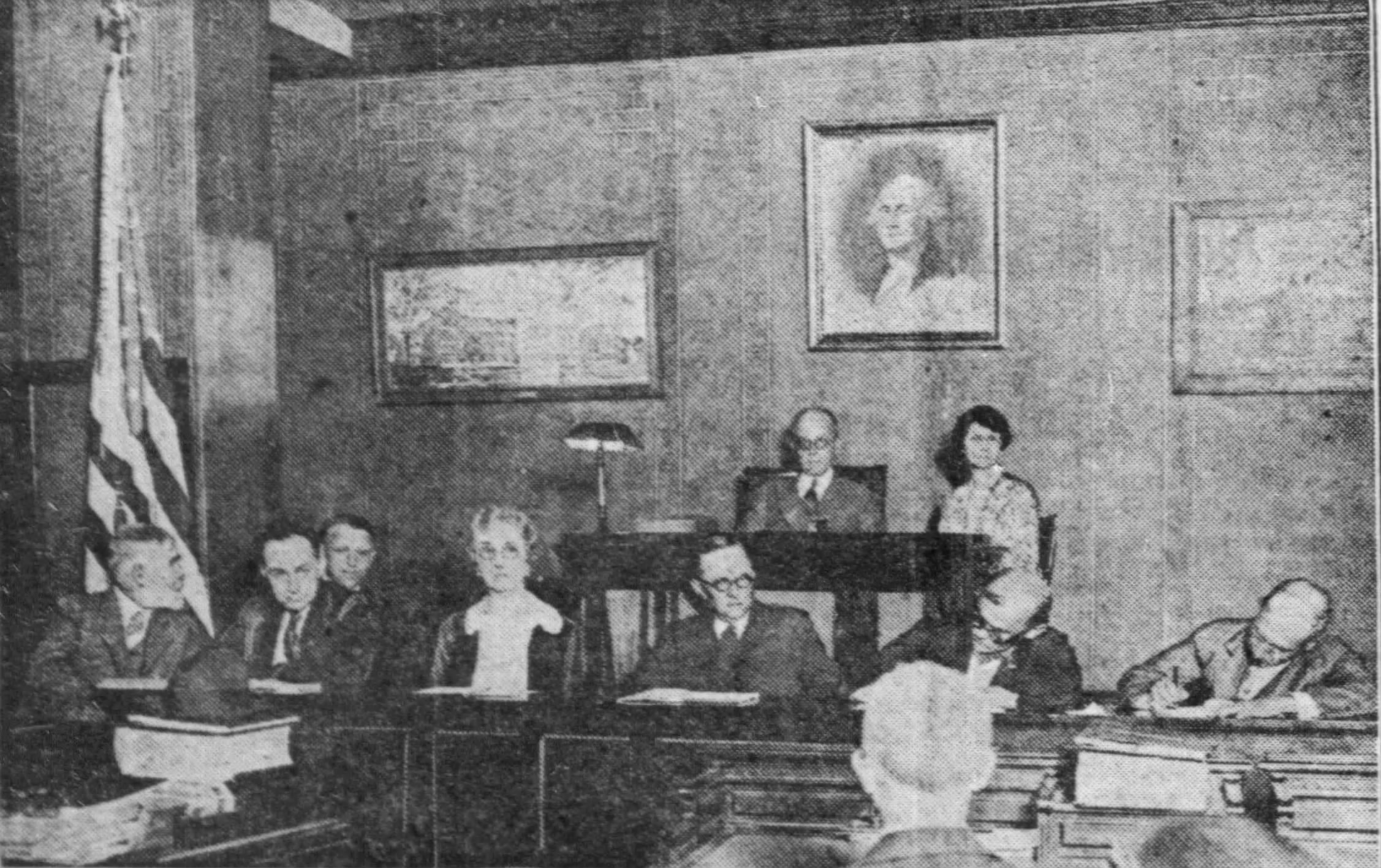
McAndrew (pictured at far-left) testifying at a session of the administrative hearing held in early October 1927. Chicago Board of Education President J. Lewis Coath is seated atop the hearing room dais

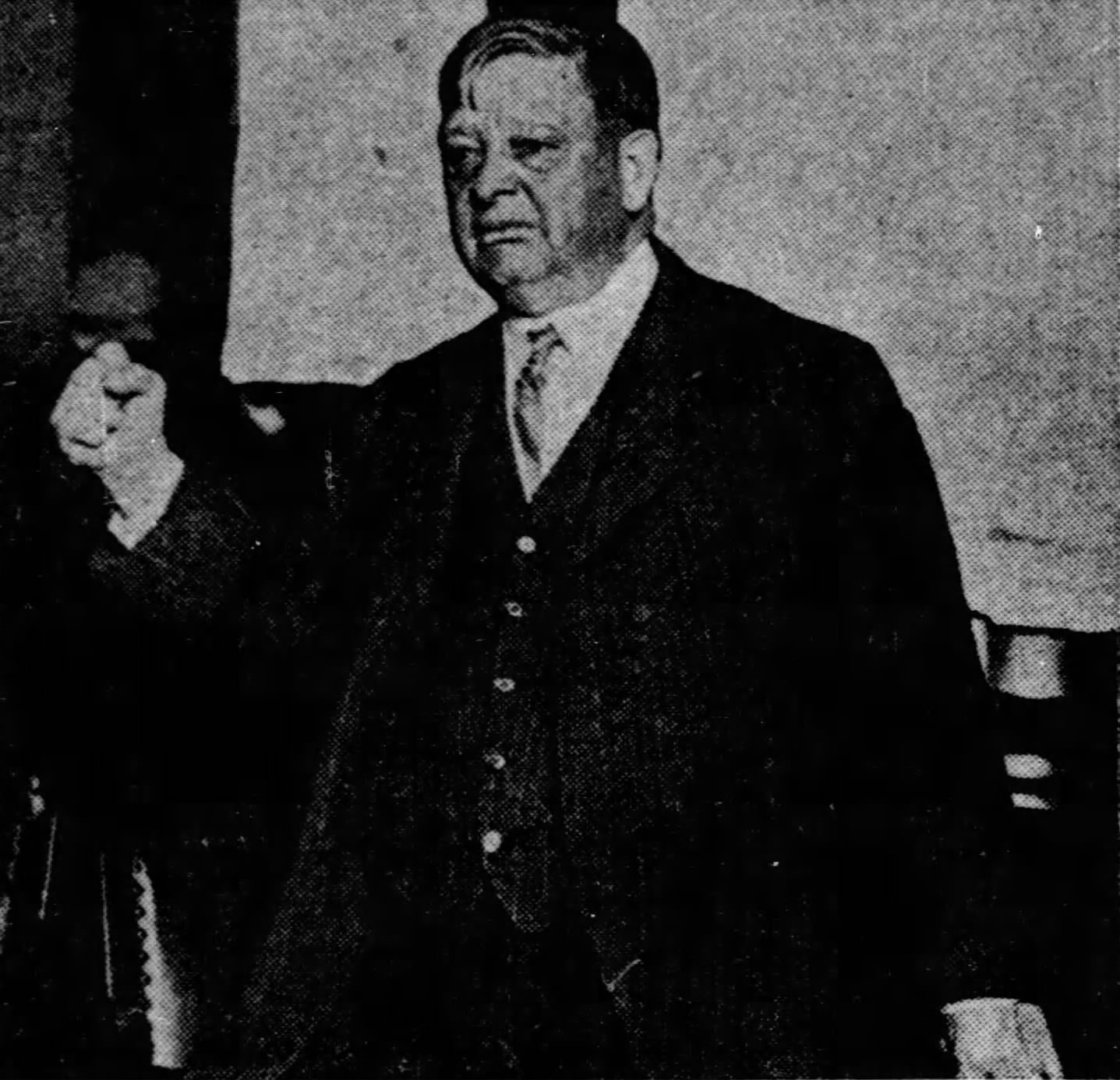
Chicago Board of Education Trustee Walter J. Raymer delivering remarks assailing McAndrew's opponents during a November 1927 session of the administrative hearing

During the first weeks of proceedings, McAndrew sat, often reading a newspaper. On October 24, 1927, a hearing was canceled when McAndrew failed to show. Before the proceedings were canceled, Chicago Board of Education attorney Righeimer asked "what is the superintendent doing that is more important than this trial", to which McAndrew's attorney Shannon retorted, "anything is more important than this trial". It would be revealed the following day that McAndrew had been out of the city for a speaking engagement. On November 23, 1927, after six weeks, a fed-up McAndrew stood and asked whether the board would actually address the specific charge they had brought against him. Receiving no answer, he left, declaring that he would return if the Board desired to dismiss the charges. He issued the ultimatum that he would not return until the board took up the specific charges made against him. The administrative hearing would go on with McAndrew in absentia. McAndrew's lawyers joined him in refusing to attend the remainder of the hearing.

During the final hearing date he attended (November 23, 1927), McAndrew attempted to have the Board read a statement he had written. The statement, in part, read,

It is now seven months since the new mayor in his official inaugural address declared his intention, though he has no proper jurisdiction over the schools, to proceed to oust the superintendent...It is now nearly five months since your president and five members voted to charge me with insubordination and improper conduct in having entered into an unlawful confederacy with certain employees of the board, designated as extra teachers....Instead of trying me on the alleged misdemeanor for which I was suspended, you have permitted to be added a host of irrelevant allegations....The repeated published assertion of your president that he will put the superintendent out, the degradation of your school system in the eyes of the entire country by editorial condemnation of the trial as a farce and vaudeville; the cloud of aspersion you permit to remain upon you best teachers that they recommended to the superintendent the adoption of poisoned books; the effect on your school children of the continued characterization of your proceedings as a travesty on justice; the repeated and uncontradicted editorial designation of his trial as before a packed jury and an admittedly prejudicial judge, all lead me to desire to escape being a party to the continuance of what is almost universally regarded as a burlesque.

== Arguments ==
=== Allegations of British propaganda ===
Much of the hearing's testimony was centered on the allegations that McAndrew placed British propaganda in the city's schools. Witnesses alleged that British propagandists had effectively taken over the Chicago educational system under McAndrew. Witnesses criticized the use of texts, including texts written by Arthur M. Schlesinger Sr. Among the witnesses that testified in the administrative hearing were three pseudo-historians, who each went on long rants attacking history textbooks in use in Chicago schools. The textbooks attacked by these three witnesses, however, were standard fare, and were widely utilized in schools across the United States. At the November 16, 1927 hearing session, McAndrew refused to provide an answer when Righeimer asked him to confirm or deny whether he or not he had recommended a textbook by Edward F. McLaughlin which had been characterized during the hearing as portraying a British viewpoint on the American Revolution.

On one occasion, Helen Hefferan, a Chicago Board of Trustee supporting McAndrew, held up a 1921 newspaper during the hearing which featured an article alleging a conspiracy to litter textbooks with British propaganda. This was an effort by her to highlight that such charges were made in 1921, while Thompson was serving in his first tenure as mayor, and that Thompson took no action nor complained about this until much later. Hefferan was scolded by Coath, accused her of acting in "very bad taste" and making "prejudicial statements".

During the early weeks of the administrative hearing, which McAndrew and his lawyers attended, the board read a letter written to them by Thompson, naming a number of Polish, German, and other ethnic "heroes" that he demanded to be taught in the city's schools. A moment which drew national attention during the administrative hearing saw Righeimer yell at McAndrew, "and you left out of the schools the name of that great hero, Ethan Allen, who said he had only one life to give for his country!" In response to this, Busch remarked, "It was Nathan Hale who said it." This exchange elicited laughter in the courtroom and ridicule, not only due to Righeimer's misattribution of a quote associated with Hale to Allen, but also because many were unfamiliar with Allen, and did not see him as the high-stature historical figure Righeimer was implying him to be.

McAndrew was accused, in his indictment and during the course of the administrative hearing, of nefariously conspiring with the English-Speaking Union. McAndrew was a member of the English-Speaking Union. During the trial, the American Library Association, which had been headed by a Canadian, was alleged to be a distributor of British propaganda. The Chicago Public Library's association with the Association became of issue in the administrative hearing. Also of issue was that Great Britain had once donated books to Chicago in the aftermath of the 1871 Great Chicago Fire. Allegations were levied by Thompson allies that McAndrew was conspiring with Charles Edward Merriam and others at the University of Chicago (decried as a "stronghold of King George") to, "destroy love of America in the hearts of children". During the administrative hearing, it was revealed that Thompson had, during his campaign, hired a court reporter to pose student and spy on a University of Chicago professor who was teaching a history class that had been recommended for public school teachers. This spy reported that the professor had called George Washington a "rebel" and referred to the Boston Tea Party as a "vandal raid". Allegations were also levied that Cecil Rhodes, who had founded the Rhodes Scholarship program, was conspiring to unite all English-speaking people under the control of Britain. Some witnesses even speculated of an impending war between Britain and the United States. Other organizations invoked and attacked in the course of the administrative hearing included Columbia University and the Carnegie Corporation. Figures from fictitious organizations such as the "Anti-British Citizens Committee on School Histories" were brought in to testify in the administrative hearing.

=== Allegations of unpatriotic conduct by McAndrew ===
From the start of the administrative hearing, witnesses were brought before the board to testify about McAndrew, regularly testifying of his supposed "un-Americanism". Among the allegations made wasthat McAndrew had made derisive comments about the Boston Tea Party and that he ordered the removal of prints of The Spirit of '76 from schools.

McAndrew was painted as anti-American for disallowing fundraising in the city's schools for the restoration of the USS Constitution. In May 1926, McAndrew had denied a request by the United States Navy to allow them to fundraise for the restoration of the USS Constitution by soliciting contributions from students in the schools. At the time, the editorial board of the Chicago Tribune praised McAndrew for this decision on the grounds that they believed that financial solicitations of any kind had no place in the city's public schools.

=== Allegations of misconduct by McAndrew ===
When questioned under oath by Righeimer on October 6, 1927, McAndrew admitted to having removed some documents from the Chicago Board of Education's files in order to prepare his defense. Coath another other McAndrew foes claimed that his removal of documents was an outright indicator of guilt. Harry T. Baker, an executive assistant to the office of the superintendent of schools, admitted in his testimony to giving some files to McAndrew. The following day Baker would see retribution from the Chicago Board of Education by being installed principal of the city's southernmost school, Mount Greenwood –which was considered an undesirable job. It became known that anyone seen as giving McAndrew aid or comfort could see retribution from Coath.

During the early weeks of the hearing, McAndrew's critics criticized his regular refusal to answer questions on advice of his counsel greatly improper. His critics alleged that this was an act of defying superior officers (the trustees of the Chicago Board of Education) since he was still the superintendent of schools. Righeimer warned, "this trial board has no right to punish you for contempt, Mr. McAndrew, but it certainly will consider your conduct in refusing to give important information when the time comes to pass on your case.

Witnesses corroborated the charges that McAndrew made out of town trips to deliver lectures. They also testified that, while he was on these trips, McAndrew had instructed office employees to mislead those attempted to reach him by telephone by claiming the reason he was not in the office was that he was, "out in the schools". Two stenographers testified that McAndrew had had them perform work on during office hours for a magazine he was editing. McAndrew also was accused of fraud, with several principals alleging that he had disregarded the results of examinations for high positions, and instead appointed those he personally favored.

Even mundane attacks were leveled against McAndrew. One teacher spent time testifying that McAndrew had poor grammar and occasionally punctuated sentences with the informal exclamations such as "I betcha" and "O, Lord".

== Witness testimonies ==
In total, over the course of the 27 sessions of the hearing, more than 100 witnesses testified. This amounted to more than 6,000 pages of testimony. Those who testified included more than 80 principals, teachers, and school officials. Many of the witnesses were recruited by Thompson to strengthen his charges of propaganda. Much of the testimony was centered on the allegations that McAndrew placed British propaganda in the city's schools. From the start of the administrative hearing, witnesses were brought before the board to testify about McAndrew, regularly testifying of his supposed "un-Americanism". They also alleged that British propagandists had effectively taken over the Chicago educational system under McAndrew.

=== John J. Gorman ===
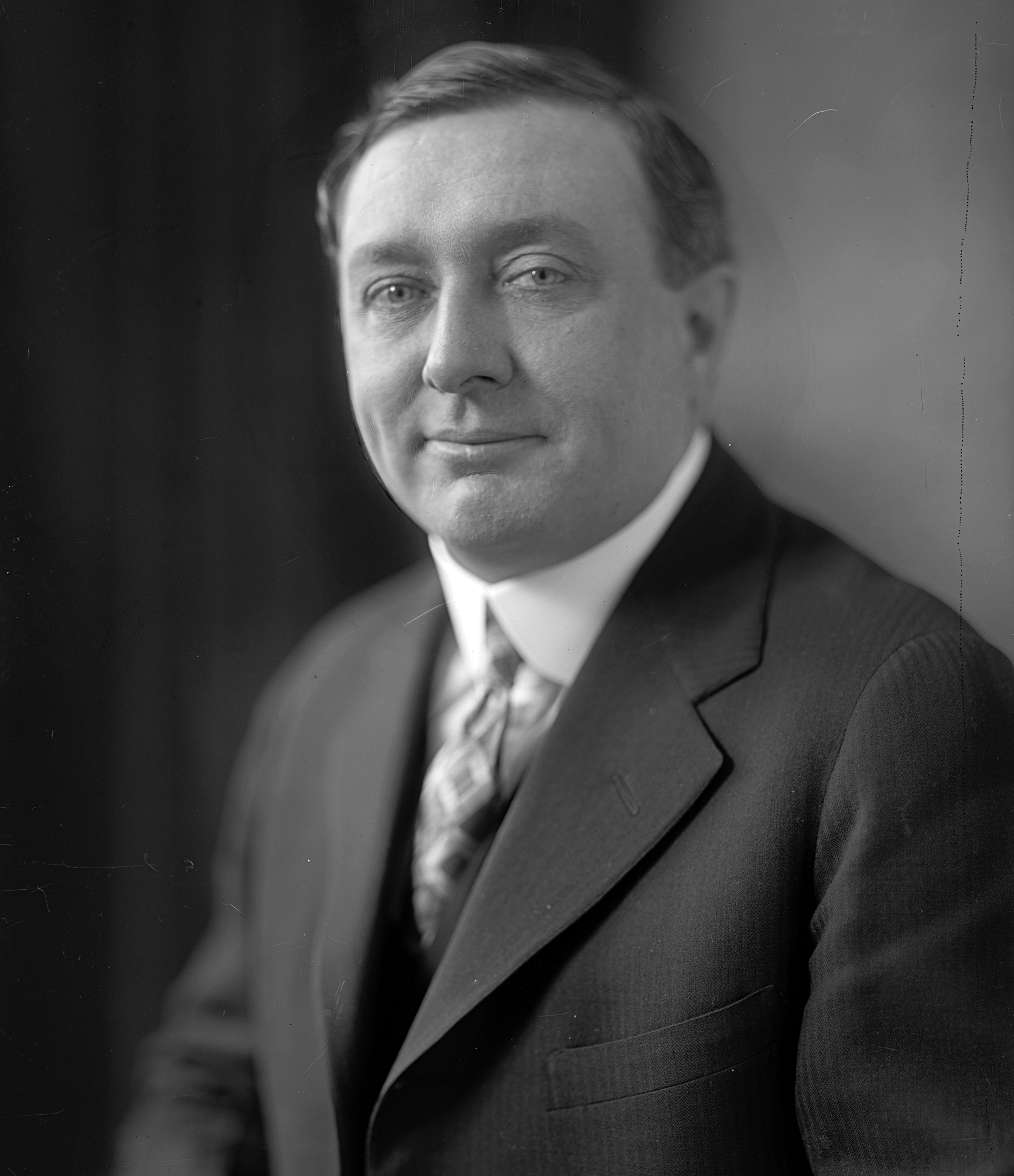
John J. Gorman

Thompson-appointed special corporation counsel and ex-congressman John J. Gorman testified over the course of the administrative hearing as one of its chief witnesses against McAndrew. Members of the Chicago Board of Education that supported McAndrew questioned Gorman's credentials as "an expert". The New York Times described Gorman as effectively playing the role of a prosecutor in his testimony. Gorman would later, in 1931, be disbarred for perjury made in his testimony.

As a witness accusing McAndrew of placing British propaganda in the school curriculum, John J. Gorman attacked McAndrew for the use of books written by Herbert B. Cornish, David B. Corson, David Saville Muzzey, and Arthur M. Schlesinger Sr., and William H. Mace. Gorman specifically issued criticisms of Muzzey's book American History and Schesinger's New Viewpoints of American History. Gorman alleged that all but one history textbook used in Chicago Public Schools were pro-British, and alleged that McAndrew had directly approved all of these textbooks.

Gorman also alleged that the English-Speaking Union had played a role in McAndrew's appointment as superintendent in Chicago, and his earlier placement in a leadership position in New York City Public Schools. Gorman also accused the University of Chicago of being a "hotbed of un-American and pro-British teachings". Two weeks later, he further testified that the university was a "British cast" and a stronghold for pro-British propaganda. Gorman also alleged that McAndrew had been conspiring with King George since his previous tenure working in New York City Public Schools. He named the Rhodes Scholarship program and the Carnegie Foundation as programs which were in on the conspiracy. He even attempted to draw a supposed link from the fact that King George, the late Andrew Carnegie, and McAndrew all had facial hair.

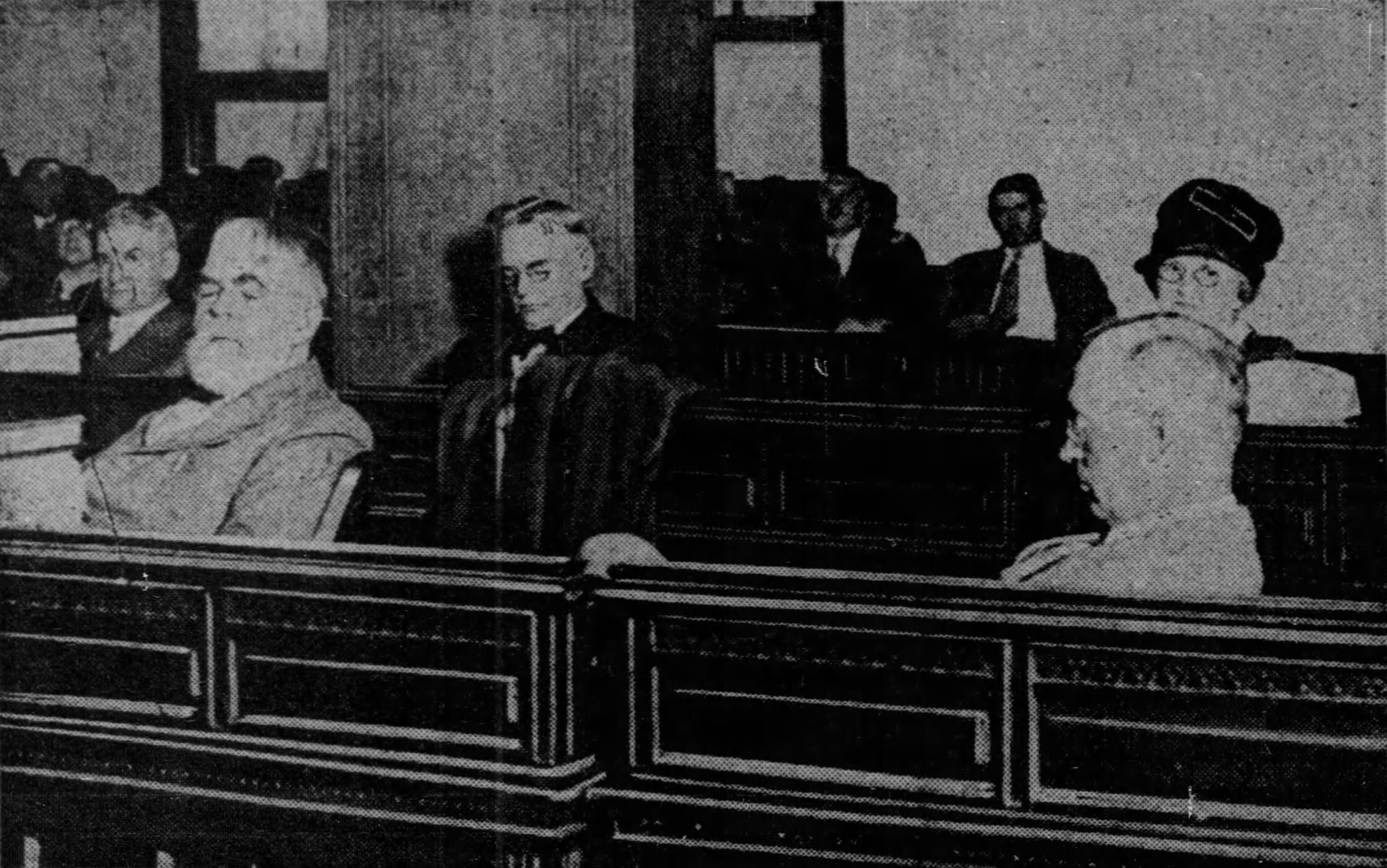
Photograph of the hearing room during Gorman's testimony in mid-October. Several individuals were noted by the Chicago Tribune to demonstrate sleepiness in this photograph, which the Tribune attributed to the long-windedness of Gorman's testimony. Photographed are (from left to right) John A. English (vice president of the Chicago Board of Education); William McAndrew, Otto Schmidt (member of the Chicago Board of Education), Angus Roy Shannon (attorney for McAndrew), and Helen Heffernan (member of the Chicago Board of Education)

In October 1927, Muzzey filed a lawsuit against Gorman over his claims about his books. On October 25, 1927, Schlesinger and Mace both issued public responses to Gorman's accusations against their texts.

=== Frederick Bausman ===
On October 20, 1927, Frederick Bausman, a former justice of the Supreme Court of Pennsylvania, testified as the chief witness. In his testimony, Bausman did not once mention McAndrew's name. Bausman also declared, "I know nothing of your local school books." Not only did he not mention of McAndrew, but he also did not mention Chicago schools outside of praising the stance taken by Mayor Thompson. Instead of focusing on McAndrew and Chicago schools, Bausman's testimony instead focused on alleging British propaganda was of great threat to the United States in general. He accused the American Library Association of being an agent of propaganda, alleging that its Canadian president George Locke had been the director of propaganda for the British Government during World War I. Bauman also attacked the English-Speaking Union. Bausman stated that, "wealthy classes in Europe have tremendous influence at Columbia and Princeton universities," implying that wealthy Europeans had led an effort that saw pro-British textbooks written at these American universities.

Bausman attacked the United Kingdom for having "beguiled" the United States into entering World War I. Rigeimer, in examining Bausman, had him state that he was born in Pittsburgh and had a British mother in an effort to assuage any allegations that Bausman was a German sympathizer.

=== Charles Grant Miller ===
Charles Grant Miller, the president of the Patriotic League of the Preservation of American History, was the sole witness at the November 14, 1927 hearing date. Miller substantiated John J. Gorman's allegations that British propaganda had infiltrated the city's history curriculum.

On November 14, Miller also made allegations that the framing histories related to the relations of Great Britain and the United States were heavily altered between 1918 and 1921, when new an updated textbooks were published to include World War I. Miller claimed that, in 1921, historians such as Andrew C. McLaughlin (head of the University of Chicago's American history department), Carlton J. H. Hayes (of Columbia University), David S. Muzzey, and Willis M. West dined together at the Savoy Hotel in London, England, claiming that they and 100 other history authors had been, "wined and dined at the expense of the British Government in such a degree of gratitude as to provoke protest in Parliament at the extravagance."

In his November 30, 1927 testimony, Miller made Rupert Hughes a new focus of attack.

=== Charles Edward Russell ===
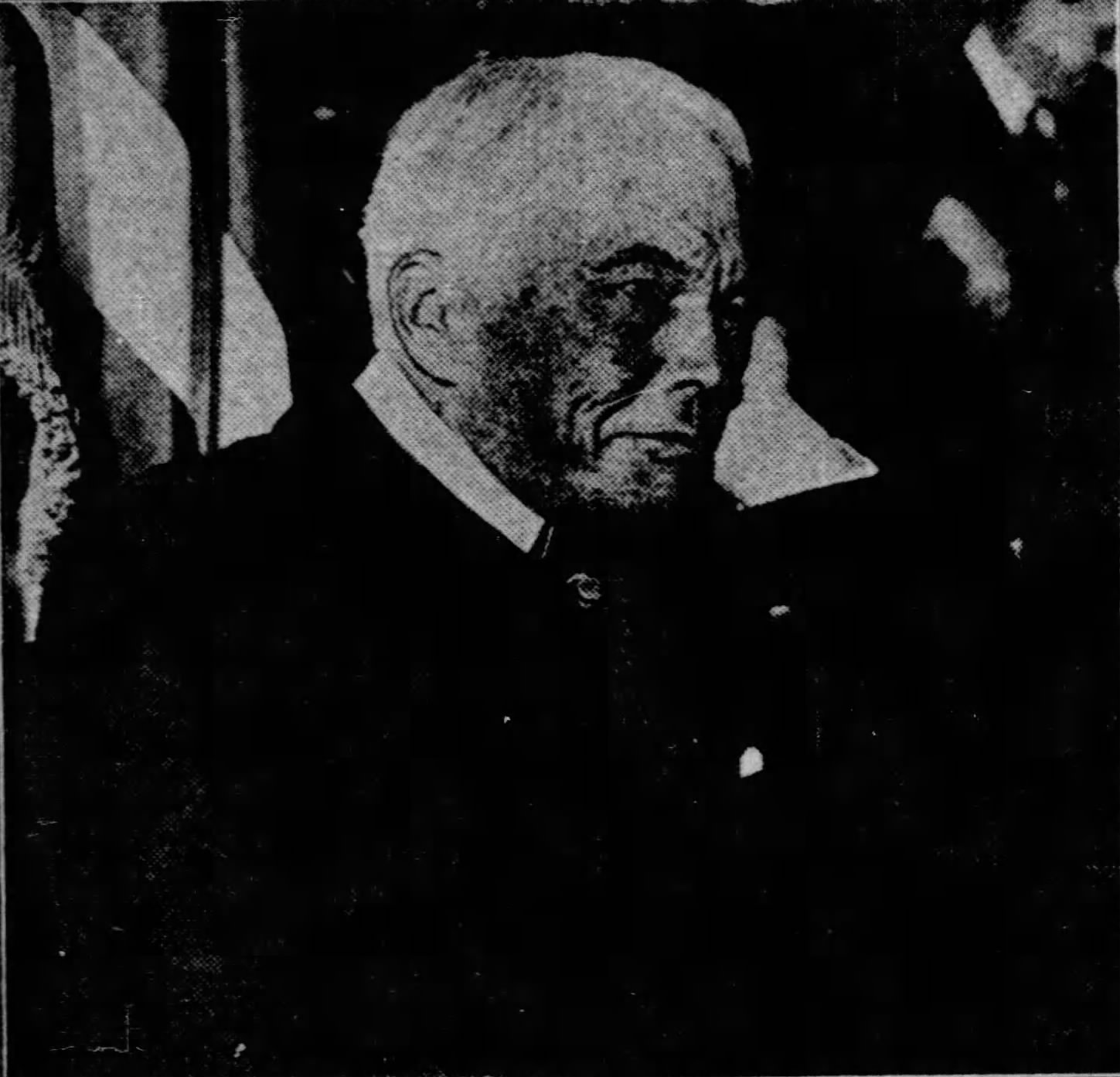
Charles Edward Russell delivering his testimony on November 16, 1927

On November 16, 1927, journalist Charles Edward Russell delivered testimony which the Chicago Tribune characterized as effectively being as a three-hour lecture. In his testimony, Russell alleged that the English-Speaking Union was the "most dangerous organization in the world", claiming, "the world is threatened now with the greatest menace–the advance of the Anglo-Saxon". Russell declared that the push for a closer alliance between the United States and United Kingdom, "is drawing the world into two hostile camps, the Anglo-Saxon and the Latin. By foolishly listening we have already alienated nearly all of South America". In his testimony that day, Russell, at great length, also attacked numerous history texts.

== Media coverage ==
The administrative hearing attracted both national and international attention from the media, being treated as a ridiculous example of Chicago's messy politics. It was viewed by many as a ridiculous spectacle, in a similar vein to the Scopes Trial. Time characterized the Chicago Board of Education as, "a partial set of false teeth in Mayor William Hale Thompson's capable mouth", writing that they had, "orders to chew up Superintendent McAndrew". W.A.S. Douglas of The Baltimore Sun dubbed the administrative hearing, "Chicago's great serial comedy-drama". The press referred to Mayor Thompson in derisive terms, dubbing him a "clown", "buffoon", and a "braying jackass".

In a January 1928 article, the Chicago Tribune wrote that the administrative hearing was setting precedents in Chicago, "that no superintendent of schools may, with security, get in the way of politics. If he obstruct a politician's path he will be in trouble," and, "that no superintendent who cares for his peace and his tenure of office will put his ideas of teaching and school management in opposition to the ideas of the principals and teachers." The Chicago Tribune found both of these to be, "to the detriment of the schools".

In December 1929, the Chicago Tribune reflected on the administrative hearing, writing,

A trial was conceived and conducted under a buffoon judge, J. Lewis Coath. The result was never in doubt. The disreputable members of the board had pledged their votes against McAndrew, so that the school should be restored to the Thompson feed box. Two honorable members voted for McAndrew, while eight voted at Thompson's behest. Immediately after the expulsion of the distinguished superintendent the great raid upon the schools was started. Appointments to the educational and administrative departments were dictated by Thompson's precinct captains. Capable and experienced members of the school system were dismissed to make room for wretched election huslers......Now the school system is bankrupt. With McAndrew out of the way they took everything in sight and are now confessing helplessness to carry on the education of the children.

== Public reaction ==
During the administrative hearing, McAndrew lacked the support of the unionized teachers, as they did not approve of the strict rules that he, as superintendent, had put in place for teachers.

The Women's City Club supported McAndrew, having adopted a resolution demanding his reinstatement as superintendent. On October 27, they adopted another resolution which demanded that McAndrew be provided an immediate trial of the specific charge for which he was suspended.

A speech written by McAndrew and read in his absence at a November 1927 state convention of school board officials received significant applause, reflecting the convention's support of McAndrew.

Thompson's broader anti-British crusade was met with both rebuke and praise. At a meeting of the Chicago union ministers, Reverend Robert Clements called for a protest to be organized, "against the action of various political agencies in Chicago who are trying to blind the public by their insidious action which is more than an insult to the beast thinking element in this country." This marked prominent opposition to Thompson's anti-British crusade. On November 1, 1927, when Thompson appeared before a meeting of the American Association for the Recognition of the Irish Republic held in Toledo, Ohio, the organization passed a resolution denouncing "all individuals and agencies who are endeavoring to hinder Mayor Thompson in his patriot efforts" as unpatriotic to America. The resolution alleged that many of the opponents of Thompson's anti-British crusade as being "recipients of British favors, which causes them to feel obliged to denounce their own nation and send to the level of the lowest worm of humanity."

== Coinciding developments ==
During the administrative hearing, Chicago City Solicitor Frank Peska wrote Chicago Board of Education member Walter J. Raymer a letter demanding that he resign due to his defense of McAndrew. Peska declared that Raymer did not represent the attitude of the Polish residents living in Peska's ward of the city.

In response to John J. Gorman's written report to the mayor and his testimony during the administrative hearing about textbooks authored by David Saville Muzzey, Muzzey filed a $100,000 damage/libel lawsuit against Gorman in United States District Court in October 1927, accusing Gorman of "widedly and maliciously" making an effort to expose him to public hatred, contempt, and disparagement in his testimony.

In reaction to the allegations brought against the University of Chicago in the administrative hearing, on November 11, 1927, J. Lewis Coath banned articles written by University of Chicago faculty from being published in the Chicago Board of Education's publication, Chicago Schools Journal, and the following month's edition of the publication would feature a title page promoting an "America First" campaign.

Thompson pledged to take his campaign against "British propaganda" nationwide, declaring at a November 1, 1927 speech in Toledo, Ohio, "we are going to straighten out the affairs of the schools in Chicago,, and we are going to make our campaign nationwide." Thompson called for the election of "America First" delegates to both the 1928 Republican National Convention and the 1928 Democratic National Convention, warning that he believed Wall Street and international banking interests were working to influence the composition both party's delegates. Thompson also sought to form a nationwide "America First" organization that would promote a "nationwide educational campaign to teach the constitution of the United States of America and respects for our form of government." Thompson distributed membership invitations to prominent figures across the country, including governors, senators, congressmen, and mayors. Among those who responded with interest in joining was Cornelius Vanderbilt Jr.

In November, 1927, officials of the Chicago Board of Education announced that the purchase of history textbooks for students was being halted until it could be ensured that books of proper patriotism could be purchased. Soon after, Coath proposed the possibility of the Chicago Board of Education publishing its own history books.

In December 1927, exporter John F. McKeon alleged that the anti-British campaign of Thompson had lost manufacturers and exporters in the city of Chicago $1.5 million in business from Australia.

=== Chicago Public Library censorship effort ===
On October 21, 1927, the day after Frederick Bausman's testimony included attacks on the American Library Association, Thompson made a request to the board of the Chicago Public Library's board that they take a look at U.S. history books in the library, writing, "I would like to have you make a careful inventory of Chicago's Public Library to determine if there are pro-British propaganda books in the library." While the library board attempted to discreetly refer the matter to a subcommittee, the city press learned of it. Thompson, who enjoyed publicity, seized on the news reports, and promised reporters he would burn books that were "unamerican". Thompson tasked Urbine J. "Sport" Herrmann (a close friend of Thompson's and appointee of his to the board of the Chicago Public Library) with examining the library's books for "pro-British" works. During the administrative hearing, Hermann announced that he would conduct a book burning of pro-British books on the city's lakefront. Thompson joined in, threatening to burn any book in the library found to have a single passage of "pro-British propaganda" in a lakefront bonfire. These plans were faced with two injunctions.

The threat of book burning had received criticism from notable individuals, such as Clarence Darrow, who called it, "probably the most infinitely stupid thing ever suggested". A public backlash arose to the idea of book burning and general censorship. On October 25, Chicago Alderman Donald S. McKinley announced his intention to raise his objections to book burning and Thompson's investigation into the city's libraries at the next Chicago City Council meeting. However, some supported the prospect of book burning. The state chapter of the Ku Klux Klan applauded the book censorship efforts of Thompson, and encouraged him to expand this to a full effort against books related to Catholics and Jews. The state Klan chose to adopt Thompson's "America First" slogan and announced its plans to distribute millions of pamphlets across Chicago on school-related policies. The grand dragon of the Knights of the Ku Klux Klan of Illinois remarked, "the Klan and Mayor Thompson are absolutely agreed on the 'America First' proposition. We feel that the direction of the public schools should be entrusted to no man who will be affected by racial or religious influence."

Fredrick Rex, the head of the city's Municipal Reference Library, agreed to clear his collection of "pro-British" books, and claimed that his library had previously been the recipient of such propaganda from both the English-Speaking Union and the Carnegie Corporation and that he would hand over such works to Herrmann immediately. Days later, Rex claimed that he had destroyed all the books, pamphlets, and letters in the library's collection that were of a pro-British nature.

In an effort to prevent the burning of books, Chicago's head librarian Carl B. Roden (who had recently been elected president of the American Library Association) made the suggestion of the books labeled "pro-British" being placed in a cage, only to be read under the supervision of "mature" historians. Roden's proposed compromise was endorsed by a pro-Thompson newspaper, but was mocked and decried by other newspapers, such as the Chicago Tribune and the Chicago Evening Post. The New York World called Roden's response to Thompson and Urbine as, "spineless," and, "particularly timid and uninspiring".

Ultimately, it would take court injunctions to put an end to the Chicago Public Library's censorship activities. Two local lawyers had successfully sued, noting that Chicago's city code named damaging library books a felony. While the promised lakefront bonfire never took place, this episode gave Chicago a period of notoriety as being perceived as, what the Chicago Tribune would retrospectively describe as, "the book-burning capital of the free world".

While he was facing backlash and legal challenges for his efforts to burn books, Thompson denied that he had ever promised to burn books, and disavowed book burning. He declared that he was an emphatic defender of free speech. During the October 27, 1927 hearing, John J. Gorman testified that Thompson found it regrettable that the mayor's "America First" message had been sullied by the "false reports" about book burnings. Despite this, Thompson continued to send letters to the library's board objecting to "pro-British" materials in the Chicago Public Library's collection. The trustees of the library's board of directors sent Thompson a letter in which they stood against his crusade, stating that the library was an institution of unimpaired free speech, stating that the library's collection had a diverse collection of works on controversial subjects such as religion and politics and declaring that their presentation of works containing diverse perspectives on these matters was not an endorsement of any views but rather served to give a free-thinking public access to works of thought.

== Delivery of the verdict ==
McAndrew's contract as superintendent expired January 9, 1928, and was not renewed. However, Chicago Board of Education President J. Lewis Coath stated that the administrative hearing would continue. On March 21, 1928, already two months after McAndrew's term as superintendent had expired, the board found him guilty. The vote to find him guilty was 8–2, with one member absent (Otto L. Schmidt, who had been anticipated to vote against a guilty verdict).

The resolution adopted to find McAndrew guilty was twenty-pages long, and claimed that proof had been presented, "of what William Hale Thompson originally brought to the attention of the public, evidence that there is organized pro-British and anti-American propaganda of stupendous proportions in our country with deep ramification extending to and thru schools and colleges." The resolution made the recommendation that school boards across the United States, "investigate the text books under their jurisdiction to the end that treason tainted textbooks and those responsible for them may be eliminated from the public school systems of the country." The resolution stated that the propaganda is traceable to the English-Speaking Union, Cecil Rhodes Scholarship Foundation, and the Andrew Carnegie Foundation.

Vote on verdict
Board of Education member	Appointed to board by	Vote
Walter H. Brandenburg	William Hale Thompson	Guilty
H. Wallace Caldwell	William Hale Thompson	Guilty
J. Lewis Coath	William Hale Thompson	Guilty
Oscar Durante	William Hale Thompson	Guilty
John A. English	William Emmet Dever	Guilty
Helen Hefferan	William Emmet Dever	Not guilty
James A. Hemingway	William Hale Thompson	Guilty
James Mullenbach	William Emmet Dever	Not guilty
Theophilus Schmid	William Emmet Dever	Guilty
Otto L. Schmidt	William Emmet Dever	Absent
Charles J. Vopicka	William Emmett Dever	Guilty

== Voiding of verdict ==
McAndrew's lawyers immediately petitioned for a writ of certiorari to review the administrative hearing. McAndrew also filed lawsuits against the Board of Education for salary lost and Thompson for libel and slander (suing Thompson for the amount of $250,000). Less than two years after the administrative hearing, in December 1929, Judge Hugo Pam of the Superior Court of Cook County voided the decision by the Board of Education. Pam ruled that McAndrew had not been insubordinate, and that the school board lacked the authority to have tried him for the additional charge stemming from the allegations of pro-British propaganda. Pam dubbed the allegations of pro-British conduct levied against McAndrew, "improper". After this, McAndrew dropped his two lawsuits.

The Chicago Tribune opined,

Dr. McAndrew did not need this formal vindication. He stood higher, perhaps in the esteem of the sincere men and women of Chicago, after his illegal dismissal at the hands of the school board than he did before. But the court's rebuke of the school board removes the merits of the tragic incident beyond all contention and eposes beyond refutation the motives. Dr. McAndrew was the one obstacle to the invasion of the school treasury by the machine. Furthermore, he was an impassable obstacle. So long as Dr. McAndrew remained in charge of the educational system, the school funds would be administered properly.

The New York Sun wrote that, "the absurdity of the charges against McAndrew made no court rule necessary," and that the decision instead had merely affirmed, "the opinion always held by disinterested observers".

The South Bend Tribune opined that,

As is usual hen politicians play football with a school system, the public is left holding the bag. Chicago taxpayers have lost the services of perhaps the ablest superintendent of schools that ever functioned in that city. The taxpayers can't sue for damages, and McAndrew probably wouldn't return to Chicago for any money. Thus, satisfaction with the outcome of the case is restricted to a very small group.

== Disbarment of Gorman for perjury ==
Author David Saville Muzzey had also filed a lawsuit against Thompson and the Chicago Board of Education. On October 11, 1929, John J. Gorman wrote an apology letter David Saville Muzzey admitting that he had never actually read his textbook American History (which he had attacked during the administrative hearing), and that the sworn statements he had made were, in fact, written by someone else. He claimed to have been misled, and to have now realized there was nothing to criticize in Muzzey's textbooks. After Gorman issued this apology, Muzzey withdrew his libel lawsuit against Gorman. However, soon after John J. Gorman wrote his apology letter to Muzzey, Chicago Board of Education member James Mullenbach read the letter into the Board's official record and introduced a resolution that would have seen the Chicago Board of Education apologize to Chicagoans for wasting their money on McAndrew's "so-called trial", to Muzzey for the accusations the Board of Education raised against him, and to Charles H. Judd and Charles E. Merriam for accusing them of conspiring against the city's children. However, this resolution was buried in committee. Mullenbach also called for the Cook County state's attorney and the Chicago Bar Association to take note that Gorman had admitted to perjury. Ultimately, in December 1931, the Supreme Court of Illinois disbarred Gorman.
