= William McAndrew =

American educational leader, later editor (1863–1937)

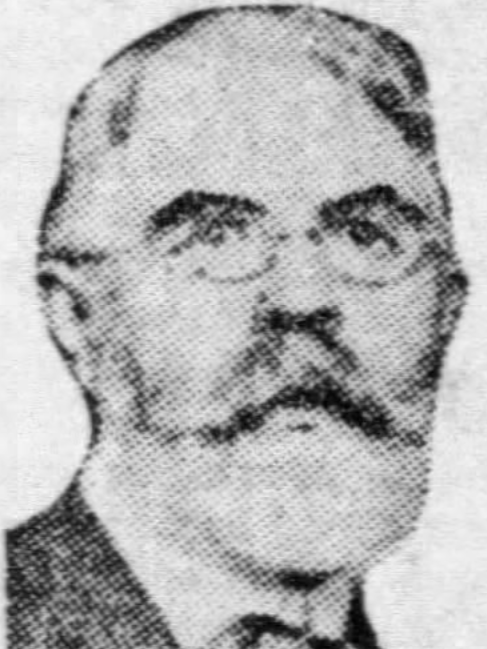
- McAndrew, c. 1925

13th Superintendent of Chicago Public Schools
- In office January 9, 1924 – January 9, 1928 (suspended August 29, 1927–January 9, 1928)
- Preceded by: Peter A. Mortenson
- Succeeded by: William J. Bogan

Member of the Board of Associate Superintendents of New York City Board of Education
- In office October 28, 1914 – January 1924
- Preceded by: Edward L. Stevens
- Succeeded by: Harrold C. Campbell and Charles W. Lyon

Superintendent of Schools for St. Clair, Michigan
- In office 1886–1887
- Preceded by: William Galpin
- Succeeded by: J. C. Shattuck

Personal details
- Born: August 20, 1863 Ypsilanti, Michigan, U.S.
- Died: June 13, 1937 (age 73) Mamaroneck, New York, U.S.
- Resting place: Ypsilanti, Michigan, U.S.
- Spouse: Susan Irvine Gurney
- Children: 3
- Parents: William McAndrew Sr. (father); Helen Walker (mother)
- Education: University of Michigan (BA); Michigan State Normal School (M.Ed)
- Profession: Educator; editor

William McAndrew Jr. (August 20, 1863 – June 13, 1937) was an American educator and editor who served as Superintendent of Chicago Public Schools in the 1920s. McAndrew was, for a time, one of the best-known educators in the United States.

Before becoming Chicago superintendent, he worked as superintendent of schools in St. Clair, Michigan, as a principal in Chicago, and as a principal and assistant superintendent of schools for New York City. During his more than three-decades (1892–1924) as a school administrator in New York, McAndrew garnered national attention and esteem in his field, becoming widely-known and well-regarded as a leading figure in the field of education. His philosophies about education (which took inspiration from scientific management movement advocate Frederick Winslow Taylor) received attention.

McAndrew made numerous reforms within Chicago Public Schools, including establishing middle schools, implementing standardized testing, expanding vocational training, enacting rigid requirements and supervision of teachers, and championing the creation of a mandatory retirement age. While he garnered national reverence in some circles, he also became an enemy of local teacher unions, which disapproved of his elimination of teachers' councils and strict rules in governing teachers. In Chicago, McAndrew attracted significant criticism for what detractors characterized as an autocratic leadership style, as well as national renown and praise for a number of his successes as a school administrator. He was the subject of hyperbolic political attacks by William Hale Thompson during Thompson's campaign in the 1927 Chicago mayoral election. After Thompson took office as mayor in April 1927, his adversarial tact towards McAndrew led to a highly-publicized administrative hearing conducted by the Chicago Board of Education. The board suspended McAndrew from acting as superintendent pending the result of the hearing and eventually found him guilty of various charges, but the Superior Court of Cook County would later void this ruling.

Later in his life, McAndrew was an editor of both the Educational Review and School and Society, and continued this work until his death. Educator Robert J. Havighurst described him as "a man of great self-confidence, well educated, and honorable in all his dealings", but also as one whose approach to efficiency and administration ultimately conflicted with the Chicago teachers and schools he sought to change under his leadership.

== Early life, family, and education ==
McAndrew was born on August 20, 1863, in Ypsilanti, Michigan. His parents were both Scottish immigrants to the United States. McAndrew's father, William McAndrew, was a furniture maker, and his mother, Helen Walker McAndrew (née Walker), was an obstetrician, and the first female physician in Michigan. He was their second-born son, and had an older brother named Thomas.

His parents were political liberals and were involved in local reform activism. They hosted Sunday afternoon forums which drew participants such as social reformer and women's rights activist Susan B. Anthony and temperance reform activist John Bartholomew Gough to speak at their meetings. McAndrew's father would later quit his profession to join McAndrew's mother to operate a sanatorium she founded.

McAndrew graduated from the local Ypsilanti elementary school and from Ypsilanti High School. He studied at Michigan State Normal School before entering the University of Michigan, where he graduated as a member of Phi Beta Kappa in 1886 with a Bachelor of Arts from the university's literary department. McAndrew later returned to Michigan State Normal School to receive his Master of Education in 1916.

== Early career ==
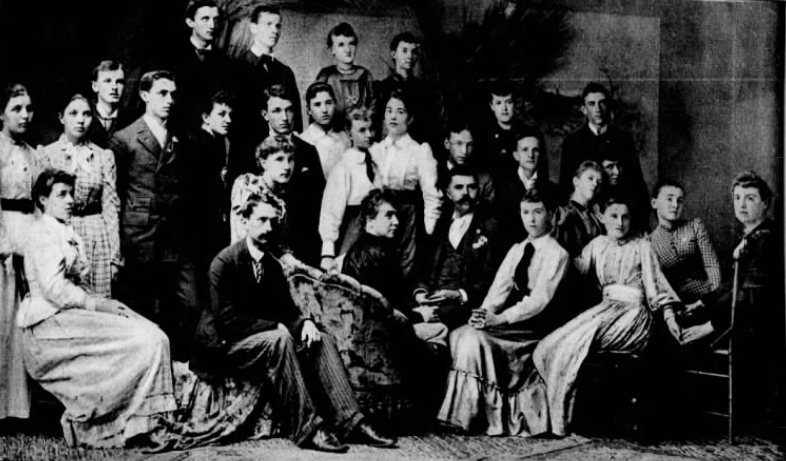
McAndrew and faculty pose for a photo with the Hyde Park High School graduating class of 1891

Upon his graduation from the University of Michigan, McAndrew became superintendent of schools for St. Clair, Michigan, serving in this role from 1886 through 1887.

In 1888, McAndrew moved to Chicago and became one of the first five teachers at the new Hyde Park High School. He was promoted as the school's principal the following year. McAndrew's tenure as principal would end in June 1891, when he was fired for insubordination. His firing was due to his refusing to certify a fraudulent diploma that falsely declared that a book publisher's son had successfully completed a course of study in botany that he had actually failed. Superintendent George Howland had ordered McAndrew to certify this diploma, arguing that the course was not a prerequisite for college. Thereafter, McAndrew momentarily left field of education and, in July 1891, became an advertising manager and district passenger agent in Saint Paul, Minnesota, for the Great Northern Railway.

== New York City ==
=== Principal of Pratt Institute High School ===
McAndrew served as the principal of the Pratt Institute High School (Public School 44) in Brooklyn, New York for a decade (1892–1902). While serving as a principal in Brooklyn, McAndrew was connected with the Brooklyn Institute (including serving atenure as a president of its Department of Geography) and was an active member of the Brooklyn Teachers Association. He also served as president of the School Masters' Association of New York. When New York City consolidated in 1898, McAndrew's job as the principal of a public school in Brooklyn brought under the auspices of New York City Public Schools.

=== Principal of Washington Irving High School ===
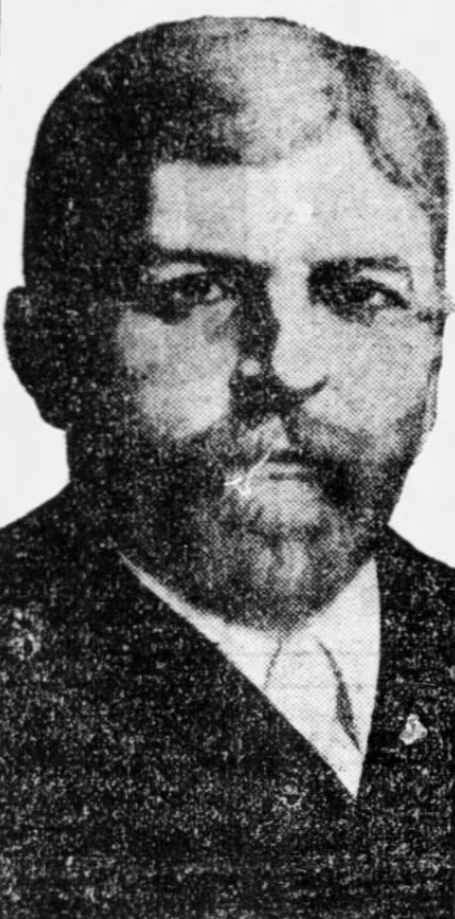
McAndrew c. 1912

McAndrew was involved in founding the Washington Irving High School, a girls-only school in Manhattan, and served as its inaugural principal for the twelve years following its establishment in 1902. His selection as principal came through a balloting process that saw him defeat a large number of other candidates. Under his leadership, Irving became the most publicized high school the city during his tenure, and was regarded as a leading institution among all-girls schools in the United States. By 1912, the school had approximately 8,000 pupils. In 1912, the Journal of Education wrote that McAndrew had, "attained world-wide fame as the principal of the Washington Irving High School." In late 1914, McAndrew was described by the Journal of Education as having established himself as, "one of New York's best known public school men".

==== Declining the position of Detroit superintendent ====
In 1912, McAndrew was recommended as a prospective candidate for the position of Superintendent of Detroit Public Schools, with former president of the University of Michigan James Burrill Angell supporting his candidacy. Detroit's Board of Education voted 10–8 on July 18, 1912 to select McAndrew as their superintendent, ousting fifteen-year incumbent Wales C. Martindale from his post in a single round of balloting. The Detroit Board of Education anticipated that McAndrew, being from outside the city, could be uninvolved as superintendent in the city's political tumult. However, McAndrew declined the position. At the meeting where the Detroit Board of Education had voted to select McAndrew, they also voted to keep the superintendent's annual salary at the $6,000 that Martindale had been earning. This salary, seen as relatively low for McAndrew, was seen as one of the obstacles to Detroit securing his acceptance of the position. Discord within the Detroit schools was also seen as a deterrence to McAndrew. The Detroit Free Press wrote,

There is practically nothing in the job that should appeal to a person holding the positions and drawing the salaries which are McAndrew's as long as he remains in New York, and there are, on the other hand, many features of the local situation which ought to repel him.

In late July, McAndrew tentatively accepted the Detroit superintendent position, conditioning his acceptance on the Detroit Board of Education applying a merit system to protect against political influence on appointments and promotions. The Detroit Board of Education agreed to adopt this change. However, by August 2, 1912, McAndrew had informed the board that he changed his mind about accepting the position.

=== Associate Superintendent of Schools of New York City ===
On October 28, 1914, McAndrew was promoted to one of eight seats on the Board of Associate Superintendents of the New York City Board of Education. President of the board Thomas W. Churchill supported McAndrew for the position. However, McAndrew's selection was opposed by New York City Mayor John Purroy Mitchel. Despite McAndrew's decade of work in Brooklyn as principal of the Pratt Institute High School, it was reported that a number of Brooklyn members of the board had stood together in opposition to McAndrew. McAndrew's support was reported to have come more strongly from Manhattan members of the board. However, McAndrew was reported to have received a number of Brooklyn members' votes, which put him over the top on the final ballot. During the selection process, most of the eleven other candidates submitted their own applications for the job, but McAndrew had not personally sought the office himself. After ten rounds of balloting, McAndrew was elected, defeating Brooklyn District Superintendent Charles W. Lyon, who had been the front-runner.

October 28, 1914 balloting for associate superintendent of Schools of New York City
Note: 24 votes needed to win
Candidate	Round 1	Round 2	Round 3	Round 4	Round 5	Round 6	Round 7	Round 8	Round 9	Round 10
William McAndrew	8	15	17	17	17	17	20	20	22	24
Charles W. Lyon	7	7	19	21	21	21	21	21	21	18
Edgar Dubs Shimer	—N/a	6	4	4	4	3	2	—N/a	1	1
John Dwyer	7	5	4	2	2	2	1	—N/a	—N/a	—N/a
Edward W. Stitt	4	—N/a	2	1	—N/a	—N/a	—N/a	—N/a	—N/a	—N/a
Darwin L. Bardwell	10	10	1	—N/a	—N/a	—N/a	—N/a	—N/a	—N/a	—N/a
Jerome A. O'Connell	—N/a	2	—N/a	—N/a	—N/a	—N/a	—N/a	—N/a	—N/a	—N/a
Cornelius F. Franklin	3	—N/a	—N/a	—N/a	—N/a	—N/a	—N/a	—N/a	—N/a	—N/a
Grace C. Strachan	1	—N/a	—N/a	—N/a	—N/a	—N/a	—N/a	—N/a	—N/a	—N/a
Henry L. Jenkins	—N/a	—N/a	—N/a	—N/a	—N/a	—N/a	—N/a	—N/a	—N/a	—N/a
John F. Reigart	—N/a	—N/a	—N/a	—N/a	—N/a	—N/a	—N/a	—N/a	—N/a	—N/a
Joseph S. Taylor	—N/a	—N/a	—N/a	—N/a	—N/a	—N/a	—N/a	—N/a	—N/a	—N/a

McAndrew served on the board until he assumed his role in Chicago in January 1924. Among the tasks assigned to McAndrew at various points on the job was oversight over its "new-program" schools, the "duplicate and intermediate" schools, and Division No. 1 elementary schools.

During this time McAndrew built up his reputation as a powerful writer and orator on topics related to education, and became a leading figure in the field. McAndrew became a well-known author, both authoring a series of popular magazine articles and writing articles for scholarly publications such as the Educational Review and The World's Work. His work for the latter publication received praise from the Albert Edward Winship-edited Journal of Education . The Journal called McAndrew "a genius in the interpretation of the significance of educational utterances as well as a master of the art of putting his interpretation compellingly." McAndrew also served on the advisory board of The School Review an academic journal dedicated to the subject of secondary education published by the University of Chicago.

McAndrew generally avoided politics. However, this did not stop him from being entangled in political battles. By the end of his tenure, McAndrew had come into conflict with the Tammany Hall-aligned majority that sat on the Board of Education. By the later part of 1917 he was seen as coming into conflict with the Tammany Democratic Party political organization over a program that McAndrew spearheaded to establish "new-program schools" in the city which adhered to new methods of education such as the "platoon system" (also known as the "Gary Plan", developed by William Wirt in Gary, Indiana). While he was in office, the administration of Republican Mayor John Purroy Mitchel supported this effort. Tammany Hall, on the other hand, opposed the program. McAndrew also supported the policies of controversial superintendent William L. Ettinger, which divided the Board of Superintendents. Two years before leaving for New York City he had several politicians oppose his reappointment as associate superintendent. In spite of this opposition, the school board unanimously reelected him.

=== Reputation during tenure in New York City ===
While working in New York, McAndrew garnered an esteemed reputation as an educator. His philosophies on education (inspired by scientific management movement founder Frederick Winslow Taylor) were publicized by the New York state board of education and the media. In praise of McAndrew, in 1914 the Brooklyn Times-Union called McAndrew one of the, "most progressive men," in New York City's public school system, while the journal School wrote,

William McAndrew is the most original genius in the public school system of New York City. The Washington Irving High School is his creation and it is unique among the great secondary schools in the United States. It has evoked the admiration of foreign educational authorities.

In 1917, McAndrew's was characterized by the Brooklyn Daily Eagle as being energetic and unpredictable in his approach as an educator, with the newspaper describing McAndrew as, "a live wire" in the field of education. Upon his departure from New York in 1924, The New York Times wrote that McAndrew had given the school system, "a quarter century of cheerful, unconventionally efficient, outstanding service," going on to declare that, during his tenure in New York City Public Schools, McAndrew,

Gave to Washington Irving High School a personality and has been a humanizing force in a system which with the inevitable tendency towards mechanization constantly needs ideals in the teachers and those who lead the teachers.

McAndrew was well regarded by other leading educators. One example of this is the results of a 1918 survey in which the New York Tribune surveyed individuals described as "leading educators" on the who they thought would be best fit individual to serve as the next superintendent of New York Public Schools. The survey was sent to 200 "experts", and saw 72 responses. When it was asked as an open question, McAndrew placed second with eight votes, placing only behind Detroit Public Schools Superintendent Charles Chadsey, who received eleven votes. When the question was asked with options limited to eight well-known associate superintendents of the New York City Public Schools, McAndrew was the choice of a majority of the respondents, with 39 votes. In the article that accompanied the results of the survey, New York Tribune opined that McAndrew was the best-known of the city's associate superintendents, and wrote,

He has spoken frequently and two public effect on the public platform. He is popular. Many of those who have heard him retain pleasant recollections of the experience. The replies never tire of saying that he is "brilliant", "original", "progressive". A few intimate that he may be too radical. But otherwise, there is no discordant note in the applause. The concrete reason given for his eminence, however, is almost invariably his public speaking."

McAndrew was mentioned as a prospective replacement for outgoing New York state deputy commissioner of education Thomas E. Finegan, but McAndrew was ultimately not chosen for this position. In 1918, McAndrew was one of many names mentioned as a potential choice to be the new New York City public school superintendent. At that time, the New York Tribune conducted a survey in which seventy-eight education leaders from across the United States (district superintendents, state superintendents, journal editors, educational association leaders) opined on the individuals that were being floated as potential contenders for the New York City Public Schools superintendency. Forty-six of the participating experts were asked to comment on McAndrew, with their comments being overwhelmingly positive on his suitability for the superintendency. Comments largely praised him as being brilliant thinker with both a strong understanding of education theory and strong contributions of his own to the field. His skill and wide repute as a speaker and writer were also noted. Comments noted that he enjoyed a positive reputation, and largely opined that held solid ideas and a strong understanding of New York City's schools. Many praiseful comments described him as a "progressive" educator, and several praising him as being original and "radical" within the field of education. One however expressed concern that his "progressive character" would result in him being "too assertive" in personality to meet the leadership style needed for the city's district.

Upon McAndrew's 1924 departure from the city, Superintendent of Schools of New York City William L. Ettinger remarked on McAndrew,

He has been a tower of strength for the school system. He has had much difficult work and has always done it loyally and efficiently. The present building of Washington Irving High School is largely a monument to his efforts.

== Superintendent of Chicago Public Schools ==
=== Appointment ===
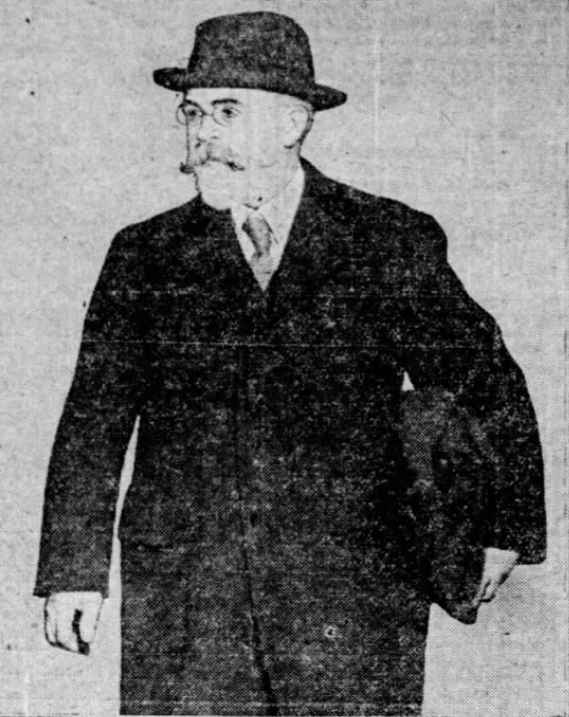
McAndrew in Chicago on February 2, 1924

In the Chicago mayoral election of 1923, the city of Chicago elected William Emmett Dever, a reformer, as its mayor. Early into his mayoralty, Dever appointed seven new members to the Chicago Board of Education, the city's school board. Throughout his tenure, Dever would keep the board independent from political interference. This was in contrast to Dever's predecessor, William Hale Thompson, under whose previous mayoralty the schools had been tarnished by politics and fraud.

The Dever-shaped school board sought to find a superintendent that would strengthen the educational authority of the office, cut fiscal waste, and improve educational standards. McAndrew was appointed superintendent of Chicago Public Schools on January 9, 1924. He agreed to take the job after being reassured by the Chicago Board of Education that they would "clean up" the administration of the city's schools.

McAndrew’s selection for the position was a compromise, as four of the members of the school board favored a Chicago educator, Lane Tech High School principal William J. Bogan. On the final vote, board member John Dill Robertson abstained from casting a vote, denying McAndrew a true unanimous vote of support. McAndrew was elected to a four-year tenure with the annual salary of the superintendent newly raised from $12,000 to $15,000, making him, perhaps, the highest-paid educator in the United States at the time.

Many greeted McAndrew's appointment as a positive outcome. They hoped that McAndrew would restore faith in a school system that had endured years of scandal and discord. Among those approving of McAndrew’s appointment was Margaret Haley, the powerful chief of the Chicago Teachers' Federation (CTF), as well as the former favorite for the position, principal Bogan. McAndrew's appointment also received the support of the Bureau of Public Efficiency, the Public Education Association, and CTF. McAndrew would hold the title of superintendent of Chicago Public Schools from 1924 through 1927.

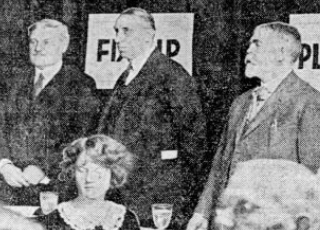
From left to right: Mayor William Emmett Dever, Raymond P. Ensign (chairman of the Chicago Association of Commerce committee), and William McAndrew at an event in March 1924

=== Dealings with teachers ===
McAndrew developed a combative relationship with the school districts' teachers. McAndrew saw teachers as a threat to his authority, and largely disregarded their concerns over his changes. He also encouraged school principals to be more strict in their administration. He opposed efforts by teachers, politicians, and businessmen to impose educational policy. McAndrew was more interested in seeking the advice of businessmen than that of parents or teacher's unions, particularly when it came to advice for improving efficiency.

Influenced by the theory of scientific management, early into his tenure, McAndrew implemented a series of changes that made the school system run with greater efficiency. He began by requiring school board staff to wear uniforms, prohibited teachers from attending meetings during school hours, decreased the number of holidays, and imposed time checks for all Chicago Board of Education employees. While McAndrew’s initial reforms were mostly well received, they, angered teachers and a number of politicians. Many teachers opposed his strict and quick changes, including Margaret Haley, the leader of the teacher union.

McAndrew stressed the importance of business efficiency, imposing greater supervision over teachers, including fixed criteria which did not make any variances for the size of classrooms or the backgrounds of the pupils. To enforce adherence to his new policies, he put in place a supervision system which required teachers to fill out time sheets four times per day, and which disciplined teachers for inefficiencies reported by this system. McAndrew extended the number of supervisory staff in Chicago Public Schools. By 1926, the district had five assistant superintendents, fourteen district supervisors, and fifteen directors of special subjects. Teachers disliked this, believing that it diminished their role in setting curriculum and evaluation standards. Additionally, female teachers took issue with the increase in the size of a supervisory staff that was the largely male.

Organized labor, particularly the Chicago Federation of Teachers, had moved strongly against McAndrew by September 1924, when he moved to eliminate teachers councils. It was unmistakenable that, by the end of 1925, McAndrew had made an enemy of the city's three large teachers unions. McAndrew had become unpopular among teachers. Chicago Federation of Teachers leader Margaret Haley was a particularly strong McAndrew opponent. McAndrew was characterized as an autocrat by Florence Hanson of the Women's High School Teachers' Federation and C.W. Stillman of the Federation of Men Teachers at the annual meeting of the American Federation of Teachers in 1925. However, Stillwell softened his portrayal, conceding that McAndrew was "an autocrat with good educational ideas".

==== Teachers' councils ====
A particularly strong point of contention between McAndrew and teachers was his opposition to the existence of teachers' councils. Early into his tenure in 1924, McAndrew fought to stop teachers' councils from holding meetings during school hours. McAndrew proposed a change to the rules allowing him to organize the meetings of teachers as he liked. The Chicago Board of Education voted to pass this rule 6-3 in September 1924, allowing McAndrew to finally eliminate the teachers' councils.

McAndrew presented a plan to the board to replace the teachers’ councils with a council of organizations that would advise the superintendent by request only. The proposed members would consist of four principals (one elementary school, one middle school, one high school, and one district principal), the superintendent, representatives of the three large teachers unions, and a small number of truant officers chosen by the City Civil Service Commission. According to this proposal, the principals and superintendent, as a group, would have more voting power than the three large teachers unions would have collectively. Additionally, the truant officers would have the same voting power as each of the three large teachers unions. The board approved the plan in April 1925. The plan drew outrage from teachers and their unions.

==== Effort to increase salaries for teachers ====
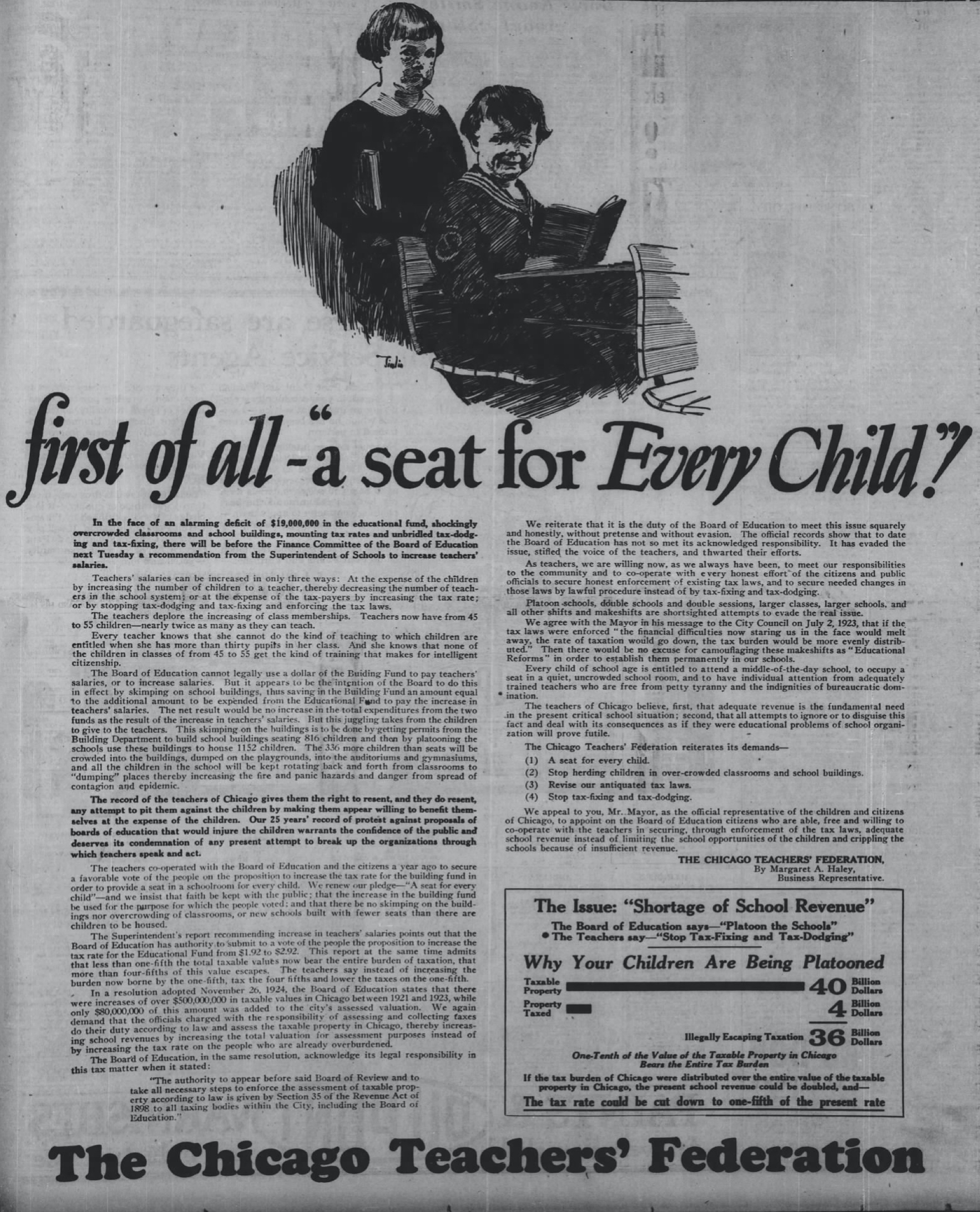
The Chicago Teachers' Federation ran a full-page newspaper advertisement in the Chicago Tribune opposing McAndrew's plan to increase pay for teachers (March 15, 1925)

At the time that McAndrew took office as superintendent, the teachers of Chicago received lesser salaries than teachers in other major cities. Teacher salaries had neither kept up with the increase of salaries in other fields, nor with the increase in the cost of living. From the beginning of his tenure as superintendent, McAndrew advocated for an increase in the salaries of teachers in order to address this problem. McAndrew appointed a large committee of approximately 100 members who spent six months creating salary increase schedules, and their report was submitted to members of the Chicago Board of Education on March 6, 1925.

Edward B. Ellicott, the president of the board at the time, opposed McAndrew's wage increase proposal, arguing that it would increase the board's deficit. Margaret Haley and her Chicago Federation of Teachers opposed the plan for the salary increase, arguing that the funds necessary for the salary increase were not available, and that lower ranked teachers would only receive small raises while principals and assistant superintendents would instead benefit from substantial raises. The union accused McAndrew of using the pay increase scheme as a veiled attempted to break apart all of the teachers unions. Civic organizations, on the other hand, supported McAndrew's plan for increasing salaries for teachers.

The Chicago Board of Education voted on April 27, 1925 to request popular approval from the public to increase the educational purpose tax rate from $1.92 to $2.92 to fund a plan to finance salary increases and save the school system from a financial crisis. On April 28, 1927, the board unanimously passed a resolution petitioning the Chicago City Council to create a public referendum for approval of such a tax increase.

==== Effort to implement a mandatory retirement age ====
In 1925, McAndrew supported a bill introduced by Lindblom High School teacher and Illinois state representative Walter R. Miller that required the immediate retirement of public school teachers over 75 years old, and after five years, reduce the mandatory retirement age to 70. It also provided an annuity of $1,500 for the remainder of their lives. The bill was written by attorneys at the Board of Education at the request of McAndrew. The state legislature passed the bill, but the clerk of the Illinois House of Representatives refused to send it to the governor due to a disputed technicality, so it did not become a law at the time.

After the failure of Miller’s bill, the board, at McAndrew's urging, tried again, adopting a similar rule, known as the "Emeritus Rule", on December 9, 1925. The law imposed a mandatory retirement of 70 years old for all teachers, except the superintendent. The Chicago Federation of Labor stood in strong opposition to the Emeritus Rule, and it faced many legal challenges. Edward F. Dunne, the former governor of Illinois, filed a lawsuit against the rule, representing 74 teachers and principals who would be forced to retire by the new rule. Dunne's son and attorneys from the Chicago Federation of Teachers were also involved in the case. Cook County Circuit Court judge Hugo Friend denied the teachers an injunction in September 1926. Dunne appealed the case to the Supreme Court of Illinois, arguing that the rule violated the tenure of office law. The court ruled in October 1926 that the board had no authority to pass the Emeritus Rule, ordering the board to restore the jobs of the teachers it forced to retire and to pay them back salary, which came out to approximately $250,000.

Dunne's state supreme court victory, however, was partially undercut. While Dunne had been in the process of appealing the case against the Emeritus Rule to the Illinois Supreme Court, Illinois Attorney General Oscar E. Carlstrom sent Speaker of the Illinois House of Representatives Robert Scholes an opinion that the original law introduced by Miller in the Illinois State Legislature had in fact been passed by the legislature. The bill was finally sent to the governor on May 19, 1926, a year after it had originally passed. It was signed into law by Governor Len Small, and took effect on July 1, 1926, which meant that the Chicago Public Schools only had to rehire those under the age of 75 after the Supreme Court's ruling.

=== Curriculum ===
Four months into his tenure, McAndrew submitted his first annual report to the Board of Education. It recommended significant reforms, such as using the service center concept of schooling, which emphasized instruction in citizenship, civic service, and ideals of character. McAndrew supported the expansion of vocational training programs in the city. The report also advised using experimental classes and adopting the Winnetka Plan for vocational training and individual instruction. McAndrew proposed increasing the use of research, test data, and teacher observations and ratings to enhance teaching, and to increase the focus on moral, religious, and physical education. The report proposed restructuring the administration of schools with the creation of assistant and district superintendents. McAndrew’s report also called into question the value of teaching the Latin language and classical studies, as they were seen as at odds with his advocacy for a practical studies curriculum.

Reflecting his preference in taking the advice of businessmen over parents and teachers' unions, McAndrew created a curriculum that was favored by businessmen. The goal of his curriculum was to produce students with skills that would meet the demands of the marketplace. To this end, he implemented programs of complete mastery for the basics of reading, writing, and arithmetic. Although McAndrew designed the curriculum to favor employers, he did not believe that they should ever be entrusted with direct control over schools. All of these combined efforts allowed McAndrew to receive the support and backing of the city's business community. Reflecting his interest in business efficiency, against opposition, McAndrew implemented standardized testing, as well as IQ testing.

=== Opening of new schools ===
The school district underwent a construction boom in 1926, with thirty-two new school buildings completed that year. This was three times as many new school buildings as had been completed in the city in any prior year. Proposed sites for new schools in the city now utilized scientific studies to find the best locations based on population and other factors. To provide guidance for buildings and sites throughout the system, McAndrew established the Bureau of Building Survey to collect information from educators and architects. The new bureau was responsible for drawing attendance boundaries, choosing sites for schools, recommending new structures and additions, and providing research on different aspects of educational facilities. This new method for school planning was retained by the school system for decades.

==== Middle schools ====
Chicago established its first middle schools during McAndrew’s tenure as superintendent. Previous to this, four middle schools were approved in Chicago in 1918, but not yet in place. The Chicago Board of Education established a committee in 1923 to study the feasibility of using the junior high school model in the city, eventually approving and adopting it in 1924. To increase the wider adoption of middle schools in the city, McAndrew sought the approval of the Elementary General Council.

Teacher representatives expressed concern as to whether middle schools would or would not offer terminal programs for children who would not attend high school. When asked, McAndrew refused to give a direct answer. This lack of communication gave birth to strong suspicions that McAndrew intended to use the middle schools to move working class students into vocational programs while preparing wealthier students for high school. These fears gave birth to opposition, with the Chicago Teachers' Federation opposing the plan for middle schools. Other groups such as the Chicago Federation of Labor and the Federation of Men's Teachers opposed adopting middle schools system-wide, proposing to only adopt them as a smaller-scale experiment. The Federation of Women Teachers gave their qualified support to the middle school plan. McAndrew went ahead with his plan for middle schools, and the city's first middle schools opened in September 1924. Despite the opposition to the idea, the fears surrounding the establishment of middle schools were unfounded and never came to pass.

McAndrew unsuccessfully proposed running the new middle schools on the platoon system. The committee of the Chicago Board of Education was sharply split on the idea of the platoon system. Teachers in the city and the teachers' councils were opposed to it. The Women's City Club, which included McAndrew's wife on the board, supported the idea, but members who were high school teachers resigned from the club over their position. McAndrew believed that the platoon system was a cost-effective means of running schools.

=== National praise and notability ===
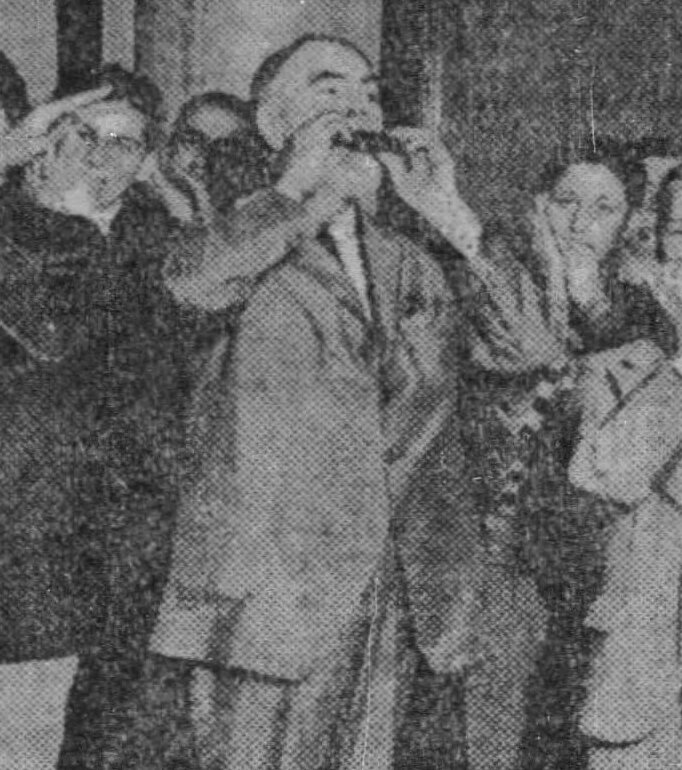
McAndrew playing harmonicas with New York City school students that visited him in Chicago in 1926

McAndrew attracted national attention and praise as superintendent, becoming one of the best-known educators in the United States. The Central New Jersey Home News in September 1925 called McAndrew,

A man who is not only brilliant in his profession, but one who is, also, beloved by thousands. He is keenly sought as a speaker and has been heard at national and state meetings of an educational nature.

The New York Times considered the administration of Chicago Public Schools to be one of the greatest successes of Mayor Dever's administration, particularly when compared to how the schools were run during the administration of Dever's predecessor William Hale Thompson. On March 28, 1927, The New York Times wrote that,

No work of Mayor Dever's Administration has been more praiseworthy than the improvement and extension of the public school system, the seat of enormous mismanagement and inefficiency under Thompsonism."

Among McAndrew's successes was that an increase in spending had provided teachers and students with greater access to resources than they had ever been provided with for.

McAndrew was elected head of the National Education Association's Department of Superintendence on February 27, 1924. He was succeeded in this role by Frank Ballou on February 25, 1925.

=== Political opposition to McAndrew ===
The Chicago political machine was also frequently in opposition to McAndrew, and within just months of the beginning of his tenure, some demanded he resign, but the Board of Education continued to support him. McAndrew attracted continued criticism and opposition from Chicago Federation of Labor and its president John Fitzpatrick. By 1926, Chicago Alderman Leo M. Brieske, who chaired the Chicago City Council's schools committee, wanted to see McAndrew ousted from his job. Brieske took issue with McAndrew, who was seen to be from New York City, declaring that local men should hold local offices in Chicago instead of transplants. Brieske launched an investigation into appointees for the Board of Education, laying the groundwork to oust McAndrew. In a surprise move, Mayor Dever broke his neutrality amid a school board dispute and on December 5, 1926, he sided with Brieske by saying that it would be preferable to see McAndrew replaced with a new superintendent. Dever declared that he believed the superintendent should instead be a native Chicagoan, declaring, "I am heartily in accord with Alderman Brieske's stand that Chicagoans should fill Chicago offices. We have plenty of capable persons at home, without bringing in outsiders".

=== Attacks by William Hale Thompson ===
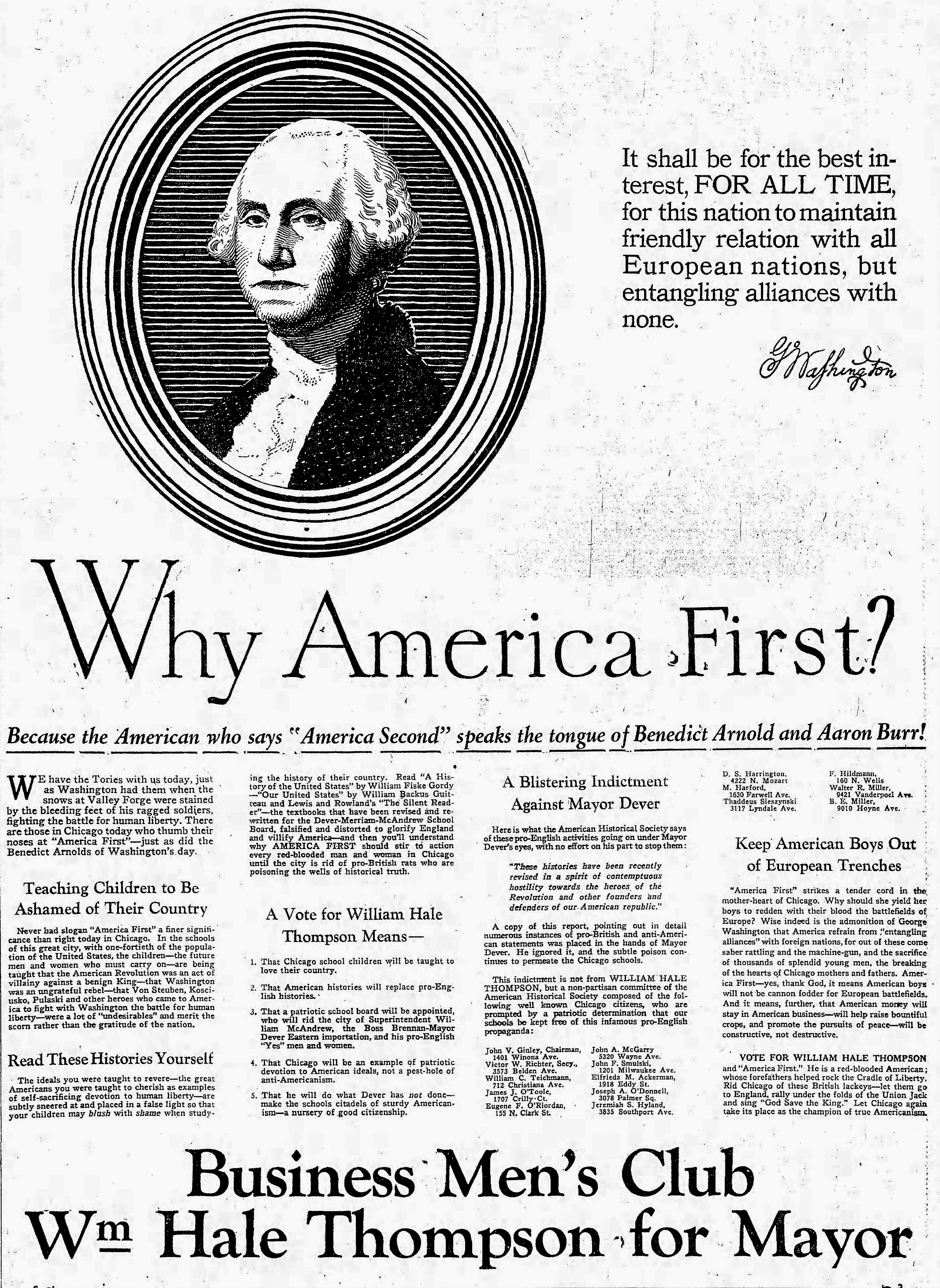
Full-page Thompson campaign ad attacking McAndrew (March 30, 1927)

In the 1920s, a wave of Anglophobia occurred in the United States, with rampant hostility between the U.S. and the United Kingdom. Critics and opportunists took advantage of these political tensions, alleging American textbooks contained "pro-British" and "unamerican" bias. During his successful 1927 campaign against incumbent Democratic mayor William Emmett Dever, Republican nominee William Hale Thompson alleged that McAndrew was a British agent sent by King George as part of a grand conspiracy to manipulate the minds of American children, setting the groundwork for the UK to repossess the U.S. Thompson also accused the "left-handed Irishman" Dever of being part of the plot. Thompson's attacks on McAndrew were a major factor in his successful campaign.

Thompson’s attacks on McAndrew drew upon his published criticism. Back in January 1926, McAndrew wrote an article critical of Archibald Willard's The Spirit of '76, calling it an inaccurate picture of war. The Chicago chapter of the Daughters of the American Revolution condemnded McAndrews criticism. Alderman John Coughlin called McAndrew's comments traitorous, going so far as to propose legislation to denounce McAndrew. However, Alderman William D. Meyering, a decorated veteran of World War I, agreed with McAndrew's statement, and his support put an end to Coughlin's proposed ordinance.

Thompson also criticized McAndrew for allowing the use of unpatriotic textbooks, which he claimed were full of "treason tainted histories". Previously, in 1926, the Citizens' Committee on School Histories, a group led by far-right United States Congressman John J. Gorman, denounced three American history textbooks used by the Chicago Public Schools as pro-British, arguing that heroes of other nationalities had been overlooked. At the time, the group demanded that McAndrew remove from the school curriculum a list of books they alleged were "pro-British". While Mayor Dever brought this document to McAndrew's attention, McAndrew did not give it any concern.

Thompson made further attacks on McAndrew and the school system he oversaw, alleging that new buildings in the Chicago Public Schools system were unsafe because of unsound structural support arches. Seeking the votes of African-Americans, Thompson seized on McAndrew's alleged failure to act upon complaints in 1926 by The Chicago Defender that there were anti-black stereotypes in high school civics textbooks authored by the University of Chicago. After these complaints were made, the school board, not McAndrew, acted to request changes in the books. Thompson also characterized McAndrew as an autocratic individual focused on social efficiency, a characterization which appealed towards disapproval towards McAndrew of teachers, organized labor, and working class parents.

Thompson’s campaign promised to appoint "a patriotic school board...who will rid the city of Superintendent McAndrew," and "his pro-English 'yes' men and women". He blamed Dever and Democratic political boss George E. Brennan for hiring McAndrew.

McAndrew did not stay neutral in the mayoral race. In an unprecedented move for a Chicago school superintendent, he signed a letter urging support for Dever's campaign. McAndrew printed copies of this letter in school print shops and had the Women's City Club distribute them to each of the school system's school principals. He also showed his support for Dever at a public dinner on his behalf hosted by the Women's City Club.

While it is not clear why Thompson chose to focus on attacking McAndrew, political scientist Dennis F. Thompson believes that Thompson might have chosen McAndrew as an enemy, in part, due to McAndrew’s opposition to political patronage in schools, McAndrew's ties to Dever, and McAndrew’s unpopularity with teachers. Dennis F. Thompson argues that there is strong evidence that teachers actively backed Thompson's candidacy to oust McAndrew. Additionally, Thompson had, in the past, already appealed to the city's German and Irish populations by positioning himself as anti-British.

=== Initial months of Thompson mayoralty ===
Thompson won the 1927 mayoral election and was sworn in on April 18 of that year. In his inaugural address, Thompson declared,

I will proceed vigorously to oust Superintendent McAndrew from the schools of Chicago, and restore to the school children the true history of George Washington and the other fathers and heroes of our country, and expose the treason and propaganda which insidiously have been injected into our schools and other educational institutions.

Thompson was impatient to get rid of McAndrew, but McAndrew still had nine months left in his contract as superintendent. According to state law, McAndrew could only be dismissed by the Chicago Board of Education after a trial, which would need to be held no less than thirty days after any charges made against him.

About a month after the new mayor took office, tension began to become apparent between McAndrew and the Chicago City Council. On May 16, alderman Wiley M. Mills, a former Board of Education member and an ally of Margaret Haley, sent McAndrew a letter asking him to explain a statement he made previously in 1924, shortly before the board had selected him as superintendent. The Chicago Tribune had quoted McAndrew at the time saying that he had been brought to the city to "loose the hold of the City Hall and certain outside agencies on the schools". Mills pressed McAndrew on the three-year old quote, demanding that he explain who he was saying had brought him to Chicago, and what specific agencies he was describing. McAndrew responded to the query, listing the members of the board that voted in favor of his appointment, and provided a greater description of the circumstances of the out of context quote being used against him. In his response, McAndrew said that the "city school systems…had ejected political influence from promotions, choices of sites and textbooks and improved their services". McAndrew’s response did not stop the persistent attacks. On May 19, the City Council Committee on Schools, Fire and Civil Service requested that he appear before them. After this, the new Board of Education Committee on School Administration approved a resolution saying McAndrew should obey the City Council's summons. McAndrew resisted, writing the chairman, "Your resolution suggests that you are proposing to try me before your committee. I don't see what, other than personal satisfaction to yourself, could come of it. Much as I love you, I'll have to deny myself that favor to you."

A week later, J. Lewis Coath, Mayor Thompson's personally-backed candidate for president of the Chicago Board of Education, was elected by the board on May 25. The board voted to select Coath by a 6-3 vote, with three of the votes in Coath's favor coming from board members that had originally been appointed by Dever (the three votes against his appointment also came from Dever appointees). However, the three Dever appointees who voted in support of electing Coath president of the board made it known that they would not back ousting McAndrew as superintendent. Before becoming president, Coath had spent months as McAndrew’s main antagonist on the board. By July, Coath escalated the attacks against McAndrew, calling him a "bunk shooting educator" and promising that he would oust him as superintendent before the start of the new school year in September.

=== Administrative hearing ===
==== Background ====
Mayor Thompson soon reshaped the Chicago Board of Education with his new appointments, and by August 1927, it was under his influence. Thompson quickly gained control of the board due to resignations of a number of board members, as well as threats made to remaining members.

In April of that year, the board’s attorney James Todd, at the urging of a Thompson-allied board member, argued that school clerks would have to be selected by the City Civil Service Commission. Since 1909, school clerks in the Chicago Public School system had been certified teachers with clerical duties. On August 3, the board adopted a resolution to dismiss all 350 school clerks and to replace them with Civil Service Commission appointees. The board’s decision outraged McAndrew, who resisted it. He saw the resolution as an attempt by Thompson to return patronage to the education system. Throughout his career, McAndrew had opposed political patronage and favoritism.

Mounting a defense against the board’s decision, McAndrew helped the school clerks prepare to file an injunction against their dismissal. He also appeared as a witness, testifying in favor of an injunction against the board, highlighting the fact that Todd had signed his name without his knowledge.

==== Suspension ====
In response to McAndrew’s reaction, Coath directed Todd to prepare charges against McAndrew, which he filed on August 29, 1927. Todd charged McAndrew with insubordination for supporting the school clerks and for "conduct incompatible and inconsistent with, and in direct violation" of his duties. That same day, by a 6–5 vote, the board voted to suspend McAndrew, charging him with insubordination pending a public administrative hearing to be held before the board to decide whether McAndrew should be removed from office.

With McAndrew’s suspension, the board installed William J. Bogan as acting superintendent to carry out McAndrew’s duties during the suspension period. McAndrew refused to resign, which would have allowed him to avoid an administrative hearing. He declared, "They'll fire me alright, but they'll have to stage a burlesque show to do it." On September 29, McAndrew was read sixteen charges at his arraignment while pleading not guilty to any acts which would be grounds for his removal.

==== Proceedings ====
McAndrew was subjected to a total of 27 hearings with more than 100 witnesses, resulting in more than 6,000 pages of testimony. Mayor Thompson recruited many of the witnesses to strengthen his charges and allegations of propaganda and supposed "un-Americanism" against McAndrew before the board.

The administrative hearing attracted national attention from the media and was treated as a ridiculous example of Chicago's messy politics and a spectacle comparable to the Scopes Trial. Time magazine characterized the Chicago Board of Education as, "a partial set of false teeth in Mayor William Hale Thompson's capable mouth", writing that they had, "orders to chew up Superintendent McAndrew". McAndrew lacked the support of unionized teachers during the hearing, as they opposed the strict rules he had put in place for teachers.

During the first weeks of proceedings, McAndrew was often seen seated, reading a newspaper. On November 20, after six weeks of hearings, McAndrew appeared frustrated, and stood up and asked whether the board would actually address the specific charge they brought against him. Receiving no answer, McAndrew left the hearing, declaring that he would return if the board dismissed the charges. His attorneys joined him in refusing to attend the hearings. In spite of his absence, the administrative hearing continued with McAndrew in absentia.

McAndrew's contract as superintendent finally expired on January 9, 1928; it was not renewed. Two months after McAndrew's term as superintendent had expired, the board found him guilty on March 21. The vote to convict him was 8–2.

==== Post-hearing developments ====
Following McAndrew’s conviction, his attorneys immediately petitioned for a writ of certiorari to review the administrative hearing. McAndrew also filed two lawsuits, one against the Board of Education for lost salary, and another against Mayor Thompson for libel and slander, suing him for $250,000 ($3,945,000 in 2021).

In December 1929, less than two years after the original administrative hearings against McAndrew began, Judge Hugo Pam of the Superior Court of Cook County voided the decision by the Board of Education. Pam ruled that McAndrew was not insubordinate, and that the school board lacked the authority to hear the case for charges stemming from the allegations of pro-British propaganda, describing them as "improper". After Pam’s ruling, McAndrew dropped his lawsuits against the board and Thompson.

=== Subsequent assessments of McAndrew's superintendency ===
In 1930, several years after the end of his tenure, the Chicago Tribune characterized McAndrew as, "a mixture of a stern executive and an idealist". The South Bend Tribune, at this time, described McAndrew as having been, "perhaps the ablest superintendent of schools," that Chicago had ever had.

A 1968 report on the history of Chicago Public Schools by Robert J. Havighurst and others for the United States Department of Health, Education, and Welfare wrote that McAndrew,

Was a man of great self-confidence, well educated, and honorable in all his dealings. Yet he reflected the mood of the 1920's in his worship of business efficiency, organization, and 100% mastery of subject matter. His concept of administration clashed with the philosophy of teacher participation in policy formation which in Chicago stemmed from John Dewey, Francis Parker, and Ella Flagg Young, and which was administratively embodied in the system of Teachers' Councils, which McAndrew discontinued.

A 1988 article published in the Chicago Tribune observed,

McAndrew generally is remembered not as an autocrat but a reform-minded superintendent "persecuted" by Big Bill Thompson, who forced his dismissal in 1928 after a show trial.

== Later career and death ==
After leaving Chicago, McAndrew did some traveling abroad and subsequently spent periods of time living in Mamaroneck, New York. and the Silvermine Hill neighborhood of Norwalk, Connecticut. In 1925, McAndrew succeeded Frank Pierrepont Graves as the editor of the Educational Review. McAndrew would continue to serve as editor of this publication until his death, including as an editor after it was renamed School and Society following a 1928 merger. In January 1928, McAndrew was hired as editor of histories for The Century Company. From 1928 onwards, he also arranged the philosophical "Happy to Say" page of Nation's Schools and served as a regular public speaker. On October 5, 1928, several months after McAndrew left the Chicago superintendency, he was again appointed the chairman of the National Education Association's Department of Superintendence. On November 9, 1928, McAndrew was made a life member of the National Education Association.

McAndrew's health deteriorated during the last year of his life. On May 24, 1937, he entered White Plains General Hospital for a procedure and left for his residence in Mamaroneck, New York, on June 13, 1937. McAndrew died on June 28, 1937. There was no funeral service, but a memorial service was held. He was buried in his birthplace and hometown of Ypsilanti, Michigan.

== McAndrew's views on education and administration ==
McAndrew's approach to school administration was influenced by Frederick Winslow Taylor, the founder of the scientific management movement. McAndrew placed great emphasis on efficiency in the operation of schools. McAndrew also placed great importance in instilling social efficiency in students, stating that it was his belief that that education's role was, "to produce a human, social unit, trained in accordance with his capabilities to the nearest approach to complete social efficiency possible in the time allotted." In a 2015 article, Whet Moser of the Chicago magazine characterized this philosophy as in-line with the goals of the Commercial Club of Chicago, and his appointment as superintendent as having been illustrative of the club's influence on the city's schools. While leading Chicago's schools, McAndrew was a proponent of pursuing a more practical curriculum, with deemphasizing classical studies and the teaching of the Latin language. He also was a proponent of a more civics-focused curriculum. McAndrew also downplayed the importance of teaching abstract mathematics.

In a 1932 speech, McAndrew voiced objection to the recitation of the "Pledge of Allegiance" in schools, considering it a meaningless gesture. He also criticized the portrayal of figures such as George Washington in history texts used in books, complaining that these texts removed the more human personality flaws of subjects in order to further elevate their portrayal of heroism.

== Personal life ==
McAndrew was married in Dover, Maine, on June 28, 1894, to Susan Irvine Gurney. They had three children, daughters Helen (born 1895) and Mary (born 1897), and son John (born 1904). Their son, John McAndrew, would become the curator of New York City's Museum of Modern Art. Their daughter Mary married artist George Stonehill. She was involved in designing and painting her husband's murals.
