= Helen Walker McAndrew =

American physician (1825-1906)

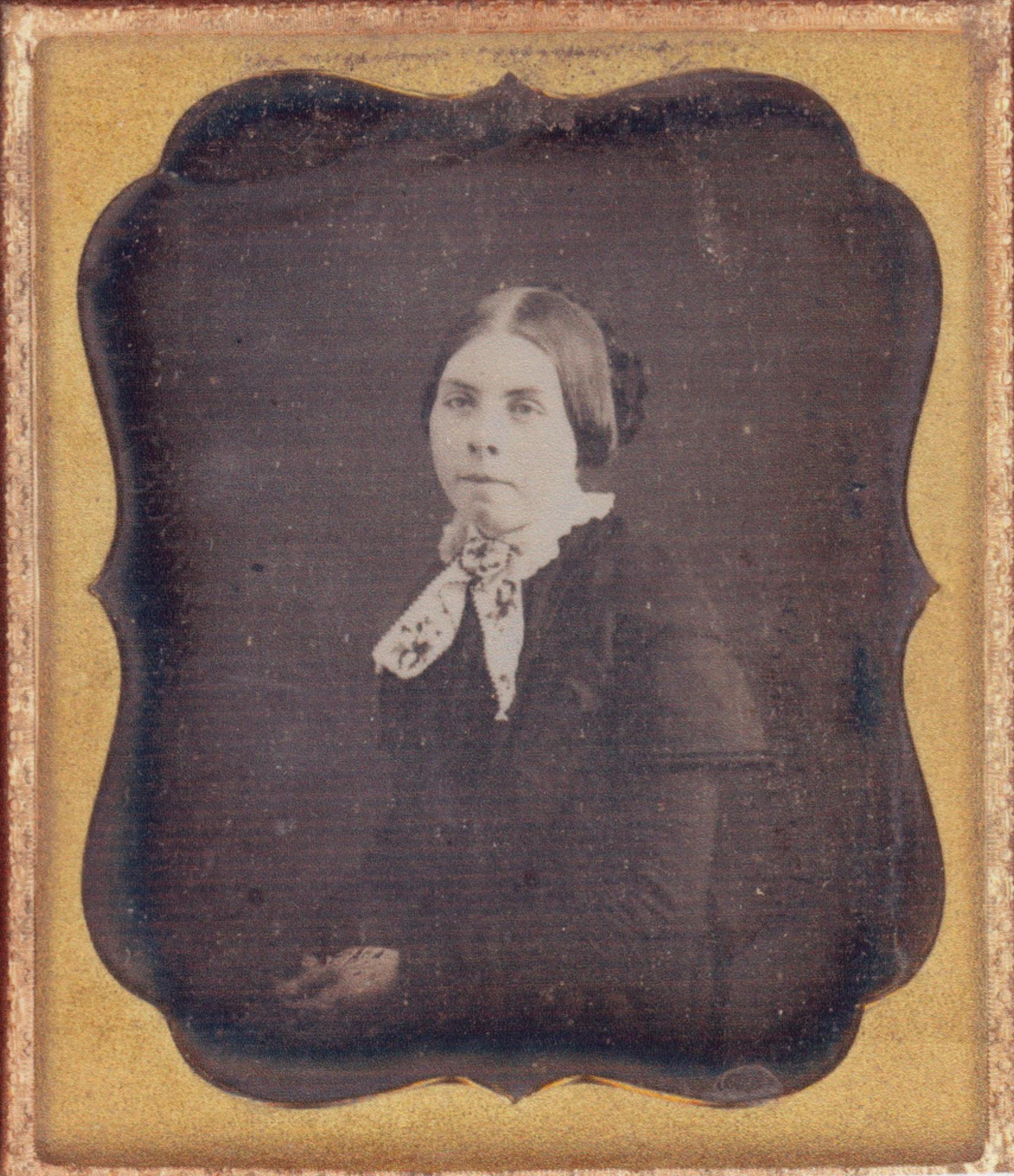
- Born: Helen Walker; February 6, 1825; Kirkintilloch, Scotland
- Died: October 26, 1906 (aged 81); Ypsilanti, Michigan
- Education: Trall Institute
- Occupation: physician
- Spouse: William McAndrew
- Children: 2 (including William)

Helen Walker McAndrew (6 February 1825 – 26 October 1906) was a Scottish-American doctor and the first documented female physician in Washtenaw County, Michigan. According to some sources, she was also the first female physician in the U.S. state of Michigan.

== Early life and education ==
Helen Walker was born in Kirkintilloch, Scotland, to Thomas Walker and Margaret Boyd. In 1849, she married William McAndrew in Glasgow. The couple emigrated from Scotland shortly after their marriage and arrived in Ypsilanti, Michigan, by way of New York. On June 24, 1852, McAndrew gave birth to their first-born son, Thomas. On August 20, 1863, she gave birth to another son, William Jr., who later became a noted educator.

== Career ==
=== Medical career ===
In Ypsilanti, McAndrew practiced as a self-trained nurse. When her son was still an infant, she decided to pursue medicine. No medical school west of New York would admit female students, so she traveled to New York City to attend the Trall Institute (New York Hydropathic and Physiological School), where she earned her M.D. in 1855.

When McAndrew returned to Ypsilanti, she was ostracized by the public she had previously nursed. She turned to practicing medicine for the marginalized poor and African Americans in her community. She was not accepted as a doctor by most members of her community until she saved the life of local State Senator Samuel Post's long-suffering wife, helping her where distinguished physicians from Ann Arbor failed. As a proponent of the water cure, she subsequently established a private practice with a sanatorium in her home and mineral baths in the nearby Huron River.

By numerous accounts, McAndrew was the first female licensed physician in the state of Michigan.

=== Activism ===
McAndrew was a leader of the push to admit women into the department of medicine at the University of Michigan, which succeeded in 1870. She, along with her husband, participated in the Underground Railroad, temperance societies and the suffrage movement in Washtenaw County. She worked with several prominent leaders on the suffrage movement including Elizabeth Cady Stanton and Susan B. Anthony.

=== Later life and death ===
McAndrew was widowed after the death of her husband on October 22, 1895. She died eleven years later on October 26, 1906, in Ypsilanti, Michigan.

In 1931, McAndrew was posthumously named Ypsilanti's "Most Distinguished Business and Professional Woman." She was inducted into the Michigan Women's Hall of Fame in 1994.
