= Bogan High School (Chicago) =

School in the United States

Location
- 3939 W. 79th Street; Chicago, Illinois 60652; United States; 41.7486°N 87.7208°W

Information
- School type: Public Secondary
- Motto: "Excellence Today, Success Tomorrow: Bogan Today, College Tomorrow."
- Opened: 1959
- School district: Chicago Public Schools
- CEEB code: 141387
- Principal: Alahrie A. Aziz–Sims
- Grades: 9–12
- Gender: Coed
- Enrollment: 671 (2023–2024)
- Campus type: Urban
- Colors: Orange; Black
- Athletics conference: Chicago Public League
- Mascot: Bengals
- Accreditation: North Central Association of Colleges and Schools
- Yearbook: The Medallion
- Website: boganhs.org

William J. Bogan Computer Technical High School (also known simply as Bogan High School) is a public four-year high school located in the Ashburn neighborhood on the southwest side of Chicago, Illinois, United States. Operated by Chicago Public Schools district, Bogan opened in 1959. The school is named for Chicago Public Schools Superintendent William J. Bogan. In 1999, the school began offering the International Baccalaureate Diploma Program; and becoming an International Baccalaureate World School in 2004.

== History ==
William J. Bogan was the superintendent of Chicago Public Schools during the Great Depression and believed that all should have an education regardless of income. The school opened in 1959 in a building designed by the architectural firm of Naess & Murphy. This was the same firm that had completed the Prudential Building in 1955. The building was designed in a "casual style" which included non-traditional building materials such as "aluminum window frames, concrete columns, and porcelain wall panels."

=== 1963 integration protests ===
In 1963, Bogan High School was the site of much protest against the integration of Chicago's public schools. The school was originally designated as a destination for students being bused to relieve overcrowding in majority African American schools. A group of parents met privately with Superintendent of Chicago Public Schools Benjamin Willis after which he "removed Bogan from a list of schools eligible to receive voluntary transfer applications." This act unleashed a storm of protest from civil rights activists and African American parents. At the same time, white opponents of desegregation became vocal supporters of Willis. Hundreds of parents from Bogan High School attended Board of Education meetings cheering the superintendent loudly and carrying signs that read "We Support Dr. Willis." By becoming responsive to their demands, Willis was able to stake out his own position as a champion of the white anti-integration activists that became his major supporters.

== Athletics ==
Bogan competes in the Chicago Public League (CPL) and is a member of the Illinois High School Association (IHSA). Bogan sport teams are nicknamed Bengals. The football team were Public league champions in 1991 and 1993. The boys' wrestling team were Public League champions in the 1993–94 season. The girls' volleyball team were public league champions in the 1984–85 and 1988–89 seasons.

== Notable alumni ==
- Barry Greenstein (1972) — Professional poker player
- Frank Hartley (1986) — NFL player
- Sean Lawler (1990) - former Chief of Protocol of the United States
- Belal Muhammad (2006) — former UFC Welterweight Champion
- E. J. Bibbs (2010) — NFL player
- Rashaun Agee (2019) — College basketball player
