= William J. Bogan =

American educator

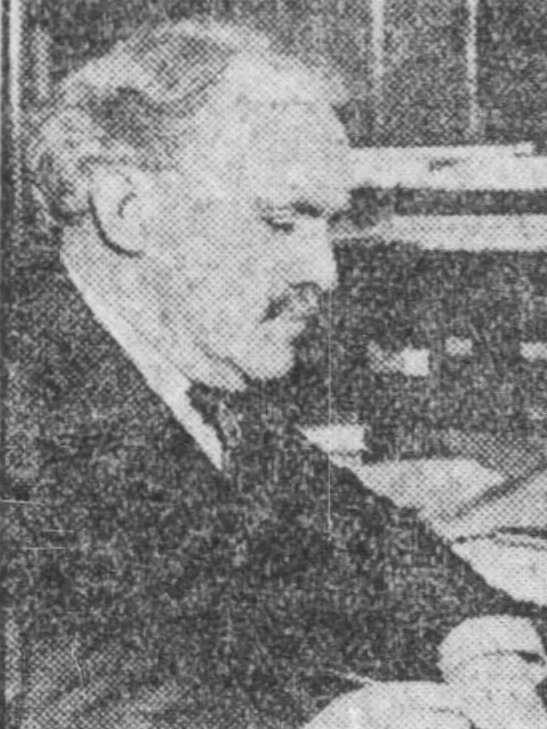
- Bogan in 1923

14th Superintendent of Chicago Public Schools
- In office August 29, 1927 – March 24, 1936 ("acting supt." until June 28, 1928)
- Preceded by: William McAndrew
- Succeeded by: William Johnson

Personal details
- Born: October 26, 1870 Mackinac Island, Michigan
- Died: March 24, 1936 (age 65)
- Spouse: Elizabeth
- Children: 3
- Education: University of Chicago
- Profession: Educator and administrator

William J. Bogan (October 26, 1870 – March 24, 1936) was an American educator and administrator who served as the superintendent of Chicago Public Schools from 1928 until his death in March 1936. During his time as superintendent, he was regarded as one of the most prominent educators in the United States.

== Early life ==
Bogan was born October 26, 1870, in Mackinac Island, Michigan. He grew up there, attending elementary school and high school there.

Bogan began his educational career by teaching at schools in Northern Michigan.

McAndrew received a bachelor's degree from the University of Chicago in 1909.

At one point, Bogan taught education at the University of California, Berkeley.

== Chicago Public Schools career ==
In 1893, Bogan began what would be a 43-year career with Chicago Public Schools. He started as a teacher at Washington Elementary School. In 1900, he became principal of the elementary school.

In 1905 Bogan was transferred to serve as the principal of Lane Technical High School. Bogan remained as this school's principal until 1924. The school was regarded as setting a national model during his tenure. Bogan became regarded as a leader in manual training as well as trades and industries education.

At one point, Bogan was additionally the superintendent of the Chicago Athenaeum, which was a hybrid business college and high school. He also additionally served as the principal of the Knights of Columbus Free Evening Schools, which provided education for former servicemen and servicewomen.

On April 18, 1924, Bogan was appointed to the position of first assistant superintendent of Chicago Public School, serving under Superintendent of Chicago Public Schools William McAndrew. Bogan had been originally the preferred candidate of multiple Chicago Board of Education members for the superindendency, before McAndrew was selected in a compromise. Bogan was assigned purview over public colleges, high schools, and night schools. He would also be tasked with helping to oversee the establishment of middle schools in the city. At the time he was appointed, the NCWC News Service (a Catholic news wire based in the United States) referred to Bogan, a Catholic, as, "one of the best known Catholic lay educators in the country."

Bogan beieived in placing a great emphasis on education for those who did not expect to go to college. Regarded as a leading authority on vocational education, Bogan served as president of both the National Society for Vocational Education and the Vocational Educational Association of the Middle West.

=== Superintendency ===
After McAndrew was suspended from his job as superintendent by the Chicago Board of Education on August 29, 1927, pending a trial, Bogan was made acting Superintendent.

On June 27, 1928, the Chicago Board of Education elected Bogan (who was still been serving as "acting" superintendent) as the new permanent superintendent of Chicago Public Schools.

During his superintendency, The New York Times would write that Bogan was, "recognized as one of the foremost educators in the country."

Bogan lead the Chicago Public Schools through many years of the Great Depression. In these years, the Board of Education put the schools under a "crucially low" budget. Bogan put in place a program which helped to find jobs for the nearly 2,000 elementary school teachers who were played. He begged the federal government to provide financial aid to Chicago Public Schools. Bogan also supported having religious instruction in the schools, remarking, "in this time of critical conditions, the churches and schools have a great responsibility to young people". At one point, Bogan threatened to cut teachers' wages.

In April 1932, Bogan ordered that all Chicago Public Schools students undergo periodic psychological evaluations, believing that this would increase safety and prevent crimes that could be attributed to mental conditions. This came in the wake of a thirteen-year-old student that had exhibited "criminal tendencies", George Rogalski, murdering Dorette Zietlow, a child who was less than three years old.

In October 1932, a powder bomb was set off in front Bogan's home. The bomb left little damage, was believed to have been set up by racketeers seeking to organize small businesses against the cafeterias that were being operated in the city's middle and high schools.

In 1935, with his health failing, much of Bogan's work as superintendent was delegated to his new assistant superintendent, William Johnson, whose appointment by the Chicago Board of Education Bogan had originally opposed.

== Death ==
Bogan died at the age of 65 on March 24, 1936.

== Legacy ==
Bogan High School in Chicago is named for him. The library at Lane Tech High School, where Bogan served as the longtime principal, was dedicated to him.

Chicago's Richard J. Daley College was formerly named " William J. Bogan Junior College".

== Personal life ==
Bogan and his wife, Elizabeth Shelley Bogan, had two daughters and a son. Bogan was Catholic.
