= Robert J. Havighurst =

American physicist and educator

Robert James Havighurst (Hurlock) (June 5, 1900 – January 31, 1991) was a chemist and physicist, educator, and expert on human development and aging. Havighurst worked and published well into his 80s. He died of Alzheimer's disease in January 1991 in Richmond, Indiana at the age of 90.

== Background and education ==
Havighurst was born in June 1900 in De Pere, Wisconsin. Both his father, Freeman Alfred Havighurst, and mother, Winifred Weter Havighurst, were educators at Lawrence University. He attended public schools in Wisconsin and Illinois. He obtained a B.A. from Ohio Wesleyan University in 1921, an M.A. from Ohio State University in 1922, and a Ph.D. in chemistry from Ohio State in 1924. He was a Fulbright Scholar at the University of Canterbury, New Zealand in 1953-1954 and at the University of Buenos Aires in 1961. He received an Honorary Degree Sc. from Adelphi University in 1962 and an Hon. L.L.D. from Ohio Wesleyan University in 1963.

== Career ==
He published a number of papers in journal of physics and chemistry about the structure of the atom in 1924. He went to Harvard University as a postdoctoral fellow, studying atomic structure and publishing papers in journals of physics and chemistry.

He decided to change careers in 1928, so he went into the field of experimental education. He became an assistant professor at the University of Wisconsin–Madison. In 1940, he became an education professor at the University of Chicago in the university's Committee on Human Development. He worked in the field of aging. Again, in the same year he was interested in international and comparative aspects of education. He wrote several books and published many papers. His best-known book called "Human Development and Education". He was named a member of the National Academy of Education in 1965. He retired in 1983.

He was inducted in the International Adult and Continuing Education Hall of Fame.

== Intellectual contributions ==
Havighurst's educational research did much to advance education in the United States. Educational theory before Havighurst was underdeveloped. Children learned by rote and little concern was given to how children developed. From 1948 to 1953 he developed his highly influential theory of human development and education. The crown jewel of his research was on developmental tasks. Havighurst tried to define the developmental stages on many levels.

Havighurst identified six major stages in human life covering birth to old age:

- Infancy & early childhood (Birth till 6 years old)
- Middle childhood (6–12 years old)
- Adolescence (13–18 years old)
- Early Adulthood (19–30 years old)
- Middle Age (30–60 years old)
- Later maturity (60 years old and over)

From there, Havighurst recognized that each human has three sources for developmental tasks. They are:

- Tasks that arise from physical maturation: Learning to walk, talk, control of bowel and urine, behaving in an acceptable manner to opposite sex, adjusting to menopause.
- Tasks that arise from personal values: Choosing an occupation, figuring out one's philosophical outlook.
- Tasks that have their source in the pressures of society: Learning to read, learning to be a responsible citizen.

The developmental tasks model that Havighurst developed was age dependent and all served pragmatic functions depending on their age.

== Educational work and civil rights ==
From 1967 through 1971, Havighurst directed the National Study of Indian Education, which was funded by the U.S. Office of Education. He involved Native Americans in planning the study as well as helping in field work and data analysis. The conclusions indicated that education for Native American youth across the United States varied widely according to numerous factors such as funding, location, curriculum, faculty, degree of isolation, and cultural differences. Recommendations included finding ways for Native Americans to have an increased voice in their education and the establishment of a National Commission on Indian Education.

In the late 1960s and 1970s, Havighurst focused his attention on the problems of urban education. He conducted a study of public high schools in the forty-five largest cities in the United States. The study examined: educational goals, school structure and organization, staff characteristics, curriculum, student activities, student activism, and school-community relations. Havighurst concluded that there was more and deeper segregation and separation of high school students of different socioeconomic and ethnic groups in 1969 to 1970 than there was ten or twenty years before. In 1977, at age seventy-seven, he coedited a book in which he developed a series of policies and practices for the improvement of big city schools based on his research.

== Quotes ==
"Family life is the source of the greatest human happiness. This happiness is the simplest and least costly kind, and it cannot be purchased with money. But it can be increased if we do two things: if we recognize and uphold the essential values of family life and if we get and keep control of the process of social change so as to make it give us what is needed to make family life perform its essential functions."

"A successful mother sets her children free and becomes free herself in the process."

"The two basic principle processes of education are knowing and valuing."

"The art of friendship has been little cultivated in our society."

"A developmental task is a task which is learned at a specific point and which makes achievement of succeeding tasks possible. When the timing is right, the ability to learn a particular task will be possible. This is referred to as a 'teachable moment.' It is important to keep in mind that unless the time is right, learning will not occur. Hence, it is important to repeat important points whenever possible so that when a student's teachable moment occurs, s/he can benefit from the knowledge."

== Selected works ==
- Warner, Lloyd W.; Havighurst, Robert J.; and Davis, Allison. Who Shall Be Educated? The Challenge of Unequal Opportunities. New York: Harper, 1944.
- Havighurst, Robert J.; and Neugarten, Bernice L. Father of the Man: How Your Child Gets His Personality. New York: Houghton, 1947.
- Havighurst, Robert J.; Stivers, Eugene; and Dehaan, Robert F. American Indian and White Children: A Sociopsychological Investigation. Chicago: University of Chicago Press, 1955.
- Gross, Irma; Havighurst, Robert J.; et al. (Eds.) A Survey of the Education of Gifted Children. Chicago: University of Chicago Press, 1955.
- Havighurst, Robert J.; and Dehann, Robert F. Potentialities of Women in the Middle Years. East Lansing: Michigan State University Press, 1957.
- Havighurst, Robert J.; et al. Educating Gifted Children. Chicago: University of Chicago Press, 1957.
- Havighurst, Robert J.; Neugarten, Bernice L.; and Falk, Jacqueline M. Growing up in River City. New York: Wiley, 1962.
- Havighurst, Robert J., (Ed.). Society and Education: A Book of Readings. New York: Allyn & Bacon, 1967.
- Havighurst, Robert J.; et al. Comparative Perspectives on Education. New York: Little, Brown, 1968.
- Havighurst, Robert J. Adjustment to Retirement: A Cross-national Study. Van Gorcum, 1969.
- Havighurst, Robert J. Developmental Tasks and Education. McKay, 1972.
- Havighurst, Robert J. To Live on this Earth: American Indian Education. New York: Doubleday, 1972.
