= William Hale Thompson 1927 mayoral campaign =

Political campaign in Chicago, Illinois, USA

- Campaign: 1927 Chicago mayoral election
- Candidate: William Hale Thompson
- Affiliation: Republican
- Headquarters: Sherman House Hotel
- Slogan: America First

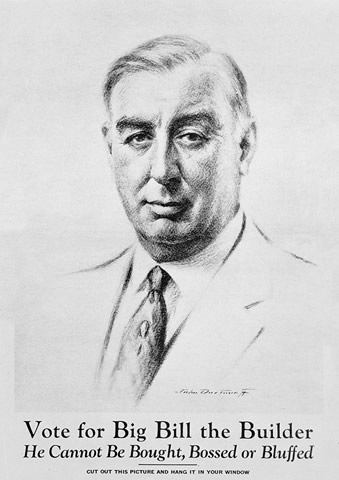
Thompson campaign poster

The William Hale Thompson 1927 mayoral campaign was the successful campaign of Republican William Hale Thompson for a third nonconsecutive term as mayor of Chicago in the 1927 Chicago mayoral election. The campaign saw him defeat incumbent Democrat William Emmett Dever, as well as a third-party effort by John Dill Robertson.

In his campaign, Thompson promised to end the enforcement of Prohibition and accused Dever of being complicit in a supposed scheme by the United Kingdom to try to retake control of the United States that involved William McAndrew (the superintendent of Chicago Public Schools). Other key focuses of his campaign included violent crime in the city and a promise to cease the city's enforcement of Prohibition. Thompson received support from a number of mobsters, including Al Capone.

== Background ==
Republican William Hale "Big Bill" Thompson, who had previously served as mayor of Chicago for two terms from 1915 to 1923, took advantage of the crime situation under his Democratic Party successor William Emmett Dever (attributed to Dever's strong enforcement of Prohibition causing increased competition among remaining bootleggers), and ran for a third nonconsecutive term, promising to end the enforcement of Prohibition.

Thompson's decision not to run for reelection in 1923 was due to scandals and indictments associated with his previous mayoral administration, which The New York Times observed gave Thompson a track record that, "was a little too rich for even the large tolerance of Cook County." Thompson claimed that he did not seek reelection because he had been "crucified" by his own allies.

Having declined a bid for reelection in 1923, Thompson had managed to stay in the public eye by constructing a yawl named the Big Bill with his head as the figurehead and spending $25,000 (Note: $360,000 in 2018. Thompson split the cost with allies William Lorimer and George F. Harding.) to take it on an expedition to Borneo to find a tree-climbing fish, all ostensibly as a publicity stunt for the Illinois Waterway. Thompson was immensely popular with the city's African-American community, having served as alderman of the 2nd ward, home of Chicago's largest black population, from 1900 to 1902. He also had enemies from his previous tenure, including the Chicago Tribune and the Chicago Daily News, and had started to wear out his welcome with former allies such as party boss Frederick Lundin.

On April 6, 1926, Thompson attracted national attention when he pulled the unusual stunt of debating with live rats representing Lundin and John Dill Robertson at a Frank L. Smith U.S. Senate campaign rally held at the city's Cort Theatre. Thompson was a supporter of Smith's candidacy against Lundin-backed incumbent William B. McKinley. Thompson's rodent show was a precursor of a mayoral campaign that would see him act far less restrained than he had acted in his previous two terms as mayor.

== Republican primary campaign ==
Thompson kicked off his candidacy on January 10, 1927 with a speech at a dance and reception jointly hosted by several Republican groups at the Trianon Ballroom.

Thompson faced Edward R. Litsinger, who was chairman of the Cook County Board of Review and was backed by reform-minded U.S. Senator Charles S. Deneen and Edward J. Brundage, (the latter of whom had split from his political ally Robert E. Crowe by supporting Litsinger). A much lesser second opponent on the ballot in the primary was former policeman Eugene McCaffrey. Originally, John Dill Robertson had planned to run in the Republican primary. However, Robertson dropped out in favor of Litsinger, per an agreement with Lundin. Robertson would mount an independent general election bid upon Litsinger's primary loss.

The Republican primary was marked by intense vitriol between the candidates. Thompson accused Robertson of messy eating, stating that "[With] eggs in his whiskers, soup on his vest, you'd think the doc got his education driving a garbage wagon." Robertson retaliated, accusing Thompson of corruption. Litsinger reiterated such accusations against Thompson and further accused Thompson of conspiring to get 50,000 Democratic votes. Both candidates asserted that they were guaranteed victory and accused the other of conspiring to steal the primary.

In an open letter, Thompson charged that Edward Brundage and Fred Lundin were suburbanites and were guilty of betraying their city roots. He also alleged that Litsinger, who had come from Back of the Yards, had abandoned his roots, writing "You moved to the Gold Coast. Are you thinking of joining the high brows of Lake Forest and becoming a resident of Lake County too?"

Thompson won the primary by a surprisingly large margin; to many, his victory itself was a surprise. He carried 49 of the city's 50 wards. The only ward he failed to carry was the 49th ward, which he lost by a margin of just over 100 votes. Thompson's margin of victory in the primary was record-breaking for a Chicago mayoral election. After Thompson's victory both partisans of Robertson and Democratic leaders claimed that Democratic voters for Thompson had propelled him to the Republican nomination, with the Democrats claiming that they did so in order to give Dever a weaker opponent in the general election. With Thompson's primary victory Robertson launched his independent campaign on February 23.

Thompson's run was supported by the political machine of Robert E. Crowe and Homer Galpin. After his victory, The New York Times observed that, just as he used to benefit under the machine Lundin's support, "he thrives just as well under the Crowe–Galpin machine". Thompson ran alongside a slate of candidates endorsed by himself, Crowe, and Galpin. The slate featured Patrick Sheridan Smith for Chicago city clerk and Charles S. Peterson for Chicago city treasurer. Both won the Republican primaries for their office, defeating opponents that Brundage and Deneen had jointly backed.

== General election campaign ==
Three days before election, Owen L. Scott of South Bend Tribune observed that, "[Thompson] is waging his wild campaign for mayor on the basis of 'bombast and prejudice'" making use of epithets and pejoratives such as, "left-handed Irishmen, snakes, Swedes, beer runners, polecats, wart hogs, saps, rats, skunks, liars, damn liars, Britishers, and hirelings of King George." While Thompson engaged in bitter rhetoric attacking Dever, Dever largely refused to engage in Thompson's style of rhetoric. This was with exception, as Dever did once comment in an interview with the Chicago Daily News that, "Thompson's trouble is mental". However, largely, Dever instead promised to engage in a debate of substantive issues, partaking only in a "decent, friendly discussion without malice or sensationalism". Dever responded to Thompson's many accusations by declaring them "blarney" which he had no intention of dignifying, and noting that Thompson's comments on international affairs were irrelevant to the duties and powers of the mayoralty. Dever's campaign characterized Thompson as, "a political pyromaniac".

=== Endorsements ===
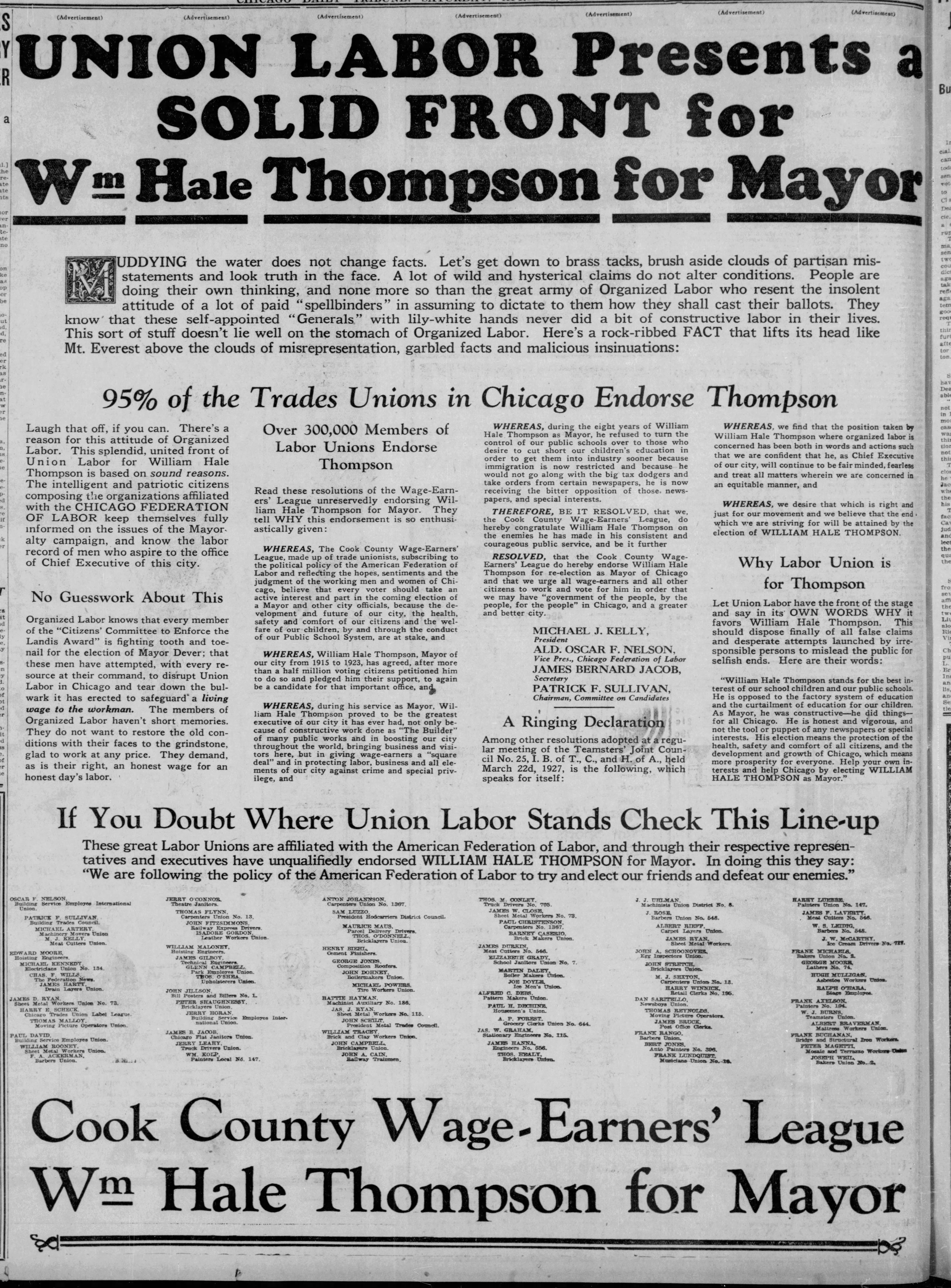
Cook County Wage-Earner's League newspaper advertisement claiming that "95% of the Trades Unions in Chicago Endorse Thompson"

Deneen backed Thompson after his primary defeat. The Chicago Federation of Labor endorsed Thompson. Despite having been a foe of Thompson during his first mayoralty, Margaret Haley, president of the Chicago Federation of Teachers, personally endorsed him due to Thompson's opposition of William McAndrew, the superintendent of Chicago Public Schools. The Cook County Wage-Earners' League ran an advertisement for Thompson in the Chicago Tribune, in which it claimed that 95 percent of the trades unions in Chicago endorsed him. However, in actuality, labor support was divided between the two major party candidates. While the Cook County Wage Earners, headed by Chicago Federation of Labor vice-president Oscar F. Nelson, backed Thompson, a notable group of labor officials backed Dever. Thompson was backed by two Hearst-owned newspapers, as well as the African-American Daily Defender and L'Italia, the city's second-best selling Italian newspaper. Martin Walsh, who had run against Dever in the Democratic primary, served as a stump speaker for Thompson. Thompson was also endorsed by Illinois Attorney General Oscar E. Carlstrom, Illinois Secretary of State Louis Lincoln Emmerson, Illinois Lieutenant Governor Fred E. Sterling, Cook County Sheriff Charles E. Graydon, Cook County Coroner Oscar Wolff, and Chicago Postmaster (and 1923 Republican mayoral nominee) Arthur C. Lueder. Thompson also received a last-minute endorsement from Illinois Governor Len Small.

Thompson actively courted support from criminal racketeers and received campaign donations from a number of them, including Al Capone (who gave a $260,000 contribution to Thompson's campaign). Thompson received the endorsement of Capone after promising lax enforcement of Prohibition. It was public knowledge that Capone was supporting Thompson's campaign effort, collecting campaign contributions from those who sold his beer. Capone donated between $100,000 (Note: $1.4 million in 2018) and $500,000 (Note: $7.2 million in 2018) to Thompson's campaign. Other crime figures backing Thompson included Jack Zuta, who gave $50,000 (Note: $720,000 in 2018) to his campaign, Timothy D. Murphy, and Vincent Drucci. During the election campaign, Democrats successfully appealed for a special grand jury to investigate gang activities related to supporting Thomposon's candidacy.

=== "America First" and allegations levied by Thompson of a British conspiracy ===
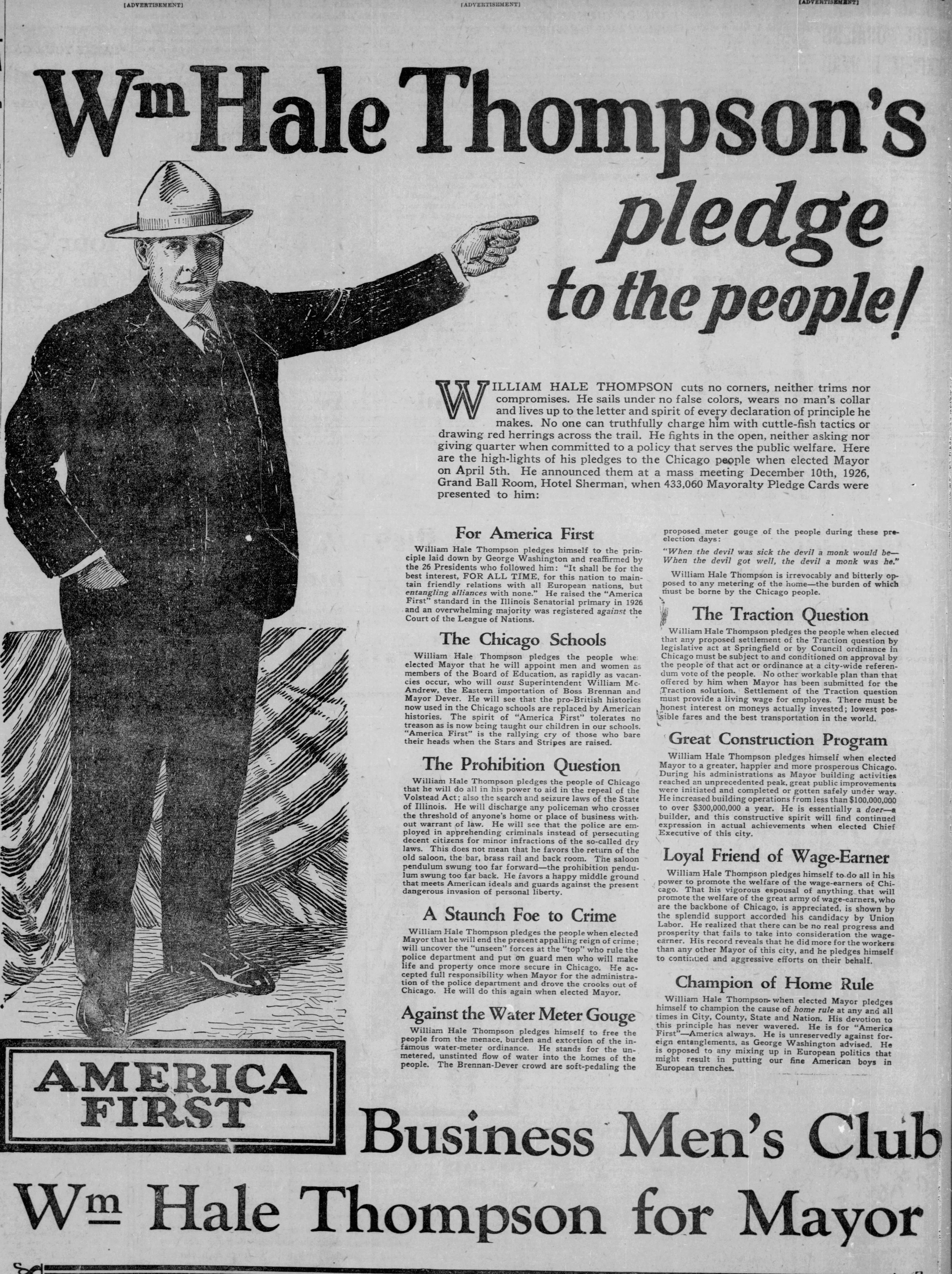
Newspaper advertisement in support of Thompson's campaign baring his "America First" slogan

Thompson accused Dever of treason. Using the slogan "America First", he alleged that Superintendent of Chicago Public Schools William McAndrew was a British agent sent by King George as part of a grand conspiracy to manipulate the minds of American children and set the groundwork for the United Kingdom to repossess the United States; he accused the "left-handed Irishman" Dever of being part of the plot. Thompson based these claims on McAndrew being critical of such artworks as Archibald Willard's The Spirit of '76 and allowing the use in schools of textbooks which Thompson alleged were unpatriotic and full of, "treason tainted histories". This came amid a 1920s wave of anglophobic criticisms in the United States of textbooks being "pro-British" and "unamerican". Thompson's attacks on McAndrew were a significant factor in his successful campaign.

While it is not clear why Thompson chose to single-out McAndrew for such attacks, in a 1980 journal article, Dennis F. Thompson speculated that Thompson might have chosen McAndrew as an enemy, in part, due to McAndrew being a force against political patronage in schools, as well as due to McAndrew's ties to Dever. Another aspect that Dennis F. Thompson speculated may have been a factor was McAndrews unpopularity with teachers. Dennis F. Thompson argued that there is strong evidence that teachers, indeed, very actively backed Thompson's candidacy in hopes of ousting McAndrew. Additionally, Thompson had, in the past, already appealed to the city's German and Irish populations by positioning himself as anti-British. Chicago was home to many ethnic neighborhoods where there was strong resentment of the British royal family, a feeling exacerbated in many households by World War I. The anti–British appeal of Thompson's attacks on McAndrew were perhaps key in fueling the success of McAndrew's 1927 campaign. A 1968 report by Robert J. Havighurst expressed the belief that Thompson was taking advantage of the situation created by McAndrew's combative relationship with teachers unions and the Chicago Federation of Labor. In addition, Thompson effectively made a liability for Dever what The New York Times considered to be his mayoralty's greatest success. The New York Times, on March 28, 1927, wrote,

No work of Mayor Dever's Administration has been more praiseworthy than the improvement and extension of the public school system, the seat of enormous mismanagement and inefficiency under Thompsonism."

Thompson was not a lone actor in publicly painting McAndrew as unpatriotic. In 1926, the "Citizens' Committee on School Histories", a group led by far-right United States Congressman John J. Gorman, published a document that denounced three United States history textbooks that were in use in Chicago Public Schools as pro-British, and argued that heroes of other nationalities had been overlooked by the books in numerous instances. While Mayor Dever brought this document to McAndrew's attention, McAndrew did not give it any concern. In 1927, Thompson would add the report published by this group to his campaign literature. Additionally, at the City Council's first meeting after McAndrew made a remark criticizing Archibald Willard's The Spirit of '76 for not being an accurate picture of war, Alderman John Coughlin denounced McAndrew's comments as being traitorous, and proposed an ordinance to denounce McAndrew. However, Alderman William D. Meyering, a decorated veteran of World War I, stood up and stated that he actually agreed with McAndrew's statement, which served to quash the momentum of Coughlin's ordinance.

McAndrew himself did not stay neutral in the mayoral race. In an unprecedented move for a Chicago school superintendent, he signed a letter urging support for Dever's campaign. He printed copies of this letter in school print shops and had the Women's City Club distribute them to each of the school system's school principals. He also made an appearance wearing Dever campaign apparel at a public dinner for Dever hosted by the Women's City Club.

Thompson ran with an education platform pledging to purge the school's textbooks of British propaganda, which, he alleged, disregarded, "Polish, German, Irish, and other heroes" of the American revolution, and demeaned George Washington. Thompson pledged to, "put the picture of George Washington back in the school books". He declared that when he left office and Dever became mayor, "Washington fell out and the King of England fell in."

Thompson obsessed over a college textbook which used the term "rebel" to describe Washington. Thompson accused McAndrew of conspiring with the University of Chicago's Charles Hubbard Judd and Charles Edward Merriam to, "destroy the love of America in the hearts of children by encouraging teachers to attend special classes at 'Chicago University' at which the text was used which pictured George Washington as a rebel and a great disloyalist."

Among the textbooks that Thompson criticized as unpatriotic were A History of the United States by Willian Fiske Gordy, Our United States by William Backus Guitteau, and The Silent Reader by Albert Lindsay Lewis and William D. Rowland. Former president of the Chicago Board of Education Charles Moderwell, who had served during the earlier part of Dever's mayoralty, argued that textbooks which Thompson attacked as being unpatriotic had actually been approved by the school board Thompson had appointed during his previous mayoralty. Indeed, the school's history textbooks had not been chosen by McAndrew but had rather been chosen by his predecessor.

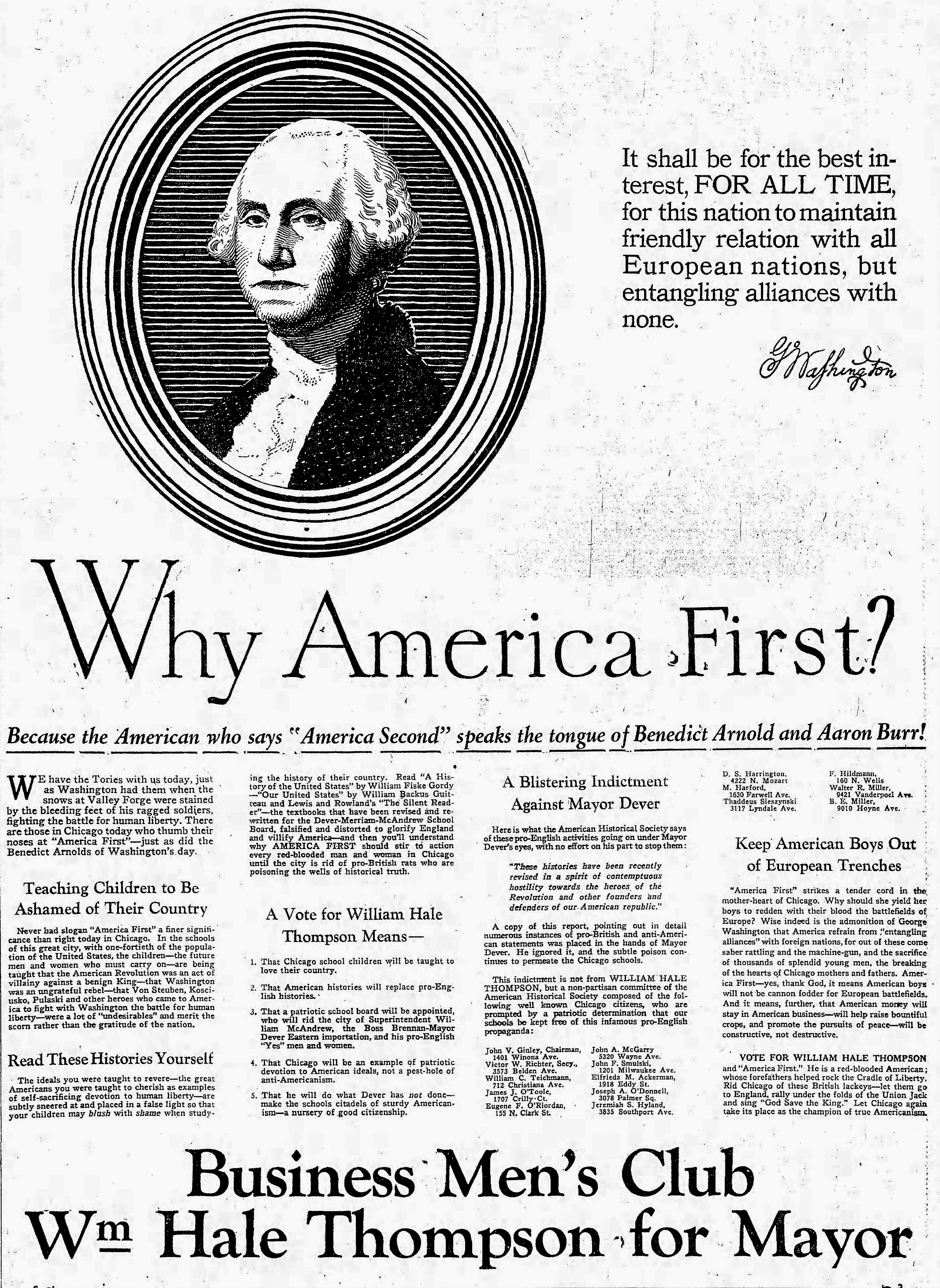
Full-page newspaper advertisement in support of Thompson baring language attacking Superintendent McAndrew (including listing sixteen historians who agreed with Thompson's criticism of school textbooks). This full-page ad was run March 30, 1927

Thompson ran full-page newspaper advertisements on March 30, 1927 which listed sixteen German American, Irish American, and Polish American historians belonging to the American Historical Society as co-signing his attack on Mayor Dever for the content of school books in the city.

Thompson pledged to get William McAndrew fired from his post as superintendent of Chicago Public Schools. Thompson boasted of his role in ousting then-school superintendent Charles Ernest Chadsey during his previous tenure as mayor, claiming now that Chadsey had also been part of a pro-British conspiracy, declaring, "I threw out Chadsey, who was imported here by friends of British propaganda, and I'll throw out McAndrews [sic]". Thompson made the campaign promise of appointing, "a patriotic school board...who will rid the city of Superintendent McAndrew," and "his pro-English 'yes' men and women". He faulted Dever and Democratic political boss George E. Brennan as responsible for McAndrew's hiring.

Defending himself against criticism of the indictment of school board members during his mayoralty, Thompson declared,

Of course none of Mayor Dever's school board were indicted. The King of England wouldn't let 'em be indicted. You take a chance on being punished when you're 100 percent American.

Thompson's anti–British crusade went beyond the schools, as he also complained of there being a large number of pro-British books populating the city's libraries, and urged the residents to pillage the libraries and burn such books. Thompson also accused Dever of removing a portrait of George Washington from the mayor's office, an accusation which Dever denied. In his campaign speeches, Thompson also attacked Homer Davis, the director of the school district's Bureau of Building Survey, as "the foreigner Superintendent McAndrew brought here from Arizona to tell us where to put our schools." Thompson threatened that if King George ever came to Chicago, he would punch the king in the "snoot". Thompson insinuated that he might see to it that Dever would be sent to prison.

Full-page newspaper advertisement promoting the candidacies of Thompson and his "America First" Republican slate

Thompson pledged that his "America First" slate would see such strong victories that, "the king of England will find out for the first time he is damned unpopular". Thompson's campaign anthem was titled "America First, Last and Always". Thompson promised to lend support to the creation of so-called "America First Associations" across the United States. Jeff Nichols of the Chicago Reader would retrospectively observe in 2017 of Thompson's "America First" movement that,

"America First opposed immigration, but ironically it suggested the greatest threat came from Thompson's own tribe: WASPs. America First was a way to strike back at elites—the reformers who endlessly lectured white ethnic Chicagoans to be more American, the fanatics who had criminalized beer, the professors and newspapermen who had promised that the sacrifices of the Great War would bring about a just society."

=== Anti-prohibition stance ===
Taking a vehemently anti-Phrohibition stance, Thompson declared himself to be, "wetter than the middle of the Atlantic Ocean," and promised not only to permit every speakeasy Dever had closed to reopen, but to add a further 10,000 additional new speakeasies to the city. He also promised to fire any police officers that interfered with drinking. Thompson pledged, if elected, to, "immediately use all my power to help repeal the Volstead Act, the search and seizure act, and fire every cop who attempts to enter your homes in a search for still or for liquor." Thompson's campaign headquarters served bootleg alcohol, to help lend credibility to his stance.

Thompson alleged that city officials were making commission from sales at illegal breweries, and that city's police were acting to facilitate this.

=== Racial and ethnic matters ===
Thompson, seeking the African-American vote, seized on School Superintendent William McAndrew's alleged failure in 1926 to act upon complaints by The Chicago Defender that there were anti-black stereotypes in civics text books, written by University of Chicago, that were used in the city's high schools. After these complaints were made, the school board, not McAndrew, had been the ones who acted to request the publisher change the passages in question.

Thompson's camp pointed to a number of police raids that took place in Black areas of the city near the day of the election in their arguments for African Americans to vote for Thompson, blaming Dever's administration for these. Thompson spoke of the possibility of race riots in the city's "Black Belt", and pledged to commit a year of his life to jailing Dever if such rioting occurred.

Thompson denounced Dever as that "left-handed Irishman", and aroused anti-Catholic prejudice against Dever.

Campaigning for German votes, Thompson stated:

They called me pro-German during the war because I kept my oath to protect the people. If you make a mistake and vote for some one who doesn't care for you or his oath to God, you'll have to pay the penalty. If I'm elected mayor, I'll build the largest town hall in the world where your German choruses of 25,000 voices can sing as they never have before.

=== Crime ===
Despite directly courting support from racketeers, Thompson seized on the city's crime problems to attack Dever. He ran a large advertisement in the Chicago Tribune which declared, "The city is overrun with morons and other vicious elements. The papers teem with accounts of murders and other horrible lawlessness. Thompson pledges himself to change these conditions and make life and property once again secure in Chicago." Thompson's campaign also claimed that crime in the city had dramatically driven up insurance rates, claiming that, "Insurance rates have increased 25 to 100 per cent under the Dever police administration."

=== Structural safety of school buildings ===
Thompson alleged that new Chicago Public Schools buildings that had been constructed were unsafe, with unsound structural support arches. He claimed Dever was scared to close these hazardous schools, out of fear that it would be discovered that there was graft among the builders, and that Dever, "has his men working nights trying to bolster up these arches". Thompson declared, "I pray to God that those arches may hold until April 5. Because, after that, if I am elected, I will close those schools until they are made safe." Thompson declared the buildings to be possible, "death traps".

In an effort to squash these allegations, Dever, Chicago Board of Education officials, and an independent firm of engineers gave statements on March 28, 1927 declaring the allegations to be an unfounded falsehood. Chicago Board of Education architect John C. Christensen claimed that the only morsel of truth was that a minor employee had, previously, found some faults in concrete of nine buildings, but Christensen asserted that the needed structural reinforcement had already promptly been added. Arthur R. Lord of the Lord & Hemingway engineering firm alleged that photos used by Thompson as evidence of damaged concrete supports had actually been of concrete damaged by photographers from Thompson's own team in an effort to frame a false narrative.

=== Other campaign matters ===
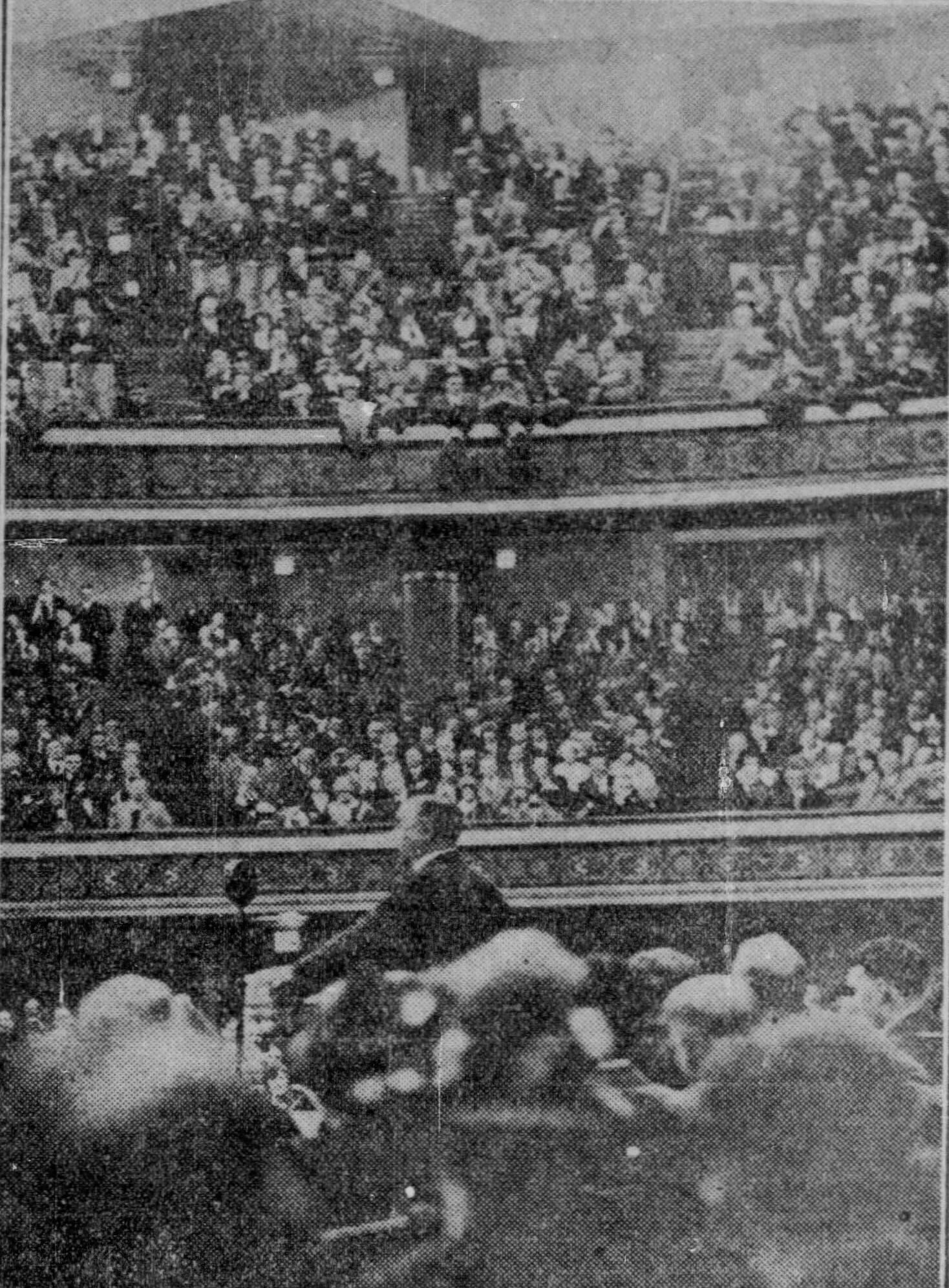
Thompson campaigns before a crowd at the Medinah Temple on the evening of April 2, 1927

Thompson pledged to repeal the city's water meter ordinance, and remove water meters from residences. He pledged that, "when Thompson is mayor, you'll have all the water you want at a nominal price". After Democratic chief Brennan said that "All the hoodlums are for Thompson", Thompson cited those words to persuade his supporters that the Democrats were elitist and looked down upon them.

In addition to attacking Superintendent McAndrew with allegations of British propaganda, Thompson also characterized McAndrew as an autocratic individual focused on social efficiency. He used this characterization to appeal to disapproval towards McAndrew by teachers, organized labor, and working class parents.

National and international political matters without direct bearing on the role of the mayor were inserted into the campaign. Deneen, for instance, argued, in support of Thompson, that a reelected Dever would partner with George E. Brennan to aid the Democratic Party against the Republican Party in the 1928 national election. In his campaign, Thompson criticized the League of Nations and the World Court. Thompson also demanded for there to be, "no future draft". Thompson's decision to insert such matters into a mayoral campaign was not a first for him, he had focused his 1919 reelection campaign on national matters as opposed to local issues.

Near the end of the campaign, Cook County State's Attorney Robert E. Crowe was charged in a petition as having illegally used his office to support Thompson's candidacy.

On March 29, 1927, Thompson's team of lawyers (led by Joseph P. Savage) filed before the Chicago Board of Election Commissioners thousands of affidavits alleging illegal voter registrations. Chicago City Attorney Samuel Pincus objected to these affidavits. Thousands of separate affidavits had been filed that day by Democrats, largely of voter registrations in the city's "Black Belt" (with Dever's camp alleging, with these affidavits, that thousands of Black voters had been registered to addresses that were actually vacant homes, vacant lots, barber shops, pool rooms, and gas stations). In total, 15,000 were filed that day.

=== Outcome ===
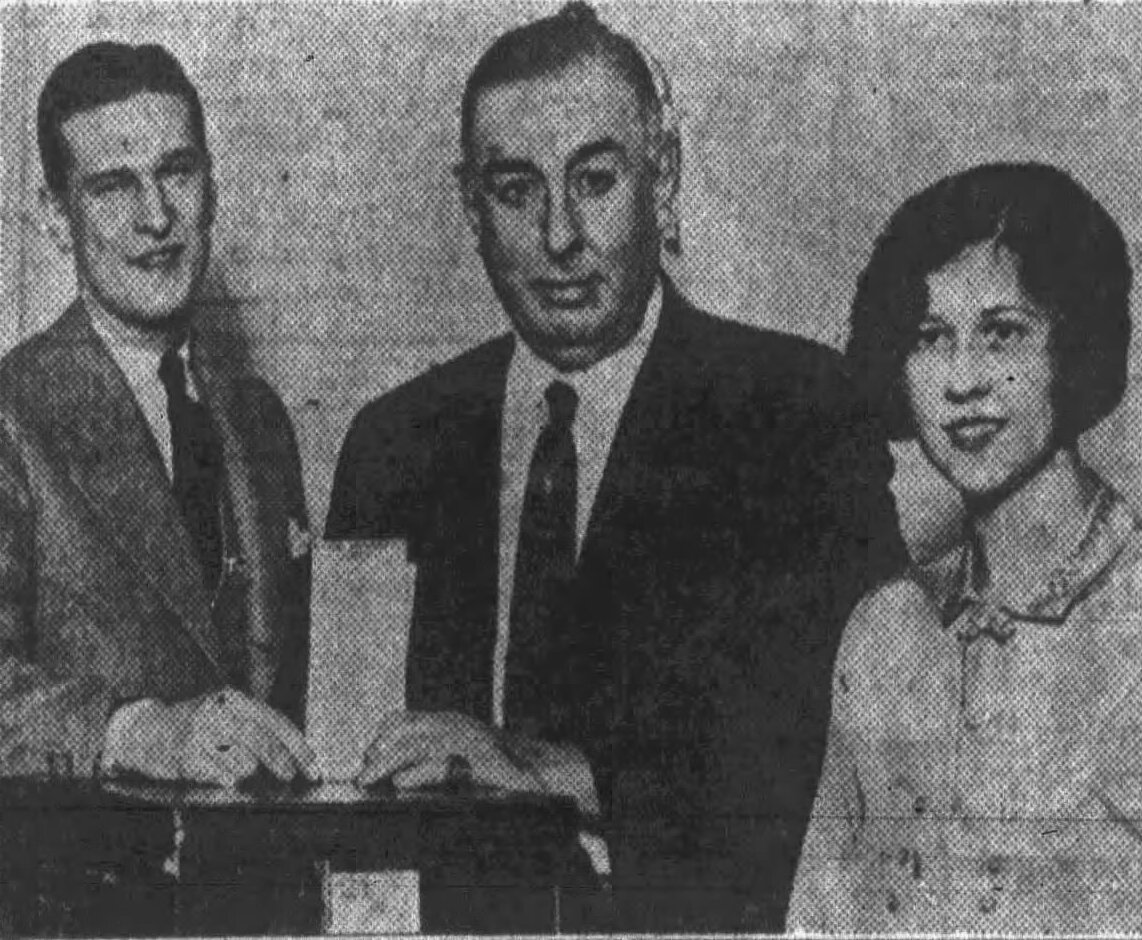
Thompson (center) casts his own ballot

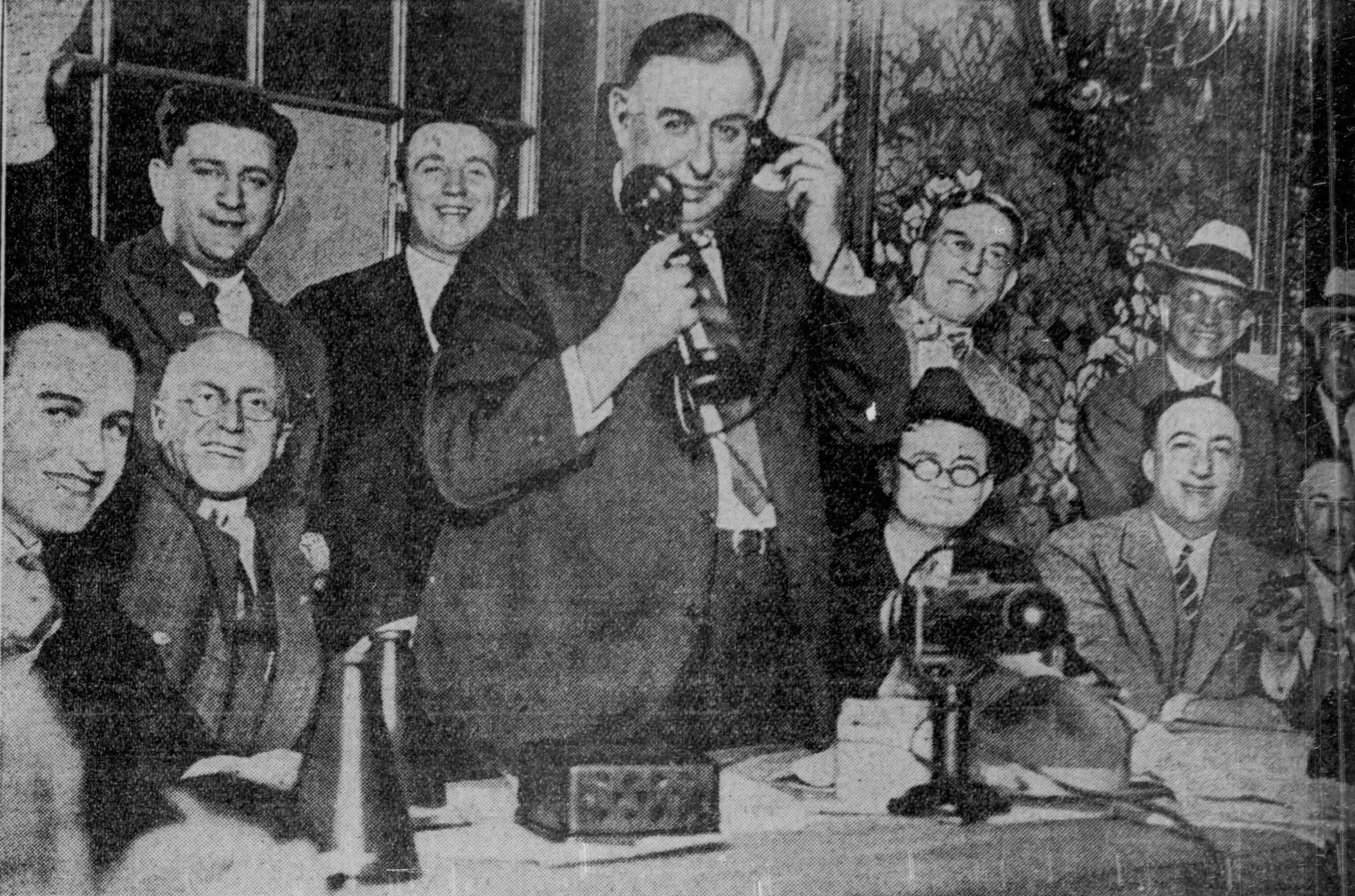
Thompson making a celebratory phone call to his wife after the election returns indicated that he had won the election

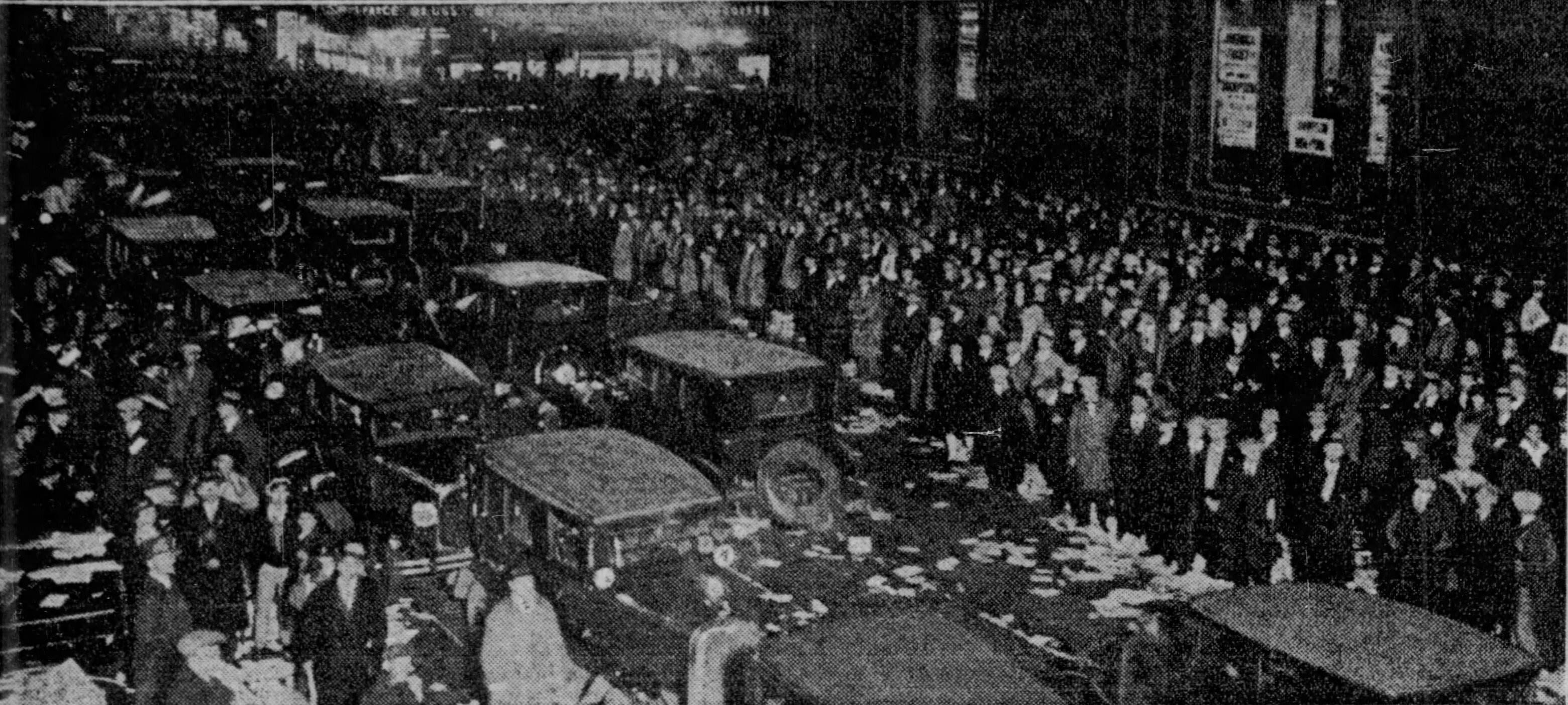
Crowd of Thompson supporters gather in celebration outside of the Sherman House Hotel after Thompson's victory

Thompson won the election with more than 51.58 percent of votes cast (with Dever receiving 43.28%, and Robertson receiving 5.14%), Thompson carried 28 of the city's 50 wards. Dever's campaign ultimately failed to achieve momentum; Thompson had dominated the discourse early on and left Dever's supporters struggling to react to Thompson's campaign and ultimately failing to fully promote Dever's own message. Additionally, Thompson's running mates on his Republican "America First" slate, Patrick Sheridan Smith and Carles S. Peterson, each won their respective elections for Chicago city clerk and Chicago city treasurer.

Thompson's campaign held their election night victory party in the Louis XIV Ballroom of the Sherman House Hotel. Both Thompson and Dever's campaign headquarters had been located in the Sherman House Hotel, with Thompson's headquarters being located one floor above Dever's. Many Thompson supporters celebrated in the streets of the city's downtown. Many Thompson supporters celebratorily drove around the city carrying brooms. In his victory statement, Thompson reafirmed his support for his America First platform, and pledged to use his office to improve the city of Chicago's port, declaring, "I pledge my vote and support for America First, a greater Chicago, and a deep waterway." Thompson also declared the he would, "do away with the breadline by stimulating business," and also promised to oust Superintendent McAndrew. Thompson's victory speech emphasized the anti-British themes of his campaign, declaring,

My elections means that Chicago will be an example of patriotic devotion to American ideals—not a pesthole of anti-American-isms. My election, thank God, means that our boys will not be cannon fodder for Europe's battlefields. We will send these lackeys back to England where they can sing, "God Save the King."

== Analysis ==
Many experts concluded that Thompson had won because of his skilled campaigning, providing entertainment while Dever called for virtue. Elmer Davis of Harper's Magazine mused that the mystery was not in Dever losing, but rather was in Dever still managing to receive 430,000 votes. George Schottenhamel, writing in 1952 for the Journal of the Illinois State Historical Society, argued that Dever "would have been easy opposition for any candidate" running "on a campaign of 'Dever and Decency' despite four years of rampant crime in Chicago". The New York Daily News credited opposition to Dever's enforcement of Prohibition and Thompson's pledge to cease such enforcement as key to Thompson's victory, expressing hope that it would warn leaders of other large city's not to enforce "the tyrannous nonsense that is prohibition." However, the newspaper also decried the result as a "victory of a political haymaker over a sincere man," calling Dever "an earnest and an honest mayor as far as can be discerned," and characterizing Thompson as holding a political record "of administrative rottenness surpassed only by certain Tammany pirates of fifty years ago."

Thompson's victory damaged Chicago's reputation nationally. Will Rogers remarked that "They was trying to beat Bill [Thompson] with the Better Element vote. The trouble with Chicago is that there ain't much Better Element." (Note: Rogers is sometimes erroneously said to have written this in response to Thompson's 1915 victory.) The St. Louis Star declared that "Chicago is still a good deal of a Wild West town, where a soapbox showman extracting white rabbits from a gentleman's plug hat still gets a better hearing than a man in a sober suit talking business." The campaign was such that philosopher Will Durant openly wondered whether democracy was dead.

Thompson and his 1927 campaign have both been analyzed by some modern writers as precursors to the political career of Donald Trump and Trumpism.

== Aftermath ==
In his inaugural address, Thompson reiterated his pledge to oust Superintendent McAndrew. In August 1927, the Chicago Board of Education, now under Thompson's influence after he appointed a number new members, voted to charge McAndrew with insubordination and unpatriotic “conduct incompatible and inconsistent with, and in direct violation" of his duties, suspending him pending an administrative hearing held by the board. The administrative hearing would last months, and the Chicago Board of Education would find McAndrew guilty. The Superior Court of Cook County would later void this decision.
