= 1924 Cicero, Illinois, municipal elections =

- April 1, 1924

The 1924 Cicero, Illinois, municipal elections were elections held in 1924 to select municipal officers in Cicero, Illinois. The elections were notable for the gang-related violence which took place.

== Background ==
The 1924 Cicero municipal elections were of special interest to the Chicago Outfit, as they sought to protect their base of operations both from reformist politicians and from rival gangs.

Incumbent Republican mayor Joseph Z. Klenha and his administration were corrupt, and, before 1924, had run Cicero with little political opposition. Klenha had a bipartisan machine that had run Cicero for three consecutive terms. However, in 1924, the Democratic Party decided it would mount a serious challenge to Klenha in Cicero and run its own slate of candidates.

In 1923 Chicago elected reformist William Emmett Dever as mayor. This led mobsters Johnny Torrio and Al Capone to move the Chicago Outfit's base outside of Chicago's city limits and into the suburban city of Cicero. The gang solidified their power over the suburb's political structure by ousting Republican political boss Eddie Vogel from power.

The Chicago Outfit controlled the rum-running operation supplying Cicero's saloons. Rival gangs, seeking to usurp the Chicago Outfit's local Cicero monopoly, aligned themselves with the Democrats.

== Violence and gang activity on the day of the primary ==
The Chicago Tribune declared that the elections were, "marked by shootings, stabbings, kidnappings, and other outlawry unsurpassed in any previous Cook County political contest."

The Chicago Outfit obliged to a request from Klenha for assistance in securing his reelection. In return for securing his reelection, they would be granted an effective immunity from the law in Cicero. Al Capone brought in more than 200 men from his gang and its allies. He also brought in his own brothers Frank Capone and Ralph Capone, and his cousin Charles Fischetti.

On March 31, the eve of the election, the first person struck was Democratic nominee for town clerk William K. Pflaum, whose campaign offices were ransacked. Pflaum had his face beaten and his wife was thrown against a wall. To protect the Chicago Outfit's political control of Cicero, the Chicago Outfit unleashed a wave of terror on Cicero on the day of the April 1 election. They sent South Side gang members to the polling booths with submachine guns and sawed-off shotguns to make sure that local residents "voted right". Uncooperative voters were assaulted and blocked from voting. Cooperative voters were allowed by them to illegally cast multiple ballots. Frank Capone led an attack on an opponent's campaign headquarters, ransacking his office and assaulting several campaign workers. An election official named Joseph Price was beaten, then held gagged and bound.

Rudolph Hurt, the Democratic challenger for mayor, saw his campaign headquarters shot-up. The Democratic challenger for City Clerk was pistol-whipped in front of his wife, his children, and many supporters.

Cars filled with gunmen roamed the town's streets. A Cicero police officer was disarmed and terribly battered. Some voters were shot or cut to death. Polling places were raided and ballots were forcibly ripped from the hands of voters by thugs.

Campaigners for both parties were beaten by roaming groups of "sluggers" in the streets. A Democratic worker named Stanley Stenkievitch was kidnapped, blindfolded, and brought to a Chicago basement where he was held as a captive until after the Cicero polls closed. Up to twenty men were similarly kidnapped, driven to a basement of a plumbing store in Chicago and chained to pipes and posts. One Democratic campaign worker named Michael Gavin was shot in both legs and detained with eight other Democratic campaign workers in the basement of a mob-owned hotel in Chicago, only to be released when Election Day was over.

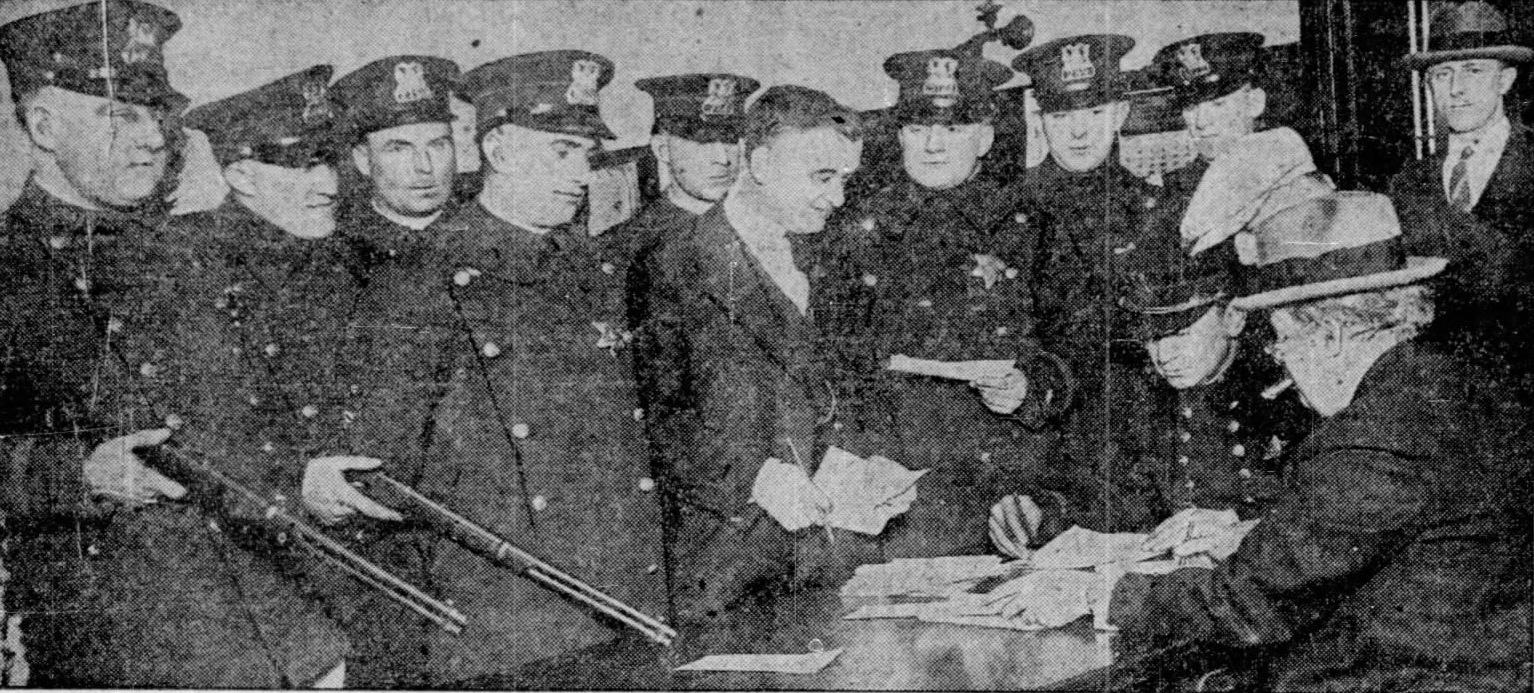
Chicago police being deputized and issued riot guns

By the afternoon, election officials had sent out requests for help bringing order to Cicero. A Cook County judge named Edmund K. Jarecki deputized seventy Chicago police officers, five squads from the detective's bureau, and nine squads of motorized police to bring order to Cicero.

At one point Frank Capone, Al Capone, Dave Hedlin, and Charles Fischetti were spotted by a squad car carrying uniformed police and detectives who leapt out of their car with their firearms drawn. Frank Capone began firing at them, and in the ensuing gunfight they shot and killed Frank Capone in the street. Hedlin was wounded, Fischetti fled and later surrendered, while Al Capone escaped.

== Mayoral election ==
1924 Cicero mayoral election
- April 1, 1924

Nominee	Joseph Z. Klenha	Rudolph Hurt
Party	Republican	Democratic
Popular vote	7,878	6,993
Percentage	52.99%	47.02%
Mayor before election
Joseph Z. Klenha
Republican
Elected mayor
Joseph Z. Klenha
Republican

Incumbent town president (mayor) Klenha was the Chicago Outfit's favored candidate. Klenha was challenged by Democrat Rudolph Hurt. Klenha won reelection.

Mayoral election
Party	Candidate	Votes	%
Republican	Joseph Z. Klenha (incumbent)	7,878	52.99
Democratic	Rudolph Hurt	6,993	47.02
Total votes		14,871	100

== Clerk election ==
1924 Cicero clerk election
- April 1, 1924

Nominee	Max Haucek	Walker K. Pflaum
Party	Republican	Democratic
Popular vote	7,880	6,916
Percentage	52.26%	46.74
Clerk before election
Max Haucek
Republican
Elected Clerk
Max Haucek
Republican

Clerk
Party	Candidate	Votes	%
Republican	Max Haucek (incumbent)	7,880	52.26
Democratic	Walker K. Pflaum	6,916	46.74
Total votes		14,796	100

== Collector election ==
1924 Cicero collector election
- April 1, 1924

Nominee	Timothy J. Buckley	David T. Brennan
Party	Republican	Democratic
Popular vote	7,608	7,166
Percentage	51.50%	48.50

Collector
Party	Candidate	Votes	%
Republican	Timothy J. Buckley	7,608	51.50
Democratic	David T. Brennan	7,166	48.50
Total votes		14,774	100

== Supervisor ==
1924 Cicero supervisor election
- April 1, 1924

Nominee	Peter S. Gieldzinski	Anton Maciejewski
Party	Republican	Democratic
Popular vote	7,807	6,942
Percentage	52.93%	47.07

Supervisor
Party	Candidate	Votes	%
Republican	Peter S. Gieldzinski	7,807	52.93
Democratic	Anton Maciejewski	6,942	47.07
Total votes		14,749	100

== Assessor election ==
1924 Cicero assessor election
- April 1, 1924

Nominee	Anton Vendley	Frank J. Novak
Party	Republican	Democratic
Popular vote	7,716	7,089
Percentage	52.12%	47.88

Assessor
Party	Candidate	Votes	%
Republican	Anton Vendley	7,716	52.12
Democratic	Frank J. Novak	7,089	47.88
Total votes		14,805	100

== Trustee election ==
1924 Cicero trustee election
- April 1, 1924

Nominee	L. Kucera	Stanley Dutkiewicz
Party	Republican	Democratic
Popular vote	7,894	6,871
Percentage	53.46%	46.54%

Clerk
Party	Candidate	Votes	%
Republican	L. Kucera	7,894	53.46
Democratic	Stanley Dutkiewicz	6,871	46.54
Total votes		14,765	100

== Library trustees ==
Clerk
Party	Candidate	Votes	%
Republican	Frank J. Vonesh	7,906	27.00
Republican	Mary Vaiounan	7,658	26.16
Democratic	Emma Brejcha	6,967	23.80
Democratic	James Kucharczyk	6,747	23.04

== Aftermath ==
The Chicago Outfit succeeded in securing a favorable result in the municipal elections. Cicero would remain under their control and remained their headquarters until after Al Capone was sent to prison in 1931 for tax evasion.

Klenha's Republican machine remained in power until the 1932 Cicero municipal elections, in which they were eviscerated by what the Chicago Tribune dubbed, "an outpouring of Democratic votes such as had never been approached in the town before."

== See also ==
- List of town presidents of Cicero, Illinois
