= 1923 Chicago aldermanic election =

- February 27 and April 3, 1923

All 50 seats in the Chicago City Council 26 seats needed for a majority
	Majority party	Minority party
Party	Democratic	Republican
Seats won	37	13
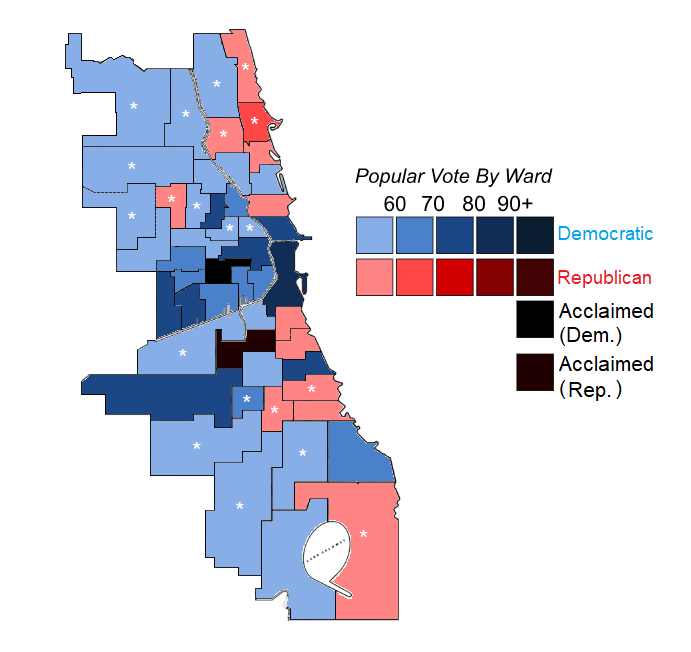
- Results by ward. The map shows the winning candidate's party affiliations even though aldermen ran as nonpartisans. A white asterisk (*) means the results for that ward were decided in a runoff vote.

Elections to the Chicago City Council were held on February 27, 1923. Candidates ran as nonpartisans, and in elections where no candidate received the majority of votes a runoff election was held between the top two finishers on April 3, the same day as the election for Mayor.

This was the first election with the new city council composed of fifty wards electing one alderman each. Previously there had been 35 wards each electing two aldermen, for a total of 70 seats in the council. At the time of the election, however, only 61 of those seats were filled. Of those 61 incumbents, 47 ran and 29 were elected to form part of the new council.

All told, despite the nonpartisan nature of the election, candidates affiliated with the Democratic Party won 37 of the seats, while those affiliated with the Republican Party won 13 seats. 20 runoff elections were held, of which Democrats won 17 and Republicans 3. Two aldermen—Democrat Johnny Powers of the new 25th ward and Republican Joseph B. McDonough of the new 13th—were returned without opposition.
