= 1920 United States Senate election in Illinois =

- November 2, 1920
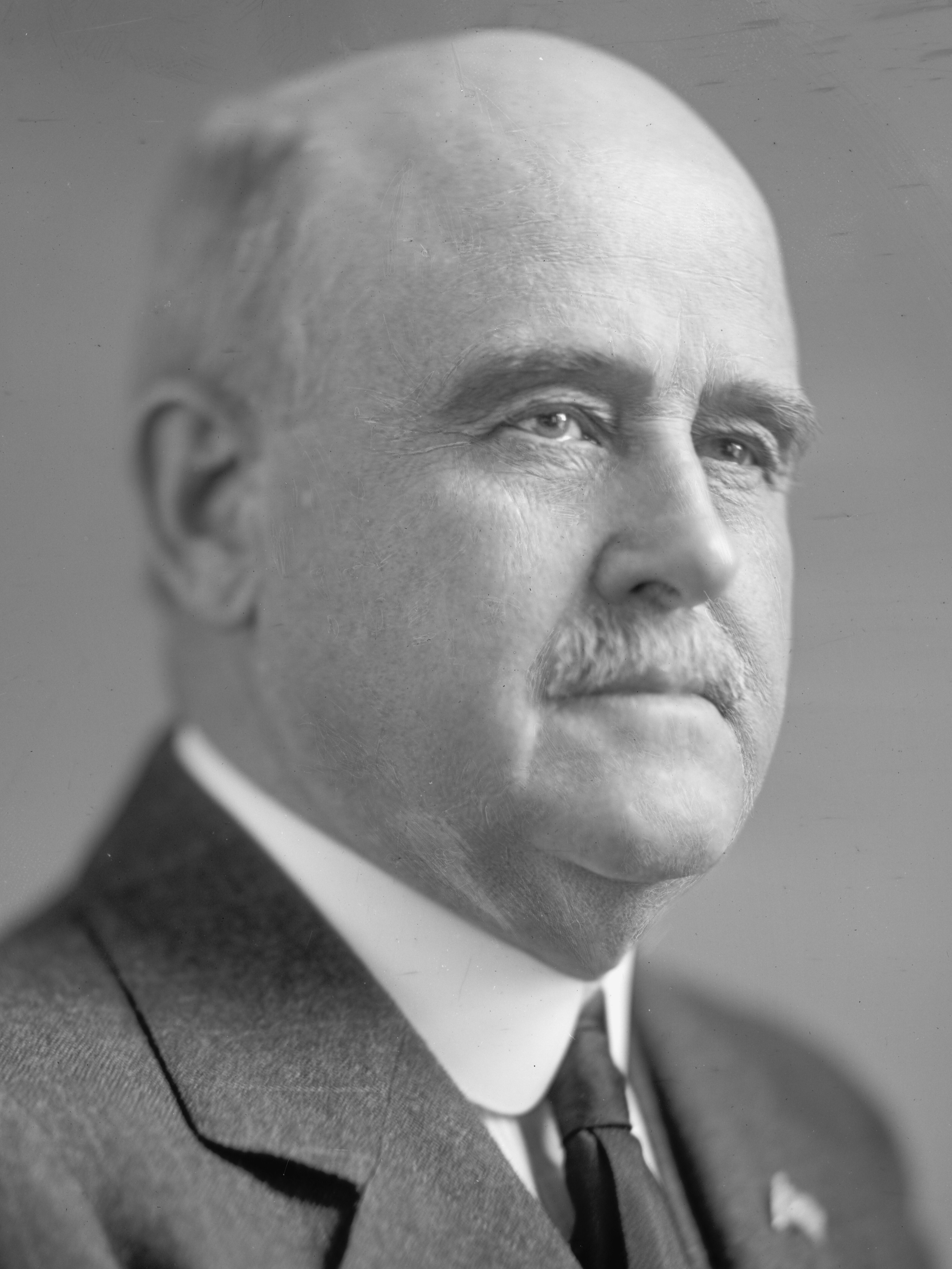

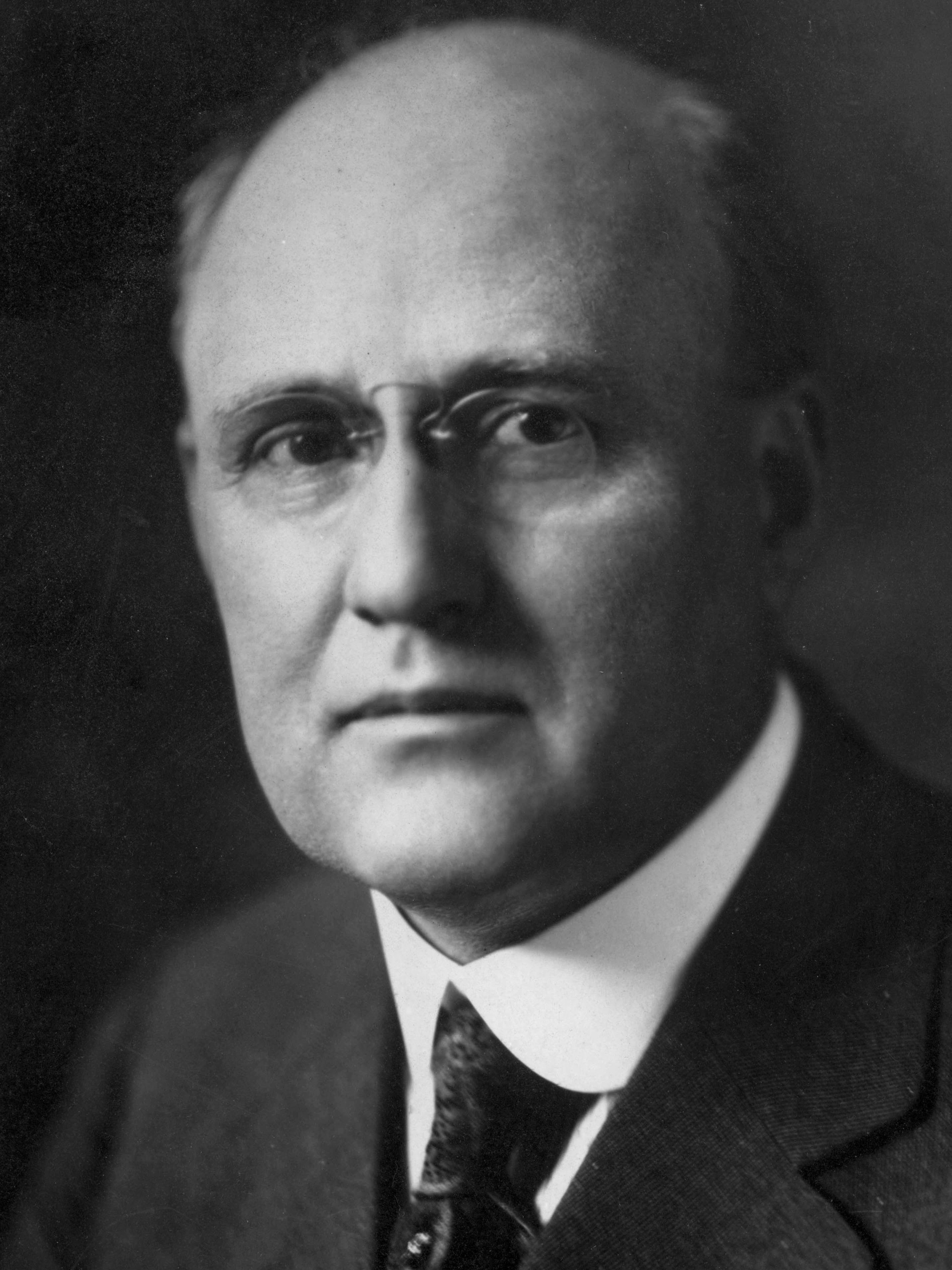
Nominee	William B. McKinley	Peter A. Waller
Party	Republican	Democratic
Popular vote	1,381,384	554,372
Percentage	66.83%	26.82%
- County results McKinley: 40–50% 50–60% 60–70% 70–80% 80–90% Waller: 40–50% 50–60%
U.S. senator before election
Lawrence Yates Sherman
Republican
Elected U.S. senator
William B. McKinley
Republican

The 1920 United States Senate election in Illinois took place on November 2, 1920.

Incumbent Republican senator Lawrence Yates Sherman opted to retire rather than seeking reelection. Fellow Republican William B. McKinley was elected to succeed him in office.

== Background ==
The primaries and general election coincided with those for House and those for state elections, but not those for president. Primaries were held September 15, 1920.

The 1920 United States Senate elections were the first to be held since the Nineteenth Amendment to the United States Constitution granted national women's suffrage. This was the first Illinois U.S. Senate election in which women could vote.

In 1916, incumbent Lawrence Yates Sherman made the decision to retire from politics and to not seek reelection in 1920, due to his failing hearing, which prevented him from hearing what was said on the Senate floor.

== Democratic primary ==
=== Candidates ===
- Robert Emmet Burke
- Peter A. Waller, Kewanee glove manufacturer

=== Campaign ===
Burke, known as "O.K. Bobby" by supporters, stood on a platform opposed to the League of Nations and ratification of the Treaty of Versailles. He was also opposed to Prohibition and critical of President Wilson. Waller had the support of the Democratic establishment. Neither ran an active campaign.

=== Results ===
Democratic primary
Party	Candidate	Votes	%
Democratic	Peter A. Waller	87,643	51.17
Democratic	Robert Emmet Burke	83,624	48.83
Total votes		171,267	100

== Republican primary ==
=== Candidates ===
- Burnett M. Chiperfield, former U.S. Representative at-large (from Canton)
- William B. McKinley, U.S. Representative from Champaign
- Frank L. Smith, U.S. Representative from Dwight

=== Results ===
Republican primary
Party	Candidate	Votes	%
Republican	William B. McKinley	372,530	46.60
Republican	Frank L. Smith	361,130	45.18
Republican	Burnett M. Chiperfield	65,742	8.22
Total votes		799,402	100

== Socialist primary ==
=== Candidates ===
- Gustave T. Fraenckel

=== Results ===
Socialist primary
Party	Candidate	Votes	%
Socialist	Gustave T. Fraenckel	2,013	100
Total votes		2,013	100

== General election ==
=== Candidates ===
- George Dodd Carrington Jr. (Single Tax)
- John Fitzpatrick, trade union leader
- Gustave T. Fraenckel (Socialist)
- William B. McKinley (Democratic), U.S. congressman
- Joseph B. Moody (Socialist Labor)
- Peter A. Waller (Republican)
- Frank B. Vennum (Prohibition Party), activist, capitalist, philanthropist, 1912 candidate for Illinois treasurer, 1918 U.S. Senate candidate

=== Results ===
1920 United States Senate election in Illinois
Party	Candidate	Votes	%
Republican	William B. McKinley	1,381,384	66.83
Democratic	Peter A. Waller	554,372	26.82
Socialist	Gustave T. Fraenckel	66,463	3.22
Farmer–Labor	John Fitzpatrick	50,749	2.46
Prohibition	Frank B. Vennum	10,186	0.49
Socialist Labor	Joseph B. Moody	3,107	0.15
Single Tax	George Dodd Carrington Jr.	784	0.04
Majority		827,012	40.01
Turnout		2,067,045	
Republican hold			

== See also ==
- 1920 United States Senate elections
