= 1926 United States Senate election in Illinois =

- November 2, 1926
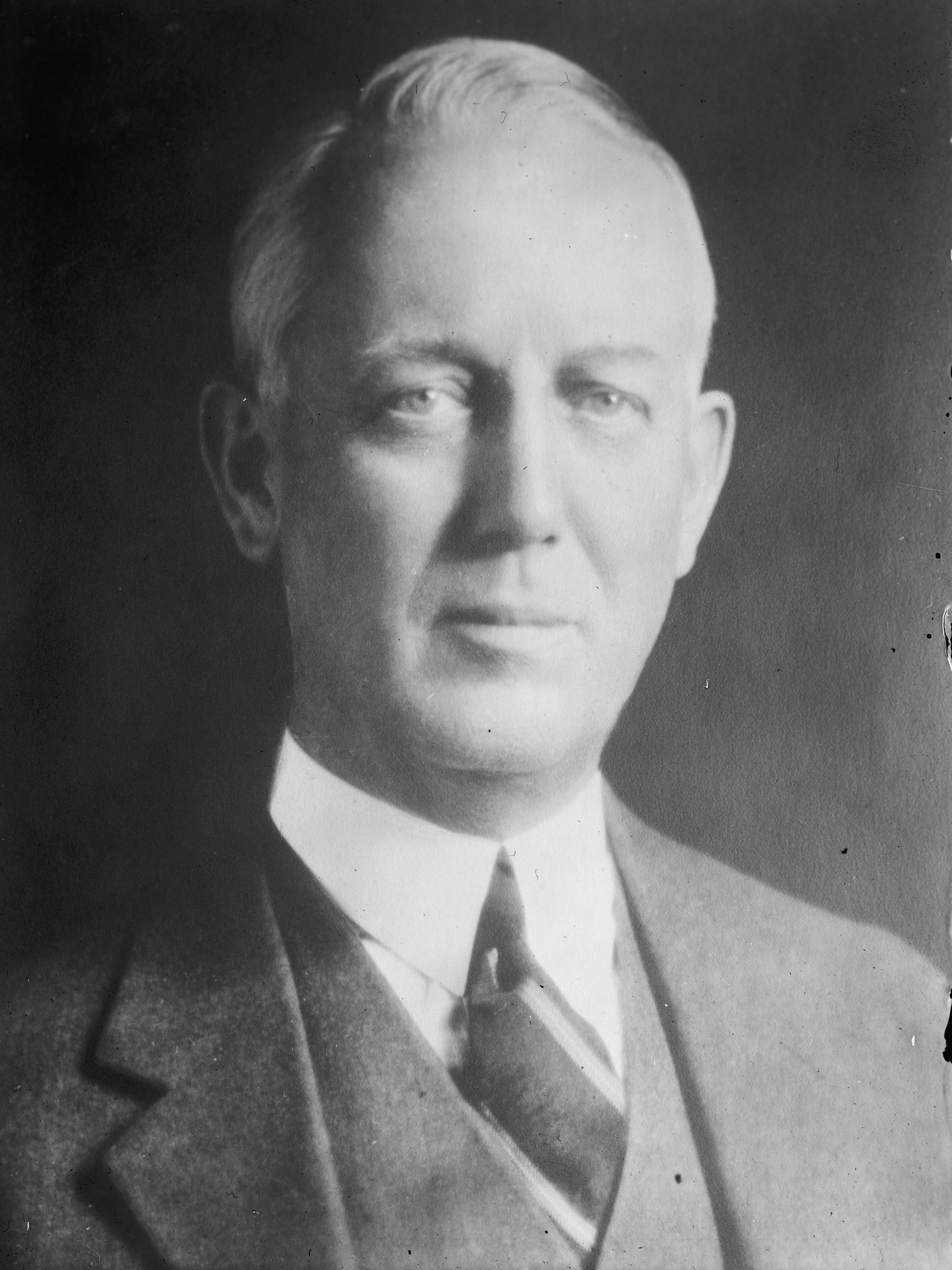

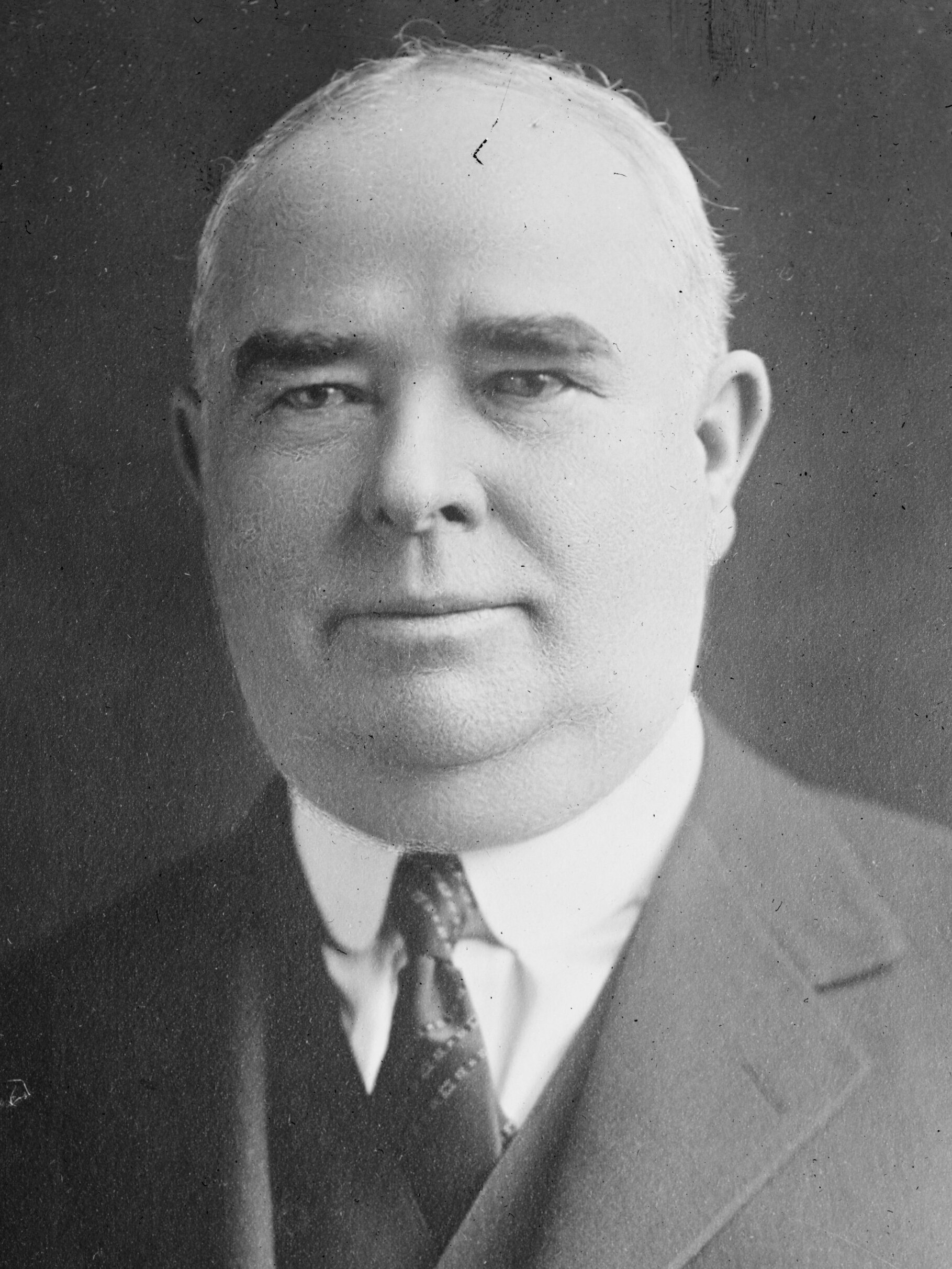

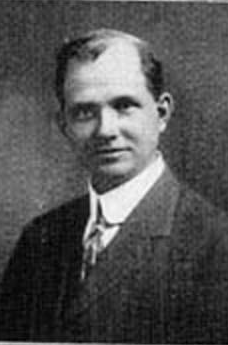
Nominee	Frank L. Smith	George E. Brennan	Hugh S. McGill
Party	Republican	Democratic	Independent
Popular vote	842,273	774,943	156,245
Percentage	46.86%	43.12%	8.69%
- County results Smith: 30–40% 40–50% 50–60% 60–70% 70–80% Brennan: 40–50% 50–60% 60–70%
U.S. senator before election
William B. McKinley
Republican
Elected U.S. senator
Frank L. Smith (Note: Due to allegations of election fraud, Smith was never seated by the U.S. Senate)
Republican

The 1926 United States Senate election in Illinois took place on November 2, 1926.

Incumbent first-term Republican senator William B. McKinley, lost renomination in the Republican primary.

The U.S. Senate ultimately refused to seat the election's winner, Republican Frank L. Smith, due to allegations of election fraud.

The primaries and general election coincided with those for House and those for state elections. Primaries were held April 13, 1926.

== Democratic primary ==
=== Candidates ===
- George E. Brennan, chairman of the Cook County Democratic Party
- James T. McDermott, former U.S. Representative from Chicago
- James O. Monroe, attorney and perennial candidate

=== Results ===
Democratic primary
Party	Candidate	Votes	%
Democratic	George E. Brennan	201,857	68.23
Democratic	James O. Monroe	55,965	18.92
Democratic	James T. McDermott	38,030	12.85
Write-in	Others	14	0.00
Total votes		295,866	100

== Republican primary ==
=== Candidates ===
- William B. McKinley, incumbent U.S. senator
- Frank L. Smith, former U.S. Representative from Dwight and candidate for Senate in 1920

=== Results ===
Republican primary
Party	Candidate	Votes	%
Republican	Frank L. Smith	624,023	54.41
Republican	William B. McKinley (incumbent)	522,771	45.59
Write-in	Others	4	0.00
Total votes		1,146,798	100

== Progressive primary ==
=== Candidates ===
- Parley Parker Christensen, chairman of the Illinois Progressive Party and 1920 Farmer–Labor Party presidential nominee

=== Results ===
Progressive primary
Party	Candidate	Votes	%
Progressive Party (US, 1924)	Parley Parker Christensen	495	99.20
Write-in	Others	4	0.80
Total votes		499	100

== General election ==
=== Candidates ===
- George E. Brennan, chairman of the Cook County Democratic Party (Democratic)
- Parley P. Christensen, chairman of the Illinois Progressive Party and 1920 Farmer–Labor Party presidential nominee (Progressive)
- J. Louis Engdahl, journalist and newspaper editor, candidate for U.S. Senate in 1924 (Workers)
- Samuel C. Irving (Independent)
- G. A. Jenning (Socialist Labor)
- James H. Kirby (Independent Democrat)
- James A. Logan (High Life)
- Morris Lynchenheim (Commonwealth Land)
- Hugh S. Magill, former Illinois state senator and candidate for U.S. Senate in 1912 (Independent)
- Raymond T. O’Keefe (Light Wines and Beer)
- Frank L. Smith, former U.S. Representative from Dwight (Republican)
- John T. Whitlock (Socialist)

=== Results ===
1926 United States Senate election in Illinois
Party	Candidate	Votes	%
Republican	Frank L. Smith	842,273	46.86%
Democratic	George E. Brennan	774,943	43.12%
Independent	Hugh S. Magill	156,245	8.69%
Progressive Party (US, 1924)	Parley P. Christensen	6,526	0.36%
Light Wines and Beer	Raymond T. O’Keefe	4,596	0.26%
Independent Democrat	James H. Kirby	4,203	0.23%
Socialist	John T. Whitlock	2,998	0.17%
Socialist Labor	G. A. Jenning	1,977	0.11%
Workers (Communist)	J. Louis Engdahl	1,309	0.07%
High Life	James A. Logan	1,161	0.06%
Independent	Samuel C. Irving	701	0.04%
Commonwealth Land	Morris Lynchenheim	427	0.02%
Majority		67,330	3.74%
Turnout		1,797,359	
Republican hold			

== See also ==
- 1926 United States Senate elections
