= George E. Brennan =

American political activist (died 1928)

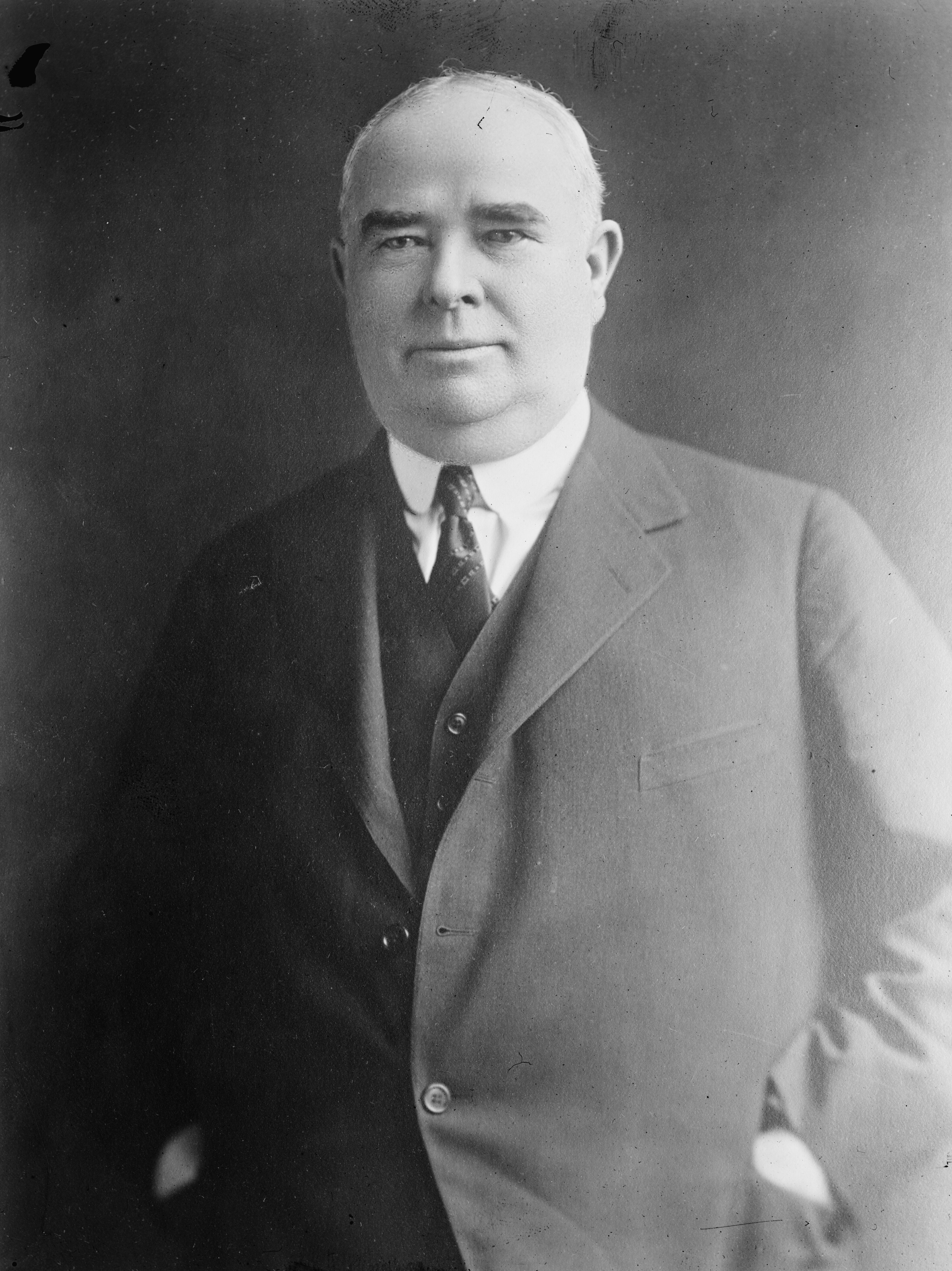
George E. Brennan, mid 1920s

George E. Brennan (May 20, 1865 – August 8, 1928) was a Democratic Party political boss in Illinois.

== Biography ==
Brennan was born in Ireland and he lost his right leg when he was 13. He had substituted for a switchman who was off on a post-payday drunk, at a coal mine in Braidwood, Illinois. He tried to uncouple two cars from a moving train and his right foot became wedged in a railroad switch.

He was "plump and nimble-witted, a poker player and duck hunter, a successful and honest businessman, a philanthropist who gave away several hundred wooden legs." In 1923 he supported William Emmett Dever as Mayor of Chicago.

Brennan was a member of the Democratic National Committee.

In 1926, Brennan "bet his bossdom against a seat in the U. S. Senate that Illinois is sick of Prohibition" and lost to Frank L. Smith.

Party political offices
| Preceded by Peter A. Waller | Democratic nominee for U.S. Senator from Illinois (Class 3); 1926 | Succeeded by Anton Cermak |
