= 1923 Chicago mayoral election =

- April 3, 1923
- Turnout: 78% ▼10 pp
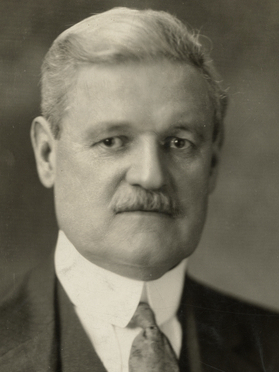

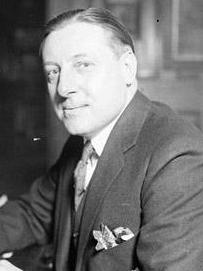

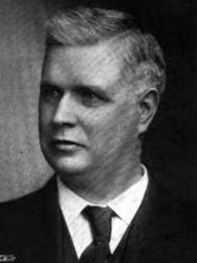
Nominee	William E. Dever	Arthur C. Lueder	William A. Cunnea
Party	Democratic	Republican	Socialist
Popular vote	390,413	258,094	41,186
Percentage	56.61%	37.42%	5.97%
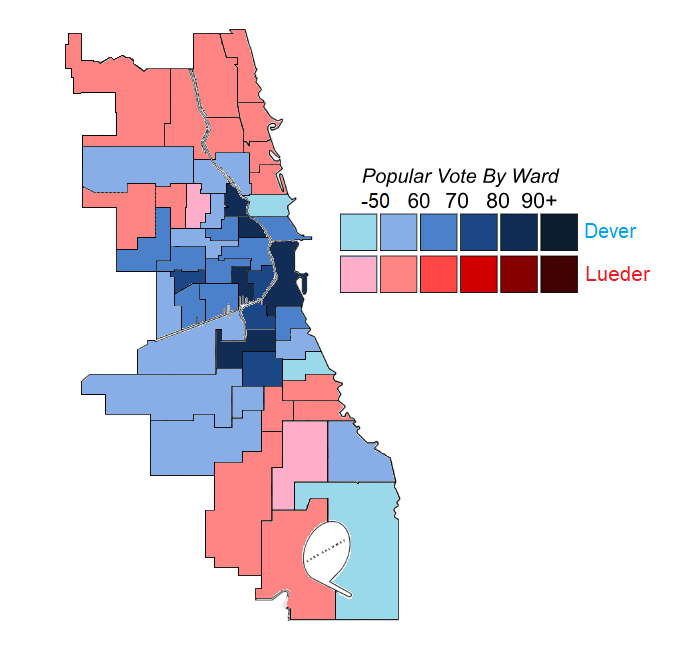
- Ward results
Mayor before election
William H. Thompson
Republican
Elected mayor
William E. Dever
Democratic

In the Chicago mayoral election of 1923, Democrat William E. Dever defeated Republican Arthur C. Lueder and Socialist William A. Cunnea. Elections were held on April 3, the same day as aldermanic runoffs.

To win their party's nominations, Dever went unopposed in the Democratic primary election, while Lueder handily defeated three opponents in the Republican Party's primary.

== Nominations ==
=== Democratic primary ===
Ahead of 1923, the Democratic Party had long been divided. Carter Harrison IV and Edward Fitzsimmons Dunne had once each led factions which held equal prominence to a faction led by Roger Charles Sullivan. However, by the end of the 1910s, Sullivan's wing of the Chicago Democratic Party had dwarfed theirs. By then, the blocs of Harrison and Dunne had effectively united as well. When Sullivan died in 1920, George Brennan became the party leader. He sought to unify the Democratic Party factions.

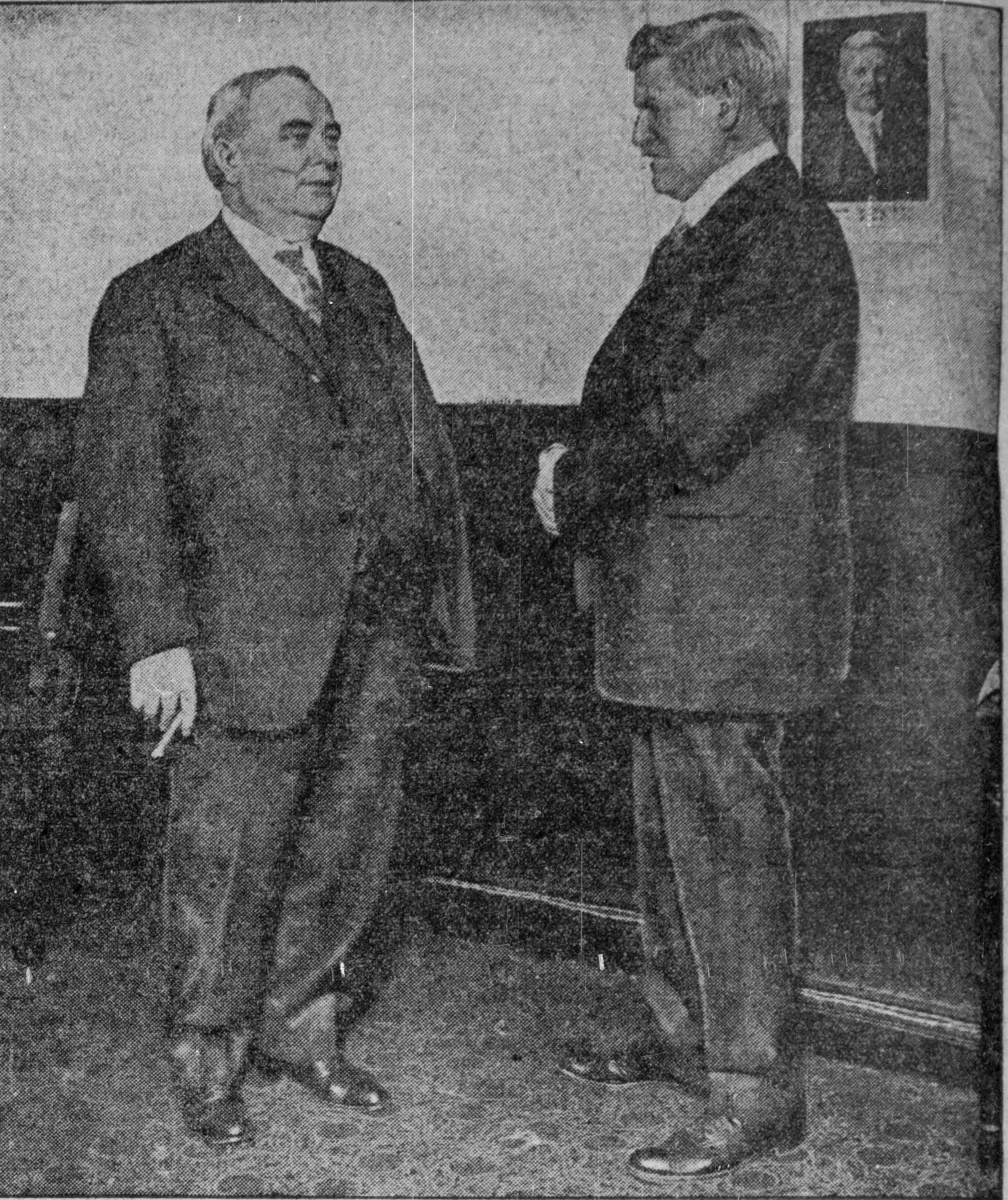
Dever (right) with George E. Brennan

While he had been long discussed as a potential mayoral candidate for almost two decades, in 1923, a combination of conditions and events catapulted William E. Dever to the nomination. In December 1922, a number of influential Chicago advocates for clean government had held a forum led by Mrs. Kellog Fairbank and Reverend Graham Taylor at the City Club of Chicago about the pending mayoral election which Clarence Darrow attended. This led to the establishment of the Non-Partisan Citizens Mayoral Committee led by Mrs. Kellog Fairbank, which sought to lobby both parties to put forth truthful alternatives to the corrupt and demagogic mayor Thompson. They decided that they would analyze prospective candidates and compile a shortlist of candidates they would be willing to back. Brennan, who was unable to narrow out the field of prospective candidates to personally back, took an interest in these efforts, seeing them as an opportunity to help inform him in narrowing out the field. The committee ultimately put forth a shortlist of seven prospective candidates they backed, including Judge William E. Dever. Dever had also been championed as a potential candidate by a broad array of individuals, including the Municipal Voters' League's George Sikes, William L. O'Connell (a leader in the party's Harrison-Dunne bloc), and Progressive Republican Harold Ickes. It was believed that Dever could unite the Democratic Party and serve as a clean and honest leader of the city's government. Brennan, particularly impressed that Dever had backing from both members of the Harrison-Dunne faction and from reformers outside of the party, decided to take a closer look at him as a candidate. Upon meeting with him, he found comradery and a positive working dynamic with Dever. He struck an arrangement under which, if elected mayor, he would allow Dever independence, but expected that Dever would, in turn, agree not utilize his patronage powers to build a political machine usurping Brennan's leadership of the party. After finding no opposition to Dever as a candidate from within the party leadership, he announced the next day that Dever was the party-backed candidate for mayor.

Before Dever had become the consensus candidate, among the individuals speculated as prospective candidates by the press was Anton Cermak.

Brennan worked to ensure that Dever was unopposed in the Democratic primary.

Despite Brennan pushing forth Dever's candidacy, the public generally did not view Dever to be a "machine" candidate. The public generally perceived that reformist citizens organizations had advocated Dever to the Democratic party leaders.

The Democratic primary was regarded as having had a large turnout, considering that there were uncontested races for mayor, City Treasurer and City Clerk.

Democratic primary (February 27, 1923)
Party	Candidate	Votes	%
Democratic	William Emmett Dever	165,338	100
Turnout		165,338	

Results by ward
Ward	Dever	Dever %
1st	5,475	100%
2nd	1,218	100%
3rd	1,949	100%
4th	1,983	100%
5th	2,034	100%
6th	2,160	100%
7th	3,471	100%
8th	3,184	100%
9th	2,030	100%
10th	1,911	100%
11th	5,873	100%
12th	3,909	100%
13th	2,695	100%
14th	7,636	100%
15th	5,260	100%
16th	5,215	100%
17th	3,117	100%
18th	4,659	100%
19th	3,155	100%
20th	3,921	100%
21st	3,454	100%
22nd	3,431	100%
23rd	4,029	100%
24th	2,195	100%
25th	3,053	100%
26th	3,989	100%
27th	3,733	100%
28th	3,833	100%
29th	6,927	100%
30th	8,584	100%
31st	2,625	100%
32nd	3,401	100%
33rd	4,222	100%
34th	3,103	100%
35th	1,527	100%
36th	1,440	100%
37th	3,295	100%
38th	3,304	100%
39th	4,154	100%
40th	2,062	100%
41st	1,991	100%
42nd	3,054	100%
43rd	1,723	100%
44th	1,942	100%
45th	3,222	100%
46th	1,601	100%
47th	1,998	100%
48th	1,662	100%
49th	3,140	100%
50th	1,789	100%
Total	165,338	100

=== Republican primary ===
Due to his poor health, there had been uncertainty as to whether two-term incumbent Republican William H. Thompson would run for reelection. He was also seen as more vulnerable to being unseated by a strong Democratic opponent, as Thompson had severed ties with a number of key political allies, including Robert E. Crowe and Frederick Lundin. One of the final factors in Thompson's decision not to seek reelection was a scandal involving campaign manager being implicated in shaking down vendors of school supplies for bribes and political contributions. Thompson had bled middle class support over rumors of corruption in his administration, and had bled support from working class votes over his backing at the time of Prohibition, which Chicago voters had made their opposition known by a margin in excess of eighty-points in a 1919 referendum on the matter. Uneager to joust with Dever, nearly a week after Dever became the presumptive Democratic candidate, Thompson announced his decision not to run with only a month before the Republican primary. This created an open race for the nomination.

=== Candidates ===
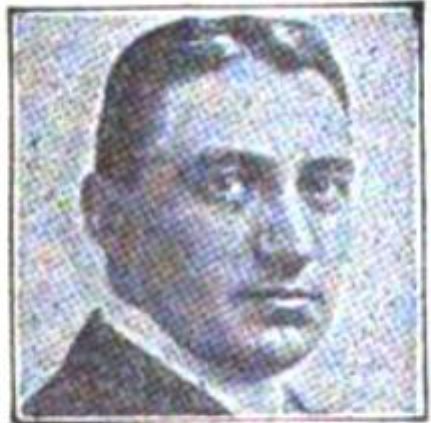
Edward R. Litsinger (photographed) performed the strongest among the primary opponents that Lueder defeated

- Bernard P. Barasa, judge of the Municipal Court of Chicago
- Edward R. Listinger, member of the Cook County Board of Review,
- Arthur C. Lueder, Chicago postmaster and businessman
- Arthur M. Millard, president of the Masonic Bureau of Service and Employment

=== Campaign ===
Arthur C. Lueder was backed by the Brundage-McCormick/Tribune and Deneen blocs of the party. He was also backed by Robert E. Crowe. Lueder ran on a "ticket", mutually being endorsed by and endorsing city treasurer candidate John V. Healy and city clerk candidate William H. Cruden, neither of whom were opposed in their primaries.

Edward R. Litsinger was backed by the William Randolph Hearst and Frederick Lundin blocs of the party, and was also the candidate supported by the remaining members of Thompson's dwindling faction of the party.

Bernard P. Barasa ran on a pro-liquor platform amid prohibition.

=== Results ===
Lueder won a greater margin of victory than even his own campaign had expected.

Republican primary (February 27, 1923)
Party	Candidate	Votes	%
Republican	Arthur C. Lueder	128,704	42.76
Republican	Edward R. Litsinger	74,560	24.77
Republican	Arthur M. Millard	51,054	16.96
Republican	Bernard P. Barasa	46,690	15.51
Turnout		301,008	

=== Socialist nomination ===
William A. Cunnea was nominated by the Socialist Party. Cunnea had been a Democratic nominee for alderman in 1899, and had been the Socialist nominee for Cook County State's Attorney in 1912 and 1916. By profession, Cunnea was a labor lawyer.

== General election ==
=== Campaigning ===
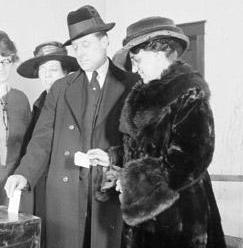
Lueder and his wife cast their votes

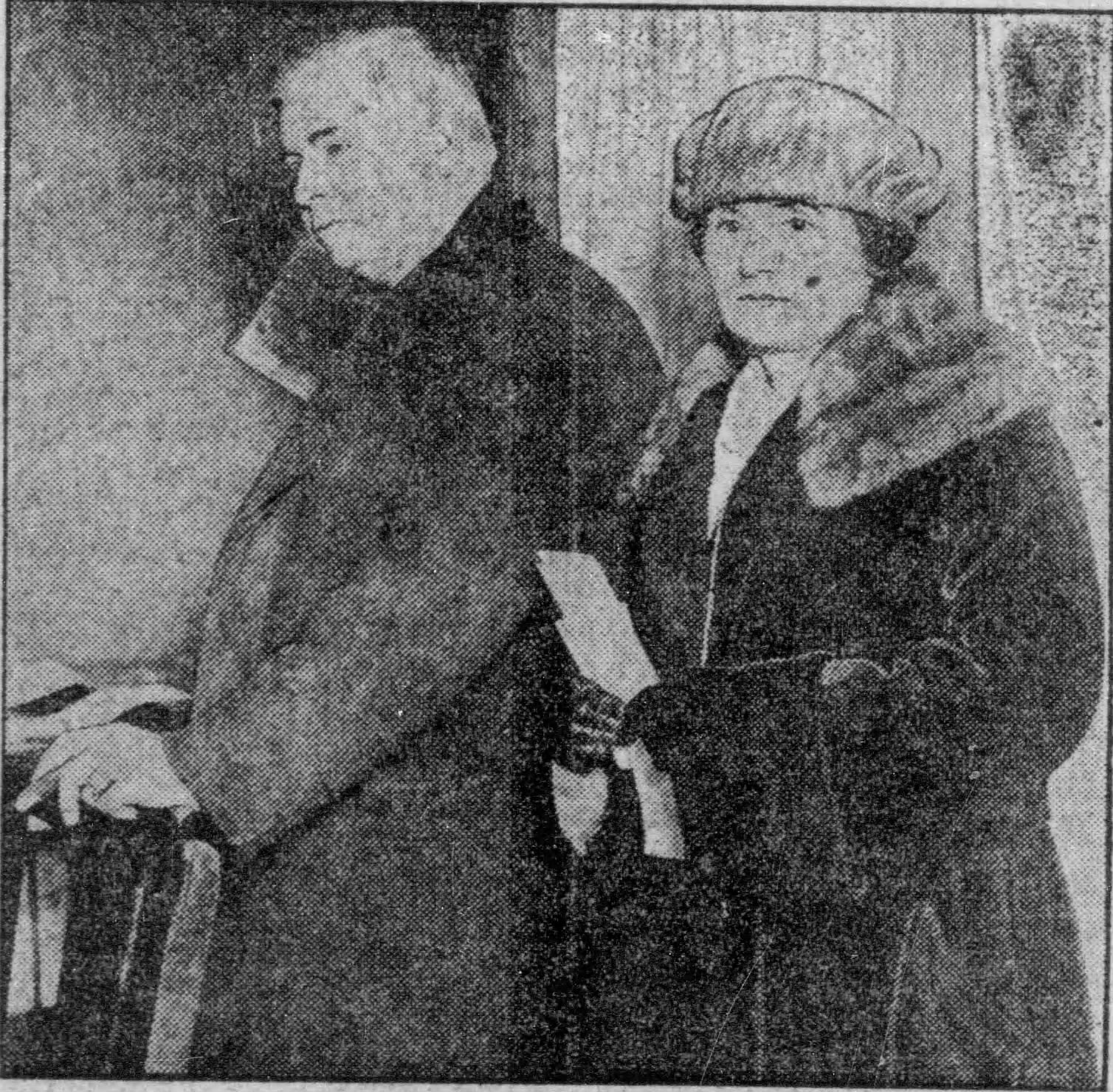
William Cunnea and his wife cast their votes

Both major party candidates campaigned as reformers. On March 18, 1923, Oscar Hewitt of the "Chicago Tribune" characterized the campaign one of the “mildest”

At the time of the election, Chicago was seen as a Republican-leaning city, especially due to the influx of black voters to the city as part of the Great Migration, a demographic largely voted for the Republican Party at the time. Furthermore, the city had not voted Democratic in a presidential election over the previous three decades, with the Republican nominees carrying the city's vote in all but the 1912 presidential election when former Republican president Theodore Roosevelt carried the city on the third party Progressive Party ticket. However, factors harming the Republican Party's prospects included a divide among the party's ranks, the scandals that had tarnished Thompson's administration, and tax increases made during Thompson's mayoralty.

Dever was only the second resident of Edgewater to run for mayor, after only Nathaniel Sears, and consequentially would be the first Edgewater resident to serve as mayor. Dever had a strong reputation for honesty, and was seen to be smart and well-spoken. He was supported by many reformers and independents. Many went so far as to organize the Independent Dever League, a group created to act in support of Dever's campaign. Dever won strong backing from progressive independents.

The traction issue reemerged in this election. Lueder promised to "study" the possibility of municipal purchase of street railways. Dever, on the other hand, was far more enthusiastic on the issue, proclaiming that the most critical task for the victor of the election would be to resolve problems with the city's public transit. These problems included price increases and declining quality of service provided by the Chicago Surface Lines. A long time advocate for municipal ownership, Dever believed that it would be ideal for the city to buy-out the Chicago Surface Lines once their franchise expired in 1927. He also had hopes of possibly acquiring the Chicago Rapid Transit Company. Socialist Cunnea campaigned for a 5-cent fare.

Lueder offered a strong contrast to the incumbent Republican mayor, being dignified and soft-spoken, with a strong reputation of personal integrity. Thompson did not campaign at all on behalf of Republican candidate Lueder. Lueder had strong support from the business community. Running a tidy campaign, positioning himself as a nonpolitical businessman, Lueder focused on securing the support of the Republican Party's factions. He maintained his support from the Brundage-McCormick and Deneen factions and picked up the backing of key figures from the Thompson faction of the party despite Thompson's own refusal to back him.

Lueder attempted to portray himself as an expert administrator. Lueder argued that his experience in real estate and as postmaster had sufficiently prepared him for the administrative role of the mayoralty, asserting that it provided a more valuable experience than holding various minor elected posts. He stated, "I believe what the people want is a businessman for mayor. I believe that want a man who will devote his time to his duties as mayor of Chicago, and not building up a political machine.

Lueder refused to formally debate Dever, despite Dever's request for debates. However, on numerous occasions they spoke at the same events.

Eugene V. Debs actively campaigned for Socialist nominee William A. Cunnea.

The campaign was largely uneventful, with little tenuous debate or controversy arising. However, in the final stretch of the campaign, a level of anti-Catholic sentiment was vocalized by select segments of Chicago's population that were unhappy at the prospect of Dever, as a Catholic, being mayor. At the same time, some made an effort at the close of the election to draw a link between the Ku Klux Klan and the Republican campaign. Outside of this last minute heightening of discourse in select corners, the campaign proved to be relatively tame.

=== Endorsements ===
William A. Cunnea

Individuals

- Eugene V. Debs
William E. Dever

Individuals

- Edward Fitzsimmons Dunne, former governor of Illinois and former mayor of Chicago
- Margaret Haley
- Carter Harrison IV, former mayor of Chicago
- Harold L. Ickes
- Mrs. Kellog Fairbank
- Julia Lathrop
- Mary McDowell
- Charles E. Merriam, Republican Chicago mayoral nominee in 1911
- Raymond Robins
- Colonel A.A. Sprague
- Graham Taylor

Newspapers

- Chicago Daily Journal
Arthur C. Lueder

Individuals

- Charles S. Deneen

Newspapers

- Chicago Daily News
- Chicago Tribune

=== Polling ===
Early into the race the candidates ran close in the polls. However, Dever took a strong lead in the race. By the end of the race, gambling boss James Patrick O'Leary had assigned 1-7 betting odds in favor of a Dever victory.

==== Chicago Tribune straw polls ====
The Chicago Tribune conducted straw polls during a portion of the campaign. These were not modern scientific polls, and many focused on specific sub-portions of the city's populace, rather than true representative samples.

Tribune began conducting these polls on March 7, 1923, with the first being published the next day. By March 18, the Tribune's analysis of its polling was that Dever began the general election campaign with an advantage over Lueder.

The final amalgamation of the polls predicted Dever receiving 52.21%, Leuder receiving 39.37, and Cunnea receiving 8.42%. It had predicted 378,000 votes for Dever, 285,000 votes for Lueder, and 61,000 votes for Cunnea. The prediction of total votes for Lueder proved to be extremely accurate. After the election, the newspaper argued that the reason its polls predicted a larger socialist vote was because industrial workers were proportionally a greater share of those questioned in the straw polls than a share of the election vote. They also found that they had underestimated the share that Dever would receive of the black vote.

View source data.

Chicago Tribune straw polls
Date published	Sample size	William Emmett Dever (Democrat)	Arthur Leuder (Republican)	William A. Cunnea (Socialist)	Uncommitted	Lead
April 1, 1923	11,892	58.85%	34.41%	6.74%	—N/a	+24.44
March 31, 1923	5,072 (Note: Survey of white-collar workers at downtown office buildings. Buildings were the Wrigley Building, Old Colony Building, Commonwealth Edison Building, Lumber Exchange Building, Title & Trust Building, Ashland Block, Conway Building, McCormick Building, Peoples Gas Building, Chamber of Commerce Building, Westminster Building, Railway Exchange Building, Transportation Building, and Monadnock Building.)	46.75%	47.99%	5.26%	—N/a	+1.24
March 30, 1923	4,376 (Note: Straw poll conducted outside of sixteen movie theaters (Armitage, Ashland, Atlantic, Boulevard, Brighton, Crescent, Halfield, Harvard, Julian, Langley, Marshall Square, Oakley, Orpheus, People's, Schindler's, Woodlawn).)	62.50%	30.53%	6.97%	—N/a	+32.97
March 29, 1923	3,582 (Note: Straw poll conducted outside of thirteen Ascher Brothers theaters: Oakland Square, Metropolitan, Frolle, Commercial, West Englewood, Cosmopolitan, Crown, Terminal, Portage Park, Lane Court, Chateau, Salo, Kenwood)	57.45%	37.13%	5.42%	—N/a	+10.32
March 28, 1923	3,644 (Note: Straw poll conducted outside of twelve movie theaters operated by Lubliner & Trinz (including the Biograph Theater, Covent Garden Theatre, Knickerbocker Theatre, Pantheon Theater, Paramount Theatre, Michigan Theatre, Senate Theatre, Wilson Theater, Vitagraph Theatre, and West End Theatre))	57.44%	37.90%	4.67%	—N/a	+19.54
March 27, 1923	1,080 (Note: Poll aimed to survey "highbrow" citizens. Places/events canvassed included: intersection of Monroe Street and Wabash Avenue; intersection of State Street and Van Buren Street; Randolph Street Station; Culture Club tea event at the La Salle Hotel; Illinois Chamber of Commerce meeting, and a gathering at a theater.)	46.57%	44.81%	8.61%	—N/a	+1.76
March 26, 1923	6,323 (Note: 2,519 surveyed at theaters, 2,363 interview at Chicago "L" stations, 1,441 interviewed on business streets. Among theaters: 166 surveyed at the Douglas, 133 at the Crown, 52 at the Star, 73 at the Atlantic, 223 at the Karlov, 448 at the Harvard, 230 at the Armitage, 639 at the McVicker's, 275 at the Majestic, 280 at the Lin. Hippodrome. Among "L" Stations: 330 surveyed at State/Lake, 625 at Van Buren/State, 637 for north side trains at Madison/Wabash, 465 for west side trains at Madison/Wabash. For business streets: 308 at Blue Island Avenue south of Roosevelt Road, 225 at Roosevelt Road west of Paulina Street, 239 along North Avenue west of Kedzie Avenue, 234 along 22nd Street west of Marshall Boulevard, 178 along Chicago Avenue west of Cicero Avenue, 258 along Madison Street west of California Avenue.)	51.72%	41.50%	6.78%	—N/a	+10.22
March 25, 1923	8,145 (Note: Poll conducted via telephone)	30.83%	38.83%	1.47%	28.86%	+8.00
March 24, 1923	2,051 (Note: Poll of six main thoroughfares on the West Side selected due to the large number of small businesses (poll aimed to find the opinion of "small business men". Locations were: North Avenue and Milwaukee Avenue west; between the intersections of Milwaukee Avenue & Grand Avenue and Grand Avenue & North Avenue; Chicago Avenue and Milwaukee Avenue west; Madison Street and Ogden Avenue west; Roosevelt Road and Halsted Street west; 22nd Street and Wood Street west)	59.39%	28.96%	11.65%	—N/a	+30.43
March 23, 1923	2,064 (Note: Straw poll of industrial workers. Locations included: Pullman Company car shops, B. Kuppenheimer & Co., RR Donnelley, V.F. Hall Printing Co., Engers & Hall printers, La Salle Engraving Co., Blakeley-Oswald Printing Co., Kohl-Madden Printing Ink Co., Schulze Baking Company)	44.77%	33.19%	22.04%	—N/a	+11.58
March 22, 1923	2,362 (Note: Straw poll of industrial employees. The Chicago Tribune described those questioned as, "employees making electrical apparatus, musical instruments, addressograph machines, stoves, candy, foundry products and steel". Firms surveyed were Benjamin Electric Manufacturing Company, Kellogg Switchboard and Supply Company, Lyon & Healy musical instruments, The Addressograph Co.'s office and factory, Cribben & Sexton stoves, Bunte Candy Company, Crane Company, and the Illinois Steel Company.)	56.90%	33.78%	9.31%	—N/a	+23.12
March 21, 1923	1,258 (Note: Straw poll conducted at movie theaters in the new 43rd ward (the Criterion, Clybourn, Dearborn, Ideal, Janet, Mohawk, Orchard, and Windsor theaters. The poll's 1,258 respondents were roughly one-tenth of the 12,666 voters that the Tribune projected would vote in the ward if voter turnout in the ward reached 80%. The Chicago Tribune opined that the Lueder's narrow lead solidly indicated that Lueder was favored to carry the ward. This assertion was partly based both upon evidence in an earlier Chicago Tribune poll. It was also based on the geographic location of the theaters, which the newspaper believed precluded the participation of many from the Republican-leaning lake shore area of the ward. It was further based a suspicion the newspaper made (based upon assumptions related to economic class) that residents of the Republican-learning lake shore area in the ward possibly did not as attend movies as frequently as other residents of the ward.)	46.58%	47.22%	6.20%	—N/a	+0.64
March 20, 1923	6,443 (Note: Survey of white-collar workers at downtown office buildings. Buildings were the Wrigley Building, Old Colony Building, Commonwealth Edison Building, Lumber Exchange Building, Title & Trust Building, Ashland Block, National Life Building, New York Life Insurance Building, Reaper Block, Conway Building, McCormick Building, Peoples Gas Building, Chamber of Commerce Building, Monroe Building, Tower Building, Westminster Building, Railway Exchange Building, Transportation Building, and Monadnock Building.)	41.49%	54.23%	4.28%	—N/a	+12.74
March 19, 1923	4,461 (Note: Straw poll conducted at Chicago "L" stations. Stations were Quincy/Wells, Clark/Lake, Adams/Wabash, State/Lake, Randolph/Wells, Randolph/Wabash, Madison/Wabash, LaSalle/Van Buren, Marshfield, and Wilson.)	47.39%	46.25%	6.37%	—N/a	+1.14
March 18, 1923	3,566 (Note: Straw poll conducted outside of the five large movie theaters operated by Balaban and Katz. Two were located on the South Side, two were located in the Chicago Loop, one was located on the North Side, and one was located on the West Side.)	45.40%	47.78%	6.81%	—N/a	+2.38
March 16, 1923	2,199 (Note: Straw poll of streetcar men, conducted outside of seven streetcar barns (located at the corners of Kedzie and Van Buren; 69th and Ashland; Cicero and North, Clark and Dewey; 38th and Cottage Grove; Lincoln and Sheffield; Clark and Devon).)	66.35%	21.46%	12.19%	—N/a	+44.95
March 15, 1923	1,557 (Note: Straw poll conducted outside of several theaters: Lyric in the 2nd ward, Franklin in the 2nd ward, Langley in the 6th ward, Woodlawn in the 6th ward, Marshall Square in the 21st ward, Atlantic in the 23rd ward, Oakley in the 34th ward, Buckingham in the 46th ward, and Lakeside in the 48th ward.)	52.99%	39.69%	7.32%	—N/a	+13.30
March 14, 1923	1,183 (Note: Straw poll aimed to assess the views of German-American voters. Straw poll was conducted at men's meeting held at Social Turner Hall, men's meeting held at Lincoln Turner Hall, men's skat club at Social Turner Hall, Victorian players event at Social Turner Hall, women's bunco party at Social Turner Hall, dance at Vorwaerts Turner Hall, men's meeting at Heidelberg Hall, and men's meeting at Mozart Hall.)	17.67%	59.43%	15.30%	—N/a	+41.76
March 13, 1923	681 (Note: Straw poll aimed to assess the views of Polish-American voters. Straw poll was conducted at Pulaski Hall at 13th Street and Ashland Avenue; Lyric Theater at 1217 Milwaukee Avenue; the area near the intersection of 51st Street and Throop Street; the Polish National Alliance headquarters; St. Joseph Catholic Union at 48th Street and Paulina Street; Chopin Theatre at Milwaukee Avenue and Division Street; Holy Trinity Church banquet.)	83.26%	12.04%	4.70%	—N/a	+71.22
March 12, 1923	1,647 (Note: Poll of "colored" voters in an area of the city bounded by 31st street, 35th street, State Street, and Indiana Avenue.)	33.09%	63.27%	3.64%	—N/a	+30.18
March 11, 1923	3,257 (Note: Straw poll conducted outside of movie theaters in several wards (per the pre-1923 ward map). The pre-1923 fourth ward saw two theaters polled (the Vista and New Park theaters), as did the 43rd ward (Criterion and Plaza theaters). All other wards surveyed only had polls conducted at one theater. The other theaters were the Brighton (12th ward) People’s (13th ward), Halfield (14th ward) Boulevard (16th ward), Orpheum (26th ward), Ashland (27th ward), Tiffin (30th ward), Schindler (31st ward), Crescent (38th ward), Windsor (43rd ward), and the Julian (46th ward).)	58.77%	34.45%	6.79%	—N/a	+23.32
March 10, 1923	1,283 (Note: Straw poll conducted during "second shows" during night at nine theaters: Oakland, Kenwood, West Englewood, Cosmopolitan, Terminal, Lane Court, Chateau, and Calo.)	45.91%	49.81%	4.29%	—N/a	+3.90
March 9, 1923	2,762 (Note: Straw poll conducted during after first nighttime showings at several movie theaters. The theaters were the Oakland in the 3rd ward, Metropolitan in the 4th ward, Kenwood in the 5th ward, Frolic in the 5th ward, Commercial in the 10th ward, West Englewood in the 126th ward, Cosmopolitan in the 19th ward, Crown in the 32nd ward, Terminal in the 40th ward, Portage Park in the 41st ward, Lane Court in the 43r ward, Chateau in the 48th ward, and Salo in the 50th ward.)	48.59%	44.06%	5.18%	—N/a	+4.53
March 8, 1923	3,680 (Note: Straw poll of conducted at fifteen Lubliner & Trinz theaters: the Michigan in ward 3, Wilson in ward 28, Crawford in ward 29, Senate in ward 29, Madison Square in ward 30, West End in ward 30, Paramount in ward 29, Covent Garden in ward 44, Biography in ward 44, Vintagraph in ward 45, Lakeside in ward 48, Pantheon in ward 48, Knickerbocker in ward 49, Ellantee in wards 49 and 50, Pershing in ward 50.)	49.02	53.53%	5.08%	—N/a	+4.51

Notes on polling samples

=== Results ===
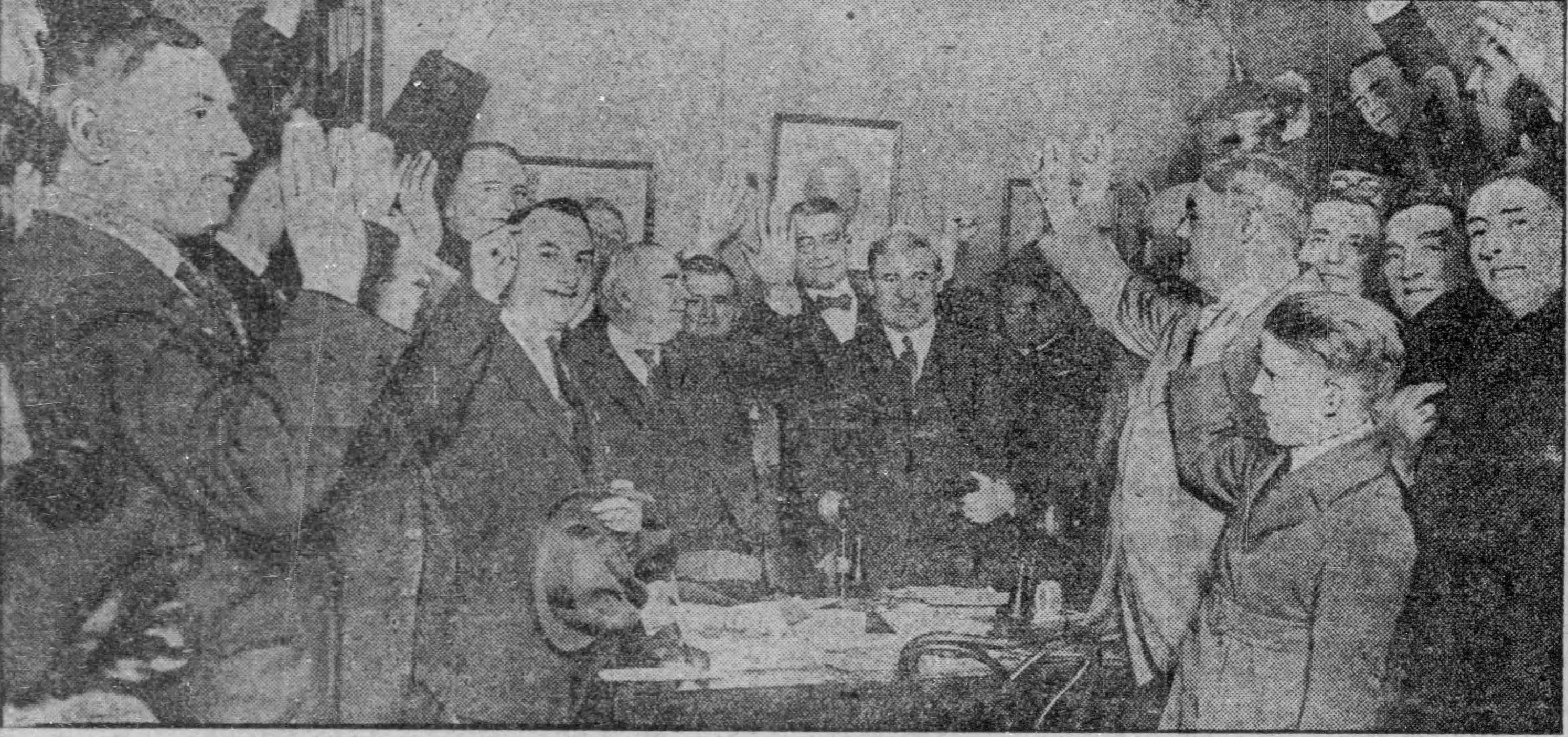
Celebration of Dever's victory featuring Dever and other prominent Chicago Democrats

The voter turnout in the election (78%) was the second-lowest in at least 24 years, behind only the 74% that participated in the 1901 election.

Dever's performance was strong. With the exception of William Hale Thompson's 147,477 margin of victory in 1915, no mayor had carried a mayoral election in Chicago with a margin of victory exceeding 25,000 in the previous two decades. Dever had a 132,319 vote margin of victory.

Dever won thirty-two of the city's fifty wards (the 1923 election was the first after the city had redistricted itself from 35 to 50 wards). His greatest share of votes was in the city's ten inner-city ethnic wards, located in traditional Democratic strongholds. Lueder won the wards in traditionally-Republican areas on the edge of the city. However, Dever made inroads with voters in these edge wards. Dever also had made inroads among Black and Jewish voters.

Dever received 83.47% of the Polish-American vote, while Lueder received 12.43% and Cunnea received 4.04%.

Dever received more than 80% of the Italian American vote.

Dever received 53% of the African American vote by some accounts. This was a change from the typical voting pattern of Chicago African American voters, who regularly voted for the Republican Party.

Dever received slightly less than half of the Swedish American and German American votes.

1923 Chicago mayoral election (general election)
Party	Candidate	Votes	%
Democratic	William E. Dever	390,413	56.61
Republican	Arthur C. Lueder	258,094	37.42
Socialist	William A. Cunnea	41,186	5.97
Turnout		689,693	89
