= Benjamin Electric Manufacturing Company =

Benjamin Electric Manufacturing Company was a Des Plaines, Illinois electrical company founded in the late 19th century.

== History ==
Benjamin Electric Manufacturing Company was founded by Reuben Berkley Benjamin and filed its first patent for an electric lamp socket in 1898. The part was manufactured in Benjamin's basement by high school kids who worked after school.

The company was officially organized in 1901 with an investment of $2,400. The original founders included Walter D. Steele, Ruben B. Benjamin, and two others. It originally operated out of a small basement space, but moved to Des Plaines in 1929. In 1945 it built a laboratory for testing and research, and by 1948 it employed more than 1,200 people.

In 1958, Benjamin was bought out by Thomas Industries, Inc. It continued to operate under the Benjamin name as a division of Thomas Industries. At the time of acquisition, it employed 600 people in two manufacturing facilities, one in Des Plaines and the other in Burlingame, California.

The company's factory in Illinois was closed in 1963, with manufacturing moving to a Thomas Industries 250,000-square-foot (23,000 m^{2}) plant in Sparta, TN.

== Products ==
Benjamin Electric Manufacturing Company was the manufacturer of industrial and commercial lighting, floodlights, and signalling devices. It pioneered a wireless cluster for lighting equipment, designed to produce higher levels of lighting from carbon filament lamps. The company went on to manufacture various electrical products. One of its most notable products was a series of non-contact fire alarm horns, introduced in the early 1920s. Throughout his lifetime, Reuben Benjamin secured 300 patents, most of which were used for products at the company.
