= William B. McKinley =

American politician (1856–1926)

William Brown McKinley
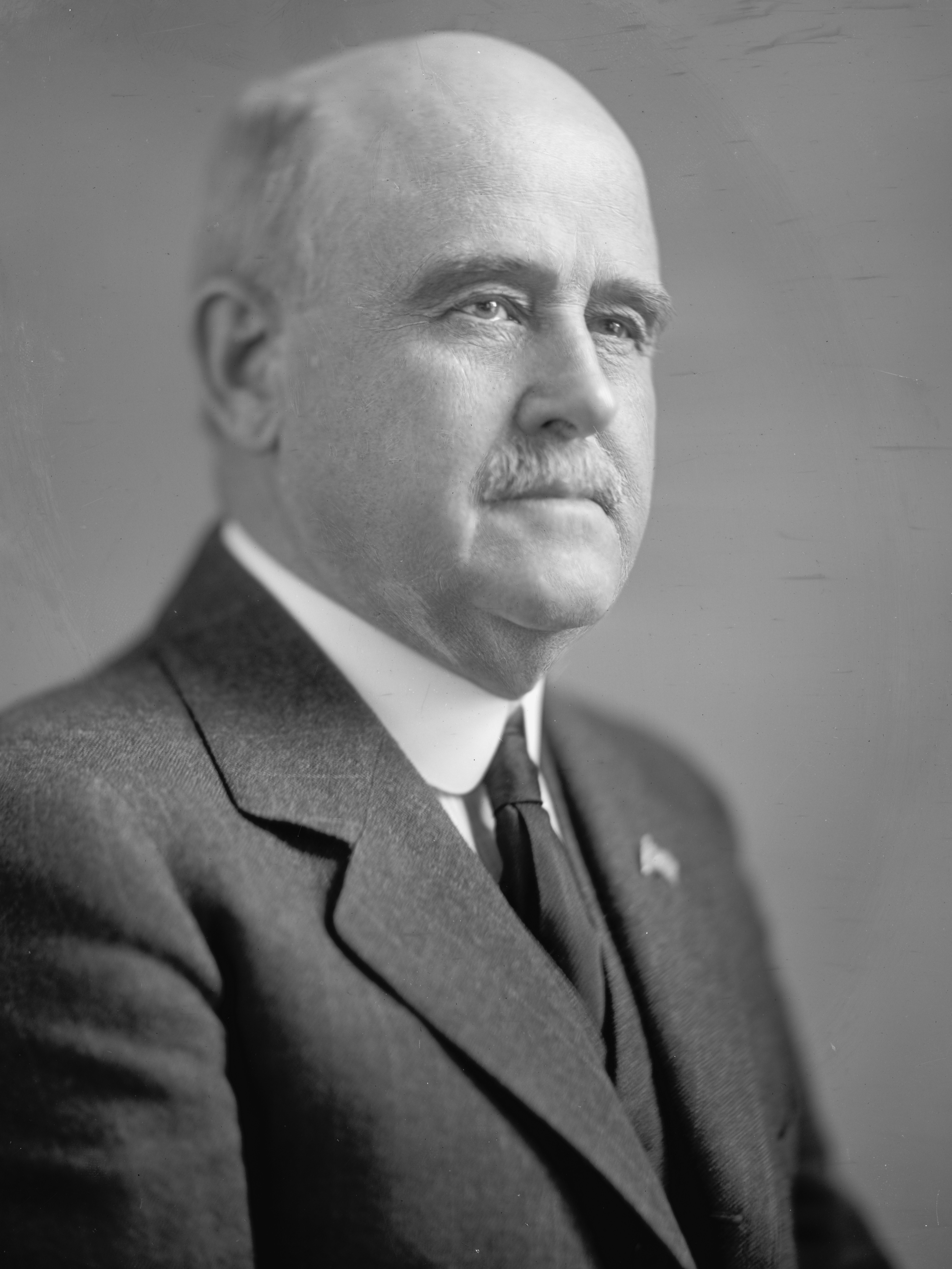
- McKinley, 1905–1926

United States Senator from Illinois
- In office March 4, 1921 – December 7, 1926
- Preceded by: Lawrence Yates Sherman
- Succeeded by: Otis F. Glenn

Member of the U.S. House of Representatives from Illinois's 19th district
- In office March 4, 1915 – March 3, 1921
- Preceded by: Charles M. Borchers
- Succeeded by: Allen F. Moore
- In office March 4, 1905 – March 3, 1913
- Preceded by: Vespasian Warner
- Succeeded by: Charles M. Borchers

Personal details
- Born: September 5, 1856 Petersburg, Illinois, U.S.
- Died: December 7, 1926 (aged 70) Martinsville, Indiana, U.S.
- Party: Republican
- Education: University of Illinois

William Brown McKinley (September 5, 1856 – December 7, 1926) was an American banker and Republican politician who represented the state of Illinois in the United States House of Representatives for seven terms (1905–1913, 1915–1921) and in the United States Senate for one term from 1921 to 1926.

He also served as national campaign manager for President William Howard Taft's re-election bid in 1912, securing Taft's nomination by the Republican National Convention.

== Biography ==
William Brown McKinley was born on September 5, 1856, near Petersburg, Illinois.

After attending the University of Illinois at Urbana-Champaign for two years, in around 1875 McKinley worked as a drug-store clerk in Springfield. He soon returned to Champaign to become a banker, specializing in farm mortgages. He entered politics in 1902, being elected a trustee of the University of Illinois. McKinley ran for the U.S. House of Representatives in 1904, winning his first of four consecutive terms. He lost re-election to the House in 1912. His re-election loss coincided with his service as national campaign manager for incumbent President William H. Taft, who also lost in 1912.

Voters in 1914 returned McKinley to the U.S. House, where he served from 1915 until 1921. In 1920, McKinley was elected to the U.S. Senate, taking office in 1921. In 1926, he ran for re-election and lost to Frank L. Smith (who ultimately was denied the seat by the Senate on the grounds of fraud and corruption in his campaign).

McKinley also was chief executive of the Illinois Traction System, an interurban electric railway. The McKinley Bridge between Venice, Illinois and St. Louis, Missouri was named for him. The McKinley Health Center at the University of Illinois at Urbana-Champaign is also named for him. McKinley died aged 70 in Martinsville, Indiana.

== See also ==
- List of members of the United States Congress who died in office (1900–1949)

Party political offices
Preceded by Lawrence Yates Sherman	Republican nominee for U.S. Senator from Illinois (Class 3); 1920	Succeeded by Frank L. Smith
U.S. House of Representatives
Preceded by Vespasian Warner	Member of the U.S. House of Representatives from Illinois's 19th congressional district 1905–1913	Succeeded by Charles M. Borchers
Preceded by Charles M. Borchers	Member of the U.S. House of Representatives from Illinois's 19th congressional district 1915–1921	Succeeded by Allen F. Moore
U.S. Senate
Preceded by Lawrence Yates Sherman	U.S. senator (Class 3) from Illinois; 1921–1926; Served alongside: Joseph M. McCormick, Charles S. Deneen	Succeeded by Frank L. Smith (not allowed to take his seat)
