= Frank L. Smith =

American politician (1867–1950)

Frank Smith
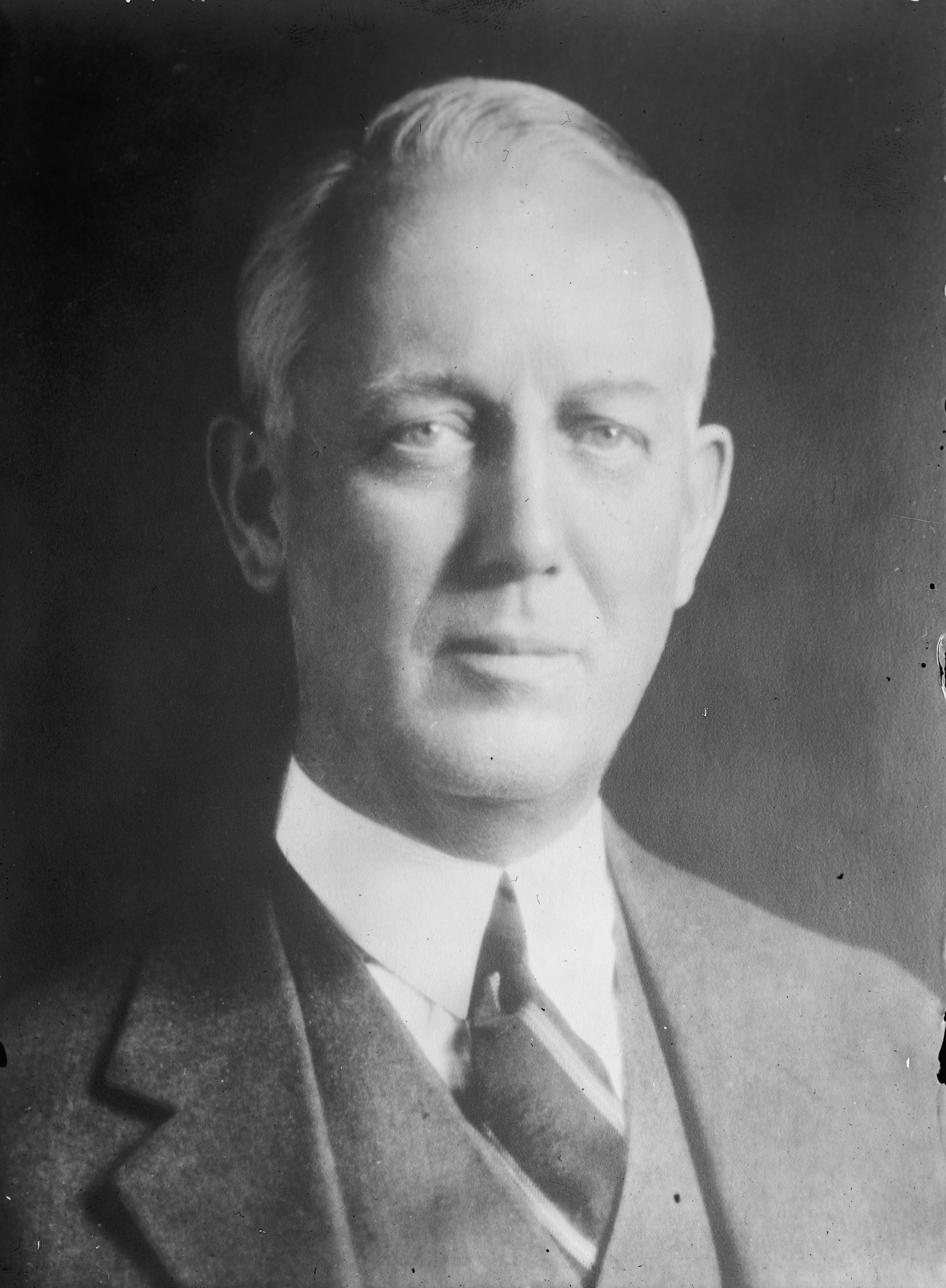

United States Senator-elect from Illinois
- In office Not seated
- Preceded by: William B. McKinley
- Succeeded by: Otis F. Glenn

Member of the U.S. House of Representatives from Illinois's 17th district
- In office March 4, 1919 – March 3, 1921
- Preceded by: John Allen Sterling
- Succeeded by: Frank H. Funk

Personal details
- Born: Frank Leslie Smith; November 24, 1867 Dwight, Illinois, U.S.
- Died: August 30, 1950 (aged 82) Dwight, Illinois, U.S.
- Party: Republican

Frank Leslie Smith (November 24, 1867 – August 30, 1950) was an American politician who served as the U.S. representative for Illinois's 17th congressional district from 1919 to 1921 as a member of the Republican Party.

== Biography ==
Smith was born in Dwight, Illinois on November 24, 1867. He was raised and educated in Dwight, then taught school for several years. Smith then embarked on a business career, and his interests included farming, banking, and real estate. Smith served in local office, including Dwight's village clerk in 1894. In 1904, he was an unsuccessful Republican candidate for lieutenant governor. From 1905 to 1906, he was a federal internal revenue collector for the district that included Dwight. In 1918, he was a successful candidate for the United States House of Representatives, and he served one term, March 4, 1919 to March 3, 1921.

== Career ==
Smith first ran for the Republican primary nomination for the U.S. Senate in 1920. In that first year of suffrage, women's votes were counted separately from men's in Illinois. He was beating William B. McKinley by 27,000 votes after the male votes were counted, but once the female votes were counted, McKinley had won by 11,000 votes. McKinley went on to win the general election as well. In 1921, Smith became the chairman of the Illinois Commerce Commission, which oversaw utilities in the state.

In 1926, Smith defeated McKinley in the Republican primary for the Senate. Smith went on to win the general election held in November, although Julius Rosenwald of Sears, Roebuck & Company had offered him $550,000 in stock to withdraw. Senate investigators subsequently accused Smith of exceeding allowable limits by spending more than $400,000 on his campaign, including $125,000 from utilities that had business before the commerce commission while Smith was a member.

McKinley's term was due to expire in March 1927. He died in December 1926, and Illinois Governor Len Small (R) appointed Smith to fill the vacancy. When Smith presented his credentials, the U.S. Senate voted not to seat him, based upon the alleged fraud and corruption. In March 1927, he again attempted to qualify, based on the results of the November 1926 election, but the senate again declined to seat him. After the seat had been vacant for more than two years, Smith resigned on February 9, 1928.

== See also ==
- Frank L. Smith Bank
- Frank L. Smith | Society for American Baseball Research Biography
- Unseated members of the United States Congress

U.S. House of Representatives
Preceded by John Sterling	Member of the U.S. House of Representatives from Illinois's 17th congressional district 1919–1921	Succeeded by Frank H. Funk
Party political offices
Preceded by William B. McKinley	Republican nominee for U.S. Senator from Illinois (Class 3); 1926	Succeeded by Otis F. Glenn
U.S. Senate
Preceded by William B. McKinley	U.S. Senator-elect (Class 3) from Illinois; 1926–1928; Served alongside: Charles S. Deneen	Succeeded by Otis F. Glenn
