= Mitch Johnson (disambiguation) =

Mitch Johnson is an American basketball coach. Mitch or Mitchell Johnson may also refer to:

- Mitch Johnson (American football) (born 1942), American football player
- Mitchell Johnson, Australian former cricketer
- Mitchell Scott Johnson (born 1984), one of the juvenile perpetrators of the Westside School shooting
- Paperboy (rapper) (Mitchell Charles Johnson, born 1969), American rapper
