= James F. Redmond =

18th Superintendent of Chicago Public Schools
- In office October 3, 1966 – July 31, 1975
- Preceded by: Benjamin Willis; Thaddeus Lubera (interim)
- Succeeded by: Joseph P. Hannon

Superintendent of Syosset Central School District
- In office 1963–1966

Superintendent of New Orleans Public Schools
- In office 1953–1961

Personal details
- Born: September 13, 1915 Kansas City, Missouri
- Died: March 21, 1993 (aged 77) La Grange, Illinois
- Spouse: Mary Edith Adams (m. 1939)
- Children: 1
- Education: Columbia University

James Francis Redmond (September 13, 1915 – March 21, 1993) was an educator who served as superintendent of Chicago Public Schools, superintendent of New Orleans Public Schools, and superintendent of Syosset Central School District.

== Early life and education ==
Redmond was born September 13, 1915, in Kansas City, Missouri, to James Timothy Redmond and Gertrude Shwarz Redmond. Redmond grew up in Kansas City, Missouri. He attended public schools there, including Central High School, where he was an ROTC cadet captain. He earned awards as a cadet captain. Redmond served as a cadet colonel in the Citizens' Military Training Camp program at Fort Leavenworth, where he also won awards, including the 1937 Pershing medal, naming him the outstanding CMTC trainee in the Seventh corps area. Redmond wanted to become a lawyer, however he abandoned these ambitions due to the financial struggles his family was enduring amid the Great Depression making him unable to attend law school. He instead pursued teacher training, for which he was able to receive financial assistance through a federal grant, which paid his entire cost of tuition ($18.75 per quarter) Redmond attended the Kansas City Teachers College for two years before getting his first teaching job in 1935. After this, he continued to study there, until earning his Bachelor of Arts degree in 1937. Later attending classes at Columbia University during the summers of 1939 and 1940, he received a Master of Arts in education there in 1940. He later received a Doctor of Education from Columbia University in 1948. His dissertation was titled "Administrative Factors Affecting Teacher Strikes". Among those on the dissertation committee was George Counts. He later attended classes at Northwestern University to take classes on purchasing in the mid-1940s, after becoming head of the Chicago Public Schools' purchasing department.

== Career ==
In 1935, he accepted a job as an elementary school teacher. During the 1935–1936 school year, he taught sixth grade at Kansas City's Van Horn School, and in the 1938–39 school year he taught at the city's William Rockhill Nelson School and E.C. White School. In 1940, he became assistant superintendent of Kansas City Public Schools, serving under Superintendent Herold C. Hunt. Hunt, who had known Redmond since he first interviewed to become a teacher in the school district, was a mentor to Redmond. From 1942 through 1945, amid World War II, Redmond took a three-and-one-half year military leave to serve in the United States Army, in which he advanced in classification from second lieutenant to lieutenant colonel, serving as an assignment officer in the Adjunct General's Department at the Camp Wolters infantry center. His roles included overseeing the testing of soldiers, assigning men to specialty training based on their test results, and assigning soldiers according to unit needs. After World War II ended, Redmond returned to his position as assistant superintendent. However, he only served in this position for six months before he took an additional leave to pursue a doctorate at Columbia University. During his time studying at Columbia University, he was selected to serve as the principal of the Horrace Mann-Lincoln School, which was run by Columbia University on its campus. The school was to close after his term in the position, so Redmond was tasked with overseeing its closure in a manner that minimized disruptions to students and faculty, and also with helping faculty find new jobs. His tenure ended at the completion of the 1948 school year.

=== First tenure with Chicago Public Schools ===
Redmond then moved to again work with Herold C. Hunt, who was now the superintendent of Chicago Public Schools. Redmond was made first assistant superintendent of Chicago Public Schools. Hunt had made a deal with the Chicago Board of Education in 1947, when he accepted the super intendency, that they would allow him to make Redmond his assistant superintendent once Redmond finished his doctoral studies. As assistant superintendent, Redmond oversaw the Bureau of School Clerks, Bureau of Lunchrooms, and Public Relations Department. Redmond, after two years with Chicago Public Schools, was made director of purchasing, the lead purchasing agent for Chicago Public Schools, and of the school district's purchasing department. Hunt had assigned Redmond to this position after issues had arisen in the department. Redmond enrolled in classes on purchasing at Northwestern University to better understand the subject. At Northwestern he met competent individuals who he hired as assistants to help reorganize the school district's purchasing department. Redmond would serve four years as the head of the purchasing department, before taking the job of superintendent in New Orleans. Redmond received national recognition in the educating community for his work in enhancing school administration in Chicago.

=== Superintendent of New Orleans Public Schools ===
On February 21, 1953, the Orleans Parish School Board hired Redmond to serve as New Orleans' school superintendent. He was hired to serve a one-month unexpired term, and a 4-year full term thereafter, taking office on June 1, 1953. While Chicago attempted to retain him by offering him more money than New Orleans had agreed to pay him, he refused to back away from his oral acceptance of the New Orleans superintendent's post. There was even consideration of appointing Redmond as Hunt's successor in the role of superintendent of Chicago Public Schools. During his tenure, in November 1958, a powerful homemade bomb was exploded in front of his private parking spot at the central administrative offices of the school board.

==== Desegregation ====
Early into his tenure in New Orleans, the 1954 Brown v. Board of Education decision saw the Supreme Court of the United States order school districts to cease racial segregation in their schools. Some anticipated that New Orleans could lead the nation in peaceful desegregation, as the city had seen relative racial harmony, was less residentially segregated than most American cities, had added African Americans to its police force, and had desegregated its public libraries, its buses, and its recreational facilities. There was a very strong sentiment in New Orleans against racial integration of schools. In February 1959, an article in The New Republic brought to many people's attention that no organized effort had arisen to integrate the schools in New Orleans. After this, some activists organized to form the group Save Our Schools, Inc. to support integration. Redmond would ultimately implement integration in New Orleans, but not without first fighting it.

A local lawsuit (Bush v. Orleans Parish School Board) was filed in 1956 in the United States District Court for the Eastern District of Louisiana. Judge J. Skelly Wright, on February 15, 1956, enjoined the Orleans school board from requiring and permitting racial segregation, directing them to, "make arrangements for admission of children...on a racially nondiscriminatory basis with all deliberate speed". Redmond decided that it was necessary to mount a vigorous legal battle against desegregation. Between 1956 and 1959, the school district pursued cases which made it to the United States Court of Appeals and the Supreme Court of the United States, both of which upheld Judge Wright's decision. On July 15, 1959, Judge Wright ordered that the Orleans Parish School Board to file a desegregation plan by March 1, 1960, later extending the date May 16, 1960, at the board's request. On May 16, 1960, the board told the court that it had no desegregation plan, and Judge Wright provided them with a plan of his own which ordered the desegregation of all first grades at the start of the new school year that September. On August 31, 1960, members of the school board requested a delay in integration to allow more time to prepare a plan, which was granted, moving the slated date of the start of desegregation to November 14, 1960. Redmond thereafter prepared a plan, which he presented to Judge Wright, who approved the plan and ordered Redmond and the school board to implement it. The plan was designed to put some African-American children in White schools. There was pressure by outside individuals and some members of the school board to convince Redmond and the rest of the school board to look for schools where White parents and students would be more accepting of African-American students, as well as find African-American students who would best fit in at White schools. They rejected this suggestion, arguing that it would be too subjective a criteria, and opting instead to use a "scientific" method which instead wound up choosing the schools which appeared most ill-welcoming of integration. On September 26, 1960, the school board formally announced their integration plan. To delay the integration of the schools even further, Redmond ordered the principals of the two integrated public schools to close their schools on November 14, 1960, providing Governor of Louisiana Jimmie Davis and the Louisiana State Legislature with time to propose 30 bills that would make integration illegal, even though Wright had already declared most of the bills unconstitutional. This triggered the New Orleans school desegregation crisis. Less than 24 hours later, the U.S. Court of Appeals for the Fifth Circuit ruled all 30 bills unconstitutional. On November 14, the school system was officially desegregated. On November 15, 1960, in a special session, the Louisiana State Legislature took numerous actions to try to prevent the school board from pursuing integration, including attempting dismantle the school board, and fire Redmond. The State Legislature would try seven times to fire Redmond, each time having federal district courts invalidate these firings.

=== Work at Booz Allen Hamilton Management ===
In February 1961, Redmond announced he did not plan to renew his contract with the school district in New Orleans, which was to expire on July 1, 1961, at which point he intended to leave. Redmond left New Orleans that year. He moved to New York, where he was hired as a director of school administration services by Booz Allen Hamilton Management. He held this position for two years.

=== Superintendent of Syosset Central School District ===
In 1963, Redmond was hired to become superintendent of the Syosset Central School District. He left this job in 1966 to return to Chicago.

=== Superintendent of Chicago Public Schools ===
On October 3, 1966, Redmond assumed office as superintendent of Chicago Public Schools. Since Benjamin Willis had resigned effective August 31, but Redmond could not leave his post in Syosset before October 3, the Chicago Board of Education appointed an interim superintendent, Thaddeus Lubera, for the intervening days between their tenures. Upon taking the job, Redmond declared that he was setting out to prove that Chicago's, "big-city school system is not doomed to failure." Redmond was greeted by critics of his predecessor, Willis, with "cautious optimism".

==== Budget issues ====
Redmond, upon assuming the office of superintendent in October 1966, faced challenges preparing the 1967 budget. Additionally, he had to address a $5 million deficit in the 1966 budget.

=== Chicago Teachers Union negotiations and strikes ===
Redmond and the Chicago Board of Education needed to negotiate annual contracts with the Chicago Teachers Union. A recurrent issue was the school district lacking sufficient funds to meet the demands of the union. The Chicago Board of Education found itself regularly requesting additional funding from the state of Illinois. Multiple times, Mayor of Chicago Richard J. Daley intervened in the process, to Redmond's chagrin. Daley would give the Union what they wanted, and promise he would help the Chicago Board of Education receive additional funding. Daley would not always be follow through on his promises of additional funding, however. Redmond, after taking office, worked on contract negotiations for the following year's contract with the Chicago Teachers Union. A teachers' strike nearly occurred, but was averted after Mayor Daley helped reach a deal for a new contract. Daley intervened again in 1968 following year to reach another contract and avert a strike.

Between late 1968 and early 1969, Redmond again contracted a negotiated a contract with the union. An interim, agreement was reached in January 1969, while negotiations continued. Amid stalled negotiations, the first-ever teachers' strike in the city's history was initiated on May 22, 1969, with almost 18,600 teachers participating. The strike ended May 26, 1969, after intervention by Mayor Daley and Governor of Illinois Richard B. Ogilvie succeeded in reaching an agreement. However, by the middle of the summer of 1969, it became evident that the Chicago Board of Education would struggle to financially hold its contractual obligations. A union's representative body initially voted to hold a strike. On August 28, 1969, due to new money being made available, the Chicago Board of Education agreed that it would implement it 1969 contract to a degree that satisfied the union, averting a second strike. In 1970, contract negotiations for the following year were far less difficult. Budget cuts in other areas were made to meet the union's demands. During negotiations for the 1972 contract, a teachers' strike was threatened numerous times. Negotiations for the 1973 contract led to a sixteen-day strike in January 1973. Since the Chicago Board of Education was realigning its fiscal year to align with the school year, the 1974 contract was only for eight months, and was agreed to without the threat of a strike. The contract for the 1974–75 school year also occurred without the threat of a strike.

==== Desegregation issue ====
After prompting from the United States Department of Health, Education, and Welfare in January 1967, Redmond developed a document titled Increasing Desegregation of Faculties, Students, and Vocational Education Programs. This document, most commonly referred to as "The Redmond Plan", was accepted "in principle" by the Chicago Board of Education on August 23, 1967, by a 10–0 vote (with one abstention). The plan saw mixed public reception. The plan was praised by the editorial board of the Chicago Sun-Times, who hailed it as, "an educational Burnham Plan for Chicago, a proposal for experimentation and innovation in keeping with the needs of modern urban living." The editorial board of the Chicago Tribune, contrarily, rejected the proposal's ideas. In August 1968, Redmond testified before the Illinois Senate that he believed desegregation busing to be vital to increase integration in the city's schools. He also told the subcommittee he was testifying before that he believed that integration was "imperative", declaring, "we live in a multicultural and multi-racial society, and if we are to ease tensions, it is imperative that a course of integration be followed." Redmond decided to employ the creation magnet schools in the district as a means to provide a short-term partial remedy to segregation in the district. The first of these magnet schools Robert Black Elementary, began teaching students in September 1968.

==== Resignation ====
In 1975, Redmond retired, stepping down as superintendent. A Chicago Tribune article declared that his departure occurred, "amid charges from many quarters that Chicago's public schools failed under his administration."

== Later career, Personal life and death ==
Redmond moved to Benton Harbor, Michigan, working as a management consultant for the international accounting firm Coopers & Lybrand.\ Redmond later moved to La Grange Park, Illinois. Redmond married Mary Edith Redmond (née Adams) on June 3, 1939. Together they had one son, James Leonard Redmond. Redmond died at the age of 77 on March 21, 1993, at La Grange Memorial Hospital in La Grange, Illinois.
