= Argie Johnson =

American educator and biochemist

23rd Superintendent of Chicago Public Schools
- In office August 9, 1993 – July 10, 1995
- Preceded by: Ted Kimbrough; Richard Stephenson (interim)
- Succeeded by: Paul Vallas (CEO)

Personal details
- Born: January 28, 1939 (age 87) Kannapolis, North Carolina
- Children: 1
- Profession: Educator; biochemist

Argie K. Johnson (born January 28, 1939) is an American educator and biochemist who served as superintendent of Chicago Public Schools and deputy chancellor of New York Public Schools. Johnson is recognized as the fourth African American-and the second African American woman—to lead the Chicago Public Schools, following Ruth B. Love, who was the first African American woman to hold the position.

== Early life and education ==
Johnson hails from Kannapolis, North Carolina. She was the eldest of six children born to sharecroppers. She worked her way through college.

== Career ==
Johnson was originally a biochemist.

=== New York Public Schools ===
Johnson, in 1967, began working for New York Public Schools as a science teacher, in order to financially support her daughter as a single mother. She later rose to become a school principal of David Riggles Junior High School 258 in 1978, which was regarded as a low-achieving school with a crime problem. She held this position for seven years, and school officials stated that test scores rose by as much as 20% during her tenure (although they still fell below the national averages). By the time she left, the school had a waiting list. She was credited with repairing the schools image. She then served as a subdistrict superintendent. She rose to serve as the deputy chancellor of the New York Public Schools system, making her the second-in command of the largest school district in the United States. Upon entering the job, she faced controversy as deputy chancellor when she was quickly tasked by chancellor Joseph A. Fernandez with "toning down" the "Children of the Rainbow" curriculum, which sought to teach children to be accepting towards homosexuality and other "alternative lifestyles". The "Children of the Rainbow" curriculum had become nationally controversial. In part, due to her involvement with this controversy, her tenure as deputy chancellor was set to end before 1994, after only two years on the job, with the school board opting not to renew her contract. Despite this, Johnson's leadership performance in New York was overall well-regarded. She was also being considered as Fernandez's possible replacement.

=== Superintendent of Chicago Public Schools ===
In June 1993, she was hired to serve as the superintendent of Chicago Public Schools, placing her in charge of the third-largest school district in the United States. The Chicago Board of Education voted to hire her by a unanimous vote. She was the district's sixth permanent superintendent in a less than two-decade period. She was the second African-American woman to hold the position, after Ruth B. Love. She signed a three-year contract with the district. Her tenure formally began on August 9, 1993. In 1995, after the district was reformed with mayoral control of schools, she was ousted. She had originally been hired by the Chicago Board of Education, in part, due to her enthusiasm for the "decentralization" scheme of Chicago schools which this reorganization undid. She was replaced in July 1995 by Paul Vallas, who was named to the new position of "CEO" of Chicago Public Schools.
