= Centennial High School (Compton, California) =

Public high school in California, United States

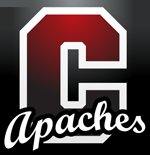

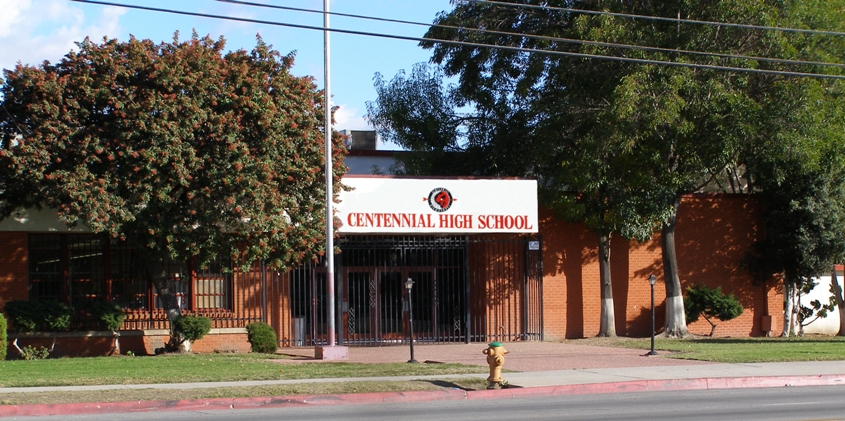

Location
- 2606 North Central Avenue; Compton, California 90222; 33.91556°N 118.2527°W

Information
- Type: Public high school
- Established: 1954
- School district: Compton Unified School District
- Principal: Bobby Walker
- Faculty: 44.44 (FTE)
- Grades: 9-12
- Enrollment: 968 (2023–2024)
- Student to teacher ratio: 21.78
- Campus: Urban
- Colors: Scarlet; White
- Athletics conference: CIF Southern Section; Ocean League
- Nickname: The Ten, Big-10
- Team name: Apaches
- Newspaper: Apache Signal
- Yearbook: War Cry
- Website: Centennial HS

Centennial High School is a public high school in Compton, California, operating as part of the Compton Unified School District.

Construction of Centennial High School began in 1953, and it was erected in 1954, with its first graduating class in 1954. It is the smallest of the three high schools in the Compton Unified School District, which also includes Compton High School and Manuel Dominguez High School.

== Student population and demographics ==
Approximately 1,370 students attend Centennial High School.

- 9th Grade: 450
- 10th Grade: 329
- 11th Grade: 319
- 12th Grade: 272

The ethnic composition of the student body is:

- 64% Latino
- 33% African-American
- 1% Two or more races
- 2% Other, multiple, declined to state, or non-response.

Students speak English and/or Spanish. 48% of the students are Second-Language Learners (SLL) with 33% of the total enrollment classified as Limited English Proficiency (LEP).

Special Education students comprise 11% of the total enrollment. Of this, 5% are identified as Resource Specialist Program (RSP) and 6% as Special Day Class (SDC).

All students in attendance qualify for the National School Lunch Program receiving free or reduced breakfast and lunch.

=== Certificated staff profile ===
The certificated staff and faculty at Centennial High School is ethnically composed of the following as of 2009:

- 43% African-American
- 1% American Indian or Alaska Native
- 6% Asian
- 27% Caucasian
- 3% Filipino
- 11% Latino
- 1% Pacific Islander
- 7% Multiple or No Response.

The California Department of Education mandates a qualification for subject teaching known as a "Clear Credential". 91% of certificated staff hold a Clear Credential and all except for five staff members met the No Child Left Behind Act (NCLB) requirements of "Highly Qualified Teacher".

== Academics ==
The school offers eleven Advanced Placement courses.

=== Accountability Progress Reporting (APR) 2009–2010 CDOE ===
Centennial High School is designated by the Compton Unified School District as a Title I school. For over 5 years, the school has remained a Program Improvement (PI) school. As of the 2009-2010 school year, Centennial is in state rank 1 and also ranks 1 with similar schools.

Centennial High School has not met its state-identified goals for student progress in all areas each year since 2006. Students failed to meet the No Child Left Behind Act's Adequate Yearly Progress (AYP) requirements in English Language Arts (ELA) or Mathematics for all significant subgroups. Centennial remains in year 5+ of school-wide Program Improvement (PI).

==== 2010 data ====
- CAHSEE English Language Arts (ELA): In 2010, of 270 sophomores, 177 passed the ELA examination, or 66%. Of this number, 52 of 82 African-American students passed, or 63%. 122 of 182 Latino students passed, or 67%.
- CAHSEE Mathematics: In 2010, of 275 sophomores, 163 passed the Math examination, or 59%. Of this number, 43 of 83 African-American students passed, or 52%. 116 of 185 Latino students passed, or 63%.
- California Standardized Testing and Reporting (STAR) Program: California requires a minimum Academic Performance Index (API) score of at least 650. As of 2010, Centennial High School's API was 573, well below the statewide performance target of 800. Test scores indicate that the vast majority of students are not proficient or advanced and many of them are far below grade level in all core academic areas.

=== Graduation rate ===
Identified as a Tier 1 school in the Spring of 2010 by the California Department of Education (CDOE), Centennial High School had a standing graduation rate of 58.9% and since then has been reclassified as a “persistently low-achieving school” by the Assessment and Accountability Division, with graduation rates below 60% for three years or more. California State and Federal Government guidelines for high school graduation rates dictate that all schools should be at 83%, or grow .01% over the past year or .02% over the past 2 years. Currently, the graduation rate at Centennial High School is 58.9%. Therefore, Centennial has chosen the "Transformation Intervention Model" in an effort to increase retention of students, student achievement and the site’s graduation rate.

== Sports ==
The Centennial Apaches compete in the Bay League of the California Interscholastic Federation (CIF).

== Notable alumni ==
- Arron Afflalo (Class of 2004), basketball player
- Larry Allen, former NFL player (transferred before graduating)
- Brittany Barber (Class of 2004), Singer/ Songwriter
- Big Fase 100, rapper
- Omar Bradley (Class of 1976; voted "Mr. Apache" in senior class poll), mayor of Compton (1993-2001)
- Deonte Burton (Class of 2010), basketball player
- Carson Conklin (Class of 2023), college football quarterback for the Sacramento State Hornets
- Ken Dennis, Masters world record sprinter
- Dr. Dre, music executive, record producer, & rapper
- Charles Dumas, high jumper
- Allan Ellis, former NFL player
- Donte Gamble, former CFL player
- Floyd Hodge (Class of 1977) former NFL player Atlanta Falcons
- Mitch Johnson, former NFL player
- Kendrick Lamar (Class of 2005), rapper & record producer
- Paul Lowe, former NFL player
- Don Wilson (baseball) (Class of 1963), former Major League Baseball pitcher for the Houston Astros
- Lenny Randle (Class of 1967), former Major League Baseball {MLB} player
- Reggie Smith, baseball player
- Wayne Simpson, former Major League Baseball pitcher
- Bobby Thompson, former NFL player
- Frank K. Wheaton (Class of 1969; senior class president), sports agent
- Roy White (Class of 1961), baseball player
