= Joseph P. Hannon =

American educator and superintendent (1932–2019)

- Hannon speaks to reporters outside his CPS office, August 1977.

CEO and Managing Director of the Metropolitan Fair and Exposition Authority
- In office 1981–1988

19th Superintendent of Chicago Public Schools
- In office August 1975 – November 1979
- Preceded by: James F. Redmond
- Succeeded by: Ruth B. Love; Angeline Caruso (interim)

Personal details
- Born: Joseph Perrault Hannon; September 24, 1932 Fitchburg, Massachusetts
- Died: August 9, 2019 (aged 86) Chicago, Illinois
- Spouse: Denise R. Turcotte
- Education: Fitchburg State University

Joseph Perrault Hannon (September 24, 1932 – August 9, 2019) was an American educator and administrator who served as superintendent of Chicago Public Schools from August 1975 to November 1979. He was later was CEO of the Metropolitan Fair and Exposition Authority, executive director of the Illinois Export Development Authority, and vice president of the Chicago Stock Exchange.

== Early life and education ==
Hannon was born in Fitchburg, Massachusetts. His father, Philip A. Hannon, was a city councilor in Fitchburg. He attended Fitchburg High School, where he graduated in 1951. In high school, he won state and New England titles in track. Hannon was the 1951 New England and Massachusetts broad jump champion and placed second in the 100 yard dash at the 1951 Massachusetts state meet. He also played American football. A year after graduating high school, he received an additional diploma from Worcester Academy. Hannon won the National Preparatory School indoor broad jump title in 1952 at Madison Square Garden. He then attended college at Lafayette College, before joining the United States Marine Corps. Hannon served two years in the Marine Corps as a swimming instructor. After this, he received a bachelor's degree in 1959 from Fitchburg State University. During college, he served as the head track coach at Fitchburg High School.

== Early career ==
Hannon worked as a high school history teacher and an assistant principal at Nantucket High School, prior to leaving the United States in 1964. After leaving the United States he taught in private American schools in Austria and Greece. He eventually became assistant director at the American International School of Vienna. By 1970, he was a graduate assistant at the University of Northern Colorado.

== Chicago Public Schools ==
=== Superintendency ===
In July 1975, the Chicago Board of Education voted 7–4 to promote Hannon to the position of superintendent of Chicago Public Schools. The selection of Hannon over Manford Byrd Jr. was controversial. In his first year on the job, Hannon dealt with budget issues and a teachers strike that had begun before he took office. Mayor Richard J. Daley managed to resolve the three-week strike by ordering the Chicago Board of Education to provide the teachers with the money they were demanding, despite Hannon insisting that such money was not available within the school district's constrained budget. The strike ended four days after Hannon took office. Hannon inherited a $50 million school district deficit. Additionally, the United States Department of Health, Education, and Welfare had threatened to revoke up to $100 million in federal funding to Chicago Public Schools due to the failure of the district to racially integrate its faculty. The district also faced massive challenges in student integration, lacking a viable path. Reading test scores for the district were also low when he took office.

Hannon was a supporter of magnet schools, and Whitney M. Young Magnet High School was opened during his tenure. During his tenure, the federal government ruled that the Chicago Public Schools were racially segregated. Hannon presented a plan for desegregation to the federal government, which they rejected. Ultimately, Chicago Public Schools would not desegregate until 1980. In July 1979, the Chicago Board of Education voted to give Hannon a second four-year term as superintendent. However, in November 1979, he resigned abruptly. When he left, the district's finances were still in trouble, with the Chicago Tribune describing it as being "virtually broke."

== Later career ==
In 1981, Hannon was named managing director and CEO of the Metropolitan Fair and Exposition Authority (MFEA) and president of the Chicago Convention and Tourism Bureau (CCTB). In March 1983, the MFEA voted to renew his contract and raise his salary to $47,500. His pay for the secondary role as president of the CCTB was raised from $45,000 to $52,000, giving him an annual combined salary of $100,000. Later in 1983, he was forced to resign as head of the MFEA due to increasing criticism over a $60 million cost overrun in the expansion of McCormick Place and questions about a personal loan from a bank controlled by the owner of the McCormick Center Hotel. In 1988, he was appointed head of the Export Development Authority. Following his tenure in this role, he worked as the executive vice president of the World Trade Center Chicago Association. In 1994, he was appointed to be one of the vice presidents of the Chicago Stock Exchange. In 1996, he began working as director of education and an executive vice president at Everett Securities. Governor George Ryan appointed Hannon to serve as a managing director for the Illinois Department of Commerce and the Community Affairs' Illinois Trade Office. He held this role until early 2003. While in this job, he led three missions to Cuba on Ryan's behalf.

== Personal life and death ==
Hannon and his wife Denise R. Hannon (née Turcotte) were married for nearly 60 years, up until his death. His wife had also worked as a teacher. Hannon died of heart failure on August 9, 2019 at his personal residence in the Gold Coast neighborhood of Chicago.

== Select journal articles authored ==
- Hannon, Joseph P. (October 31, 1979). "The Chicago Plan: Mastery Learning in the Chicago Public Schools". Educational Leadership. 37 (2).
