= Distance education in Chicago Public Schools in 1937 =

Large-scale program that provided at-home distance education in Chicago in 1937

In September 1937, amid a polio outbreak in Chicago, Chicago Public Schools undertook a pioneering large-scale program that provided at-home distance education to the city's elementary school students through lessons transmitted by radio broadcasts and materials published in newspapers. This took place under the leadership of William Johnson, the superintendent of Chicago Public Schools. Johnson received praise from the efforts. However, analysis observed shortcomings in the provision of instruction via the format of radio. Renewed attention was given to Chicago's 1937 remote education in the early 2020s, with many articles highlighting it as a precursor to the use of communication technology to provide educational instruction during the COVID-19 pandemic.

== Polio outbreak in Chicago ==
In 1937, Chicago was hit by a polio outbreak. On August 31, the Chicago Board of Health, led by Herman Bundesen, ordered an indefinite postponement of the opening of schools, which had been scheduled to begin their fall semesters on September 7. President of the Chicago Board of Education James B. McCahey announced on September 2 that schools would remain "indefinitely closed". For elementary schools, closures ultimately lasted three weeks.

== Distance education program ==
In order to provide elementary school students with instruction during the indefinite school closures, William Johnson (superintendent of Chicago Public Schools) and Minnie Fallon (assistant superintendent in charge of elementary schools) developed a distance learning program that provided the students in grades three through eight with instruction via radio broadcasts. Distance learning instruction was, ultimately, broadcast for two weeks, beginning on September 13, 1937. Elementary schools reopened for in-person instruction on September 27. On September 11, a special broadcast was aired, in which Johnson and August H. Pritzlaff (the district's director of physical education) outlined the plan for radio lessons, and Bundesen explained the public health rationale for school closures and instructed parents on how to recognize the signs of polio-inflicted infantile paralysis. Later that morning, a broadcast was aired, in which a former president of the Illinois Congress of Parents and Teachers urged mothers to join their children in listening to the broadcasts so that they could discuss the lessons with their children.

Chicago's experiment with daily broadcasts of its curriculum attracted the interest of educators across the United States. The idea of using radio to facilitate distance learning was considered innovative and largely untested. Out-of-city newspapers sent correspondents to Chicago to report on it, and newsreels were created that reported on Chicago's experiment in mass distance education by radio.

Fallon cited a belief that children in the first and second elementary school grades requiring more individual attention and not being as adaptable to distance education was the reason that those grades were not provided with such instruction. Johnson cited a lack of enough radio air time as the reason that high school students were not part of the program either. Johnson recommended that high school students spend the period of the school closures reviewing their notebooks from their previous semester of school. High schools would ultimately be closed for a shorter period than elementary schools, returning to in-person instruction on September 16, a day after the Chicago Board of Health determined that it was safe for high schools to reopen but still unsafe for elementary schools to do the same.

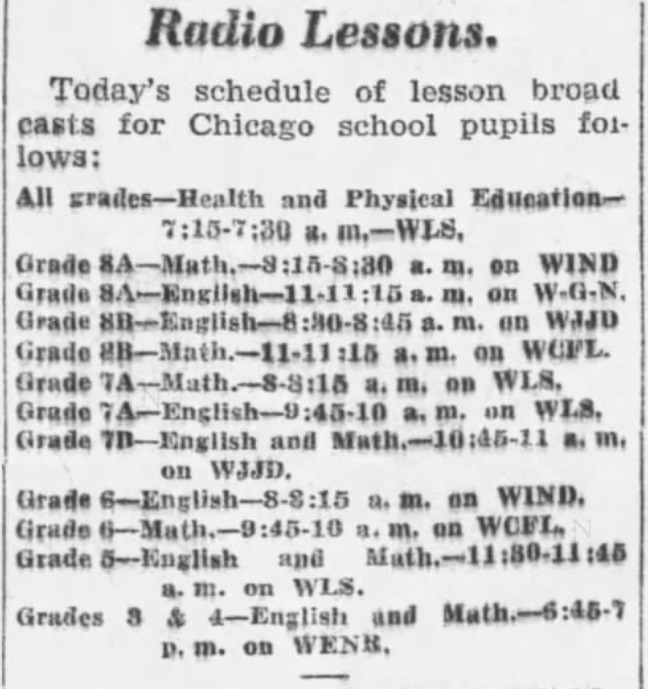
Schedule for September 16, as printed in the Chicago Tribune

Lessons were presented in 15-minute slots of airtime. Airtime was donated by the six radio stations: WCFL, WENR, WGN, WIND, WJJD, and WLS. Fallon selected the personnel for the broadcasts. The lessons were written by teachers and principals. Lillian M. Tobin, Fallon's assistant who was generally in charge of elementary school curriculum for the district, was put in charge of the curriculum of the lessons broadcast. Oversight was provided by "subject area committees" that were tasked with ensuring quality and continuity in the lessons. Efforts were taken to make the broadcasts entertaining to students, in order to better engage them. For instance, explorer Carveth Wells was booked to speak during some of the broadcasts. Each day's instruction began at 7:15 am with the program for the day being read by Pritzlaff.

Lessons were scheduled in such a manner that different days of the week were dedicated to different subjects. Mondays, Wednesdays, and Fridays were dedicated to science and social studies, while Tuesdays, Thursdays, and Saturdays were dedicated to English studies and mathematics. Broadcast schedules, as well as directions, questions, and assignments were published in the city's newspapers, with all six of the city's daily newspapers cooperating.

A helpline was established in order to allow parents to provide comment, as well as to help answer questions parents would have about the radio programs and the epidemic, with educational personnel manning the hotline. The helpline was staffed by as many as sixteen to twenty-five teachers.

Parents were encouraged to supplement the lessons by facilitating daily study periods with their children following the broadcasts. In order to educate students who missed broadcasts, such as those who did not have access to a radio or those who encountered poor reception, make-up work was created.

Once students returned to in-person learning, they were tested on the material that had been covered by the radio broadcasts and newspaper publications. The purpose of these tests was both to assess the effectiveness of the instruction and to decide what grade credit each student would receive for their work on the radio lessons.

== Analysis ==
Superintendent Johnson gave the estimate that 315,000 students listened to the radio lessons, but also stated that it was "impossible to give an accurate check". Johnson received praise from university professors and other educators for his efforts related to remote instruction.

Criticisms faulted the radio format as being inadequate at providing instruction to students who required greater attention or remediation. Some educators and analysts posited the possibility that "the pupils who benefit by the radio lessons [were likely] those who need them least [and] who would suffer least by curtailment of their classroom instruction". One shortcoming identified in the format utilized was that some students found that the broadcasts, with their condensed time slots, moved at too fast a pace. This resulted in such students missing crucial pieces of information. Another identified shortcoming was that there was not universal access to radios, which we caused some students to be unable to listen to the broadcasts. Additionally, in houses that had multiple children of different grades but only one radio, conflicts had arisen when children had lessons that were aired in the same timeslot on different stations.

== Impact ==
Promptly following Chicago's lead, a number of other American communities that experienced polio outbreaks of their own, such as Rochester, New York and Cleveland, were quick to launch radio distance education programs.

Seeing potential in the medium of radio to provide educational lessons, the Chicago Board of Education continued producing educational programming. They formed the Chicago Radio Council and went on to launch their own radio station, WBEZ, in 1943.

== Renewed attention during the COVID-19 pandemic ==
Chicago's 1937 distance education program received renewed attention and analysis during the COVID-19 pandemic, during parts of which technology-enabled remote learning broadly supplanted in-person instruction. A number of sources mentioned Chicago's 1937 venture with distance education during a polio outbreak as a precursor of sorts to the distance education that took place during the COVID-19 pandemic.
