= Chicago Public Schools boycott =

1963 anti-segregation protest in Chicago, Illinois, US

The Chicago Public Schools boycott, also known as Freedom Day, was a mass boycott and demonstration against the segregationist policies of the Chicago Public Schools (CPS) on October 22, 1963. More than 200,000 students stayed out of school, and tens of thousands of Chicagoans joined in a protest that culminated in a march to the office of the Chicago Board of Education. The protest preceded the larger New York City public school boycott, also known as Freedom Day.

== History ==
Although Brown v. Board of Education prohibited racial segregation in schools, in 1963, Chicago's public schools continued to be segregated as a result of residential segregation. This was exacerbated by the migration of more black Americans from the Southern United States to Chicago during the Jim Crow era. School boundary lines were drawn specifically to preserve racial segregation, even as predominantly black schools grew overcrowded. Classes were held in hallways, and there were not enough books for all of the students. Some schools held double shifts, meaning students attended less than a full day of class. Rather than send black students to underpopulated white schools, Superintendent of Chicago Public Schools Benjamin Willis instituted the use of mobile classrooms; 625 aluminium trailers parked in the parking lots and playgrounds of overcrowded schools. Rosie Simpson of Englewood, Chicago, coined the term "Willis Wagons" to describe the mobile classrooms. At one high school, these trailers were used to maintain segregation within the school; black students' classes were held in Willis Wagons, while only white students went to class in the school.

== Freedom Day ==
In response to the school segregation enacted by Willis, community members began organizing resistance. Organizers included Chicago activist Albert Raby. The Coordinating Council of Community Organizations (CCCO) took the lead, organizing "Freedom Day," the mass boycott and protest. According to the chairman of the CCCO, Lawrence Landry, "The boycott is an effort to communicate dissatisfaction on how schools are being run." The Chicago Defender estimated that forty percent of CPS students would participate in the boycott. On October 22, 1963, nearly half of all CPS students skipped school, leaving schools on Chicago's South Side and West Side mostly empty. The Chicago Tribune reported that 224,770 students were absent from CPS, amounting to 47 percent of the student population. Some students opted to attend makeshift Freedom Schools instead. In addition to the boycott, nearly 10,000 protesters marched in Chicago's downtown, stopping outside the Chicago Board of Education offices. Chicago police kept protesters from entering the building.

While Freedom Day was popular and widely covered, it did not have significant impact in changing the policies of Superintendent Willis. Ultimately, CPS was not moved to integrate after Freedom Day, despite the best efforts of Black activists and the CCCO. Use of Willis Wagons prevailed, and Willis himself did not retire until 1966 (albeit four months before the end of his term). However, the size of the first Freedom Day protest inspired subsequent boycotts in Chicago and the United States.

The Freedom Day protest inspired Reverend Martin Luther King Jr.'s move to Chicago in 1966. Before Freedom Day, in August, 1963, then-college student Bernie Sanders was arrested while protesting the policies of Superintendent Willis.
