= William Johnson (educator) =

American educator (1895–1981)

15th Superintendent of Chicago Public Schools
- In office April 1936 – June 1946
- Preceded by: William J. Bogan
- Succeeded by: George F. Cassell (acting); Herold C. Hunt

Personal details
- Born: September 20, 1895 Chicago, Illinois
- Died: May 1, 1981 (aged 85) Fort Lauderdale, Florida
- Resting place: Graceland Cemetery, Chicago
- Spouse(s): Lillian Mattocks (m. 1919; died 1937) Helen Ronan (m. 1938)
- Children: 1
- Education: Northwestern University (B.S. & M.A.); University of Chicago (Ph.D)
- Profession: Educator

Military service
- Branch/service: Chemical Warfare Service (United States Army)
- Years of service: 1918
- Battles/wars: World War I

William Harding Johnson (September 20, 1895 – May 1, 1981) was an American educator who served as superintendent of Chicago Public Schools. His decade-long tenure as superintendent was controversial, and ended with him being pressured to resign after the National Education Association released a report which detailed corrupt and unethical actions by Johnson and the Chicago Board of Education, which resulted in the North Central Association of Colleges and Secondary Schools threatening to revoke its accreditation of Chicago Public Schools' high schools. Despite his controversy, he had a number of successes, such as being credited with decreased school truancy. He also introduced innovations to the school system, such as introducing an innovative remote education approach that utilized radio broadcasts amid school closures during a 1937 polio outbreak.

== Early life, education, and early career ==
Johnson was born September 20, 1895, in Chicago, Illinois. Johnson was born on September 20 Johnson was the son of Danish immigrants to the United States. Both of his parents originally hailed from Schleswig-Holstein. His father became a naturalized citizen, while his mother did not. Johnson was the youngest of his parents' children. He had an older sister named Cecilia (who was born in 1884), and two other siblings who died in early childhood. His family was protestant. Johnson's father worked several jobs during his time living in Chicago, including cab driver and grocer.

In 1901, at the age of six, Johnson began attending Langland Elementary School, where he would receive his entire elementary school education. Having graduated elementary school in June 1909, Johnson began attending high school at Tuley High School that September. In June 1913, Johnson graduated from Tuley High School.

Before starting college, Johnson had worked odd jobs, including working a janitor at a high school, in order to collect enough money to pay his tuition. Johnson attended Beloit College from 1913 through 1915, during which time he also worked as a chemistry laboratory assistant at the college. He was studying to be a chemistry and mathematics major, and focused heavily on his academics, having very little social involvement. He then transferred to Northwestern University. Similarly to his time at Beloit, Johnson focused heavily on his academics at Northwestern, and had very little social involvement. He graduated in June 1917 with a Bachelor of Science degree. In February 1917, he was admitted to Northwestern's graduate school, and he graduated with a Master of Arts degree in education on June 12, 1918. His master's thesis was titled Report of the Physical Condition of the Schools in Evanston, District 75 of the City of Evanston. While working to obtain his master's degree. For his first year of graduate school, Johnson worked as a teacher at Palatine High School as a chemistry and physics teacher, as well as the coach of the girls baseball and basketball teams. During his final months of grad school, he worked at Kankakee High School as a chemistry teacher. He would later go back to school and receive his Ph.D from the University of Chicago in 1921.

After graduating from graduate school, Johnson was eligible to be drafted into either the United States Army or United States Navy. He enlisted right after his graduation, and served as a research chemist in the Chemical Warfare Service's American University Research Division in Washington, D.C. and with the Army Board of Psychology (where he helped to determine the mental status of men). He also did some work with intelligence testing. He served in these roles from June 1918 through December 1918. He was discharged from service on December 10, 1918, after the end of World War I.

Johnson held a job as a chemistry instructor at Rockford College during the 1918–1919 school year.

In 1919, Johnson married Lillian Mattocks, who he had met when they both attended Tuley High School. She took his surname, becoming Lillian Mattocks Johnson.

Soon after departing his job at Rockford College, Johnson began working at Fort Scott Community College in Fort Scott, Kansas, which he held for two school years (from 1919 through 1921).

== Chicago Public Schools career ==
=== Early employment ===
In 1921, Johnson was hired by Chicago Public Schools as a math teacher at Lane Technical High School. He would go onto work as Lane Tech's director of vocational guidance, holding this position until 1924. In this job, he worked with William J. Bogan, who was serving as the school's principal. Their relationship was rather unfriendly, with Bogan seeing Johnson as an opportunist.

In 1922, his wife Lillian also became a teacher in the Chicago Public Schools system.

Johnson received his Ph.D. from the University of Chicago while working at Lane Technical High School. In 1921, Johnson enrolled at the University of Chicago as a doctoral student, and received his Ph.D. in educational administration two years later. His dissertation was titled Mental Growth Curve of Secondary School Students.

In 1923, Johnson submitted an application to Chicago Normal College for a job teaching courses on education. He was hired in 1924, and resigned his position at Lane Technical High School. From November 1924 through February 1924, he served as the editor of the Chicago Schools Journal. He would continue submitting articles to this journal until retiring as an educator in 1953. In 1924, he also began teaching educational administration courses at Loyola University Chicago on a part-time basis. In March 1925, after passing the principal's examination, Johnson left his position at Chicago Normal College.

In 1925, Johnson received a position as the principal of Daniel Webster Grammar School. In January 1928, Johnson left this position after accepting the position of principal at the still-under-construction Alessandro Volta Grammar School. From January 1928 through January 1931, the school operated in temporary wooden structures. The school moved into its permanent building on January 8, 1931. While Johnson was well-liked by most parents of students, he was not without criticism. In 1931, a research assistant sent by now-Superintendent William J. Bogan's Advisory Council Subcommittee on Education visited the school, and strongly criticized Johnson for practices he had implemented in the school that Johnson had written an article about that was published in an educational journal. During his time as principal, Johnson also continued to teach educational administration classes part-time at Loyola University. From October 1929 through May 1935, Johnson also worked as the Saturday morning lecturer at the Chicago Historical Society. He also taught educational administration classes for Catholic nuns at Saint Xavier College. In 1927, he authored a book on visual education.

In October 1927, Johnson's wife Lillian became the assistant principal of the system's Gale School, a job she held until taking a leave of absence due to illness in February 1936.

During the Great Depression, Johnson was relatively unscathed, since he had not invested significantly in the stock market.

Johnson, in his time as a principal, had cultivated a public perception of himself as being an effective administrator, having been generally liked by parents and respected by teachers. In 1935, Johnson requested to be made a high school principal, but was instead promoted by the Chicago Board of Education to assistant superintendent. This made him the assistant to superintendent of Chicago Public Schools William Bogan. He had been appointed by the Chicago Board of Education in July 1935, over Bogan's wishes. He had been selected both for his educational credentials, and due the fact that he had never spoken out against the board. Upon his departure from his principal position, he was presented with a lifetime membership in the National Educational Association.

Due to Bogan being ill, Johnson took over much of the superintendent's workload. Johnson also worked to cultivate his popularity with teachers by personally visiting any of the city's high schools.

Johnson floated an idea by teachers during one of his school visits that would see Chicago Public Schools implement a program review where a duo of district superintendents would go to each school and conduct inspections at the schools to see whether standards would be met. Under his proposed plan, the superintendents would not deal with teachers, but would instead only engage with principals. However, this created an uproar among some teachers at the meeting who did not want to have the Chicago Public Schools central office sticking their nose in their business.

=== Superintendency ===
After the March 1936 death in office of Superintendent Joseph Bogan, Johnson was elected by a vote of the Chicago Board of Education on April 22, 1936, to be Chicago Public Schools' new superintendent. He had been selected despite opposition from numerous citizen groups. Johnson was the first native Chicagoan to serve as superintendent of Chicago Public Schools. He took office in late April 1936. At the age of forty, he was the youngest person to ever hold the position. His tenure would ultimately extend ten years, which was longer than the tenures any previous superintendent of Chicago Public Schools.

Johnson proved to be a controversial figure From the early days of his superintendency, Johnson became a target for the Chicago Daily News. Johnson was regarded as being under the influences of Mayor of Chicago Edward Joseph Kelly and president of the Chicago Board of Education James B. McCahey. McCahey himself was controversial. Throughout his superintendency, Johnson was seen as hostile towards teachers and faced heavy criticism from teachers, parents, church groups, and civic groups.

Early into his superintendency, Johnson was criticized, particularly by the Chicago Daily News, for budget expenditures.

Early on, Johnson was faced with an ultimatum from the North Central Association of Colleges and Secondary Schools to increase the size of high school teaching staff, or to face losing the association's accreditation, which would have the consequence of making it so that high school graduates from Chicago Public Schools high schools would be required to take examinations before being admitted to the association's member colleges.

During his superintendency, Johnson would introduce successful new record systems, remedial reading programs, among a few other innovations.

He attracted major controversy for his administration of the 1936–37 Chicago Public Schools' principal's examination. First, he continued to teach classes at Loyola University that prepare people for the Chicago Public Schools' principal's examination, despite being the one in charge of overseeing that examination. Secondly, he altered the grading system for oral component of the examination without having been given any legal authority to do so by the Board of Examiners. On March 14, 1938, J.J. Zmrhal, a district superintendent of Chicago Public Schools, released a sworn affidavit accusing Johnson of corrupt practices related to the exam. Soon after, upon retiring from the examining committee, Daniel J. Beeby publicly declared, "J.J. Zmrhal's affidavit is a true and accurate statements to the conduct of the principals' oral examination." Numerous court cases would ensue against the Board of Education pertaining to the exam.

In 1937, the city was hit by a polio outbreak which resulted in the Chicago Board of Health ordering schools to be closed during what was supposed to be the start of the school year. The school closure wound up lasting three weeks. However, Johnson and assistant superintendent Minnie Fallon managed to provide the instruction to the city's elementary school students by providing at-home distance education through radio broadcasts. This was the first large-scale implementation of radio broadcasting for distance education.

In November 1937, Johnson's wife, Lillian, died after a long illness. He was remarried five months later, in April 1938, to Helen Ronan, who had been Lillian's nurse.

The Chicago Tribune credited Johnson with playing a role the city's decrease of the schools' truancy rate over his first years as superintendent and his preceding year as assistant superintendent.

In 1938 and 1939, Johnson wrote a weekly column in the Chicago Evening American.

Partnering with the Works Progress Administration, Johnson created a work placement counseling service available to both high school students and dropouts.

Johnson expanded the city's vocational training, and constructed the Chicago Vocational High School.

During his tenure as superintendent he served in the leadership of a number of organizations. From 1939 through 1942, he was president of the Illinois Industrial Education Association, and in 1941 and 1942 he was president of the Illinois Vocational Education Association.

Johnson was accused of approving temporary certificates for teachers without valid certificates, despite the fact that thousands of teachers with valid certificates were on wait lists for jobs, and faced a barrage of criticism for this in 1938 and 1939.

From the United States' entry into World War II, until the end of the war, many of the city's school buildings were handed over to the federal government for use related to the war effort as training centers. This caused overcrowding in the remaining city schools, for which parents blamed Johnson.

In September 1944, Johnson implemented the non-transfer plan, a new policy passed by the Chicago Board of Education which cancelled all school permits which allowed students to transfer to schools located outside of their district. This meant students that had been attending schools outside of their districts on such permits now had to leave those schools and move to a school within their own district. The implementation of this policy also coincided with a change in the boundaries of the school districts in the system. In protest of the impact of both of these factors, hundreds of parents kept their children at home in protest, while hundreds more began enrolling their children in private schools. Hundreds of parents protest outside of Johnson's office on September 8, 1944. When Johnson spoke with the protesters, he pledged to study the problem.

On the night of September 22, 1944, a his apartment was attacked with a bomb. Nobody was hurt. His daughter, who was home at the time, managed to escape uninjured. Police never managed to solve who had committed the attack.

In February 1942, Johnson received broad criticism for what was seen as the unjust transfer of a school principal. At the demand of McCahey, Johnson ordered Olive Brunner, the principal of the Spaulding School for Crippled Children removed from that position and replaced with Celestine Igoe, the sister of former Democratic Party leader and incumbent federal judge Michael L. Igoe. This, and other similarly political personnel moves, saw Edward E. Keener, the president of the Chicago division of the Illinois State Teachers Association, lead an effort to convince the National Education Association (NEA) to launch an investigation into personnel practices undertaken by Johnson and the Chicago Board of Education. A thorough inquiry was launched by the NEA in November 1944. It was released in 1945, and outlined many examples of actions throughout Johnson's tenure that it characterized as improper. This included the conduct of the 1936–37 principal's examination, many personnel-related actions. The report also found that textbooks which Johnson purported to have written were actually ghost written by teachers and other school employees, work that they usually conducted during school hours. The report also opined that Johnson had violated NEA's "code of Ethics of the Teaching Profession" by recommending that Chicago schools utilize his own textbooks, from which he would profit. While the entire Chicago Public Schools administration was lambasted in the report, Johnson took the bulk of the heat from the public after the report's release.

After much public pressure, the Chicago City Council created a committee to hold hearings the charges that had been by the report. However, the committee consisted of five aldermen loyal to Mayor Kelly. Hearings were held on March 18 and 19 of 1946. Two days after the hearings, the committee issued a report that absolved Johnson and the Chicago Board of Education of wrongdoing, finding, "that the charges made against the Board of Education of the City of Chicago and its officials have not been sustained." Two days after this report was released, an ultimatum was made by the North Central Association of Colleges and Secondary Schools, threatening to revoke accreditation of the city's high schools if the controversies were not addressed.

On April 1, 1946, Mayor Kelly created an advisory committee to address the problems with Chicago Public Schools. The committee was led by Henry Townley Heald. Kelly promised to follow the recommendations that the committee would issue. The committee approved a majority decision on June 18, 1946, which, among other things, recommended that Johnson resign. Under pressure from Kelly and McCahey, Johnson resigned in June.

=== Subsequent work ===
Johnson was still well-liked by the Chicago Board of Education members, and thus, immediately after resigning as superintendent, was made vice president of the Chicago City Junior College. However, with the North Central Association of Colleges and Secondary Schools expressed great disapproval of this, demanding Johnson be dismissed from this position. After Herold C. Hunt took office as superintendent in June 1947, he demoted Johnson to principal of McPherson Elementary School. Despite parents at the school going to Hunt and demanding Johnson not be assigned to their school, the Chicago Board of Education still formally appointed Johnson as the schools principal in the fall of 1947. Johnson took office as principal on February 2, 1948, and remained in that job until retiring in June 1953.

== Retirement ==
When Johnson retired in 1953, he was only 57 years old. He had saved and invested his money well. He spent his first year of retirement by traveling around the globe. After this he spent his summers on his farm in Minnesota and his winters in Florida.

== Personal life ==
In 1919, Johnson married Lillian Mattocks, who he had met when they both attended Tuley High School. She took his surname, becoming Lilliam Mattocks Johnson. Lillian would attend Northern Illinois Normal College and, in 1922, became a teacher in the Chicago Public School system. She later served as an assistant principal. In 1936, the Johnsons adopted a daughter, Patricia Joyce. Nineteen months after adopting her daughter, Lillian died in November 1937. in April 1938, five months after Lillian's death, he married Helen Ronan, who had been Lillian's nurse. Helen would not work during their marriage, staying home to care for Patricia Joyce. The forty-two year long marriage of William and Helen Johnson was said to have developed into a very devoted relationship.

From 1930 through 1947, Johnson's family were members of the Buena Park Memorial Presbyterian Church in Chicago.

=== Death ===
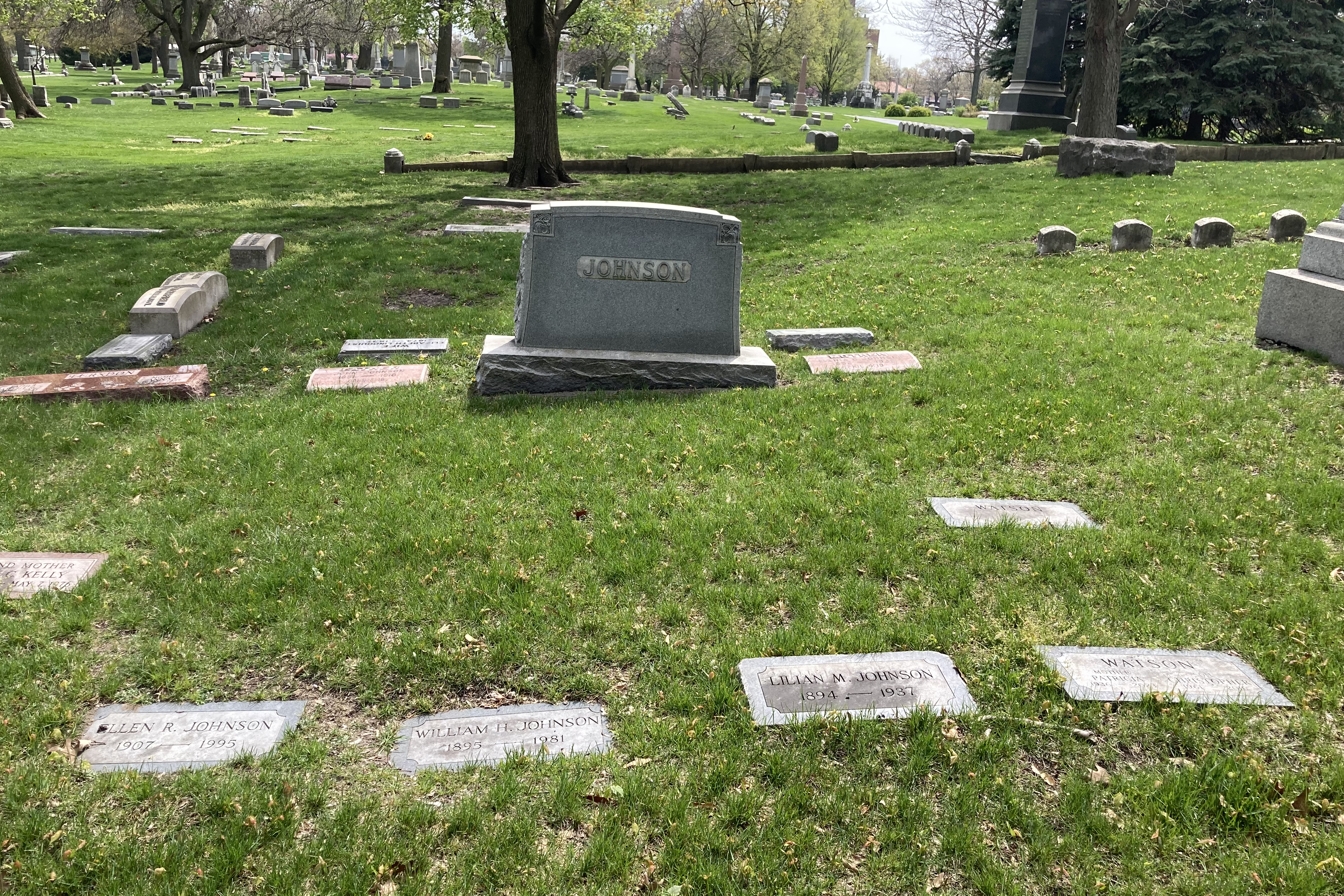
Johnson's grave at Graceland Cemetery

Johnson died on May 1, 1981, in Fort Lauderdale, Florida at the age of 85. Per his wishes, he was cremated, and his ashes were buried next to his parents and his first wife, Lillian Mattocks Johnson, in Chicago's Graceland Cemetery.

== Honors ==
In 1938, Johnson received an honorary doctorates from John Brown University in recognition of his leadership in vocational education. In 1939, the Chicago Teachers College (what was formerly known as the "Chicago Normal College") gave him an honorary Doctor of Law degree. The government of Greece also gave him awards, including awarding him "Commander Order of the Phoenix" in 1939.
