= Albert Raby =

American activist (1933 - 1988)

Albert Anderson Raby (1933 – November 23, 1988) was a teacher at Chicago's Hess Upper Grade Center who secured the support of Martin Luther King Jr. to desegregate schools and housing in Chicago between 1965 and 1967. Raby was a part of the civil rights movement and helped create the Coordinating Council of Community Organizations (CCCO), the mission of the CCCO was to end segregation in Chicago schools. Raby tried to stay out of the media and public eye, which limited information known about him.

== Early life ==
Raby was born in Chicago, Illinois in 1933, dropping out of school in the eighth grade. He became involved in a union, and, after a stint in the army, earned his grammar school diploma at age 24. He went on to earn his high school diploma immediately after that. He attended day and evening school to earn his high school diploma. In 1960, he earned a teaching degree from Chicago Teachers College and entered the profession.

== CCCO formation ==
Raby was a member of the Teachers for Integrated Schools and helped form the Coordinating Council of Community Organizations (CCCO) in 1962. In 1963, Raby assisted in organizing the Chicago Public School Boycott. TFIS selected him to be their delegate to the CCCO. On January 11, 1964, he was appointed the organization's convener (Anderson and Pickering 129).

When the CCCO movement was officially launched, Raby became its co-chairman.

As a member of the Agenda Committee, Raby assisted in choosing open housing as the initial campaign for the movement. Along with King in July 1966, he attended the initial meeting with Mayor Richard J. Daley where the demands of the movement were presented. Raby served as a leader of open housing marches, using his position as a local leader to draw upon those in Chicago communities affected by housing segregation.

== Later career ==
In 1969, Raby was elected as one of two delegates to the Illinois Constitutional Convention from the 24th legislative district in Chicago. He was endorsed in the election by the Independent Voters of Illinois, and was not backed by the Cook County Democratic Party.

Raby was the Director of the Peace Corps in Ghana from 1979 to 1982. Afterwards, he returned to Chicago and was the campaign manager for Harold Washington's successful mayoral campaign in 1983. Washington appointed him to head the City of Chicago's Commission on Human Relations in May 1983.

== Death and recognition ==
Raby collapsed and died from a heart attack on November 23, 1988.

In 2004 a Chicago Public High School named after Al Raby was opened. Located in the Garfield Park neighborhood, Al Raby High School for Community and Environment focuses on social justice issues as well as geographical information systems.

In October of 2026, an honorary street dedication in Chicago renamed Cottage Grove Ave. between 63rd and 64th streets as Al Raby Lane. At the dedication ceremony, Chicago's mayor also proclaimed that February 19, 2027 would be Al Raby Day. The Al Raby Foundation, whose CEO and co-founder is his granddaughter Katanya Raby, continues his work.
