= Compton Unified School District =

School district in California, United States

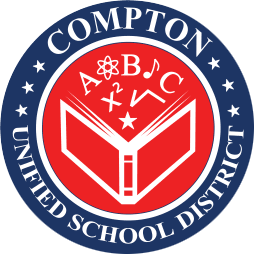

Address
- 501 S. Santa Fe Avenue Compton, California, 90221; United States
- Coordinates: 33°53′29″N 118°13′00″W

District information
- Grades: Pre-kindergarten – 12
- Superintendent: Darin Brawley
- Budget: 455.705 Million
- NCES District ID: 0609620

Students and staff
- Enrollment: 16,738 (2023–24)
- Faculty: 696.86 (FTE)
- Staff: 1,062.02 (FTE)
- Student–teacher ratio: 24.02

Other information
- Website: compton.k12.ca.us

Compton Unified School District is a school district headquartered in Compton, California, United States.

The district serves almost all of Compton, all of East Rancho Dominguez, most of Willowbrook CDP, portions of Carson, Lynwood, West Rancho Dominguez CDP, and a small sliver of Paramount.

== History ==
=== State takeover (1993–2003) ===
By the early 1990s, the district was deep in debt and its students had some of the lowest test scores in California. In 1993 the California State Legislature passed Assembly Bill 657, written by Assemblyman Willard Murray. The law told the State Superintendent of Public Instruction to appoint an administrator who would take over the powers of the school board. It also gave the district an emergency loan of $10.5 million, which lawmakers later raised to $20 million. The state took control of the district in July 1993. Compton was the first school district in California to be taken over by the state for both financial and academic problems. The elected school board stayed in place, but it only had advisory powers.

Progress was slow in the first few years. Five state-appointed administrators ran the district between 1993 and 1997, and four of them served within a single year. In 1997 Jeff Leeds of the Los Angeles Times wrote that the physical conditions of the campuses had become worse since the takeover. Delaine Eastin, the State Superintendent of Public Instruction, decided not to close the school district even though she received requests to do so. That same year the local board lost a court case in which it tried to win back control, and the California State Assembly voted 73–3 for a bill by Assemblyman Carl Washington that set out a process for returning the district to local control.

In 1997 the American Civil Liberties Union of Southern California also sued the state, saying that Compton students were not getting an adequate education. The case was settled in March 2000. Under the settlement, the district and the state had to provide basic needs such as working toilets, enough textbooks and a certified teacher in every classroom. Around the same time, the state approved more than $100 million for school building projects, after local voters had turned down a school construction bond three times.

Randolph E. Ward, a former superintendent from the Long Beach area, became the fifth state administrator in 1996. Under Ward, more than 200 school buildings got new roofs and about 150 were condemned. The district bought about $500,000 worth of textbooks and began using bar codes to keep track of them. By early 2001, at least half of the district's staff of about 1,500 were new. Test scores went up, but they were still well below those of most California schools, and about 55 percent of the district's teachers had emergency credentials, compared with 13 percent statewide.

Compton began paying back the state loan in 1997, and it made its last payment on the $19.6 million it owed in the summer of 2001. In September 2001 a state review found that the district had met its goals in five areas: community relations, personnel, facilities, finance and student achievement. The state returned control of the schools to the elected board in December 2001, and a new superintendent was hired. Ward stayed on as a state trustee to keep watch over the district. In June 2003 State Superintendent Jack O'Connell announced that Compton would return to full local control because its test scores and finances had improved a great deal. Ward was then appointed to oversee the Oakland Unified School District.

=== Since 2012 ===
Darin Brawley became superintendent in 2012. Before coming to Compton, he had led school turnaround work as a deputy superintendent in Adelanto. Test scores in the district were rising before the COVID-19 pandemic and kept rising after it. Between about 2022 and 2024 the district set up a tutoring program, and its math and reading scores improved after the pandemic. By 2025 more than 250 tutors were working in the district's classrooms every day. Students also took frequent diagnostic tests, and those who needed extra help could get it during school, after school or on Saturdays.

Researchers with the Education Recovery Scorecard found that Compton was one of several districts with similar demographics whose scores had risen above their 2019 levels. In the spring 2024 state tests, 41.9 percent of Compton students in grades 3 to 8 met the standard in reading, compared with 44.8 percent statewide. In math, the figures were 36.7 percent for Compton and 36.9 percent for the state. In 2026 a study by researchers at Harvard, Stanford and Dartmouth named Compton as one of 108 districts where both reading and math scores were improving faster than in districts with similar students. Some teachers in the district have said that it puts too much focus on test preparation.

== Schools ==
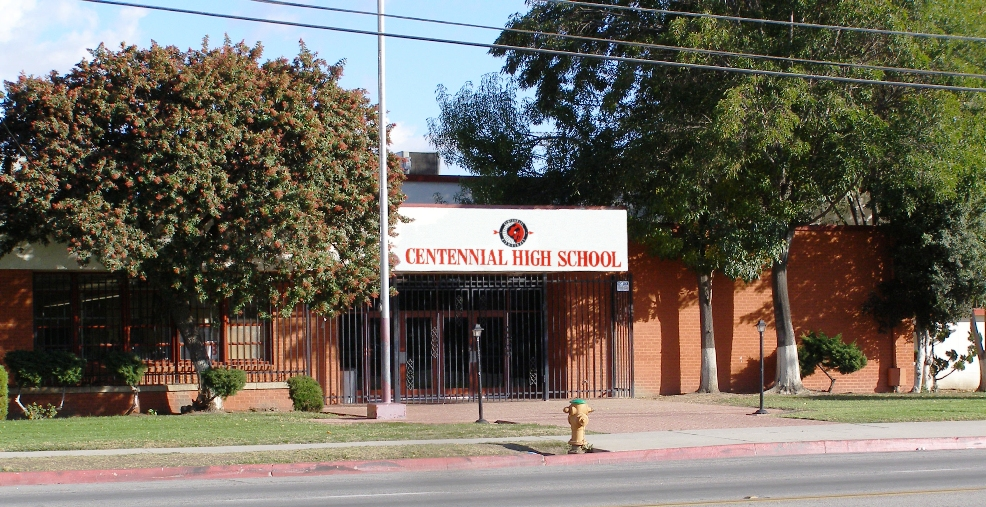
Centennial High School

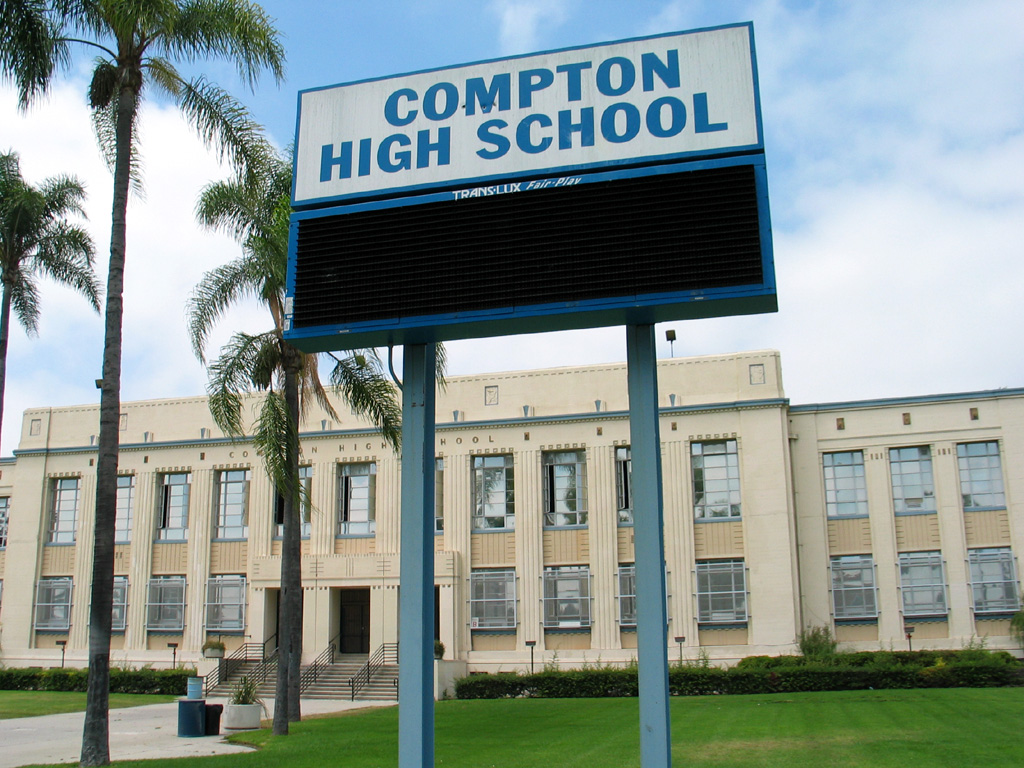
Compton High School

=== Continuation schools ===
- Cesar Chavez Continuation High School (Unincorporated area)

=== Secondary schools ===
==== High schools ====
Zoned

- Centennial High School (Compton)
- Compton High School (Compton)
- Manuel Dominguez High School (Compton)
- Compton Early College High School (Compton)

Alternative

- Compton Community Day High School (Unincorporated area)

==== Middle schools ====
Zoned

- Ralph J. Bunche Middle School (Unincorporated area)
- Benjamin O. Davis, Jr. Middle School (Compton)
- Enterprise Middle School (Compton)
- Franklin D. Roosevelt Middle School (Compton)
- Frank L. Walton Middle School (Compton)
- Franklin S. Whaley Middle School (Unincorporated area)
- Willowbrook Middle School (Compton)

Alternative

- Compton Community Day Middle School (Unincorporated area)

=== Primary schools ===
Zoned, K-5

- Anderson Elementary School (Compton)
- Ralph Bunche Elementary School (Carson)
- Charles W. Bursch Elementary School (Compton)
- George Washington Carver Elementary School (Unincorporated area)
- William Jefferson Clinton Elementary School (Paramount)
- Clarence A. Dickison Elementary School (Compton)
- Ralph Waldo Emerson Elementary School (Compton)
- Stephen C. Foster Elementary School (Compton)
- Thomas Jefferson Elementary School (Unincorporated area)
- Colin P. Kelly Elementary School (Compton)
- Robert F. Kennedy Elementary School (Compton)
- Martin Luther King Jr. Elementary School (Unincorporated area)
- Laurel Street Elementary School (Compton)
- Henry Longfellow Elementary School (Compton)
- Augusta A. Mayo Elementary School (Compton)
- McKinley Elementary School (Unincorporated area)
- Ronald E. McNair Elementary School (Compton)
- Theodore Roosevelt Elementary School (Compton)
- General Rosecrans Elementary School (Compton)
- Ardella B. Tibby Elementary School (Compton)
- George Washington Elementary School (Unincorporated area)

Zoned, 3-5

- Augusta A. Mayo Elementary School (Compton)

== See also ==
- List of school districts in Los Angeles County, California
- Ted Kimbrough, former superintendent
