= Ted Kimbrough =

American educator and education administrator (1935–2018)

- Kimbrough, 1990.

18th Superintendent of Sacramento City Unified School District
- In office February 6, 1996 – February 20, 1997 (interim until May 6, 1996)
- Preceded by: Jim Sweeney (interim)
- Succeeded by: Jim Sweeney

22nd Superintendent of Chicago Public Schools
- In office January 1, 1990 – February 1, 1993
- Preceded by: Manford Byrd Jr. Charles D. Almo (interim)
- Succeeded by: Argie Johnson; Richard E. Stephenson Jr. (interim)

Superintendent of Compton Unified School District
- In office October 1982 – January 1990

Personal details
- Born: January 8, 1935 Chicago, Illinois
- Died: April 16, 2018 (aged 83) Los Angeles, California
- Children: 9
- Education: Northern Illinois University; California State University, Los Angeles

Ted D. Kimbrough (January 8, 1935 – April 16, 2018) was an American educator who served as superintendent of Chicago Public Schools, Sacramento Unified School District, and Compton Unified School District. Kimbrough is recognized as the third African American and the second African American man to lead the Chicago Public Schools, following Manford Byrd Jr., who was the first African American man to hold the position.

== Early life and education ==
Kimbrough was born in Chicago, Illinois, and raised in nearby Evanston, Illinois. Kimbrough was black. Kimbrough received his undergraduate degree from Northern Illinois University, and his master's degree from California State University, Los Angeles.

== Career ==
=== Los Angeles Unified School District ===
Kimbrough started his career in education working as an industrial arts teacher in the Los Angeles Unified School District. He would work in the district for 26 years. After being a teacher, he became a principal. He eventually came to hold administrative roles in the district, serving as the school system's legislative lobbyist, director of revenue, and assistant superintendent.

=== Superintendent of Compton Unified School District ===
In September 1982, Kimbrough was appointed to be superintendent of the Compton Unified School District. He took office the following month. Kimbrough inherited a troubled school system. The system had had instability in leadership, going through eleven separate superintendents in the previous fifteen years. The system was struggling with gang-related activity. When Kimbrough took office, the system was in the midst of a scandal related to altered student test scores, as Kimbrough held an investigation into the test scores matter and other allegations, and, in well as allegations of nepotism, employees with false credentials, and illegal maintenance contracts. In his first two years, removed at least forty high-ranking administrators.

Kimbrough was controversial since the early days of his tenure. During his tenure, Kimbrough faced numerous unsuccessful campaigns demanding his removal from office. At one point, he himself threatened his resignation. The school board was sharply divided during his time as superintendent, with numerous trustees being in opposition to Kimbrough. There was a teachers' strike during his tenure. Additionally, in 1989, the district lost 158 teachers who departed the school district in order to take higher paying jobs with the Los Angeles Unified School District. Kimbrough worked to establish a number of programs to connect California's system of state universities with the Public schools.

In 1989, a principal in the district alleged that Kimbrough had sexually harassed her and denied her a promotion after she refused to partake in a sex game in which administrators took turns hiding $20 bills on their bodies. The school board trustees backed Kimbrough, declaring the charges groundless. Kimbrough admitted to having participated in some sort of game, but outright denied the game being of a sexual nature. Kimbrough was credited with having installed greater order and professionalism in the school district. Kimbrough was credited with decreasing gang violence in the school district. Some educators praised progress made under Kimbrough's superintendency. In 1987, the Association of California School Administrators named him "superintendent of the year". In 1988, he was named "superintendent of the year" by the American Association of School Administrators, who cited both his institution of programs to enhance communications between the school district and its employees, as well as his work on aiding "problem students" to return to mainstream classes. Ahead of his departure, the Associated Press wrote that he had, "demonstrated his resilience" as superintendent in Compton. Kimbrough left office in 1990, taking office in Chicago. Despite the progress Kimbrough had been credited with making for the district, in 1993 (three years after he left office), the state of California took control of the school district due to its chronically poor educational performance.

=== Superintendent of Chicago Public Schools ===
Concluding a roughly year-long search for a new superintendent of Chicago Public Schools, in October 1989, the Chicago Board of Education announced that, effective January 1990, Kimbrough would take the helm of Chicago Public Schools, the third-largest school system in the United States. During their nationwide search for a new superintendent, school officials had expressed interest in choosing a Black superintendent, since over sixty percent of enrolled students were Black at the time. Kimbrough was given a $175,000 salary for his four-year contract, which was $75,000 more than the previous permanent superintendent, Manford Byrd Jr., and made Kimbrough one of the highest-paid school superintendents in the United States.

Kimbrough inherited a troubled system, with a high dropout rate, gang problems, and poor academic scores. In 1987, then-United States secretary of education William Bennett had criticized the system as being the nation's worst. Many of the issues the district suffered paralleled the issues Compton's school district had been facing. When Kimbrough was appointed, Chicago Public Schools was undergoing a substantial restructuring targeted at providing parents with more control over local schools. These changes were mandated by the state's Chicago School Reform Act, and included the establishment of Local School Councils, and the decentralization of the Chicago Board of Education with the elimination of hundreds of administrative positions. At the time, The New York Times described it as, "what may be the most sweeping school decentralization plan ever attempted in the United States", and the Los Angeles Times described it outright as being, "the most radical decentralization program in the history of U.S. education. The New York Times also described the reformed role of superintendent under this plan as, "likely to be far different from any other in the country", as the central Chicago Board of Education relinquished most of its central budgetary and hiring authority, and was instead tasked with focusing on setting policy, and arranging centralized efforts (such as busing, testing, and providing oversight to the work of the Local School Councils). The overall role of the superintendent under this new scheme was not entirely defined at the time Kimbrough was appointed, but was overall tasked with putting in place policies for the central Chicago Board of Education. At the time of his appointment, Kimbrough called both his new position and the decentralization reforms of the school system a challenge, calling the decentralization reforms, "an experiment that is different from what has been tried in other places," and commenting, "I think this is an opportunity to show what can be done to bring about change in a large urban district."

In March 1990, Kimbrough fired Charles Almo, the district's personnel director. Almo had previously served as acting superintendent from August 1989 until Kimbrough took office in January 1990. Kimbrough stated that he had done this as part of an effort to hire his own team for senior school administration officials. The Chicago Sun-Times would later describe his tenure as "tumultuous". In 1993, Kimbrough was abruptly fired on January 27, 1993, by a vote of the Chicago Board of Education to discontinue his contract. The board stated their reason for this was that he had failed to adhere to their directives. Kimbrough's tenure ended February 1, 1993. Two years after Kimbrough left office, the Chicago school district shifted away from its decentralization scheme and into mayoral control, due to poor results.

== Superintendent of Sacramento City Unified School District ==
Beginning February 6, 1996, Kimbrough began serving as acting superintendent of the Sacramento City Unified School District. Effective on May 7, 1996, he became permanent superintendent. Kimbrough was bought out of his contract for $286,500 in February 1997. His tenure ended on February 20, 1997. Kimbrough retired as an educator thereafter, ending his 40-year career in education.

== Personal life and death ==
Kimbrough was married, and had nine children. Kimbrough died of complications from Alzheimer's disease at the age of 83 on April 16, 2018, in Los Angeles.
