= Benjamin Willis (educator) =

American educator and school administrator

Superintendent of Broward County Public Schools
- In office 1969–1972

Member of the President's Science Advisory Committee
- In office 1962–1966

17th Superintendent of Chicago Public Schools
- In office September 1, 1953 – August 31, 1966
- Preceded by: Herold C. Hunt
- Succeeded by: James F. Redmond; Thaddeus Lubera (interim)

Superintendent of Buffalo Public Schools
- In office September 1, 1950 – September 1, 1953

Superintendent of Yonkers Public Schools
- In office July 1, 1947 – September 1, 1950
- Preceded by: William R. Williams
- Succeeded by: Stanley S. Wynstra

Superintendent of Washington County Public Schools
- In office August 1, 1940 – July 1, 1947
- Preceded by: Byron J. Grimes
- Succeeded by: William M. Brish

Superintendent of Schools for Caroline County, Maryland
- In office 1934–1940
- Preceded by: Edward M. Noble

Personal details
- Born: December 23, 1901 Baltimore, Maryland
- Died: August 27, 1988 (age 86) Plantation, Florida
- Spouse: Rachel Davis Webster (m. 1925)
- Children: 1
- Education: George Washington University (BA); University of Maryland (MA); Columbia University (Ed.D.)

Benjamin Coppage Willis (December 23, 1901 – August 27, 1988) was an educator and school administrator who served as superintendent of various school districts, most notably as superintendent of Chicago Public Schools.

Willis had received praise during his superintendency in several school districts prior to arriving in Chicago. While the first eight years tenure in Chicago were widely praised, the latter five years faced massive controversy, with critics demanding his resignation and accusing him of perpetuating racial segregation in the city's schools.

== Early life and education ==
Willis was born December 23, 1901, on a farm in Baltimore, Maryland. His parents were Clarence Milton Coppage and Elizabeth Estelle Coppage (née Willis).

He studied at St John's College in Maryland. He received his Bachelor of Arts from George Washington University in 1922. He would later receive a Master of Arts degree from University of Maryland in 1926 Doctor of Education from Columbia University in 1950. Additionally, 1933, he attended Johns Hopkins University, taking additional coursework on school administration.

== Early career ==
Willis began his career as a teacher and principal of a four-room schoolhouse in Henderson, Maryland in 1922 and 1923. From 1923 through 1927, he served as a principal in Federalsburg, Maryland, working at both its elementary school and high school during this time. From 1927 through 1931, he served as principal of Caroline High School in Denton, Maryland. He served as principal of Sparrows Point High School. From 1932 through 1934, he served as a principal in Cantonsville High School.

== Superintendent of schools for Caroline County ==
From 1934 through 1940, he served as school superintendent for Caroline County, Maryland. He had been appointed in late May 1934.

== Superintendent of Washington County Public Schools ==
From 1940 through 1947, he served as school superintendent for Washington County Public Schools in Washington County, Maryland. The county's board of education formally appointed him on June 11, 1940, slating him to take office on August 1, 1940. He departed this position in July 1947 in order to become superintendent in Yonkers, New York.

His tenure here, together with his previous stint as superintendent in Caroline County, helped to earn him a reputation as a leader in the field of education.

While he departed with praise, expenditures he and the school board had made would be negatively scrutinized after his departure. They were accused of paying for projects without approval of the county commissioners.

== Superintendent of Yonkers Public Schools ==
On July 1, 1947, Willis became superintendent Yonkers Public Schools, a position he held until September 1, 1950. Upon his resignation, his tenure was lauded by the Yonkers Teachers Association.

== Superintendent of Buffalo Public Schools ==
On September 1, 1950, Willis left his position as superintendent of Yonkers Public Schools and assumed the position of superintendent of Buffalo Public Schools, a position he held until 1953. He had been formally hired on May 10, 1950.

In 1953, he gave his support to efforts by the Board of Regents of the New York State Education Department to create educational television channels. He gave his support amid these efforts having faced negative allegations that the channels would be used for propaganda, mind control, and would function as state media.

He took an unpopular position in reorganizing the city's schools by proposing the closure of two long-standing high schools, and the repurposing of their structures. Despite many residents' dislike of this proposal, the local Urban League supported it, and it was ultimately implemented.

Willis was given high regard during his stint in Buffalo, and his tenure was seen as successful.

== Superintendent of Chicago Public Schools ==
In 1953, he was appointed superintendent of Chicago Public Schools. He left Buffalo for his new job in Chicago, starting on September 1, 1953, and becoming the highest-paid educator in the United States at the time with an annual salary of $30,000. In 1957, when the board renewed Benjamin C. Willis' contract as superintendent, he was given a pay raise that increased his salary to $42,500, making him once again the highest-paid school superintendent in the nation. His salary was so high that, in 1963, the only public official in the United States with a higher salary was the president of the United States. Along with the pay raise, during his 1957 contract renewal he also received a promise from Board of Education President William B. Traynor that he would be given free rein in running the schools.

For his first eight years in the job, despite encountering some problems related to the growth of school system, Willis received strong public support. His actions drew praise. During the earlier part of his tenure, Willis was among the most celebrated school superintendents of the time, and was hailed in both local and national media for modeling efficiency and competence. This created a positive image for the school district.

During his first year, he negotiated a new salary schedule for teachers, which included raises and which put in place a six-hour day for all teachers.

Willis was hailed for his construction of new schools. In his tenure, he streamlined the construction of new school buildings and built over 100 new school buildings, which earned him the nickname "Big Ben the Builder". Several bond issues were approved by voters during his tenure for new school construction, and the money was carefully spent with strong planning, heavily overseen by Willis. By 1963, 40% of students attended school in new or modernized structures.

He also decreased class sizes, reintroduced summer school, and expanded the junior college system.

Willis acquired a reputation for asserting his authority. Willis opposed what he saw as efforts by the Chicago Board of Education to intrude on his authority. For instance, 1963, after the school board altered details of a student transfer plan, he resigned in protest. The board relented to his pressure, withdrawing their actions and rehiring three weeks later.

=== Racial matters and protests ===
Despite his praise in the first years of his tenure, Willis would, ultimately, become among the most controversial school officials in the United States. His final three to five years on the job were full of controversy, largely surrounding the issue of desegregation.

Willis considered schools to be a place for education, not social change. He believed that educators' responsibility was outside of the influence of politics. He viewed race as irrelevant to the role of educating. He believed that school policy needed to be "colorblind". and was against taking race as a consideration in educational policy. He also strongly believed that "neighborhood schools" were a positive.

As superintendent, Willis was accused of continuing racial segregation by refusing to integrate Black children into predominantly White schools. Willis was accused by critics of defying court-ordered desegregation, and keeping Black students in overcrowded inner-city schools despite there being significant extra capacity at schools located in White neighborhoods. Instead, to address overcrowding at predominantly Black schools on the city's South Side, Willis used 625 mobile classroom units, which critics pejoratively dubbed "Willis Wagons". The use of these mobile units was approved by the Chicago Board of Education in December 1961.

Between 1963 and 1965, civil rights leaders and others actively protested against Willis. Among those who led protests against Willis was Martin Luther King Jr. Protesters demanded his resignation. Protest actions included student boycotts of classes, hunger strikes, picketing outside of Willis' personal residence. Protests got destructive when protesters burnt mobile classroom units. During the 1963 March on Washington, thousands of Chicagoans marched down Pennsylvania Avenue to the chant of, "down with Willis". A notable protest was the 1963 Chicago Public Schools boycott. In 1963, future United States senator Bernie Sanders, was arrested while protesting segregation in the Chicago Public Schools. The 1969 U.S. Supreme Court case of Gregory v. City of Chicago related to charges against Dick Gregory stemming from his conduct during a 1965 protest demanding Willis' ouster as superintendent.

In 1961, Willis created a permissive transfer plan to allow students at schools with an average class size over forty to move to a school with an average class size under thirty. However, the transfer plan required that the families of students provide their own transportation. That year, he also conducted a survey of schools and quality of education on a three-member panel serving alongside Robert J. Havighurst and Eldridge T. McSwain.

In 1963, a lawsuit was filed by twenty parents of Black school children over Willis' refusal to integrate. Instead of going to trial, the Chicago Board of Education agreed to make an out-of-court legal settlement in which they would commission a study to recommend measures for integration. While approved in principle in 1964, the study's recommendations were never actually implemented.

Despite protests against him from civil rights leaders and others, Willis had strong backing from many White communities. They saw him as a prominent backer of the policy of "neighborhood schools".

=== Resignation ===
In 1965, there were arguments on the Chicago Board of Education over whether to renew his contract, as some board members wanted to end his tenure. Willis wanted an additional four-year term as superintendent. However, as a compromise, he agreed to a final one-year extension of his tenure. In May 1966, he announced his resignation, to be effective August 31, 1966, four months prior to the scheduled end of his term. Ahead of his departure, Mayor of Chicago Richard J. Daley praised Willis as, "a fine administrator and hard working public servant".

== Late career ==
From 1966 through 1970, he taught as a professor of educational administration at Purdue University Calumet. He also published the book Social Problems in Public School Administration in 1966.

=== Superintendent of Broward County Public Schools ===
Willis served roughly two years as superintendent of Broward County Public Schools, from 1969 through 1972 Willis retired in 1972, after the school board voted 3–2 not to renew his contract.

After retiring, he did some educational consulting work.

== Other positions held ==
In December 1947, United States Commissioner of Education John Ward Studebaker appointed Willis to the nine-member commission on life adjustment for the United States Office of Education. His fellow commissioners elected him the group's head a position he held for a number of years.

Willis was also a member of the President's Science Advisory Committee from 1962 through 1966.

In the 1960s, he served as chairman on a Congressional advisory committee to advise Congress on new federal legislation regarding vocational education. His work on this committee won praise from the National Vocational Association.

From 1955 through 1960, he was president of the Great Cities School Improvement Study. He was also president of the American Association of School Administrators in 1961 and 1962. He was chairman of the President's Panel of Consultants on Vocational Education, as well as chairman of the Educational Policies Commission of the National Education Association from 1962 through 1967. He was also a consultant to the Peace Corps.

== Personal life and death ==
On January 24, 1925, Willis married Rachel Davis Webster. He had one child.

Willis died of a heart attack at his residence in Plantation, Florida (where he had retired to) on August 27, 1988, at the age of 86.
