= Angeline Caruso =

American educator, educator administrator, school superintendent and biochemist

Angeline P. Caruso
- Caruso, 1976.

Superintendent of Chicago Public Schools
- Interim; December 13, 1979 – March 25, 1981
- Preceded by: Joseph P. Hannon
- Succeeded by: Ruth B. Love

Personal details
- Born: October 9, 1922 Chicago, Illinois, U.S.
- Died: November 8, 2000 (aged 78) Chicago, Illinois
- Education: Northwestern University
- Profession: Educator; education administrator; school superintendent

Angeline P. Caruso (October 9, 1922 – November 8, 2000) was an American educator, education administrator and former school superintendent. Caruso served as interim superintendent of the Chicago Public Schools district from December 13, 1979, until March 25, 1981. Although her position was as an interim, Caruso is noted as the first woman to hold the position.

== Early life and education ==
Caruso was a native to the South Side, Chicago, Illinois. Caruso would be a lifelong resident of Chicago. Caruso was educated in the Chicago Public Schools system, attending Burnside Elementary School and later Fenger High School; graduating in 1940. Caruso received a bachelor's degree from Chicago Teachers College in 1944, a master's degree in English from Northwestern University in 1950, and a doctorate in educational administration from Harvard University in 1962.

== Career ==
=== Chicago Public Schools ===
In the early 1940s, Caruso began working for Chicago Public Schools. For her first 17 years with the school district, Caruso worked as a teacher and a counselor. From 1961 to 1965, Caruso served as the principal of McDade Elementary School. From 1965 to 1968, she served as superintendent of District 25. Caruso became Chicago Public Schools' associate superintendent for curriculum and instruction.

=== Interim Superintendency ===
On December 13, 1979, the Chicago Board of Education voted to make Caruso the interim superintendent of Chicago Public Schools, making her the acting replacement for Joseph Hannon, who had resigned. The vote was contentious, as three members of the board walked out of the meeting, deriding the appointment as having actually been the selection of Chicago mayor Jane Byrne rather than the board's own choice. At the time she took office, the school district was described by the Chicago Tribune as being "practically broke" financially. After being appointed, she stated her aim was to provide "quality with austerity." Caruso stated that she was considering addressing the financial disarray of the school district by recommending great decreases in the number of employees and programs. She also stated that she was considering recommending that the district take the unprecedent action of renegotiating its contract with teachers.

In January 1980, Caruso proposed $60 million in cuts, which she conceded would force the school district to violate the terms of its contract with the Chicago Teachers Union. On January 23, the school board, by the narrowest possible margin, approved an initial $42 million in cuts, revised from an earlier proposal by Caruso that would have constituted $47.6 million of cuts. The cuts were strongly opposed by the Chicago Teachers Union. Caruso promised to put forth an additional $12 million in cuts, to meet her goal of cutting spending by $60 million.

At the end of January 1980, there was a work stoppage at the city's schools that arose in protest of the district's failure to pay school employees. Despite checks covering back pay being issued within days, at the start of February 1980, the work stoppage turned into a formal strike, when the members of the Chicago Teachers Union, by a 3-1 margin, voted to initiate what was the Chicago Public Schools' fifth teacher's strike in eleven years. The formal strike was in protest of the job and pay losses that were imposed by the $60.1 million spending cut plan of the district.

In April 1980, the district was threatened by United States assistant attorney general for civil rights Drew S. Days III with a lawsuit unless the it negotiated a plan with the United States Department of Justice by the early summer related to desegregating its schools. Caruso worked on negotiating with the United States Department of Justice. The chairman of the search committee for a permanent superintendent said that Caruso was among the six finalists for the position. Ruth B. Love was ultimately selected instead. On March 25, 1981, Ruth B. Love assumed the superintendency as a permanent appointee, ending Caruso's tenure as interim superintendent. After remaining with the school district for a brief period to aid Love with getting acclimated with the job, Caruso officially retired from working for the school district, after nearly 36 years. Upon her exit from the role of interim superintendent, the Chicago City Council voted unanimously to commend her work, which the Chicago Tribune called "the first unanimous act in Chicago school politics for a very long time, and probably the last for a long time."

== Other activities ==
Caruso served on the boards of directors for the National PTA and the Midwest Boys Club.

== Death ==
Caruso died November 8, 2000, at the age of 78 from complications stemming from heart disease.
