= Herold C. Hunt =

American educator and government official

Herold Hunt

2nd Under Secretary of Health, Education, and Welfare
- In office September 1955 – February 1957
- President: Dwight D. Eisenhower
- Preceded by: Nelson Rockefeller
- Succeeded by: John Alanson Perkins

16th Superintendent of Chicago Public Schools
- In office 1947–1953
- Preceded by: William Johnson; George F. Cassell (acting)
- Succeeded by: Benjamin Willis

Superintendent of Kansas City Public Schools

Superintendent of Schools for New Rochelle, New York

Superintendent of Schools for Kalamazoo, Michigan

Personal details
- Born: Herold Christian Hunt; February 8, 1902 Holland, Michigan, U.S.
- Died: October 17, 1976 (aged 74) Lexington, Massachusetts
- Education: University of Michigan (BA); Teachers College, Columbia University (MA)

Herold Christian Hunt (February 8, 1902 – October 17, 1976) was an American educator and government official who served as Superintendent of the Chicago Public Schools and 2nd Under Secretary of Health, Education, and Welfare. Hunt was also the Charles W. Eliot Professor of Education at Harvard University, president of the American Association of School Administrators, and chairman of the American Council on Education. He served on the National Board of the Boy Scouts of America, and was awarded the Silver Buffalo in 1963 for his contributions to scouting.

== Education ==
Hunt was born in Holland, Michigan and earned a Bachelor of Arts from the University of Michigan in 1923. While in college, he wrote for The Michigan Daily. He earned his M.A. degree from Teachers College, Columbia University.

== Career ==
He taught in the Michigan public schools from 1923 to 1927. He became principal of the St. Johns, Michigan high school for four years. In 1931 he became superintendent of that district, and in 1934 superintendent of the Kalamazoo, Michigan school system. In 1937, at age 32, he became head of the New Rochelle, New York School system.

He was Superintendent of the Kansas City, Missouri school system and president of the American Association of School Administrators from 1947 to 1948. While in Kansas City, he was known to fill in for vacationing Episcopalian ministers at the pulpit. In 1947, he was sought as Superintendent for the New York, San Francisco, and Chicago school systems. Chicago hired him as their first General Superintendent in charge of both operations and education in 1947. While in Chicago, he was credited with cleaning up a system rife with corruption. During the tenure of the previous permanent Superintendent. William Johnson, the district was blacklisted by the North Central Association of Colleges and Secondary Schools. Three days after the board unanimously confirmed Hunt as its new superintendent, the organization removed Chicago from its blacklist.

In Chicago, he doubled the school district's budget to $146 million, updated facilities with a $50 million building program, raised faculty salaries almost 50%, and relieved them from kickbacks to ward captains and ringing door bells in every election. Hunt was offered a salary of US$25,000 a year—US$9,000 more than it has ever paid a superintendent before, and US$7,000 more than it paid its mayor at the time.

He was second vice-president of National Congress of Parents and Teachers from 1948 to 1951, chair of the American Council on Education from 1948 to 1949, and chair of the Board of Trustees of the Educational Testing Service from 1949 to 1950.

In 1953 he accepted James B. Conant's offer to become the Charles W. Eliot professor of education at the Harvard Graduate School of Education, and resigned as superintendent. At the Harvard Graduate School of Education, he became the first Chairman of the Administrative Careers Program, which later led to programs in Administration, Planning and Social Policy. From 1955 to 1957, he served as Undersecretary of Health, Education and Welfare during the administration of President Dwight D. Eisenhower.

After he retired from his position as in the Department of Health, Education and Welfare, he returned to Harvard University. In 1958, he was selected as a recipient of the American Education Award. He served as a consultant to the Ford Foundation's program on the use of television in the schools, was a UNESCO delegate to New Delhi, a member of a delegation that visited Russian schools, and served on the board of the National Council of the Boy Scouts of America. During his time on the board, he served on a task force invited to take a look at the White Stag Leadership Development Program. He was instrumental in persuading the National Council President Ellsworth H. Augustus to conduct research into the program's potential contributions to adult and youth leadership development. He was cited for his contributions to Scouting and received the highest award given volunteers, the Silver Buffalo, in 1963. He retired from Harvard in 1970.

== Personal life ==
Hunt died on October 17, 1976, in Lexington, Massachusetts. He was 74.

== Publications ==
- Democracy Needs No Interpretation Education; November 1940, Vol. 61 Issue 3, p129-132, 4p
- Are the Public Schools Godless? (1952) with Muriel Stanek, in "Public Education Under Criticism" By Cecil W. Scott and Clyde Milton Hill Ayer Publishing, ISBN 0-8369-2520-3, p 142
- The Practice of School Administration: a Cooperative Professional Enterprise (1958) with Paul R. Pierce. Boston: Houghton Mifflin.
- The School Personnel Administrator (1965) Houghton Mifflin Comp.
