= Manford Byrd Jr. =

American educator and education administrator (1928–2021)

- Byrd Jr., 1987.

21st Superintendent of Chicago Public Schools
- In office March 25, 1985 – August 1, 1989
- Preceded by: Ruth B. Love
- Succeeded by: Ted Kimbrough; Charles D. Almo (interim)

Personal details
- Born: May 29, 1928 Brewton, Alabama
- Died: January 17, 2021 (aged 92) Chicago, Illinois
- Spouse: Cheribelle Byrd (m. 1956)
- Children: 3
- Education: Central College; M.A. Atlanta University; Ph.D. Northwestern University
- Profession: Educator; education administrator; school superintendent

Manford Byrd Jr. (May 29, 1928 – January 17, 2021) was an American educator and education administrator and former school superintendent. Byrd served as the 21st superintendent of the Chicago Public Schools district from March 25, 1985, until August 1, 1989. Byrd is noted as the first African-American man to serve as superintendent of the district (with the first African-American being a woman, his predecessor Ruth B. Love).

== Early life, education and career ==
Born on May 29, 1928, in Brewton, Alabama, to Manford Byrd Sr. and Evelyn (nee Turk). For high school, Byrd attended high school at Southern Normal High School; graduating in 1946. Byrd graduated from Central College (in Iowa) in 1949, with a bachelor's degree in mathematics. He would receive his Master of Arts in education from Atlanta University in 1954. Byrd would later receive a Ph.D. in education from Northwestern University in 1978. Byrd worked as an educator in Quincy, Illinois, in 1949, working there until 1954.

== Chicago Public Schools ==
=== Career ===
In 1954, Byrd began working for Chicago Public Schools. Byrd held various roles over the years, including teacher, assistant principal, elementary school principal, high school principal, and an assistant to the general principal. In 1968, Byrd was appointed deputy superintendent. At only the age of 39, this made him one of the highest-ranked African American public sector educational leaders in the United States. Byrd later was made deputy superintendent for instruction and deputy superintendent for pupil services and system-wide reorganization. Byrd was passed over several times for the role of superintendent. Many believed he was not selected due to his race. His family would later recount that he was told he had not been selected due to his lack of the Ph.D. Byrd earned a Ph.D. from Northwestern University in 1978. In March 1981, when Ruth B. Love was hired as the district's superintendent, many African Americans, including prominent figures such as Jesse Jackson, were critical that the job had not instead been given to Byrd. This sentiment came despite the fact that Love herself was African American. As Chicago Alderman Niles Sherman put it, "Ruth Love is not considered black at this moment by the black community".

=== Superintendency ===
On March 25, 1985, Byrd was appointed superintendent after the board voted not to renew Love's contract. During his tenure, in 1987, there was a teachers strike which lasted nineteen days, which, as of 2019, was the longest teachers strike in Chicago's history. Byrd was fired as superintendent on August 1, 1989. By this time, many black politicians, such as Jesse Jackson, argued that Byrd had been treated as a scapegoat. He was fired because he was seen as resistant to the decentralization plan that the state of Illinois had passed to restructure the school district.

== Later career ==
After leaving Chicago Public Schools he worked in private practice as an educational consultant.

== Board memberships and honors ==
Over the years Byrd sat on the boards of directors for the Chicago State University foundation, Joint Negro Appeal, Mid-America Chapter of the American Red Cross, Council of the Great City Schools, Chicago NAACP, and the United Church Board of World Ministries. Byrd also was a member of the boards of trustees for Central College and the Adler Planetarium. Byrd received more than 100 awards and commendations recognizing him for excellence in teaching and academic administration. This included honorary doctoral degrees from Central College, Hope College, and the National College of Education.

== Personal life and death ==
Byrd and his wife Cheribelle Byrd were married from March 31, 1956, until his death. Together they had three sons, Carl, Bradley and Donald. Byrd lived on Chicago's South Side. Byrd was a member of Trinity United Church of Christ, which has awarded a scholarship named for Byrd since 1982. Byrd died on January 17, 2021, at the age of 92, in Chicago.
