= Compton High School =

Public high school in California, US

Location
- 601 S. Acacia Avenue; Compton, CA 90220; United States; 33°53′28″N 118°13′38″W

Information
- Type: Public high school
- Opened: 1896
- School district: Compton Unified School District
- Principal: Larry Natividad
- Teaching staff: 55.54 (FTE)
- Enrollment: 1,297 (2023–2024)
- Student to teacher ratio: 23.35
- Colors: Columbia blue and white
- Mascot: Tarbabe
- Website: Compton HS
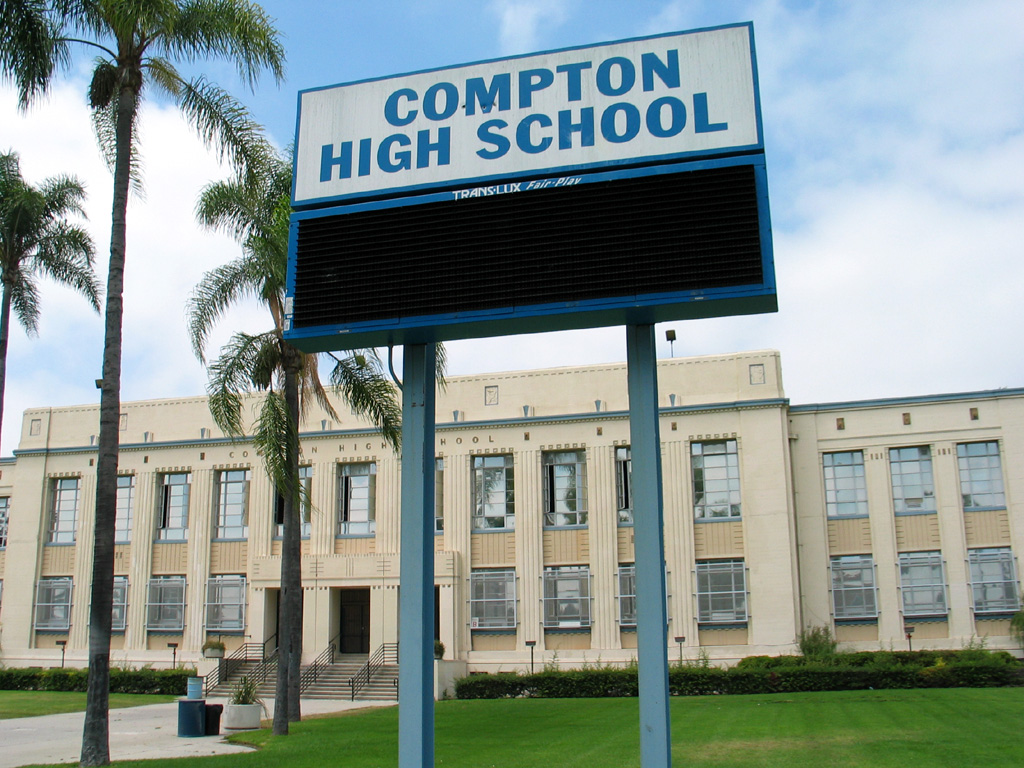
- The billboard of Compton High School in 2005

Ethnic composition as of 2020–21
Race and ethnicity	Total
Hispanic or Latino	81.6%
African American	16.7%
Other	0.8%
Pacific Islander	0.6%
Native American	0.1%
Asian	0.1%
Non-Hispanic White/Anglo	0.1%

Compton High School is a high school in Compton, California, United States, part of the Compton Unified School District.

== History ==
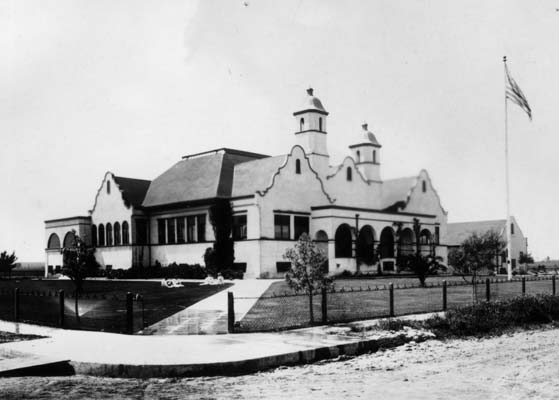
Compton Union High School in 1912

Compton Union High School opened in 1896. Both the high school and Compton Junior High School were severely damaged in the 1933 Long Beach earthquake. The school re-established as Compton Senior High School in the 1950s after Compton College separated from the high school district and opened its new campus at 1111 East Artesia Boulevard in 1953.

During the 1960s, there was a dramatic transition from a white student body to one which was predominantly African-American. Contrary to popular belief, Compton High School is hardly a "black" high school today. After the 1992 Los Angeles Riots, many black people left South Los Angeles and moved to the Antelope Valley, the Inland Empire, or the San Joaquin Valley. Today, Compton High School is over eighty percent Latino as Mexican immigrants settled in South Los Angeles.

== New campus ==
Ground broke on a new high school campus on May 7, 2022 and was opened for instruction for the 2025-2026 school year. Designed by DLR Group, the facility will feature a new performing arts center, academic building, and athletic facilities. New classroom spaces will provide Compton’s 2,500 students the opportunity to participate in programs such as Construction Manufacturing, Graphic Arts, A/V Technology, Communications, Robotics, and Culinary Arts. Additionally, there will be a new football/soccer stadium and outdoor swimming pool.

=== Dr. Dre donation ===
On June 15, 2017, Dr. Dre pledged to donate $10 million to the school for a 1200-seat performing arts theater.

== Mascot ==
Compton College's team nickname is the Tartars, named after the Turkic Tatars, so the team nickname for Compton High School became the "Tartar Babies". The mascot is "Baby Tartar", who wears a diaper and carries a big sword.

== Notable alumni ==
- Rod Barksdale: NFL wide receiver with Las Vegas Raiders and Dallas Cowboys
- Polly Bergen: movie, television and stage actress, singer, entrepreneur
- Reynaldo Brown: 1968 Olympic High Jumper while still at Compton
- Joe Cain: former NFL player
- Ken Carpenter: 1936 Olympic discus throw gold medal winner
- James Coburn: movie and television actor, Oscar winner
- Robin Cole: former NFL player
- Nadine Conner: opera star
- Aaron Craver: former NFL player
- David Croudip: former NFL player
- Johnny Davis: MLB player
- DeMar DeRozan: NBA player
- DJ Yella: DJ from the group N.W.A
- Eazy-E: rapper from the group N.W.A
- Jamaa Fanaka: independent filmmaker
- Marv Fleming: NFL tight end with Green Bay Packers and Miami Dolphins
- The Game: rapper
- Roddy Ricch: rapper
- William Hanna: animator and co-founder of Hanna-Barbera
- Tim Harris: former NFL player
- Ed Hervey: CFL All-star and general manager
- Roy Jefferson: NFL wide receiver with Pittsburgh Steelers, Baltimore Colts, and Washington Redskins
- Dean Jeffries: car designer and builder, movie stuntman
- Cornelius Johnson: 1936 Olympic high jump champion
- Datone Jones: NFL defensive end with Dallas Cowboys
- Freeman King: Comedian
- Don Klosterman: professional football player, general manager of LA Rams and other teams
- Jim Marshall: athlete, coach and scout with over 60 years in professional baseball
- Keb' Mo': blues musician and songwriter
- Louie Nelson: NBA player
- Violet Palmer: NBA official
- Walter Roberts: former NFL player
- Pete Rozelle: former NFL commissioner
- Troy Ruttman: racecar driver
- Hugo Salcedo soccer player and coach
- Woody Sauldsberry: basketball player
- Howard E. Scott: guitarist and co-founder of the funk band War
- Bobby Smith: former NFL player
- Duke Snider: Hall of Fame baseball player
- Walter R. Tucker, III: former mayor of Compton and congressman for the 37th District
- Iva Toguri: Second World War Japanese propaganda broadcaster
- William Cameron Townsend: Bible translator
- John William Finn: Congressional Medal of Honor recipient World War II.
- Ulis Williams: 1964 Olympian in track, President of Compton College
