= Mitch Johnson (American football) =

American football player (born 1942)

No. 64, 70, 74
- Positions: Tackle, Guard

Personal information
- Born: March 1, 1942 (age 84); Chicago, Illinois, U.S.
- Listed height: 6 ft 4 in (1.93 m)
- Listed weight: 251 lb (114 kg)

Career information
- High school: Compton (CA) Centennial
- College: UCLA
- NFL draft: 1965: 17th round, 229th overall pick

Career history
- Dallas Cowboys (1965); Washington Redskins (1966–1967); Los Angeles Rams (1969–1970); Cleveland Browns (1971); Washington Redskins (1972)*; Florida Blazers (1974)
- * Offseason or practice squad member only

Career NFL statistics
- Games played: 79
- Games started: 28
- Stats at Pro Football Reference

Mitchell Allen Johnson (born March 1, 1942) is an American former professional football player and businessman. Johnson played offensive tackle in the National Football League (NFL) for the Dallas Cowboys, Washington Redskins, Los Angeles Rams and Cleveland Browns. He played college football for the UCLA Bruins. He later served as a business executive.

== Early life and education ==
Johnson attended Centennial High School, before playing at the University of California, Los Angeles, where after playing on the Freshman team in 1960 and missing the 1961 season with an injury, he became a three-year letterman from 1962-1964, including two years as starter at left tackle. In addition to his talents as a blocker, his athletic ability allowed him to score two touchdowns on tackle-eligible plays. He graduated from UCLA in 1965 with a BA in Psychology.

== Professional career ==
=== Dallas Cowboys ===
Johnson was selected in the seventeenth round (229th overall) of the 1965 NFL draft by the Dallas Cowboys and became the first African-American offensive lineman to make the team in franchise history.

On August 30, 1966, he was traded along with Brig Owens and Jake Kupp, to Washington in exchange for Jim Steffen and a fifth round draft pick (#119-Willie Parker).

=== Washington (first stint) ===
In 1966, he was named the starter at left tackle. On September 3, 1968, he was placed on the injured reserve list with a dislocated hip and missed the season. On September, 9, 1969, he was traded to the Los Angeles Rams in exchange for two draft picks.

=== Los Angeles Rams ===
Johnson played two seasons as a reserve offensive tackle with the Los Angeles Rams. On August 11, 1971, he was traded along with a fifth round pick (#128-Greg Kucera) to the Cleveland Browns in exchange for Joe Taffoni.

=== Cleveland Browns ===
Although Johnson had previously announced his retirement, on July 31, 1972, he was traded to Washington along with a 1974 eighth round pick (#196-Darwin Robinson) in exchange for a 1973 third round pick (#54-Paul Howard).

=== Washington (second stint) ===
On September 14, 1972, he was moved from the regular roster to the taxi squad.

=== Florida Blazers ===
On June 23, 1974, he signed a contract with the Florida Blazers and played one season in the World Football League. He helped Tommy Reamon become one of the league's Tri- MVP's and its leading rusher.

== Business career ==
Johnson served as a member of the Board of Directors of the Federal Agricultural Mortgage Corporation (Farmer Mac) from 1997 through 2026. He previously served as a trustee of and director for the Advisors' Inner Circle Funds, the Advisors' Inner Circle Funds II, The Bishop Street Funds, and SEI Funds. Johnson formerly was President of MAJ Capital Management, Inc., an investment management firm that he founded in 1994 following his retirement from the Student Loan Marketing Association ("Sallie Mae"). During his 21 years with Sallie Mae, Johnson held numerous positions within that organization, including, for the seven years preceding his retirement, Senior Vice President, Corporate Finance. He has been a trustee of Citizens Funds, Rushmore Funds, and Diversified Funds. Johnson also served as a director of Eldorado Bancshares, Inc., the holding company for Eldorado and Antelope Valley Banks.
