= Ruth B. Love =

American educator, administrator and author (1932–2022)

- Love, photographed in 1981

20th Superintendent of Chicago Public Schools
- In office March 25, 1981 – March 30, 1985
- Preceded by: Joseph P. Hannon; Angeline Caruso (interim)
- Succeeded by: Manford Byrd Jr.

Superintendent of the Oakland Unified School District
- In office November 10, 1975 – February 28, 1981
- Preceded by: J. David Bowick
- Succeeded by: Robert Blackburn

Personal details
- Born: Ruth Burnett Love; April 22, 1932 Lawton, Oklahoma, U.S.
- Died: June 6, 2022 (aged 90) Oakland, California, U.S.
- Spouse(s): Phillip H. Goodwin (m. 1954; div. 1962) James A. Holloway (m. 1967; div. 1977)
- Education: B.A. San Jose State University; M.A. San Francisco State University; PhD United States International University
- Profession: Educator; education administrator; School Superintendent; Author

Ruth Burnett Love (April 22, 1932 – June 6, 2022), also known as Ruth B. Love-Holloway was an American educator, education administrator, author and former schools superintendent. Love was formerly a professor of education at her college alma mater San Francisco State University. Love served as superintendent of the Oakland Unified School District from November 1975 until February 1981 and the Chicago Public Schools from March 1981 until March 1985. Love was the first African-American to serve as superintendent for the Chicago Public Schools district. In 1983, Love received the Horatio Alger Award and a Candace Award for Education from the National Coalition of 100 Black Women. Love was named as one among 100 of the best school managers in North America by Educator Magazine in 1984.

== Biography ==
=== Early life and education ===
Born in Lawton, Oklahoma on April 22, 1932 (dispute other sources that cite her birth year as 1935 and 1939), Love was the second of five children born to Alvin E. (1911–1974) and Burnett C. Love (née Williams; 1912–1997), Love was raised in Bakersfield, California, after her family migrated there during the 1940s. Love became interested in being a teacher at an early age; following in the footsteps of her grandfather, Andrew A. Williams, who was a run-away slave at age twelve, and a teacher and founder of the first school for African Americans in Lawton, Oklahoma. Love attended Bakersfield High School, graduating in 1950. After high school, Love went on to study education at San Jose State University; receiving her bachelor's degree in 1954. Love later received her master's degree in Guidance and Counseling from San Francisco State University in 1959. In 1970, Love received her PhD in Human Behavior and Psychology from the United States International University, San Diego.

=== Career ===
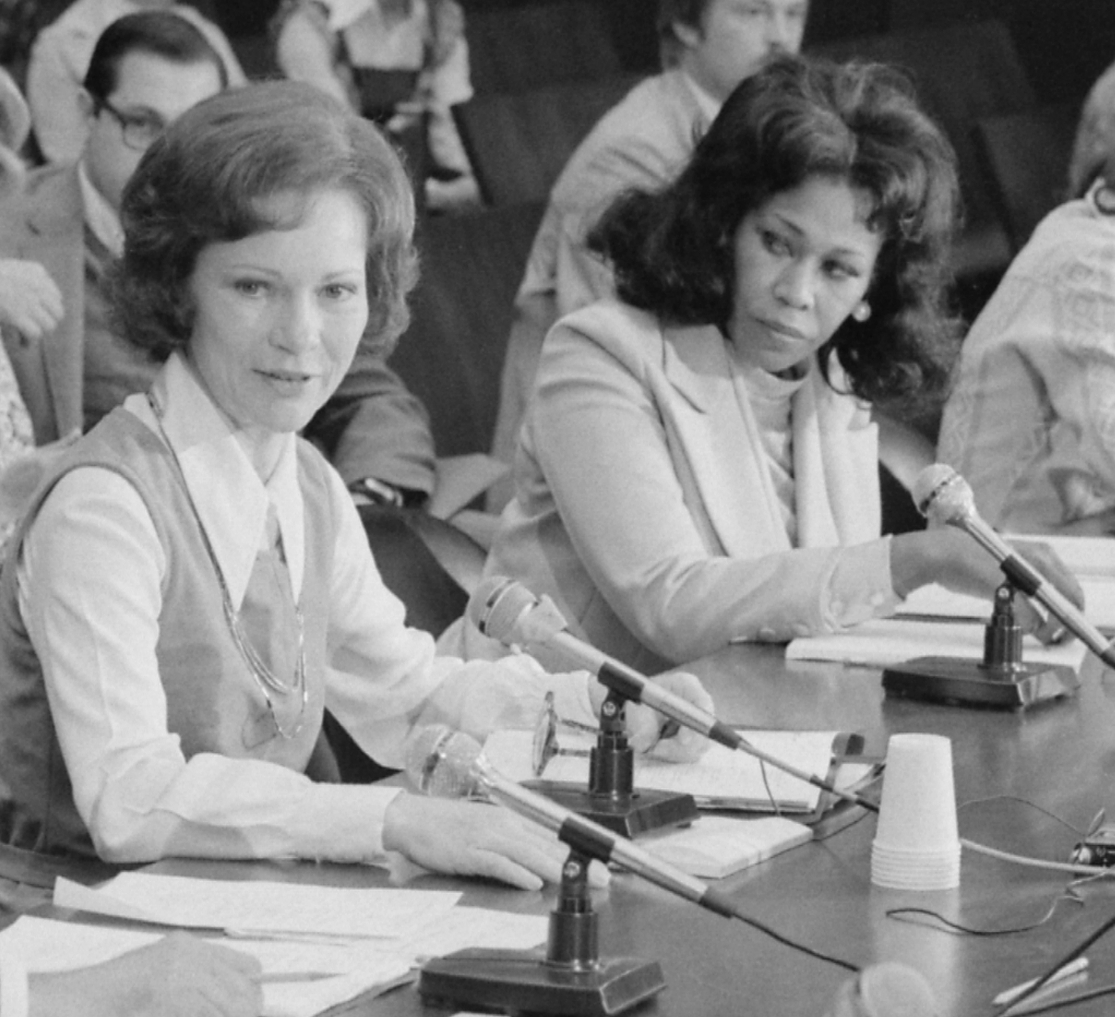
Love and Rosalynn Carter during a meeting in Chicago for the President's Commission on Mental Health on April 20, 1977.

Before beginning her tenure as school superintendent and during her career with Oakland Unified Schools District, Love was appointed to several different positions. Love was a consultant to the Bureau of Pupil Personnel Services; Director of the Bureau of Compensatory Education beginning in 1963 until September 1965. Love also served on the President's Mental Health Commission and board of directors for the National Urban League from December 1962 until 1970. In August 1971, Love was chosen as Director of The Right to Read program with the U.S. Office of Health and Education in Washington, D.C. by then-U.S. Commissioner of Education Sidney Marland where she served until resigning in April 1982, A year after beginning her tenure as superintendent of schools in Chicago. Love received an honorary doctorate literature degree from Atlanta University in May 1984.

==== Oakland School District ====
Love began her career in the education field becoming a teacher and adult education teacher with the Oakland Unified School District in 1960. In addition to becoming a teacher with Oakland schools, Love was a counselor and consultant for a Ford Foundation project. Love became a Fulbright Exchange Educator; participating in educational experiences in Ghana and England. Love was an exchange teacher sent to England in 1961. In November 1975, Love was appointed Superintendent of Schools for the Oakland Public School district after the assassination of superintendent Marcus Foster, who served as the first African–American to head the district. The school district at the time was made up of 55,000 students and $125 million budget. As superintendent, Love was signed to a $49,000 a–year contract. Love held that position for six years before resigning and accepting the job of Chicago superintendent of schools in February 1981.

===== Jonestown Tape =====
Among the tapes acquired by the FBI in the wake of the Jonestown massacre was tape Q718, a recording of a March 1979 broadcast regarding a trip that Love who was the superintendent of the Oakland Unified School District and California Congressman Ron Dellums took to Cuba in October 1977. It is unclear why the People's Temple recorded this broadcast. Jim Jones did have an active interest in education. According to Salon, Congressman John Burton lobbied to have Jones appointed to the Board of Regents.

==== Chicago Public Schools ====
Love was offered the job of superintendent of schools in Chicago by mayor Jane M. Byrne and school board members in December 1980. After a month of negotiating on a contract, Love accepted the offer on January 9, 1981, and began her job on March 25. At the time, Love was the highest paid local school official in the United States; under a $120,000–a year contract. The accepting of the job by Love received mixed responses from city school board members, community members and political leaders. Some school board members and black political leaders such as Jesse Jackson wanted Chicago schools deputy superintendent African–American Dr. Manford Byrd Jr. to serve as superintendent, to addition Chicago Public Schools language specialist Dr. Joann Roberts called Love "Overrated" and said she didn't have the proper concern for African–American children in Chicago. Despite that opposition, Love received support from numerous people including Reverend Jesse Jackson, who was quoted saying that her skills were "tailor-made" for the Chicago school district.

In May 1981, Love proposed the reinstating of the traditional grading system in the city's elementary schools. As superintendent, Love created and implemented the "Chicago Mastery Learning Program" during the 1981–82 school year. The program made it mandatory that all elementary school students' reading and math courses be taught in more than one area, with students given an unlimited time to learn one area of the subject, and achieving eighty-five percent to be promoted to the next grade. In November 1981 Love proposed Report Card Pick-Up, ordering only parents or guardians pick up student report cards from school, prior to previous years. Love implemented the "Adopt–a–School" program in which schools within the district received money, equipment and other support from specific individuals and corporations in January 1982. In March 1982, Love created an anti–vandalism incentive, which funds saved by reducing vandalism was given to schools for art subjects. Love created discipline codes within the district. In addition to instituting standardized testing into Chicago public high schools, Love began the Chicago High School Renaissance Program during the 1982–83 school year. The program served as an attempt to keep students performing at class level; basing the program studies in reading, writing and mathematics.

===== Bugging hoax =====
In April 1981, Love's chief deputy Charles Mitchell Jr. reported to the school board and the public that after an investigation by a Detroit private investigator; electronic devices had been found in Love's office and car. After the F.B.I and others tried to contact the investigator for more information about the search, Mitchell admitted that he fabricated the story. Mitchell said that a Chicago firm did search Love office and car, But they found nothing. Mitchell said he created the story for many reasons, most notably to discourage the possibility of future wiretaps and to test the effectiveness of the Chicago Police Department for Love's safety. Mitchell claimed it was all his idea and that Love knew nothing about the story being false. On April 23, 1981, Love held a news conference announcing Mitchell's resignation and publicly apologized to the school board and mayor Byrne: "I had no knowledge of this discrepancy when it was reported to the board and public. I apologize for bringing this embarrassment to the city and to the Chicago schools." People questioned Love's involvement in the hoax when Chicago Tribune reporter Vernon Jarrett quoted Love saying she had seen the electronic bugs herself and telling board members that she saw wires that led straight to Chicago's City Hall. Mayor Byrne referred to the bugging situation as "disgusting".

===== Love v. Byrne =====
During the Chicago mayoral election campaign in late–1982, Love chose not to attend public appearances with Byrne upon her request. Love stated that she objected to the mayor using her picture and name in her campaign literature. Despite being hired under the Byrne administration, Love decided not to identify herself as being connected to the administration; ultimately deciding not to endorse Byrne in her 1983 re–election bid. During an interview with Chicago Tribune reporter Vernon Jarrett, Jarrett asked Love was she the superintendent of school because Byrne chose her; Love was quoted saying "That is not my understanding. I have a pretty good knowledge of how I was chosen and of the individual school board members who had enough faith in me and my reputation to push for my appointment. I do not feel obligated to any public figure." After losing the vote to not serve as superintendent in July 1984, Love reached out to Byrne via. phone call in August 1984; asking her to sway board members who she had appointed to vote in her favor. Byrne stated to Love that her appointees were split in the contract votes and that she wouldn't intervene on their decisions.

===== CTU strikes of 1983 and 1984 =====
During Love's tenure as superintendent, There were two Chicago Teachers' Union strikes; one in 1983 that lasted 15 days and a 10-day strike in 1984. In the midst of a 15-day strike by the Chicago Teachers Union from October 3–18, 1983, At the time the longest teachers' strike in Chicago; Love was criticized by the union and teacher supporters as being "Ruthless and Loveless" for her approach to the union and her actions to open three schools despite the strike. Love claimed she made that decision for the sake of the high school seniors who would need credits to graduate. In statements to local news organizations, Love likened the tension between herself and the strikers at one school to being attacked by a group of "vicious dogs". The strike was ended with Love and the school board giving the teachers a 5% raise, 2.5% bonus and a one-year pact.

===== End of tenure =====
In July 1984, The school board made up of eleven members; three Hispanics, four Whites and four African–Americans voted 6–5 to not renew Love's contract as superintendent which expired in March 1985. Love sued the board and allies of mayor Harold Washington for $12 million, charging them with sexism and racism. Love claimed that her civil rights were violated when she was denied a new contract, charging that three Hispanic and white board members who voted against the renewal of her contract were racist in October 1984. Love asked a judge to order her re-instated by the Chicago Board of Education as superintendent under the guides Love claiming she had been removed from office in a discriminatory manner in November 1984. Love settled with the board out of court for an undisclosed amount.

=== Later career, personal life and death ===
Love became a commentator for a Chicago television station after her career superintendency ended. In 1987, Love conducted a consulting firm, RBL Enterprises LTD., of which she served as president, in California. In addition to the consulting firm, Love was the publisher of the Oakland Sun-Reporter, a now defunct local newspaper in Oakland, California. Love later served as a professor at her college Alma mater San Francisco State University until her retirement in 2014. Love was married twice and had no children. Her first marriage was to Phillip Holmes Goodwin from December 1954 until 1962. Love later married James A. Holloway in April 1967, they divorced in 1977. Love died on June 6, 2022, in Oakland, California, aged 90.

== Honors and tributes ==
In May 2015, Love was honored with a tribute at Lake Chalet in Oakland, California. Oakland mayor Libby Schaaf honored Love with a proclamation of April 26, 2015, as Dr. Ruth Love Day. Schaaf spoke about Love: "It is my esteemed honor to recognize the personal and professional contribution Dr. Ruth Love has made to Oakland and students around the world. In addition to her phenomenal lifetime of work, it is her extraordinary personal character that has made her such an enduring force for educational advancement and equity."

Educational offices
Preceded by J. David Bowick	Superintendent of Oakland Unified School District; 1975–1981	Succeeded by Robert Blackburn
Preceded by Angeline Caruso (interim)	Superintendent of Chicago Public Schools; 1981–1985	Succeeded by Manford Byrd Jr.
