= List of CEOs of Chicago Public Schools =

Chief Executive Officer of Chicago Public Schools
- Incumbent; Macquline King; Interim since June 20, 2025
- Inaugural holder: John Clark Dore (as "Superintendent")
- Formation: 1854 (as "Superintendent")

Chicago Public Schools is headed by a chief executive officer (CEO) appointed by the mayor of Chicago. The current interim CEO is Macquline King. This job is equivalent to a superintendent, and, before 1995, the occupant of this office was known as the "superintendent of Chicago Public Schools".

== History ==
The position of chief executive officer was preceded by one of "Superintendent". The first individual to hold this position had been John Clark Dore, who assumed the position in 1854. In 1855, the authority to remove the Superintendent was given to the Board of School Inspectors by the same ordinance which created the city's first high school, meaning the Chicago Common Council (today known as the "Chicago City Council") no longer held this authority.

The role of Superintendent, when established, did not have well defined duties. The office was originally subordinate to the Board of School Inspectors, and later the Chicago Board of Education (which supplanted the Board of School Inspectors in 1857). Its powers were limited. The role was, in part, shaped by its officeholders over the years. Since the ordinance which established the office did not require administrative authority to be given to the superintendent, there was no clear delineation of policymaking and administrative roles between the superintendent and the school board.

In practice, a stronger superintendency was developed, beginning under Edwin G. Cooley's tenure. However, it was not until the 1917 Otis Bill that the superintendency was granted exclusive administrative power over schools.

In 1995, the Government of Illinois passed the Chicago School Reform Amendatory Act, which replaced the position of superintendent with that of chief executive officer. The first individual to serve under the title of CEO was Paul Vallas.

== Officeholders ==
=== Superintendents of Chicago Public Schools ===
The following is a table listing the individuals that held the position of "superintendent of Chicago Public Schools" from its creation in 1854 through its dissolution in 1995.

Twenty-three individuals held the position on a permanent basis, while a further five served solely on an interim or acting basis.

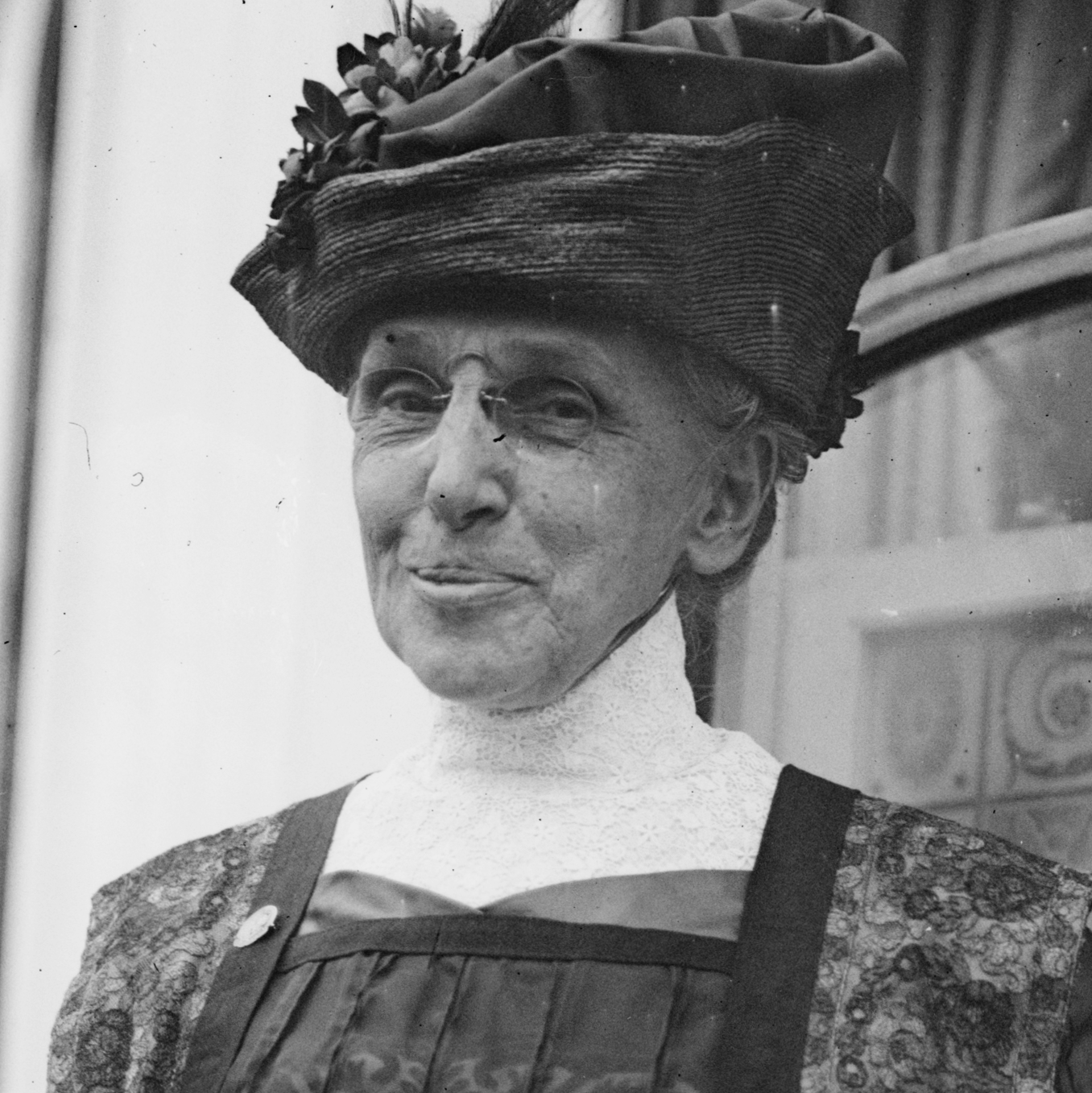
Ella Flagg Young (served 1909–1915); CPS' first female superintendent and the first female public school superintendent in a major US city

Name	Tenure	Citation
John Clark Dore	1854—1856	
William H. Wells	1856—1864	
Josiah Little Pickard	1864—1877	
Duane Doty	1877—1880	
George C. Howland	1880—1891	
Albert G. Lane	1891—1898	
Elisha Andrews	1898—1900	
Edwin G. Cooley	1900—1909	
Ella Flagg Young	1909—1915	
John Shoop	1915—1918	
Peter A. Mortenson (acting)	1918—1919	
Charles E. Chadsey	1919—1920	
Peter A. Mortenson	1920—1924	
William McAndrew	1924—1928	
William J. Bogan	1928—1936	
William Johnson	1936—1946	
George Cassell (acting)	1946–1947	
Herold C. Hunt	1947—1953	
Benjamin Willis	1953—1966	
Thaddeus Lubera (interim)	1966	
James F. Redmond	1966—1975	
Joseph P. Hannon	1975—1979	
Angeline Caruso (interim)	1979—1981	
Ruth B. Love	1981—1985	
Manford Byrd Jr.	1985—1989	
Charles D. Almo (interim)	1989—1990	
Ted Kimbrough	1990—1993	
Richard E. Stephenson Jr. (interim)	1993	
Argie Johnson	1993—1995	

=== Chief Executive Officers of Chicago Public Schools ===
The following table lists the individuals that have held the position of "chief executive officer of Chicago Public Schools" since it was created in 1995. Eight individuals have served as CEO on a permanent basis, while a further six have held the position solely on an interim or acting basis.

Name	Tenure	Citation
Paul Vallas	1995–2001	
Arne Duncan	2001–2009	
Ron Huberman	2009–2010	
Terry Mazany (interim)	2010–2011	
Jean-Claude Brizard	2011–2012	
Barbara Byrd-Bennett	2012–2015	
Jesse Ruiz (interim)	2015	
Forrest Claypool	2015–2017	
Janice K. Jackson	2017–2021	
LaTanya McDade (acting)	2021	
José Torres (interim)	2021	
Pedro Martinez	2021–2025	
Bogdana Chkoumbova (acting)	2025	
Macquline King (interim)	2025–present	

== See also ==
- List of presidents of the Chicago Board of Education
