= Corruption in Illinois =

Corruption in the US state of Illinois

Corruption in Illinois has been a problem from the earliest history of the state. Electoral fraud in Illinois pre-dates the territory's admission to the Union in 1818. Illinois had the third most federal criminal convictions for public corruption between 1976 and 2012, behind New York and California. A study published by the University of Illinois Chicago in 2022 ranked Illinois as the second most corrupt state in the nation, with 4 out of the last 11 governors serving time in prison.

== Federal ==
Several members of Illinois's delegation to the United States Congress have been convicted of crimes.

=== U.S. Senate ===
- William Lorimer (R) U.S. Senator from 1909 to 1912. The Senate voted that Lorimer's election used corrupt practices and vote buying and declared it invalid. He was then removed from office.
- Frank L. Smith (R) won the 1926 senatorial election. A month later, incumbent senator William B. McKinley died, and governor Len Small appointed Smith to fill the vacancy for several months before beginning his elected term. However, the U.S. Senate voted not to seat Smith due to excessive spending and "fraud and corruption" during his campaign. Among other things, Smith, who was the chairman of the Illinois Commerce Commission, was accused of accepting a $125,000 campaign contribution from Samuel Insull, the owner of public utility corporations that the ICC was charged with regulating.

=== U.S. House of Representatives ===
- Dan Crane (R), a U.S. congressman from 1979 to 1985, was censured in the 1983 congressional page sex scandal for having sex with a young congressional page. Crane was defeated for re-election in 1984 and returned to dentistry.
- Dan Rostenkowski (D) was a U.S. congressman from Chicago for 36 years, from 1959 to 1995. He was chairman of the House Ways and Means Committee from 1981 to 1994. After a federal investigation he was accused of various acts of corruption, such as accepting kickbacks, using official funds for personal expenses, and participating in what became known as the Congressional Post Office scandal. In 1996 he pleaded guilty to two counts of mail fraud and was sentenced to 17 months in prison.
- Dennis Hastert (R) was a congressman from 1987 to 2007. He was the longest-serving Republican Speaker of the House, from 1999 to 2007. In 2006, Hastert became embroiled in controversy over his championing of a $207-million federal earmark (inserted in the 2005 omnibus highway bill) for the Prairie Parkway, a proposed expressway running through his district. The Sunlight Foundation accused Hastert of failing to disclose that the construction of the highway would benefit a land investment that Hastert and his wife made in nearby land in 2004 and 2005. Hastert received five-eighths of the proceeds of the sale of the land, turning a $1.8 million profit in under two years. Hastert's ownership interest in the tract was not a public record because the land was held by a blind land trust, Little Rock Trust No. 225. There were three partners in the trust: Hastert, Thomas Klatt, and Dallas Ingemunson. However, public documents only named Ingemunson, who was the Kendall County Republican Party chairman and Hastert's personal attorney and longtime friend. Hastert denied any wrongdoing. In October 2006, Norman Ornstein and Scott Lilly wrote that the Prairie Parkway affair was "worse than FoleyGate" and called for the Speaker's resignation. In 2015, Hastert pleaded guilty to structuring bank withdrawals to evade bank reporting requirements, a felony. In 2016 he was sentenced to 15 months in prison. At his sentencing hearing, he admitted that he had molested several boys when he was a high school wrestling coach in the 1960s and 1970s, and that he had used the improperly withdrawn funds to buy the silence of one of the victims.
- Mel Reynolds (D) was a U.S. representative from 1993 to 1995. He resigned from Congress after being convicted of having sex with an underage campaign worker. While serving a five-year prison sentence, Reynolds was convicted in 1997 of unrelated charges of bank fraud and using campaign finances for personal expenses. He received a 6 1/2-year sentence but was released in 2001 when his sentence was commuted by President Clinton. In 2017 Reynolds was found guilty of failing to file federal income tax returns. He received a six-month sentence for this third conviction.
- Jesse Jackson, Jr. (D) succeeded Mel Reynolds as congressman from Illinois's 2nd congressional district, serving from 1995 until his resignation in 2012. On February 8, 2013, Jackson admitted to violating federal campaign law by using campaign funds to make personal purchases. Jackson pleaded guilty on February 20, 2013, to one count of wire and mail fraud. On August 14, 2013, he was sentenced to 30 months in federal prison.
- Aaron Schock (R) represented Illinois's 18th congressional district, serving from 2009 until 2015. In March 2015, after controversy about his use of federal funds, Schock resigned from Congress. In November 2016, a federal grand jury indicted Schock on 24 criminal counts including theft of government funds, fraud, making false statements, and filing false tax returns. Schock pleaded "not guilty" to all charges when arraigned on Monday, December 12, 2016.In March 2019, prosecutors reached a plea bargain with Schock suspending the case for six months and requiring him to be under court supervision. If he stayed out of legal trouble, all charges against him would be dropped in six months in exchange for him paying $42,000 to the IRS and $68,000 to his congressional campaign fund. As part of the deal, Schock's campaign committee, Schock for Congress, pleaded guilty to a misdemeanor count of failing to properly report expenses. The six months probationary period ended in September 2019, and all remaining charges against Schock were dropped.

== State ==
=== Governors ===
- Len Small (R) the 26th governor, serving from 1921 to 1929, was found to have defrauded the state of a million dollars.
- Otto Kerner, Jr. (D) was 33rd Governor of Illinois, serving from 1961 to 1968. Following a 1973 trial in which his prosecutor was future Illinois governor James R. Thompson, Kerner was convicted on 17 counts of mail fraud, conspiracy, perjury, and related charges. The federal bribery counts were dismissed. He was sentenced to three years in federal prison in Chicago and fined $50,000. Faced with almost certain impeachment, he resigned his position on the federal bench on July 22, 1974.
- Dan Walker (D) was the 36th Governor of Illinois, serving from 1973 to 1977. After leaving office he pursued various business interests, and acquired the First American Savings and Loan Association, which was later declared insolvent as part of the savings and loan crisis. In 1987 Walker pleaded guilty to bank fraud and perjury for receiving improper loans from First American. He was sentenced to seven years in prison, and was released after serving a year and a half.
- George Ryan (R) was the 39th governor of Illinois, serving from 1999 to 2003. Before that he was secretary of state from 1991 to 1999. In 2006 he was found guilty of fraud and racketeering charges for various acts that he committed in these two offices. He was sentenced to six and a half years in prison.
- Rod Blagojevich (D) was the 40th Governor of Illinois, serving from 2003 to 2009. He was the only Illinois governor to be impeached by the state House of Representatives and removed from office by the state Senate. In 2011 Blagojevich was found guilty of 18 counts of corruption, including attempting to sell or trade an appointment to fill Barack Obama's vacant seat in the U.S. Senate. He was sentenced to 14 years in prison. In February 2020, after he had served about eight years of his term, his sentence was commuted by then-president Donald Trump during his re-election campaign.

=== State officials ===
- Orville Hodge (R) was the Auditor of Public Accounts (predecessor office to the Illinois Comptroller) from 1952 to 1956. During his term in office, he embezzled $6.15 million of state funds, mainly by altering and forging checks that were paid on the state's account. Upon indictment, Hodge pleaded guilty to 54 bank fraud, embezzlement and forgery charges and was sentenced to a 12- to 15-year prison term, of which he served 6 1/2 years.
- Paul Powell (D) was the Secretary of State. Though his salary was never more than $30,000 per year, after he died in 1970, his hotel room was found to contain $750,000 in cash kept in shoe boxes, briefcases and strong boxes, while his office had $50,000 in cash as well as 19 cases of whiskey and $1 million in racing stocks. Powell left an estate of $4.6 million, which a federal investigation determined Powell had mostly acquired through bribes he received for giving noncompetitive state contracts to political associates.
- John F. Wall (R) State Representative from Chicago in District 23, was found guilty of conspiracy and attempted extortion for accepting a $2,000 bribe in exchange for laws benefitting private employment agencies. He was found guilty and sentenced to five years in prison. (1971)
- Walter C. McAvoy (R) State Representative from Chicago, was convicted of extorting a $2,000 bribe from private employment agencies in return for favorable legislation. He was found guilty and sentenced to five years in prison. (1978)
- William J. Scott (R) Attorney General convicted of tax fraud and sentenced to a year in prison (1982).
- Jerome Cosentino (D) served two nonconsecutive terms as Illinois Treasurer, from 1979 to 1983, and from 1987 to 1991. In 1992 he pleaded guilty to defrauding two banks of several million dollars in a check kiting scheme. He was sentenced to nine months of home confinement.
- Ron Stephens (R) State Representative from Greenville in the 102nd District, was arrested for DUI. He was found guilty, and since he had previous arrests for drug abuse, he was given 12 months of supervision, his license was revoked and he was required to take monthly drug tests. He then resigned his seat. (2010)
- Frank Mautino (D) was the Illinois Auditor General, the state's chief financial watchdog, from 2016 to 2026. In May 2017 his former legislative campaign was fined $5,000 for willfully failing to provide information to an investigation of the campaign's spending.
- Nick Sauer (R) State Representative from the 51st District, was accused by his ex-girlfriend of posting revenge porn pictures on a fake Instagram account. Top GOP leaders urged him to resign, which he did. (2018)
- Martin Sandoval (D) was a state senator and chairman of the Senate Transportation Committee. In 2020 he pleaded guilty to bribery and tax evasion, admitting that he had taken more than $250,000 in bribes in exchange for actions favorable to SafeSpeed, a red light camera company.
- Luis Arroyo (D) was a state representative. He resigned in 2019 after being charged with bribery for accepting payments to promote legislation favorable to the proliferation of sweepstakes machines. In 2021 he pleaded guilty. In 2022 he was sentenced to four years and nine months in prison.
- Terry Link (D) was a state senator from 1997 to 2020, when he pleaded guilty to income tax evasion. He also admitted to spending campaign finance money on gambling. In exchange for a lighter sentence, Link cooperated with the FBI in its case against Luis Arroyo (see above).
- Sam McCann (R) was a state senator from 2011 to 2019. In 2024 he pled guilty to wire fraud, money laundering and tax evasion for using more than $200,000 from his campaign fund for his own personal expenses. He was sentenced to three and a half years in prison.
- Tom Cullerton (D) was a state senator from 2013 to 2022 and former village president of Villa Park. He is also a distant cousin of former Illinois Senate President John Cullerton. In August 2019, he was indicted by a federal grand jury with 41 counts of corruption. In March 2022, he pleaded guilty to embezzlement charges and was sentenced to one year in prison in June 2022.
- Emil Jones III (D) has served as a state senator from the 25th district since 2009 and is the son of former Illinois Senate President Emil Jones Jr. In September 2022, he was charged with three counts of corruption related to his dealings with the scandal-plagued SafeSpeed red light camera company. He pleaded not guilty and his case went to trial, but ultimately resulted into mistrial in April 2025. He entered into a deferred prosecution agreement in December 2025 which he will avoid a second trial and would see his charges dropped in a year.
- Mike Madigan (D) was the speaker of the Illinois House of Representatives from 1983 to 1995 and from 1997 to 2021, a total of 36 years. In 2025 he was convicted of bribery, wire fraud, and Travel Act violations. A federal jury found that he had conspired to have ComEd officials pay $1.3 million to his allies over eight years in exchange for favorable treatment of legislation affecting the company, and had plotted to install former Chicago alderman Daniel Solis on a state board in exchange for Solis's help securing private business for Madigan's law firm.
- Carol Ammons (D) is a state representative from the Champaign/Urbana-based 103rd district, having served in that position since 2015. On July 8, 2026, Ammons and her husband, Champaign County Clerk Aaron Ammons, were charged by a federal grand jury with 11 counts of corruption including wire fraud, witness tampering, and lying to the FBI. Ammons is accused of orchestrating a scheme to receive illegal cash kickbacks and for misusing campaign funds

== Municipal ==
- In 1984, a federal task force known as Operation Greylord investigated corruption and malfeasance in the Cook County court system. Dozens of people, including judges, attorneys, police officers, and court officials, were eventually convicted of various crimes.
- In the 1990s, Operation Silver Shovel was an investigation by the Federal Bureau of Investigation into political corruption in Chicago. Eighteen individuals, including six aldermen, were convicted of crimes. "At its conclusion, Silver Shovel had uncovered everything from labor union corruption to drug trafficking and organized crime activity," according to the FBI.
- Fred Roti (D) served as an Illinois state senator (1951–1957). When his seat was lost to redistricting, he returned to precinct work, and took a patronage job as a drain inspector with the City Department of Water and Sewers. In 1990 Roti was indicted for racketeering and extortion. On January 15, 1993, after deliberating 2 1/2 days, a federal jury convicted Roti of taking thousands of dollars in bribes. The jury convicted him on all 11 counts of racketeering, racketeering conspiracy, bribery and extortion. The jury found him guilty of two out of three "fixing" charges, convicting him of taking $10,000 for influencing a civil court case and $7,500 to support a routine zoning change, both in 1989. But the jury cleared him of the most serious allegation, sharing $72,500 for fixing a Chinatown murder trial in 1981.
- Betty Loren-Maltese (R) was the town president of Cicero from 1993 to 2002. She was convicted of helping to steal $12 million from a municipal insurance fund, and in 2003 was sentenced to eight years in prison. Cicero police chief Emil Schullo was among several others who served time for participating in the same scheme.
- Nicholas Blase, mayor of Niles for from 1961 to 2008, resigned amid federal charges that he participated in an insurance kickback scheme. Several months later he pleaded guilty to mail fraud and tax evasion, and admitted that he had pressured local businesses to buy insurance from a friend's agency in return for a share of the commissions, receiving more than $420,000 over a period of more than 30 years. In 2010 Blase, then 81 years old, was sentenced to a year and a day in prison.
- Rita Crundwell (R), comptroller and treasurer for Dixon, was arrested for fraud in 2012 after embezzling about $54 million over many years. The money was used to support a lavish lifestyle and her horse ranch, the Meri-J. She pleaded guilty to wire fraud and was sentenced to 19 years and 7 months in prison.
- William Beavers (D) was a Cook County commissioner from 2006 to 2013. Before that he was a Chicago alderman from 1983 to 2006. In 2013 he was convicted of failing to pay taxes on hundreds of thousands of dollars he took out of his campaign fund and used for gambling and other personal expenses. He served a six-month sentence.
- Matt Sorensen (R) was chairman of the McLean County Board from 2007 to 2016. In January 2016, he was indicted on several counts of corruption in which he was accused of defrauding McKinsey & Company and State Farm (which is headquartered in Bloomington). He plead guilty to one count of wire fraud and was sentenced to one year in prison in January 2017.
- Eric Kellogg (D), mayor of Harvey, was called to be investigated by the State of Illinois over allegations of corruption and financial issues. The lawsuit also asked the court to invalidate the mayor's unilateral removal of several aldermen who opposed him.
- David Webb (R), mayor of Markham, pleaded guilty to charges of wire fraud and income tax evasion, in connection with a $300,000 bribery scheme. In 2021 he was sentenced to two years in prison.
- Donald Schupek, mayor of Posen, pleaded guilty in 2019 to embezzling $27,000 from the village when he was the mayor there.
- Jeff Tobolski (D) served simultaneously as a Cook County commissioner and as the mayor of McCook. In 2020 he pleaded guilty to multiple counts of extortion and bribery. In 2025 he was sentenced to four years in prison.
- Bob Kiely, former city manager of Lake Forest for around three decades, was charged and pleaded guilty to one felony count of official misconduct for funneling unauthorized payments to a lobbying firm aimed at getting Amtrak train service in the city.
- Louis Presta (R), the mayor of Crestwood, resigned in 2021and pleaded guilty to taking a $5,000 cash bribe for favorable treatment of SafeSpeed, a red light camera company that did business with the town. In 2022 he was sentenced to a year in prison.
- Tony Ragucci, mayor of Oakbrook Terrace from 2009 to 2020, pleaded guilty in 2022 to taking $88,000 in a red light camera kickback scheme.
- Charles Griffin, mayor of Ford Heights, was convicted in September 2024 of embezzlement. He was sentenced to four years in prison in January 2025.
- Tiffany Henyard (D), mayor of Dolton, was under investigation in 2024 over misused public funds. The investigation, led by former Mayor of Chicago Lori Lightfoot, revealed that the village's general funds had a negative balance of $3,650,000, with notice being drawn to overtime payments to three Dolton police officers and one-day spendings of $40,000 on unaccountable goods from Amazon.
- Titianna Ammons (D), chief deputy circuit clerk of Champaign County and daughter of state representative Carol Ammons, was charged with wire fraud by a federal grand jury in June 2026.
- Aaron Ammons (D), Champaign County Clerk since 2018, was charged with 11 counts of corruption along with his wife, state representative Carol Ammons, on July 8, 2026.

=== Chicago aldermen ===
According to The Economist's profile of Edward Burke, "Criminality among the city's 50 aldermen is also astonishingly common." Dozens of Chicago aldermen (city council members) have been convicted of corruption-related crimes.

- Thomas E. Keane (D), chairman of the Chicago City Council Finance Committee, was convicted in 1974 of mail fraud and conspiracy charges associated with questionable real estate deals. He was sentenced to five years in prison, and served a 22-month term.
- William Carothers was convicted in 1983 of extorting as much as $32,500 in remodeling work for his ward office from the builders of Bethany Hospital. He was sentenced to three years in prison.
- Edward Vrdolyak (D, then R) was an alderman from 1971 to 1987. In 2008 he pleaded guilty to conspiracy to commit mail and wire fraud for accepting a 1.5 million dollar kickback in a real estate scheme. He was sentenced to ten months in prison. In 2019 Vrdolyak pleaded guilty to charges of income tax evasion connected to the state of Illinois's tobacco lawsuit settlement in the 1990s. He was sentenced to another 18 months in prison.
- Isaac "Ike" Carothers (D) was an alderman from 1999 to 2010. He resigned after pleading guilty to accepting $40,000 in home improvements for backing a controversial project in his ward. He was sentenced to 28 months in prison. Isaac Carothers is the son of William Carothers, an alderman who was convicted of a similar crime in 1983.
- Arenda Troutman (D) was alderman of Chicago's 20th ward from 1990 to 2007. She was first appointed by Mayor Richard M. Daley and then re-elected several times. In January 2007, she arrested and charged with bribery. The FBI raided her home in order to carry out the arrest. In April 2008, she was formally indicted by a federal grand jury with 15 counts of corruption and, in August 2008, pleaded to one count of mail fraud and one count of tax fraud. In February 2009, she was sentenced to 4.5 years in prison.
- Ambrosio Medrano (D) was alderman of Chicago 25th ward and was charged with bribery by the FBI in June 2012. He previously was convicted of corruption as part of Operation Silver Shovel and pleaded to other bribery charges in 2010. He was convicted in September 2013 and was sentenced to 10.5 years in prison in January 2014. He was released early in May 2020.
- Willie Cochran (D), a former police officer, was elected alderman in 2007. In 2016 he was charged in a 15-count indictment with stealing funds "meant for poor children and seniors", taking bribes, and other crimes. In 2019 he pleaded guilty to one count of wire fraud. He was sentenced to one year in prison.
- Ricardo Muñoz (D) was an alderman from 1993 to 2019. In 2021 he pleaded guilty to wire fraud and money laundering, admitting that he had spent cash from a political fund on personal items such as sports tickets, meals and travel. In 2022 he was sentenced to 13 months in prison.
- Proco Joe Moreno (D) was alderman of Chicago's 1st ward from 2010 to 2019. He was first appointed by Mayor Richard M. Daley. In June 2019, he was indicted with insurance fraud and obstruction of justice. He plead guilty in July 2021 and was sentenced to 24 months of probation.
- Daniel Solis (D) was the alderman of Chicago's 25th ward from 1996 to 2019. He was first appointed by Mayor Richard M. Daley and then re-elected several times. In November 2018, the Chicago Sun-Times obtained access to a federal affidavit and reported that Solis was under federal criminal investigation over receiving bribes in the form of sex acts, Viagara, use of a luxury farm, and campaign contribution in exchange for advancing City Council actions related to his position as zoning committee chair. He struck a deal with federal investigators in which he recorded conversations between him and Ald. Ed Burke and Illinois House Speaker Michael Madigan in exchange for a lighter sentence. He was officially charged with bribery in April 2022, but his charges were dismissed in May 2025 as result of his deal with investigators leading to the conviction of Burke and Madigan in their respective corruption trials.
- Patrick Daley Thompson (D) is the grandson of Richard J. Daley and the nephew of Richard M. Daley, both of whom served as mayor of Chicago. Thompson was the alderman of the 11th Ward from 2015 to 2022. He resigned after being convicted in federal court of income tax evasion and of lying to regulators about a bank line of credit that he received. He was sentenced to four months in prison.
- Edward M. Burke (D) was the alderman of Chicago's 14th ward from 1969 to 2023, the longest-serving Chicago city council member in history. On December 21, 2023, in a federal trial, he was convicted of 13 counts of racketeering, bribery and attempted extortion. On June 24, 2024, he was sentenced to two years in prison.
- Carrie Austin (D) was the alderman of Chicago's 34th ward from 1994 to 2023. She was initially appointed by Mayor Richard M. Daley and re-elected several times. In June 2019, FBI agents conducted a raid on her 34th ward office. She was officially indicted in July 2021 on federal bribery charges. In July 2025, a federal judge ruled her medically unfit to stand trial. In October 2025, one of Austin's former top aides pleaded guilty to stealing food stamps.

== Agencies and organizations ==
=== Chicago Police Department ===
- In the 1980s and 1990s, former detective and commander Jon Burge was accused of torture, coercing false confessions, frameups, and other crimes and misconduct. He was hit with various civil suits and was then fired in 1993. In 2008, he was officially charged by U.S Attorney Patrick Fitzgerald with obstruction of justice and perjury. He was convicted in 2010 and sentenced 4.5 years in prison in 2011.
- In April 2001, former officer Joseph Miedzianowski was convicted of racketeering and drug conspiracy. His partner John Galligan and several drug dealers were also arrested. He was sentenced to life in prison without parole.

=== Chicago Public Schools ===
- In April 2015, Barbara Byrd-Bennett, the CEO of Chicago Public Schools, underwent a federal criminal investigation over a no-bid contract to a company she previously worked for, SUPES Academy. She decided to take a leave-of-absence as a result of the investigation and officially stepped down in June 2015. In October 2015, she was indicted on 23 counts of corruption along with several co-conspirators. She pleaded guilty to a $23 million kickback scheme. She was sentenced to 4.5 years in prison in April 2017.

=== Commonwealth Edison ===
- In July 2020, the U.S Attorney's Office in Chicago announced that Commonwealth Edison ("ComEd"), the primary electric utility company serving the Chicago area and the rest of Northern Illinois, agreed to pay a $200 million fine as a result of a federal criminal investigation that began in 2011 regarding an illegal bribery scheme. ComEd admitted to participating in a quid pro quo in which it offered jobs, subcontracts, and monetary payments to people with ties to "Public Official A" in exchange for the passage of bills in the Illinois General Assembly that would have a great impact on its operations and profits. Federal investigators stated that "Public Official A" controlled what measures came before a vote in the Illinois House of Representatives. While it wasn't explicitly stated, the description of "Public Official A" led people to suspect it was Illinois House Speaker Michael Madigan.
- In September 2020, former ComEd Vice President Fidel Marquez was charged with corruption by federal investigators. He negotiated a deal with the FBI to act as an informant in exchange for a lighter sentence.
- In May 2023, former ComEd CEO Anne Pramaggiore, former lobbyist Michael McClain, former ComEd executive John Hooker, and former president of the City Club of Chicago Jay Doherty were convicted on nine counts of bribery conspiracy, bribery, and falsifying records. The group were nicknamed the "ComEd Four". In April 2026, the 7th Circuit Court of Appeals ordered a new trial for the "ComEd Four" and ordered the release on bail of Michael McClain and Anne Pramaggiore from prison.
- In February 2025, in the trial United States v. Madigan, former Illinois House Speaker Michael Madigan was convicted on ten counts of bribery, wire fraud, and Travel Act violations as part of the overall ComEd bribery scheme. In June 2025, Madigan was sentenced to 7.5 years in prison and began serving his sentence in October 2025.

=== Evanston/Skokie School District 65 ===
- In October 2025, former superintendent of Evanston/Skokie School District 65 Devon Horton was indicted with 17 counts of corruption including wire fraud, embezzlement, and tax evasion. His trial is set for October 2026.

=== Lincoln-Way Community High School District 210 ===
- In September 2018, former superintendent of Lincoln-Way Community High School District 210 Lawrence Wyllie was indicted with five counts of corruption including wire fraud and embezzlement. In June 2024, his charges were dismissed due to health reasons.

=== Metra ===
- In April 2010, Phil Pagano, executive director of the Metra commuter rail agency serving the Chicago area, was investigated by the Metra Board of Directors for taking an unauthorized $56,000 bonus and an FBI investigation found that he embezzled $475,000 to pay for extramarital affairs and other personal finances. Pagano committed suicide by stepping in front of a Metra on the day the Metra Board of Directors were supposed to determine his future. The scandal led to the federal government restricting Metra access to federal funding sources.
- In June 2013, a much larger scandal ensued when Metra's chief executive officer Alex Clifford suddenly resigned without an explanation. It was discovered that several members of the Metra Board of Directors pressured him to step down and was given a $871,000 severance package, including a non-disclosure agreement. It was alleged that those Metra board members punished him for not participating in patronage hiring and promotion, which was allegedly orchestrated and demanded by Illinois House Speaker Michael Madigan. Clifford wrote a memo specifically accusing Madigan and board member Larry Huggins of pushing for special favors for job applicants and employees who were part of Madigan's political operation. Jack Schaffer, the only board member who voted against the severance package, called the deal "hush money". Five Metra board members, include Board Chair Brad O'Halloran, stepped down and a sixth board member refused to be reappointed. Illinois Governor Pat Quinn appointed a panel known as the Northeastern Illinois Public Transit Task Force aimed at addressing corruption at Metra and other transit agencies. Former U.S. Attorney Patrick Fitzgerald was a member of the panel.

=== University of Illinois at Urbana–Champaign ===
- In May 2009, a scandal, known as the University of Illinois clout scandal, erupted when investigatory articles by the Chicago Tribune reported that several applicants to the University of Illinois at Urbana–Champaign (UIUC), the state's flagship public university, "received special consideration" for admission between 2005 and 2009, despite not meeting the university's academic requirements and qualification standards. The investigation found that nearly 800 students over five years were placed on the "clout list" and that the admission of rate of those students were eight percentage points higher than the university average. Illinois Governor Pat Quinn appointed a panel to formally investigate the allegations. The investigation found that the university's Board of Trustees, University of Illinois System President B. Joseph White and UIUC Chancellor Richard Herman all acted improperly. White, Herman, and several trustees ended up resigning. Officials implicated in the scandal include Governor Rod Blagojevich, political operative Tony Rezko, and House Speaker Michael Madigan, among others.

== See also ==
- Corruption in Chicago
