= Federal Correctional Institution, Marianna =

Medium-security prison in Florida, US

Coordinates: 30°50′05″N 85°11′31″W

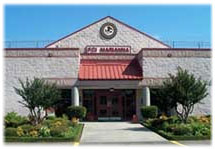
- Interactive map of Federal Correctional Institution, Marianna
- Location: Marianna, Florida
- Status: Operational
- Security class: Medium-security (with minimum-security female prison camp)
- Population: 1,300 (380 in prison camp)
- Opened: 1988
- Managed by: Federal Bureau of Prisons

The Federal Correctional Institution, Marianna (FCI Marianna) is a medium-security United States federal prison for male inmates in Marianna, Florida. It is operated by the Federal Bureau of Prisons, a division of the United States Department of Justice. The facility also includes an adjacent satellite prison camp for minimum-security female offenders. It lies adjacent to the Marianna Municipal Airport.

FCI Marianna is in the Judicial district of United States District Court for the Northern District of Florida, and is 65 miles (105 km) west of Tallahassee, the state capital.

== Notable incidents ==
In 2012, several dozen federal correctional officers who supervised inmates involved in a computer recycling program at FCI Marianna filed a lawsuit against the Federal Bureau of Prisons and its prison-owned industry, UNICOR, seeking compensation for illnesses and resulting quality-of-life losses they say they suffered from exposure to toxic dust generated in the process of recycling computers, which have components containing lead, cadmium, beryllium, mercury and possibly other toxic substances. The officers further allege that the Federal Bureau of Prisons failed to ensure that the program was being operated safely and did not have the proper safety measures in place. They had previously filed administrative claims in their case, but those were denied late last year. Having exhausted their options on the administrative pathway, the officers were then free to file the suit. Some inmates are also in the process of seeking remedy.

Also in 2012, two correction officers at FCI Marianna, Steven M. Smith, 28, and Mary S. Summers, 30, were charged with smuggling contraband, including marijuana, cellular telephones and tobacco, into the prison and to delivering it to inmates in exchange for cash payments. They subsequently pleaded guilty and were sentenced to prison.

== Notable inmates (current and former) ==
Inmate Name	Register Number	Status	Notes
Deryl Dedmon	16507-043	Serving a federal sentence of 50 years and a state sentence of life.	Pleaded guilty in 2015 to federal hate crime charges for committing a series of assaults on African Americans in Jackson, Mississippi in 2011, including the murder of James Craig Anderson; nine others also pleaded guilty and received sentences from 7 to 23 years.
Donna Langan (registered as Peter Kevin Langan)	64023-061	Serving a life sentence. Now at FMC Carswell.	Former leader of the Aryan Republican Army; convicted in 1997 of committing bank robberies using firearms and bombs in order to raise money to finance efforts to overthrow the US government and murder millions of Jewish people across the country.
Daniel Patrick Boyd	51765-056	Serving an 18-year sentence; initially scheduled for release in 2025. Transferred to FCI Allenwood Medium. Released in December 2024.	Ringleader of the Raleigh jihad group; pleaded guilty in 2011 to conspiracy to murder people in a foreign country for attending terrorist training camps in Pakistan and Afghanistan and recruiting men to engage in violent jihad.
Anne Pramaggiore		Serving a 2-year sentence at facility's minimum security women's prison. Released in April 2026.	Former Commonwealth Edison CEO who was a key leader in what WTTW described as a "conspiracy which sought to “corrupt the highest levels of state government,” with attempts being made to bribe former highly influential Illinois Speaker of the House Michael Madigan." She was convicted on 9 counts in 2023, though the 4 bribery counts were overturned after Snyder v. United States, and began serving a two-year sentence at facility's women's prison on January 12, 2026. Was later released on bail on April 15, 2026.
Harriette Walters	29155-016	Served a 17-year sentence; released on January 13, 2022.	Former tax manager for the Washington, D.C. City Treasury; pleaded guilty in 2008 to wire fraud, money laundering and tax evasion for issuing $48 million in false tax refunds to herself in the largest and longest-running embezzlement scheme in the city's history.

== See also ==
- List of U.S. federal prisons
- Federal Bureau of Prisons
- Incarceration in the United States
