= Kruesi =

Kruesi is a surname. Notable people with the surname include:

- Frank Kruesi (fl. 1997–2007)), American public transportation official
- John Kruesi (1843–1899), Swiss-born American machinist
- Mary Alice Kruesi, pseudonym of Mary Alice Monroe (born 1960), American author
