= Ron Huberman =

American businessman (born 1971)

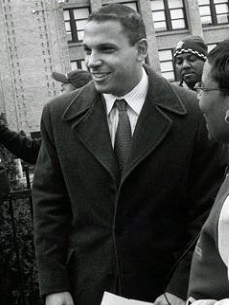
- Huberman at Harper High School, 2009.

3rd CEO of Chicago Public Schools
- In office January 28, 2009 – November 29, 2010
- Appointed by: Richard M. Daley
- Preceded by: Arne Duncan
- Succeeded by: Jean-Claude Brizard; Terry Mazany (interim)

President of the Chicago Transit Authority
- In office 2007–2009
- Appointed by: Richard M. Daley
- Preceded by: Frank Kruesi
- Succeeded by: Dorval Carter (acting)

Personal details
- Born: November 26, 1971 (age 54) Tel Aviv, Israel
- Education: University of Chicago (MBA, MSW); University of Wisconsin–Madison (BA)
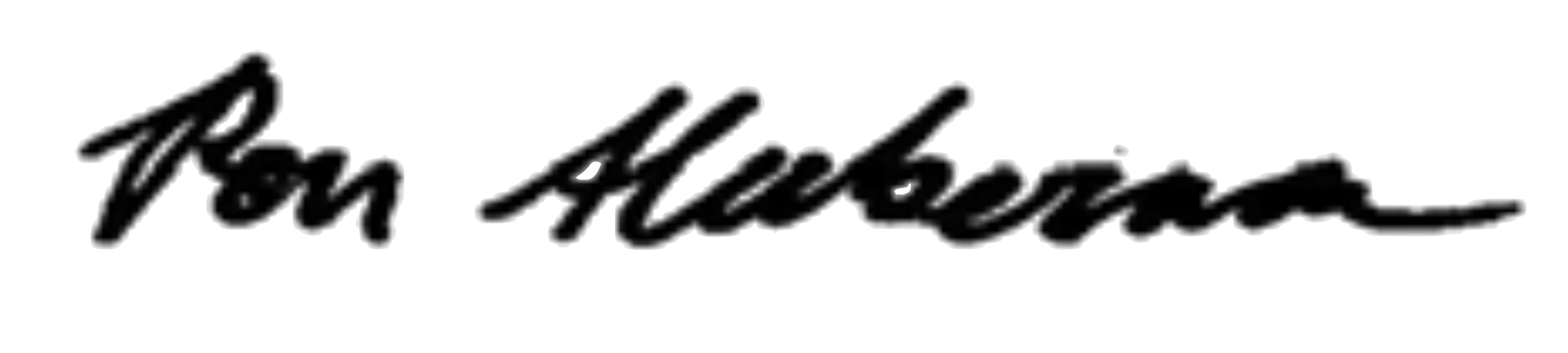
- Signature

Ron Huberman (born November 26, 1971) is an American entrepreneur and current CEO/Co-Founder of Benchmark Analytics, a provider of an evidenced-based public safety management system, featuring early warning and intervention analytics software for law enforcement agencies throughout the U.S. He spent 16 years in Chicago city government, with the first nine years in the Chicago Police Department. He started as a beat cop, advancing to Assistant Deputy Superintendent, where he created one of the country’s most advanced policing technology systems, including community-based strategies to help decrease crime on the streets. He also headed up Chicago’s Office of Emergency Management and Communications, bringing rapid change to that agency following the September 11 attacks on America. He is also the former chief executive officer and superintendent of Chicago Public Schools (2009–2010). Prior to heading the CPS, Huberman served as president of the Chicago Transit Authority.

== Early life and education ==
Born in Tel Aviv, Israel, on November 26, 1971, Huberman is the son of Holocaust survivors. He and his family moved to Oak Ridge, Tenn., when his father, a cancer researcher, began working at the Oak Ridge National Laboratory. Huberman attended the University of Wisconsin–Madison, graduating with a bachelor's degree in psychology and English in 1994. After graduation, he joined the Chicago Police Department where he initially served as a beat officer. While working full-time as a Chicago police officer, Huberman attended night classes at the University of Chicago and earned two advanced degrees in 2000, a Master of Social Work from the School of Social Service Administration (now Crown Family School of Social Work, Policy, and Practice) and a Master of Business Administration from the university's Graduate School of Business (now the Booth School of Business). Huberman was a recipient of The Paul & Daisy Soros Fellowships for New Americans and an Albert Schweitzer Fellow while attending the University of Chicago.

== Career in public service ==
=== Chicago Police Department ===
Upon his graduation in 1994 from the University of Wisconsin–Madison, Huberman entered the Chicago Police Academy and began his career in public service. He was initially assigned as a patrol officer in Chicago's Rogers Park neighborhood, and also served as a bicycle officer and as a tactical gang team officer. In partnership with the Illinois State Police, Huberman created and implemented the department's Citizen and Law Enforcement Analysis and Reporting (CLEAR) system, a unique and progressive technology-based criminal data and intelligence gathering system. In 1995, Huberman was promoted to Assistant Deputy Superintendent, becoming one of the youngest officers to reach exempt rank in the history of the Chicago Police Department. In this role, he led more than 600 sworn and civilian personnel who were charged with systematically improving the operations and strategic capacity of the department. As Assistant Deputy Superintendent, he commanded the following CPD divisions: Research and Development, Information Services, Records Services, and the Office of Information and Strategic Services. He also pioneered a pilot program for the installation and use of Police Observation Devices, also known as "blue-light cameras,"which gave the department a powerful new technological surveillance tool in its crime-fighting arsenal.

=== Office of Emergency Management and Communications ===
In 2004, Chicago Mayor Richard M. Daley appointed Huberman as Executive Director of the city's Office of Emergency Management and Communications. Tasked with protecting the city from terrorist attacks, public health crises, natural disasters, and responding to the city's 21,000-plus daily 911 emergency calls, Huberman developed the Operations Center within OEMC to help city services conduct a coordinated response to disaster scenarios and established Chicago as a leader in emergency preparedness. While at OEMC, Huberman greatly expanded the blue-light camera system throughout the city, which he had launched as a ranking police officer, to further boost the crime-fighting capacity in some of the city's high-crime areas. He also initiated the city's Traffic Management Authority, replacing sworn officers with civilian employees to manage high-traffic areas, thereby freeing needed police resources for law enforcement duties. Huberman supplemented the Traffic Management Authority with additional programs aimed at relieving congestion on busy urban streets, such as a "quick-tow" system, street sensors, smart signal timing and message boards. While at OEMC, Huberman also implemented a Performance Management system as a method of improving the organizational efficiency and outcomes of the agency. He would also use Performance Management, coupled with relevant data, as a key tool in later career assignments in identifying key issues and bringing effectiveness and employee growth and development to government.

=== Mayor Richard M. Daley's Chief of Staff ===
In 2005, Mayor Daley brought Huberman to the Chicago City Hall to serve as his chief of staff, delegating to him supervision of the city's day-to-day operations and instructing him "first and foremost … to help restore taxpayers' confidence in the integrity of city government" in the wake of wrongdoing in Chicago's Hired Truck Program. Huberman quickly instituted a hiring freeze while implementing new screening policies to prevent applicants from using political clout to get city jobs. He removed seemingly entrenched senior staff who failed to measure up to the standards required in securing and maintaining the public's trust. As Chief of Staff, he also oversaw settlement of the Shakman Decree, a decades-old federal court order, which governed political hiring for city jobs. Huberman implemented a performance management system for each of the city's 49 departments and agencies. Borrowing heavily from the private sector, Huberman's performance management system created a process for city management and service delivery. Similar to the New York City Police Department's COMPSTAT system, Huberman conducted weekly sessions that required each department to report on their key metrics.

=== Chicago Transit Authority ===
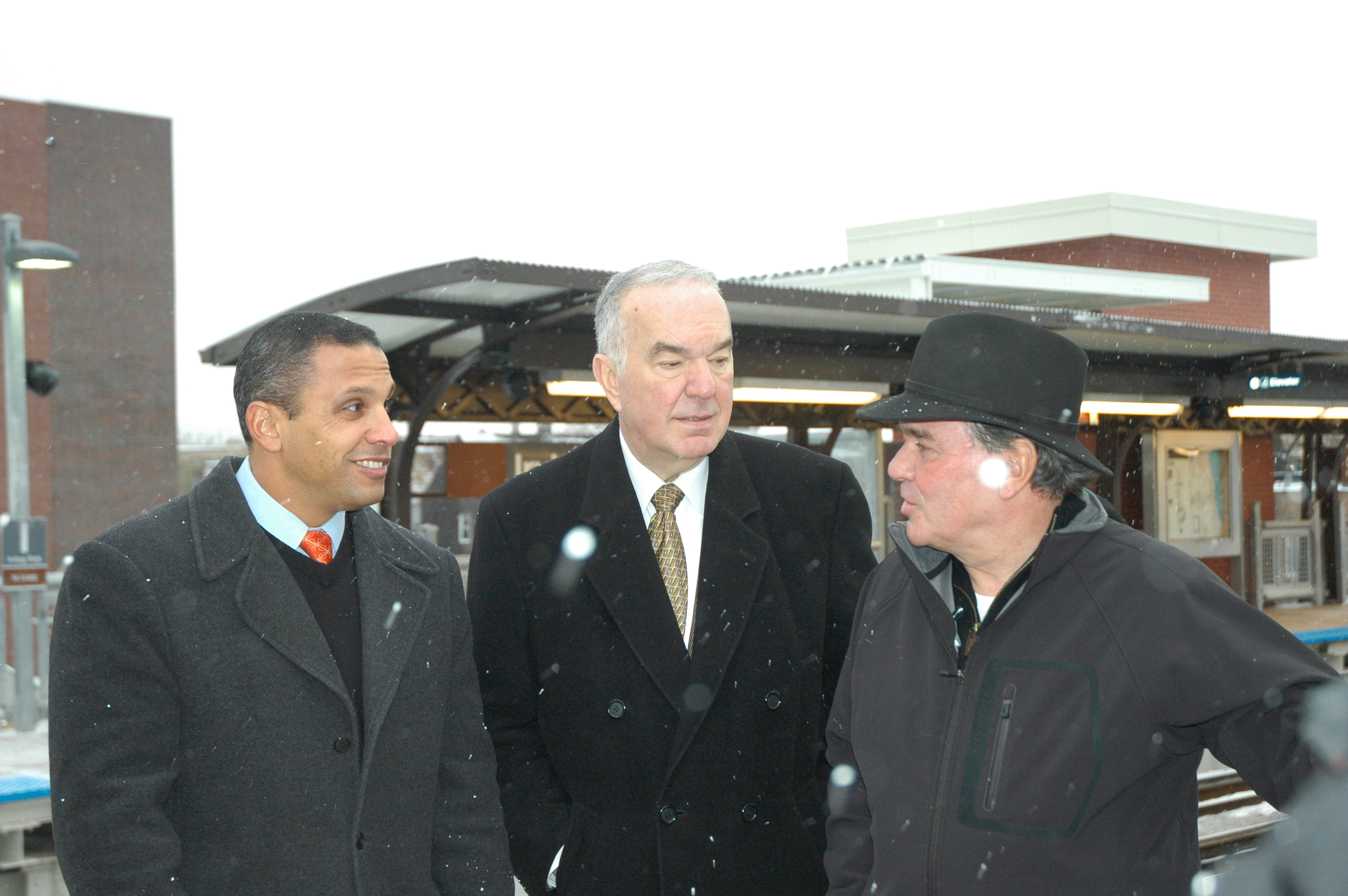
Huberman (left) with 47th ward Chicago Alderman Gene Schulter (center) and Mayor Richard M. Daley (right) at the December 2008 reopening of the Irving Park CTA Brown Line station

Following his role as chief of staff, Huberman was named by Mayor Daley to be president of the Chicago Transit Authority in 2007. His appointment to head the second largest public transit system in the U.S. was greeted as a "breath of fresh air" as Huberman pledged to press for better system-wide performance, employee accountability and an emphasis on customer service. Huberman addressed customer communication, oversaw investment in new rail-car and bus technology, and brought his Performance Management process to the agency. He mothballed a project that was running $100 million over budget, negotiated new labor contracts that saved the system more than $100 million and improved operations by significantly reducing "Slow Zones" on the system's rail lines, the "L", while increasing ridership. He also oversaw negotiations for long-term agreements with the CTA's 21 collective bargaining units which included pension and health care savings. Huberman, an avowed "L" rider during his tenure at the CTA, once removed an unruly and disorderly passenger from a train he was riding on after the rider verbally harassed a female passenger.

=== Chicago Public Schools ===
After President Barack Obama appointed then-CPS Chief Executive Officer Arne Duncan to be U.S. Secretary of Education, Mayor Daley selected Huberman to head CPS on January 28, 2009. Upon appointing Huberman, Mayor Daley stated, "I have utmost faith in him. I can go to sleep at night, and just close my eyes. I don't have to worry about Ron Huberman." His appointment was applauded for bringing to CPS an "innovative, creative and a hard-nosed manager who uses data to hold people and institutions accountable."

In his first few months leading the nation's third-largest school district, Huberman announced a shake-up of top management and warned that the system would have to drastically trim Central Office staff to cope with a financial deficit as high as $600 million. His determination to cut fat from the district's budget to cope with the deficit drew praise for "taking on its flabby bureaucracy – cutting the waste that anyone familiar with the school system can see."

Huberman also met regularly with educational experts early in his tenure and developed a set of strategic priorities – among them teacher retention and recruitment, safety and security, strengthening middle management, and pushing available resources to the local school level. He spelled out these priorities in a speech to the City Club of Chicago, avenue at which civic leaders gather once a month to hear from top figures in government, politics or business.

An advocate of year-round education, Huberman greatly expanded the number of schools that followed the district's "Track E" calendar which, among its benefits, helped curtail the traditional summer "learning loss" experienced by many students. During his tenure at CPS, he launched a pilot project to add 90 minutes of on-line learning at selected elementary schools. He also expanded virtual classrooms for students throughout the school system.

Huberman announced his signature safety and security initiative, which became known as "Culture of Calm," in early September 2009. It included establishing Safe Passage routes for students going to and from selected schools, mentoring for the most at-risk youth who were identified through a unique data-driven process, and boosting anti-violence supports at the local school level. The mentoring component and process for identifying the at-risk students were highlighted in Paul Tough's 2012 book, "How Children Succeed: Grit, Curiosity and the Hidden Power of Character." Following the recorded beating and tragic death of CPS high school student Derrion Albert later that month, the multi-dimensional approach was given top priority and drew widespread attention and praise as a "powerful idea on youth violence." Before the end of the 2009-10 school year, Huberman was able to announce promising trends from the program to the district's Board of Education.

Student achievement progressed during Huberman's term as the CPS CEO. Elementary school students showed continued to show improvement in meeting or exceeding state standards on annual assessments. Additionally, the percentage of Chicago Public Schools graduates going on to college continued to increase and the composite score of CPS high school students meeting or exceeding state standards in 2010 rose 1.5 percentage points from the previous year, from 27.9 percent to 29.4 percent, that gain amounting to a more than 5 percent increase in the meets/exceeds composite.

When reports surfaced that some CPS schools may have falsified or otherwise changed student test scores or their attendance rates, Huberman created safeguards within the district's overall record-keeping system to ensure the integrity of school-based data.

Huberman also oversaw the end of a long-standing federal consent decree that governed student admissions to its elite selective enrollment schools. He implemented a system that utilized U.S. Census data to construct socio-economic tiers of communities. Instead of race-based admission goals, a designated number of students from those socio-economic tiers would be admitted to the district's top schools in roughly equal numbers. The complex system guaranteed that students from all of the city's communities would be fairly represented in those schools. Huberman also launched an investigation into how students were admitted into the district's highly competitive selective enrollment schools when reports surfaced that some students may have been admitted to those schools outside of the authorized process.

==== Resignation from Chicago Public Schools ====
Huberman announced that he would resign as the CPS Chief Executive Officer on October 6, 2010. He said his decision was driven by the earlier announcement by Mayor Daley that he would not seek re-election in 2011. Huberman stepped down from the CEO post prior to the end of 2010. He was succeeded as CEO on an interim basis by Terry Mazany, president of the Chicago Community Trust.

=== City Council recognition ===
On January 13, 2011, Chicago City Council members unanimously approved a resolution honoring Huberman for his service to the citizens of Chicago. The resolution called Huberman "a dynamic leader who demonstrated a widely admired commitment to improving the city's public school system …" and described his successes at his other public service assignments: "A veteran public servant, Ron Huberman previously served from 2007 to 2009 as President of the Chicago Transit Authority where he instituted reforms at the agency and presided over a growth in ridership;" and "From 2005 to 2007, Huberman served as Chief of Staff for Mayor Richard M. Daley and was responsible for directing the operations of the City of Chicago's forty-nine departments and 39,000 employees;" and "From 2004 to 2005, Huberman served as Executive Director of the City of Chicago Office of Emergency Management and Communications and during his tenure expanded the number and types of technologies used to reduce crime and increase public safety;" and "Prior to his appointment as Executive Director at OEMC, Ron Huberman served for nine years at the Chicago Police Department, rising from a beat officer to Assistant Deputy Superintendent for Administration." The resolution also states that "the hard work, sacrifice and dedication of Ron Huberman serve as an example to all."

== Move to private sector ==
In January 2011, Huberman joined Prairie Capital, a private equity firm with more than $2 billion under management. Huberman also founded and chairs Teacher Match, a first-of-its-kind company that delivers on-line predictive hiring tools for the elementary and secondary schools and which utilizes a broad range of data sources to build its product. He is a trustee of the Chicago Rush Medical Center; a senior adviser of Alvarez & Marsal, LLC; and a Director of Navman Wireless UK Limited, Specialized Education Services Inc., and Haights Cross Communications.

== Academic work ==
In 2009, Huberman was given a Distinguished Alumni Award by the Booth Graduate School of Business/University of Chicago. Huberman also is a lecturer at the University of Chicago Law School, where he teaches a class he developed in "The Law, Policy and Politics of Policing." His published works include "Subject for Debate" and "The Future of Community Policing."

Preceded by Frank Kruesi	President of the Chicago Transit Authority; 2007–2009	Succeeded by Dorval R. Carter, Jr.
