= Willie Cochran =

Chicago politician

Member of the Chicago City Council from the 20th Ward
- In office May 21, 2007 – May 20, 2019
- Preceded by: Arenda Troutman
- Succeeded by: Jeanette Taylor
- Constituency: 20th Ward

Personal details
- Born: Willie B. Cochran; 1953 (age 72–73)
- Party: Democratic
- Education: Eastern Illinois University (BA)

Willie B. Cochran (born 1953) is an American politician and former Chicago Police Department officer. Cochran served as alderman of Chicago, Illinois' 20th Ward from 2007 until 2019.

== Early life, education and career ==
Cochran was born one of ten children to Jasper and Gessner Cochran. Cochran graduated from Eastern Illinois University in 1975 and received his MPA from Illinois Institute of Technology. Cochran served in the Chicago Police Department from 1977 until 2003, rising from patrol-man to sergeant.

== Aldermanic career ==
Cochran was elected alderman for the 20th ward of the City of Chicago in 2007, unseating Arenda Troutman with 63% of the vote. Cochran was subsequently reelected in 2011 and 2015. Cochran did not seek reelection in 2019, after being indicted on a federal charge. Cochran's ward included Woodlawn, Washington Park, and Englewood, Grand Crossing, and Back of the Yards

=== Corruption ===
In December 2016, Cochran was charged in a 15-count indictment for stealing funds "meant for poor children and seniors". According to the Associated Press, Cochran was to plead guilty in 2018. On March 21, 2019, at the Everett McKinley Dirksen United States Courthouse in Chicago, Cochran pleaded guilty to one count of wire fraud for misusing campaign funds for gambling and other personal expenses. Under the plea agreement, Cochran faced a sentence of 12 to 18 months in prison or probation. Cochran was sentenced to one year in prison on June 24, 2019 and reported to prison on August 23, 2019.

== See also ==
- Corruption in Illinois
