= Jean-Claude Brizard =

American school superintendent

4th CEO of Chicago Public Schools
- In office May 30, 2011 – October 11, 2012
- Preceded by: Ron Huberman; Terry Mazany (interim)
- Succeeded by: Barbara Byrd-Bennett

Superintendent of Rochester City School District
- In office January 1, 2008 – May 13, 2011

Personal details
- Born: January 12, 1963 (age 63) Port-au-Prince, Haiti
- Spouse: K. Brooke Stafford (m. 1992)
- Children: 4
- Education: Queens College, City University of New York
- Profession: Educator; Education Associate with Bill and Melinda Gates foundation
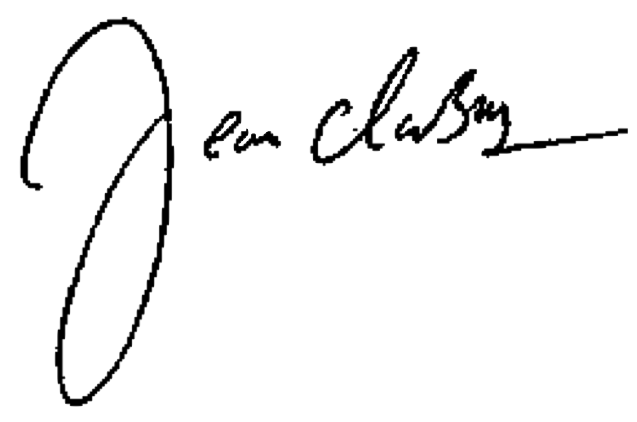
- Signature

Jean-Claude Brizard (born January 12, 1963) is an American former school superintendent. He was chief executive officer of Chicago Public Schools from 2011 to 2012. Directly before coming to Chicago, Brizard was the superintendent of the Rochester City School District. Brizard is best known as an education reformer, a strong charter school advocate and a champion of labor reform, particularly in regards to limiting teacher tenure status. He is a former senior advisor and deputy director of the Bill and Melinda Gates Foundation, where he specialized in education. Brizard started his career as a teacher, then an administrator, in the New York School System. He is currently president and chief executive officer of Digital Promise Global.

== Early life and education ==
Brizard was born in Port-au-Prince, Haiti. Dictator François Duvalier had his grandfather imprisoned and his parents fled to the United States when it was learned his father might be imprisoned as well. After reuniting with his family, Brizard attended public schools in Brooklyn and earned a bachelor's degree in chemistry and a master's degree in Science Education from Queens College and a master's degree in School Administration and Supervision from the City College of New York.

== Career ==
Brizard began his career as an instructor at Rikers Island, later moving to George Westinghouse Career and Technical Education High School, where he taught physics and became principal in 1999. In 2003 he rose to the instructional superintendency of Region 8, New York City Department of Education. He attended the Superintendents’ Academy of the Broad Center for the Management of School Systems in 2007. In total, he had a 21-year career with the NYC Department of Education.

=== Rochester City School District ===
In 2008, he assumed the superintendency of the Rochester City School District. In Rochester, he promoted charter schools and merit pay, pushed for performance standards, and met with so much opposition from the teachers’ union that they gave him a vote of no confidence before he left for Chicago.

=== Chicago Public Schools ===
Brizard was nominated by Rahm Emanuel to be CEO of Chicago Public Schools on May 6, 2011. His appointment was approved by the Chicago Board of Education on May 25, and he took office on May 30. He stepped down after 17 months on October 11, 2012. In a written response Brizard stated he and the Mayor had come to a "mutual agreement" that he was a "distraction" to school reform. Rumors of Brizard's resignation were first reported by several news organizations on August 31, 2012, but were denied by Mayor Emanuel directly. The possibility of an impending resignation first surfaced in July 2012, when portions of Brizard's personnel evaluation were leaked to the press. The leaks raised concerns about his ability to manage such a large organization as CPS and turnover of his leadership team. In August 2012, the Chicago Teachers Union went on strike for the first time in more than 25 years. The policies of Brizard and Mayor Emanuel were cited as the impetus for the strike. As part of his resignation package, Brizard received a year's salary at $250,000 along with other undisclosed benefits.

== Awards and honors ==
In 2023, Banga was named by Carnegie Corporation of New York as an honoree of the Great Immigrants Awards.

In 2024, he received the Aspen Institute's John P. McNulty Prize for his work with Anseye Pou Haiti.

Educational offices
Preceded by	Principal of the George Westinghouse Career and Technical Education High School; June 1999 – 2003	Succeeded by
Preceded by	Region 8 Instructional Superintendent, New York City Department of Education; 2003 –	Succeeded by
Preceded by William C. Cala	Superintendent of the Rochester City School District; January 1, 2008 – May 13, 2011	Succeeded by Bolgen Vargas (interim)
Preceded by Terry Mazany (interim)	CEO of Chicago Public Schools; May 30, 2011 – October 11, 2012	Succeeded by Barbara Byrd-Bennett
