= Terry Mazany =

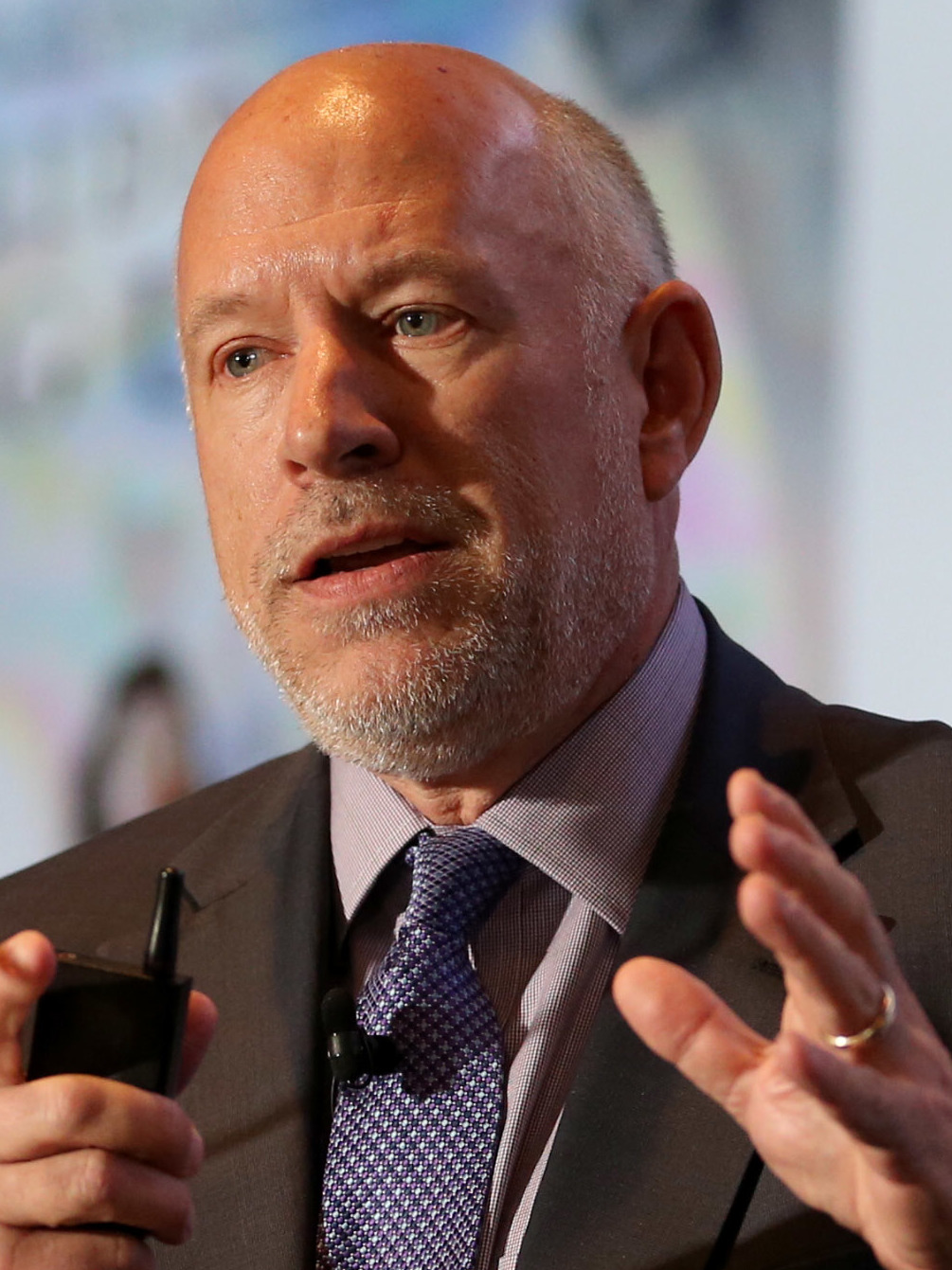
- Mazany in 2017

Interim CEO of Chicago Public Schools
- In office November 30, 2010 – May 2011
- Mayor: Richard M. Daley; Rahm Emanuel
- Preceded by: Ron Huberman
- Succeeded by: Jean-Claude Brizard

Personal details
- Education: University of Arizona
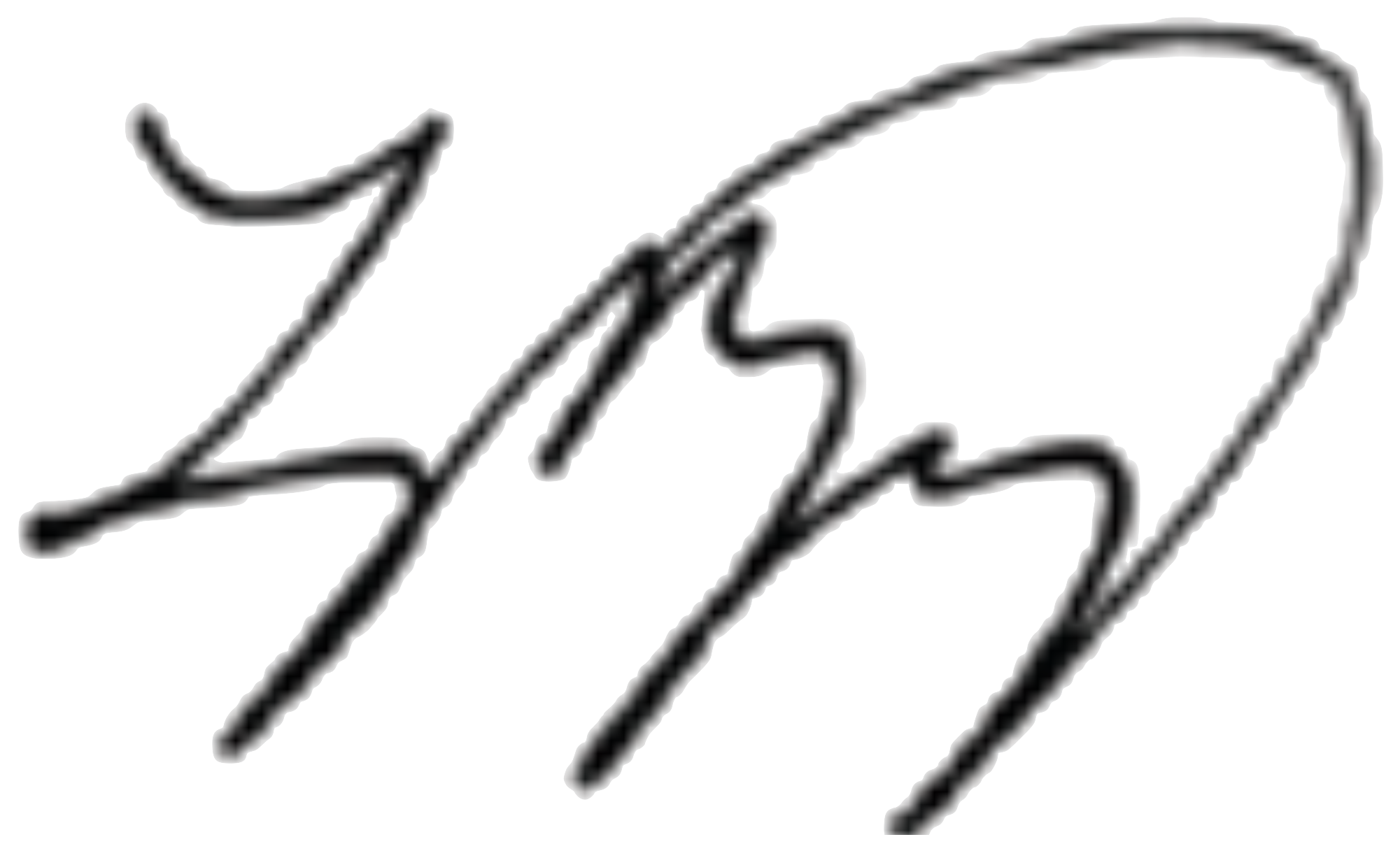
- Signature

Terry Mazany is an American philanthropist and administrator who served as president and CEO of the Chicago Community Trust and as interim CEO of Chicago Public Schools.

== Early life and education ==
Mazany obtained master's degrees in both business administration and anthropology from the University of Arizona.

== Career ==
Mazany became involved in education in the 1980s, citing the 1983 book A Nation at Risk as his inspiration for doing so. Mazany has worked in public education for school districts in the cities of Baltimore, Chicago, Detroit, Oakland, and San Francisco. For three years, he worked for the California School Leadership Academy. Mazany served as superintendent of curriculum and instruction for the Oakland Unified School District.

In approximately the year 2000, Mazany moved from California to Chicago in order to work in the field of philanthropy there. He began working for the Chicago Community Trust in 2001 as a senior program officer for their education fund. In this position, he led the planning an execution of the $50 million five-year commitment of the trust to support education and schools in the city. From 2004 through 2011, he served as its president and chief executive officer. He was only the sixth executive of the nonprofit in its century history.

Chicago mayor Richard M. Daley had Mazany organize and lead the Recovery Partnership, which had involved in than 50 foundations in helping the distribution of more than $1 billion in American Recovery and Reinvestment Act in the city. He held this role from 2009 through the following year, when the partnership ended its mission.

In November 2010, Mayor Daley announced that he would be nominating Mazany to serve as the interim CEO of Chicago Public Schools, replacing Ron Huberman, who had announced that he would retire by November 29. Mazany made it known that he had no intention of seeking the position permanently, and planned to have a short tenure, with a permanent CEO being named by May. On November 17, the Chicago Board of Education passed a resolution to appoint Mazany as CEO, effective on November 30, 2010. Mazany's tenure ended in May 2011, when permanent CEO Jean-Claude Brizard took office.

Mazany has also served in leadership rooms with the Smithsonian Science Education Center, the National Assessment Governing Board (including a tenure as its chairman), and the Community Foundation for Greater Atlanta.

== Honors ==
Mazany has received honorary doctorates from DePaul University and Lewis University.
