= Barbara Byrd-Bennett =

American educator and criminal (born 1949)

Barbara Byrd–Bennett

5th CEO of Chicago Public Schools
- In office October 11, 2012 – June 15, 2015
- Preceded by: Jean-Claude Brizard
- Succeeded by: Jesse Ruiz (interim); Forrest Claypool

Superintendent of Cleveland Municipal School District
- In office September 23, 1998 – August 17, 2006
- Preceded by: Louis J. Erste (interim)
- Succeeded by: Lisa Marie Ruda (interim)

Personal details
- Born: Barbara Louise Byrd; July 27, 1949 (age 77) Harlem, New York, U.S.
- Spouse(s): Leonard Franklin (m. 1969; div. 1977) Bruce Bennett (m. 1988)
- Children: Nailah K. Byrd–Suggs
- Education: Long Island University (BA); New York University (MA)
- Occupation: Educator; Education administrator; school superintendent
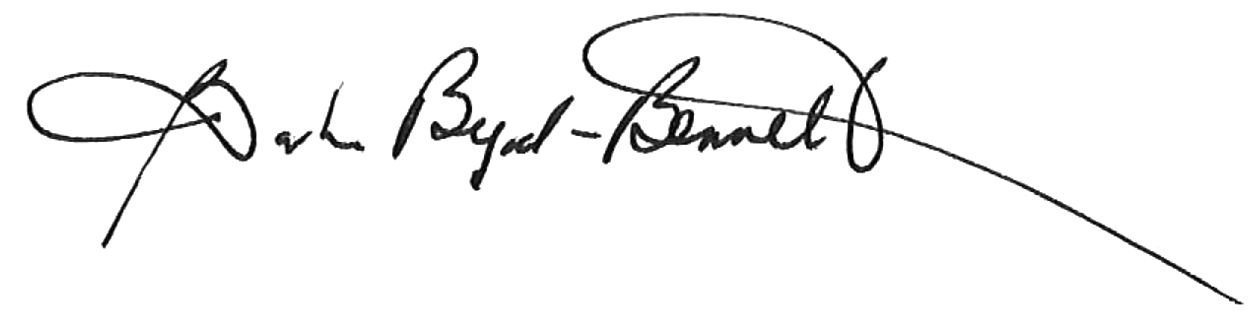
- Signature

Barbara Louise Byrd–Bennett (born July 27, 1949) is an American educator, education administrator, former school superintendent and convicted felon. Byrd-Bennett is the former chief executive officer of the Chicago Public Schools (CPS) and the Cleveland Municipal School District. She was CEO of the Cleveland schools from 1998 to 2006. From 2009 to 2011, she was the academic and accountability officer for the Detroit Public Schools system. She was hired as the chief education advisor for CPS in April 2012 and then named CEO by Chicago Mayor Rahm Emanuel six months later.

She resigned from CPS in 2015 amid a bribery investigation, which led to her pleading guilty to multiple charges. In 2017, Byrd-Bennett was sentenced to 4 1/2 years at Federal Prison Camp, Alderson in West Virginia. She was released from prison and placed on home confinement in May 2020.

== Background ==
Born in Harlem, Byrd-Bennett was the first of two daughters born to Helen Lee. Byrd-Bennett graduated from high school at age 15. After high school, Byrd-Bennett began studying at Long Island University where she received a Bachelors of Arts in 1969. In addition to her B.A., Byrd-Bennett has a Master’s of Science from Pace University, and a Master’s of the Arts from New York University.

Byrd-Bennett also holds honorary doctorate degrees from Cleveland State University, Baldwin Wallace College, John Carroll University and the University of Notre Dame.

== Federal criminal investigations and conviction ==
The indictment against Byrd-Bennett

=== Detroit Public Schools ===
In 2012, federal agents began investigating Barbara Byrd-Bennett’s role in a $40 million textbook contract that was awarded while she worked in Detroit. The deal was similar to a later one in Chicago in that both involved companies for which Byrd-Bennett had previously worked. No charges have resulted from the Detroit investigation.

=== Chicago Public Schools ===
In April 2015, Byrd-Bennett took a personal leave as Chicago Public Schools CEO during an investigation into a $20.5 million no-bid contract that had been awarded to SUPES Academy, a professional development organization she used to work with as a consultant. She resigned in June 2015 and had been on paid leave since April.

In October 2015, a federal grand jury in Illinois returned a 23-count indictment against Byrd-Bennett and two co-conspirators.

On October 8, 2015, the US Attorney handling the case announced that Byrd-Bennett would plead guilty to charges that she set up a kickback scheme in which she steered no-bid CPS contracts worth more than $23 million to her former employer, SUPES Academy, which would pay her 10% of that amount. Her former boss, the owner of SUPES, also promised Byrd-Bennett a job after she left her CPS post, trust accounts funded with $127,000 for each of her twin grandsons, and other perks. It was reported that the US Attorney's office found incriminating evidence against Byrd-Bennett, including an email to the SUPES owner that said, "I have tuition to pay and casinos to visit." She had pushed parties aggressively to secure the corrupt deals.

Byrd-Bennett pleaded guilty on October 13, 2015 in federal court. In exchange for her cooperation prosecutors agreed to request a sentence of 7 1/2 years in prison, which is below the federal sentencing guidelines. She agreed to delay her sentencing until after the charges against her co-defendants were resolved. On April 28, 2017, she was sentenced to 4 1/2 years in prison. On August 28, 2017, Byrd-Bennett began serving her sentence at Federal Prison Camp, Alderson, nicknamed "Camp Cupcake," in West Virginia. In May 2020, Byrd-Bennett was released from prison and was placed on home confinement.

The CPS Inspector General's report for 2020 detailed more instances of Byrd-Bennet's misconduct, leading the district to act against several vendors and their executives. The report said "the Byrd-Bennett investigations revealed one of the most exceptional cases of an official’s abuse of public trust in CPS’s history."

== Personal life ==
Byrd-Bennett has been married twice and has one daughter. In 1969, She married Leonard Franklin in New York. She gave birth to their daughter, Naliah, in January 1972. Byrd-Bennett divorced Franklin in 1977.

Byrd-Bennett has been married to Bruce Bennett since 1988. Byrd-Bennett's daughter, a former prosecutor, has been the Cuyahoga County, Ohio, Clerk of Courts since 2015.

== See also ==
- Political corruption in Illinois

Educational offices
Preceded by Louis J. Erste (interim)	Superintendent of Cleveland Metropolitan School District; 1998–2006	Succeeded by Lisa Marie Ruda (interim)
Political offices
Preceded by Jean-Claude Brizard	CEO of Chicago Public Schools; 2012–2015	Succeeded by Forrest Claypool
