= Jeanette Taylor =

American politician (born 1975)

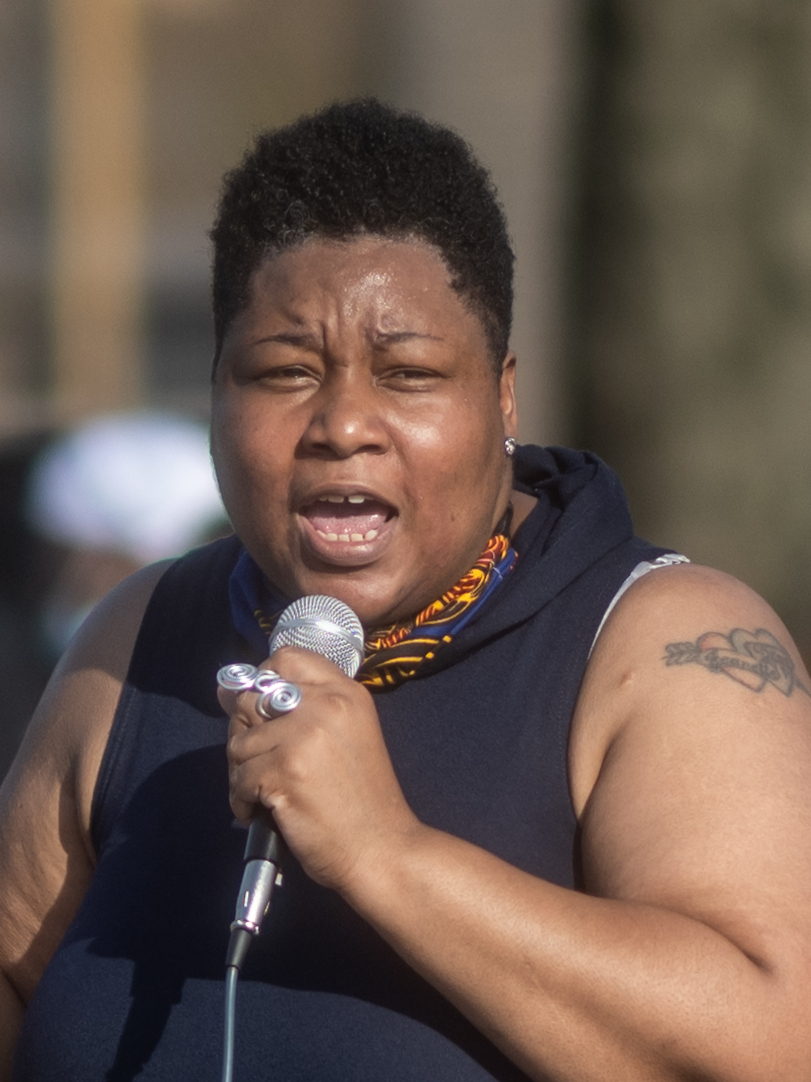
- Taylor in 2020

Member of the Chicago City Council from the 20th Ward
- Incumbent
- Assumed office May 20, 2019
- Preceded by: Willie Cochran

Personal details
- Born: Jeanette Beatrice Taylor; May 15, 1975 (age 51) Chicago, Illinois, U.S.
- Party: Democratic
- Website: www.ward20th.com

Jeanette Beatrice Taylor (born May 16, 1975) is an American politician and community organizer. Taylor is the alderwoman of Chicago, Illinois' 20th ward, taking office as a member of the Chicago City Council in May 2019. She won an open race to succeed outgoing alderman Willie Cochran in the 2019 Chicago aldermanic elections. She is a member of the Democratic Socialists of America.

== Early life and career ==
Taylor was born in Chicago on May 15, 1975. Her parents were a clerk at Chicago Public Schools and a taxi driver. For high school, Taylor attended Dunbar Vocational High School. At age 19, Taylor was elected as a member of the local school council for Mollison Elementary School, where her son attended school, and served in that position for over 20 years. She has been an organizer at Kenwood Oakland Community Organization, and is a member of People United for Action and United Working Families. In 2015, Taylor led a hunger strike that successfully protested the proposed closure of Dyett High School.

== Chicago City Council (2019–present) ==
Taylor took office as a member of Chicago City Council on May 20, 2019. In July 2019, Taylor and fellow alderman Leslie Hairston introduced a Community Benefits Agreement (CBA) ordinance aimed at protecting affordable housing near the proposed Barack Obama Presidential Center development. The ordinance gained the support of nearly 30 aldermen, but in January 2020, the Lightfoot administration announced that it would support a scaled-back version. Taylor opposed the scaled-back version and reiterated support for the initial CBA ordinance. In July 2020, a compromise ordinance was formulated after negotiations between Lightfoot's administration, aldermen Taylor and Hairston, and community groups. Taylor called the compromise ordinance a "step in the right direction" and called for further action.

In November 2019, Taylor was one of eleven aldermen to vote against Mayor Lori Lightfoot's first budget. She joined all five other members of the Socialist Caucus in signing a letter to Lightfoot which criticized her budget for "an over-reliance on property taxes" and "regressive funding models" that are "burdensome to our working-class citizens, while giving the wealthy and large corporations a pass."

== See also ==
- List of Chicago alderpersons since 1923
