= Commonwealth Edison =

Electric company in Illinois

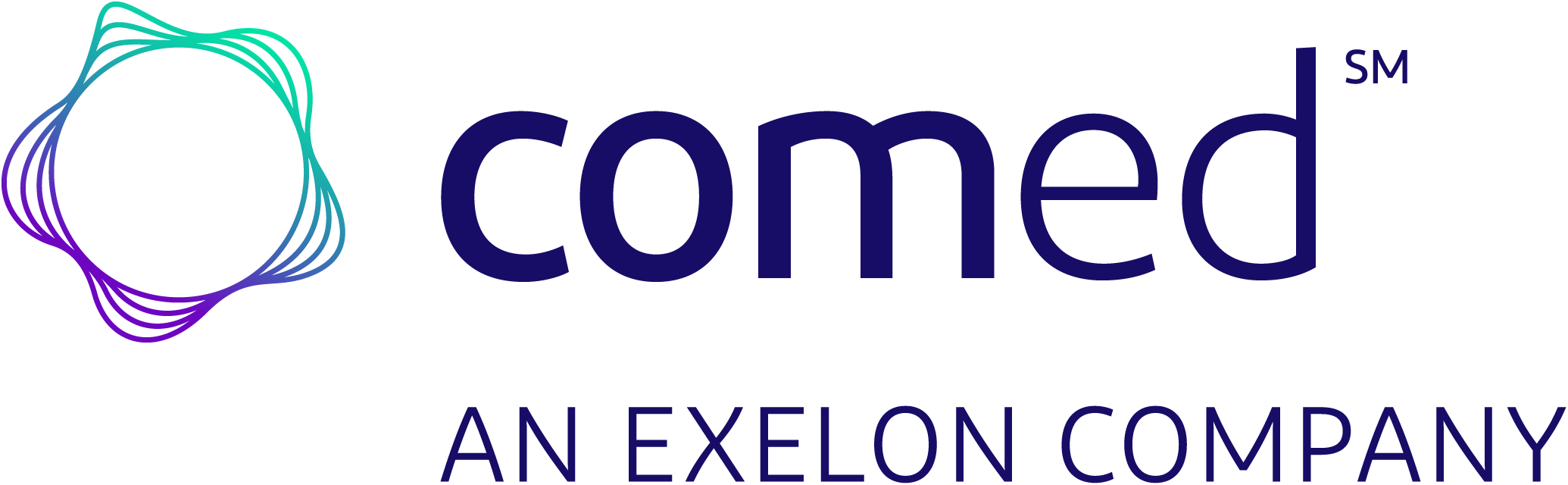
- Type: Subsidiary
- Founded: 1907; 119 years ago
- Headquarters: Chicago, Illinois, U.S.
- Key people: Gil C. Quiniones (CEO)
- Operating income: US$1.806 billion (2025)
- Parent: Exelon
- Website: comed.com

Commonwealth Edison, commonly known by syllabic abbreviation as ComEd, is the largest electric utility in Illinois, and the primary electric provider in Chicago and much of Northern Illinois. Its service territory stretches roughly from Iroquois County on the south to the Wisconsin border on the north and from the Iowa border on the west to the Indiana border on the east. For more than 100 years, Commonwealth Edison has been the primary electric delivery services company for Northern Illinois. Today, ComEd is a unit of Chicago-based Exelon Corporation, one of the nation's largest electric and gas utility holding companies. ComEd provides electric service to more than 3.8 million customers across Northern Illinois. The company's revenues totaled more than $7 billion in 2023.

As of 2015, ComEd has interconnections with We Energies, ITC Midwest, Ameren, American Electric Power, Northern Indiana Public Service, and MidAmerican Energy Company (MEC).

== History ==
=== Founding ===
The earliest predecessor of Commonwealth Edison was the Isolated Lighting Company, established in early 1881 by George H. Bliss as a subsidiary of Thomas Edison's company to sell small Edison-patented generators and lighting systems, each serving one building or several nearby buildings. In 1882, this company was taken over by the Western Edison Light Company, which was chartered by several prominent Chicagoans to not only take over Isolated Lighting's role as Edison's agent in Chicago, but also to develop a central station electric system. Western Edison installed the first incandescent lighting in a Chicago home, that of stockholder John W. Doane, in 1882, and it was first lit on November 10 of that year.

=== Chicago Edison ===
In March, 1887, John M. Clark (president of Western Edison), Robert Todd Lincoln, and John B. Drake obtained a franchise from Chicago to distribute electricity in the downtown area, bounded by North Avenue, 39th Street, and Ashland Avenue. They then formed the Chicago Edison Company, which took over all of Western Edison's business on July 2, 1887. Chicago Edison's first central generating station, designed by chief engineer Frederick Sargent, opened at 139 (later 120) West Adams Street in August, 1888. This first station was intended to serve an area bounded by Harrison Street, Market Street and Water Street (both now Wacker Drive), and Michigan Avenue, and served this area with an Edison-patented direct current system until it closed in 1914 or 1915.

=== The Samuel Insull Era ===
By 1892, Chicago Edison's load had grown to 3,200 kilowatts, the full capacity of its generating station. Its growth showed no sign of slowing, especially with plans in the works to host the 1893 Columbian Exposition. Its president, E. T. Watkins, had resigned the year before, and it was clear that new leadership was needed. In New York City, meanwhile, Thomas Edison had been bought out of his company as it was being consolidated into the General Electric Company. One of Edison's associates, Samuel Insull, had however been retained as the second vice-president of General Electric, and was subsequently offered the presidency of the company. Instead, Insull agreed to stay on only long enough to oversee the consolidation of Edison's companies.

The board of Chicago Edison wrote to Insull, asking for a recommendation for their president. In reply, Insull applied for the job, saying, "It is the best opportunity that I know of in the United States to develop the business of the production and distribution of electrical energy." The board accepted his application, and on May 26, 1892, Insull was elected president of Chicago Edison.

Upon his arrival, Insull found that Chicago Edison was one of nearly 30 electric companies operating in Chicago, all competing for business. While prevailing opinion at the time held that competition between the many companies was the best way to improve service and keep prices low, Insull believed that a regulated monopoly, giving exclusive operating rights in a specific territory to one company in exchange for state control over service terms and prices, would be most beneficial for both utilities and customers. While state regulation did not begin until 1914, Insull began forming a monopoly on electric service by acquiring many of his competitors. By 1895, he had acquired enough of them, and their rights to use the different manufacturers' equipment, that he had obtained a complete monopoly on electric service in Chicago Edison's territory.

Insull also initiated construction of a much larger power plant on Harrison Street, west of the Chicago River. While its original capacity of 6,400 kilowatts, twice that of the Adams Street Station and the largest in the United States, seemed wildly optimistic when it opened in August, 1894, Insull believed that the economy of scale provided by such a large station would offset the initial cost. Aside from this point, the size of the station allowed it to replace the Adams Street Station, which had become both overloaded and obsolete. Insull's optimism was rapidly justified: the Harrison Street Station reached its original capacity within the first several years, and was expanded to 16,200 kilowatts by 1903, the year Fisk Generating Station put large steam turbines into service.

In 1907, Chicago Edison combined with Commonwealth Electric to form Commonwealth Edison Company. Six years later, it absorbed the independent Cosmopolitan Electric Company, and with that purchase effectively became the sole electric provider in Chicago.

Insull also founded Public Service Company of Northern Illinois, which developed rural electrification in northern Illinois outside Chicago. Public Service and ComEd, along with many other companies, were subsidiaries of Insull's Middle West Utilities Company until Middle West's collapse during the Great Depression. According to at least one source Insull was also the earliest to develop transmission companies, in the 1920s, a concept that was undermined by the development of Public Utility Commissions, in general, and the Public Utilities Company Holding Act of 1935, in particular. Necessary regulation in that form has been overcome by recent deregulatory measures.

In 1994, ComEd reorganized as a holding company, Unicom Corporation, with ComEd as its leading subsidiary. In 2000, UniCom merged with Philadelphia-based electric company PECO Energy to form Exelon.

=== Central Illinois Electric and Gas Company ===
In 1967, Commonwealth Edison acquired Rockford-based Central Illinois Electric and Gas Company. CIE&G served the greater Rockford area and also had service territories in the Lincoln, Illinois area.

=== ComEd Transmission ===
ComEd currently operates transmission lines at the following voltages: 765kV, 345kV, 138kV, 69kV. 34.5kV is the common sub-transmission voltage in the ComEd service territory. ComEd has major interconnections with MidAmerican Energy, AEP, ATC, Ameren and NIPSCO.

=== ComEd Metering ===
ComEd currently uses electric meters manufactured by Aclara.

The company's meter seal colors are the following:

Brown, Light Brown (Rust), Pink (Rose), Beige, Yellow and Green for a variety of purposes. Brown is the main color and is used by Metering personnel.

=== Deregulation and divestiture ===
By 1996, prevailing opinion on the utilities in the United States had changed. Rather than granting one company the exclusive right to generate, transmit and distribute electricity in a specific geographic area, and fixing the rates for that service as one package, it was commonly held that consumers would benefit from opening as much service as possible to competition on an open market. At the federal level, the Federal Energy Regulatory Commission had issued Order 888, opening access to the national transmission grids. Subsequent orders established an open energy marketplace and set rules for participation in it. However, it was left to the individual states to determine the best way to give their electricity customers access to the grid and the benefits of an open market.

For Illinois, the General Assembly passed the Electric Service Customer Choice and Rate Relief Law of 1997. The law ordered most Illinois electric utilities (including Commonwealth Edison) to provide their customers with the option of buying electricity from other suppliers. It also reduced base residential electric prices by 15%, with a further 5% decrease effective in 2001, and froze the reduced rates for ten years. Finally, it obligated the utilities, at the end of that ten-year period, to obtain their electricity through a competitive process.

These rules made it politically desirable for Commonwealth Edison to divest itself of its generation interests, in an attempt to distance itself from any allegations of bias in the competitive process. It sold its coal-fired generating stations to Midwest Generation in 2000, and sold its nuclear generating stations to Exelon Nuclear, another subsidiary of its holding company, in 2003. In theory, this separated the business of generating and selling power from the business of transmitting and distributing it, though in practice the holding company still manages and profits from both businesses. The distinction was blurred even further by the long-term price agreements that went with the sale of the generating stations, under which ComEd was entitled to purchase power below market rates through the end of the rate freeze.

=== The 2007 Rate Case ===
In 2006, as the end of the rate freeze drew near, Commonwealth Edison had to accommodate both a fully competitive market and the end of its own price agreements with the purchasers of its former generating stations. The most visible effect of the proposed rates was to increase residential electric rates sharply. This set the stage for a contentious and vigorous public debate about the rationale for electric deregulation.

ComEd's proposal had two parts. First, delivery rates, which cover the cost of transporting electricity from the generators to the customer, would rise by 22% on the average. Second, the price of the electricity itself would be determined from a reverse auction, with the winning suppliers bound to supply energy to ComEd's customers at some fixed price for a fixed period of time. The net effect was an increase of around 33% in the typical residential electric bill.

The prospect of seeing electric bills rise so dramatically drew much public outcry. It was widely claimed, at the time, that such a dramatic rise in rates was proof that the deregulated environment did nothing to help the consumer and was a sham. The Illinois General Assembly proposed extending the existing rate freeze for several more years in order to give time to develop a better plan. ComEd responded that extending the rate freeze would bankrupt it and that it did not have the ability to obtain electricity at a cost that would support the frozen rates.

In January 2007, the Chicago Tribune reported that Commonwealth Edison was behind Consumers Organized for Reliable Electricity (CORE), an organization that had been arguing against a proposed statewide freeze in electricity rates. The campaign uses a commonly used corporate tactic referred to as astroturfing, in which corporations fund organizations that appears to be grassroots or consumer rights focused to lobby on the corporation's behalf with politicians and the public. Illinois then Lieutenant Governor Pat Quinn attempted to force CORE to put ComEd's name on the ads in a petition filed with the Illinois Commerce Commission. The Commission ultimately dismissed the petition, but not before CORE agreed to disclose ComEd's support of it more clearly.

Ultimately, the General Assembly did not freeze rates, and ComEd's new rate plan went into effect on January 2, 2007. However, subsequent concerns about the impartiality of the reverse auction process resulted in the establishment of the Illinois Power Agency, which conducts the procurement of electricity on behalf of Illinois utilities companies.

As part of the compromise plan to avoid a rate freeze, ComEd devised a means by which a customer might defer payment of the 22% increase, subject to interest of over 3% on the unpaid portion of the increase.

In September 2011, ComEd named the first woman to the CEO post, Anne Pramaggiore. When she was promoted within Exelon, ComEd's parent company, Joe Dominguez was named CEO and COO Terence Donnelly was named president while retaining the title COO.

=== Corruption scandal ===
On July 17, 2020, ComEd agreed to pay $200 million following what had been a several-year federal investigation of suspected illegal lobbying, political graft and sweetheart contract deals which were made in exchange for the company having a near-monopoly on regional power utility. On September 4, 2020, former ComEd Vice-president Fidel Marquez became the first ComEd executive to be criminally charged for his involvement in the scandal. However, Marquez was later to have cooperated as an FBI witness in exchange for a lighter sentence.

==== 2023 ComEd Four convictions ====
On May 2, 2023, ex-ComEd CEO Anne Pramaggiore, former ComEd lobbyist Mike McClain, retired ComEd executive John Hooker, and ex-City Club of Chicago president and former ComEd consultant Jay Doherty were each found guilty on nine counts of bribery conspiracy, bribery and willfully falsifying the company's books. These ComEd associates, who were nicknamed the "ComEd Four" were determined to have made efforts to corruptly influence former Illinois House Speaker Michael Madigan. They would eventually be indicted on November 18, 2020. McClain, who also a co-defendant of Madigan's in a separate corruption case, had a particular notable friendship with Madigan, stemming back to their days as Illinois state representatives in the 1970s.

==== 2025 sentencing and imprisonments ====
On July 14, 2025, Hooker would be sentenced to 1½ years in prison and a $500,000 fine. He would report to a federal prison on October 14, 2025. On July 21, 2025, Pramaggiore was sentenced to two years in prison and a $750,000 fine. Following a delay in her imprisonment, which was initially set to begin on December 1, 2025, Pramaggiore would report to a minimum security federal correctional institution camp in Marianna, Florida on January 12, 2026. On July 24, 2025, McClain became the third member of the ComEd Four to be sentenced after being sentenced to two years in prison for the charges he was convicted on in the ComEd Four case. McClain began serving his sentence at a federal prison in Lexington, Kentucky on December 30, 2025. On August 5, 2025, Doherty would be sentenced to one year in prison. Doherty would begin serving his sentence at a federal prison in Terre Haute, Indiana on September 30, 2025. Marquez, who was later revealed to have cooperated with the investigation against his co-defendants as a both a prosecution witness and by wearing wires to allow the FBI to record conversations he had with the other co-defendants, managed to avoid prison time and would be sentenced to only two years probation on February 19, 2026.

Doherty and Hooker, both of whom opted not to appeal their convictions, would already be released from prison by April 2026.

==== Release and retrial order for Pramaggiore and McClain ====
On April 14, 2026, a Chicago appeals court ordered for both Anne Pramaggiore and Michael McClain to be released from prison on bail, and also undergo new trials. On April 15, 2026, both Pramaggiore and McClain would both officially be released from prison. Both Prammaggiore and McClain are the only two of the four "ComEd Four" defendants still appealing their convictions, with their co-defendants Jay Doherty and John Hooker having already been released from prison without undergoing conviction appeals. As conditions for their bails, Pramaggiore and McClain are also required to report to pretrial services in the Northern District of Illinois.

== Smart Grid ==
In 2016, ComEd made an investment worth $2.6 billion in what is known as their "Smart Grid." The plan will modernize the electric grid in Illinois by improving electric lines, installing smart meters and otherwise upgrading what the company says was badly outdated infrastructure. The intent of the Smart Grid plan is to make the Illinois electric grid stronger and more modern, and to eliminate the need for meter readers. Smart grid technology is similar to smartphone technology in that it uses wireless connectivity to update information about power consumption and other events. ComEd lobbyists wrote the law as mandatory Wireless Smart Meter installations to all customers of Illinois. It was passed by the Illinois General Assembly against vehement and persistent opposition from the Attorney General, AARP and informed Illinois citizens. ComEd spent around $16 million convincing General Assembly to over-ride Governor Quinn's Veto. When elected, Governor Rauner signed another bill favoring ComEd over the rights of citizens to have a choice to opt out from installation of Wireless Smart Meter. ComEd and the other primary utility company in Illinois have together installed more than 3 million smart meters—digital devices that collect information about how much electricity is used—at customer homes and businesses. The meters send that information to ComEd through wireless technology. ComEd has said that the technology "has avoided 7.6 million outages and generated $1.4 billion in societal savings."

The Smart Meter replacement project was awarded to Aclara Smart Grid Solutions, with the rollout starting in late 2016 in Chicago. The project was completed in 2019 in the western edge of the ComEd service territory.

On February 28, 2018, Illinois utility regulators authorized ComEd to establish a 10-year electric microgrid demonstration project on the South Side of Chicago. "The Bronzeville Community Microgrid Project will connect with a microgrid at the Illinois Institute of Technology, creating one of the first utility-scale microgrid clusters in the nation, ComEd officials said," according to Daily Energy Insider.

== See also ==
- Commonwealth Edison Co. v. Montana
