= Trial of Mike Madigan =

2024 federal criminal trial in Illinois

United States v. Madigan
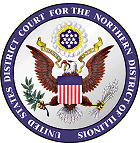
- Court: United States District Court for the Northern District of Illinois
- Full case name: United States of America v. Michael J. Madigan, Michael F. McClain
- Defendant: Mike Madigan

Court membership
- Judge sitting: John R. Blakey

United States v. Madigan (officially the United States of America v. Michael J. Madigan, Michael F. McClain) is the 2024 federal trial involving Mike Madigan, the former Speaker of the Illinois House of Representatives. Madigan was indicted on charges of bribery, racketeering, extortion and fraud. Mike McClain is a co-defendant in the case, who was convicted in the previous year's ComEd case.

The case is regarded as one of the biggest public corruption cases in the history of Illinois, and as a landmark case. The trial has been described as one of the most anticipated public corruption trials in the history of Illinois.

== Background ==
Mike Madigan was indicted on 23 charges, while his close confidant and co-defendant Mike McClain is indicted on six charges. A 117-page grand jury indictment holds that Madigan led what is called the "Madigan Enterprise", which was designed to empower him and enrich his allies as well. Madigan lost a motion to dismiss his bribery charges, as he cited the U.S. Supreme Court decision in the 2024 case Snyder v. United States.

The indictment came after over a decade of FBI and prosecutors investigating and digging for evidence.

Madigan was the Speaker of the Illinois House of Representatives for nearly four decades, and was considered the political boss of the state.

Assistant U.S. attorneys Sarah Streicker and Julia Schwartz are prosecuting the case. The Madigan legal team is led by Daniel Collins, Tom Breen and Todd Pugh, and McClain’s legal team is led by Patrick Cotter, John Mitchell and David Niemeier.

== Trial ==
Jury selection began on October 8, 2024. Because of Madigan's influence and longevity, the process of selecting a jury was slow, and six days into the process, a full jury had not yet been selected. On October 17, all 12 jurors had been selected, though alternate jurors were still needed.

Opening statements began on October 21, after alternate jurors had finally been selected. Prosecutors rested their case on December 18.

== Verdict ==
On February 12, 2025, Madigan was convicted on ten counts of bribery, wire fraud, and Travel Act violations. He would be convicted on one count of conspiracy, two counts of bribery, one count of a violation of the Travel Act in conjunction with an alleged scheme involving the Illinois electricity utility Commonwealth Edison ("ComEd"), three counts of wire fraud in connection to a scheme to offer paid state positions to former Chicago Alderman Danny Solis and his daughter, one count of violating of the Travel Act in conjunction with an alleged scheme involving the Illinois electricity utility Commonwealth Edison ("ComEd"), three counts which accusing him of violating the Travel Act by having Solis set up meetings in efforts to try to win business for the Madigan's private law firm. Solis was acknowledged to have recorded their conversations. The jury would be deadlocked on all six racketeering charges against Madigan, such as an overarching racketeering conspiracy charge which had been related to Madigan's alleged illegal dealings with businessman Michael McClain, and he would be found not guilty on one count of bribery related to the ComEd scheme, count of violating the Travel Act in ComEd scheme, a bribery charge which alleged he had tried to secure a state board position for Solis through the administration of Illinois Gov. J.B. Pritzker, and on a series of charges related to the Union West luxury apartment development, including multiple violations of the Travel Act and one count of attempted extortion.

The same day, however, it was declared that the jury could not reach a verdict for any of the six charges regarding Madigan's co-defendant Michael McClain, with Judge Blakely declaring a mistrial for each charge against McClain. On August 12, 2025, the charges against McClain related to the Madigan trial would be dismissed.

As of April 2026, an appeals court issued a 29 page ruling which upheld the verdict and the former Illinois House Speaker will remain in prison for the corruption conviction.
