= Harriette Walters =

Former civil servant

Harriette Monica Walters (born September 1956) is a former civil servant who worked as a tax assessment manager for the District of Columbia. In 2009, Walters was sentenced to 17-and-a-half years in prison due to a massive tax fraud.

== Fraud scheme ==
Walters was arrested in November 2007 for orchestrating a massive embezzlement scheme that stole $48 million over two decades from the District tax coffers. Walters and her co-conspirators created fake property tax refund checks, which they cashed and used to fund lavish lifestyles. The fraud went undetected for years due to lax oversight and Walters' ability to manipulate the system. Referred to as "Mother Walters", she often bribed co-workers with gifts and trips to maintain their silence.

The District of Columbia's tax code allows for property tax refunds in cases of overpayment. From 2004 onwards, Harriette Walters, Diane Gustus, and other D.C. government employees allegedly engaged in the fraudulent scheme. They prepared or approved false property tax refund requests, resulting in over 40 fraudulent refund checks, each averaging more than $388,000. These checks were deposited into fake corporate accounts controlled by Walters' relatives, including accounts named "Chappa Home Services," "Legna Home Services," and "Helmet Plumbing and Heating." The ill-gotten funds were then distributed among the co-conspirators and family members through various means, including cash, cashier's checks, and wire transfers. The money was used to purchase a wide range of luxury items, including homes, vehicles, jewelry, clothing, and other personal property. The scheme was eventually uncovered when a bank teller became suspicious of a large check.

== Sentencing and restitution ==
In 2009, Walters was sentenced to 17-and-a-half years in prison. Additionally, she was ordered to repay the full amount of $48 million that she embezzled, $12 million in federal taxes and $3.2 million to the District of Columbia government.

From the Washington Examiner (June 30, 2009): "Self-confessed tax scam mastermind Harriette Walters was led off to prison, but not before warning a federal judge that the District's finance office remains dangerously exposed to another massive rip-off. "If you let me into my office, I guarantee I could get each of you a check", Walters told prosecutors and federal Judge Emmet Sullivan, before he sentenced her to 17-and-a-half years in prison."

== Academic study ==
The fraud scheme of Harriette Walters has been the subject of academic and professional publications. Jacoby, Loringo, and McCallum have described the mechanics of the fraud scheme with informative analytics looking at the amounts over time. The authors have reviewed the importance of internal controls and control activity deficiencies, as lacking in these aspects allowed the proceeds of the fraud scheme to exceed $48 million.

== Release ==
On January 13, 2022, Walters was released from prison after serving more than 14 years.
