= Frank Kruesi =

Frank Kruesi is the former President of the Chicago Transit Authority. He resigned in April 2007 after serving for 9½ years. He is now an Adjunct Faculty member at the University of Chicago's Harris School of Public Policy. Prior to his time at CTA, he was the Assistant Secretary for Transportation Policy for the U.S. Department of Transportation.

== Frank Kruesi ==
- Appearances on C-SPAN

Preceded by David Mosena	President of the Chicago Transit Authority; 1997–2007	Succeeded by Ron Huberman
