= Anne Pramaggiore =

American business executive

Personal details
- Education: Miami University (BFA); DePaul University (JD)

Anne Rita Pramaggiore is an American business executive. She served as senior executive vice president and CEO of Exelon Utilities, which oversees energy company Exelon Corporation's six gas and electric utility companies. Notably, she also served as the first female president and CEO of ComEd, one of Exelon's subsidiaries. In this role, Pramaggiore oversaw the modernization of the Chicago electric grid, and became the national leader on grid modernization and SmartGrid technology Since the completion of the SmartGrid modernization in the Chicagoland area, the frequency of outages for ComEd customers has improved by 50%, and saved customers $4.3 billion in outage-related costs.

Pramaggiore was also a notable Chicago civic leader for over a decade, serving on the boards of the Art Institute of Chicago, DePaul University, The Lincoln Park Zoo, the Chicago Urban League, and as chairwoman of the board of directors for the Federal Reserve Bank of Chicago.

In 2014, Crain's Chicago Business named Pramaggiore the 5th most powerful woman in Chicago as CEO of Commonwealth Edison.

In October 2019, she announced her retirement amid a federal probe into ComEd's efforts to bribe the former Speaker of the Illinois House. Pramaggiore was indicted in November 2020 on nine counts of conspiracy, bribery and willfully falsifying ComEd's books and records. She was convicted on all charges in May 2023. In March 2025, a federal judge vacated and dismissed four of these counts, including the entirety of the bribery conviction. However, she was sentenced in July 2025 to two years imprisonment for the remaining charges of which she was convicted. On January 12, 2026, Pramaggiore reported to federal correctional institution in Florida. In April 2026, however, Pramggiore was released on bail, with a new trial also ordered.

== Early life and education ==
Anne Pramaggiore was born on August 9, 1958, to Alfred Pramaggiore and Jeanne Lacy Pramaggiore, and grew up in Dayton, Ohio. Alfred Pramaggiore was born in Brooklyn, New York, to parents who emigrated from Italy. After graduating from City College of New York, Alfred pursued a career as a civil engineer. Jeanne Lacy Pramaggiore was a girl scout leader who later worked on political campaigns. She also served as a president of the Ohio Genealogical Society.

Pramaggiore graduated from Miami University in Oxford, Ohio in 1980 with a bachelor's degree in theater. She later attended DePaul University College of Law and served as the editor-in-chief of the school's Law Review. She earned her Juris Doctor degree in 1989.

== Career ==
While still living in Ohio, Pramaggiore completed the management training program at Elder Beerman Department Store. She went on to become an assistant department manager at the store and then became a buyer for Snyder's Department Store in Louisville, Kentucky.

After attending law school, Pramaggiore took a position as a clerk in the U.S. District Court for the Northern District of Illinois under Judge Charles P. Kocoras. She considered Judge Kocoras a 'significant mentor.' She clerked from 1989 to 1990. She next became an associate and eventually a partner at the law firm of McDermott Will & Emery, remaining there until 1998.

=== Commonwealth Edison ===
Pramaggiore joined Commonwealth Edison (ComEd) as an attorney focused on deregulation and was named senior vice president at the utility in 2006. She was promoted to president and CEO of the utility in February 2012. She was the first female to hold the post of president and CEO at the electric utility. Known as ComEd, the company delivers electricity to more than four million customers in Chicago and Northern Illinois.

At ComEd, Pramaggiore set the legislative framework for the company's smart grid build out, which has become a national model. The legislation allowed ComEd to build the nation’s first neighborhood “microgrid,” that can monitor energy flow and quickly alert the company about outages.Under her leadership, ComEd "worked closely with the community solar industry" to implement a 2016 law called the Future Energy Jobs Act which created incentives for using more energy from solar and other renewable sources.

=== Exelon Utilities ===
In May 2018, Pramaggiore was named senior executive vice president and CEO of Exelon Utilities, where she oversaw ComEd and five other gas and electric utility companies.

== Federal criminal charges ==
In October 2019, Pramaggiore resigned her position as Exelon CEO amidst a federal investigation into ComEd's lobbying activities. On November 18, 2020, Pramaggiore and three others were indicted on charges of bribery conspiracy, bribery and falsifying business records. The four were accused of illegally influencing and rewarding Michael Madigan, former long-time speaker of the Illinois House of Representatives. Madigan was charged in a separate indictment and awaits trial.

On May 2, 2023, Pramaggiore and her co-defendants were found guilty on all charges. In July 2023, her license to practice law in Illinois was suspended due to her criminal convictions. In 2025, a federal judge vacated and dismissed four of these counts, including the entirety of the bribery conviction.

=== Sentence ===
On July 21, 2025, Pramaggiore was sentenced to two years in prison and a $750,000 fine. However, Pramaggiore did not report to prison by the initially scheduled date of December 1, 2025, due to medical reasons. Her prison report date was later rescheduled for January 12, 2026. On January 12, 2026, Pramaggiore reported to a minimum security federal prison camp in Marianna, Florida.

=== Release and re-trial order ===
On April 14, 2026, the Chicago-based 7th Circuit Court of Appeals ordered for Pramaggiore and "ComEd Four" co-defendant Michael McClain to be released from prison on bail, and also undergo a new trial. On April 15, 2026, Pramaggiore, as well as McClain, were officially released from prison. As condition for her release, Pramaggiore, like McClain, is required to report to pretrial services in the Northern District of Illinois.
