= Arenda Troutman =

American politician

City of Chicago Alderman
- In office April 1990 – February 2007
- Preceded by: Ernest Jones
- Succeeded by: Willie Cochran
- Constituency: 20th Ward

Personal details
- Born: Arenda Iris Troutman; September 29, 1957 (age 69) Chicago, Illinois, U.S.
- Party: Democratic Party
- Children: 3
- Education: Southern Illinois University Carbondale (B.A.)

Arenda Iris Troutman (born September 29, 1957) is an American former politician who ran as a member of the Democratic Party. Troutman served as alderman of Chicago, Illinois 20th Ward from April 1990 until February 2007. Troutman was appointed to her position by Chicago Mayor Richard M. Daley, to fill the ward's vacancy after the death of alderman Ernest Jones. Troutman was subsequently re-elected in 1991, 1995, 1999, and 2003.

On August 6, 2008, Troutman pleaded guilty to two federal counts, including admitting to taking bribes as an alderman. Troutman was sentenced to four years in prison on February 17, 2009, and ordered to begin serving the sentence June 1, 2009.

== Early and personal life ==
Troutman was born one of nine children to Benjamin Troutman Sr. (1930–1997) and Iris Mae Troutman in Chicago, Illinois. For high school, Troutman attended Calumet High School, graduating in 1976. Troutman later attended Southern Illinois University Carbondale, where she received her B.A. in Political Science. After graduating, Troutman worked as a supervisor in the Illinois Secretary of State office. During her 2007 re-election campaign, It was revealed publicly by her opponents that she had been arrested for shop-lifting during sometime in 1978. Troutman has never married and is the mother of three sons.

== Aldermanic career (1990–2007) ==
Troutman was appointed as alderman by Mayor Richard M. Daley in April 1990 to fill a vacancy after the death of Alderman Ernest Jones. At the time of her appointment, Troutman was the 16th woman to serve as a Chicago alderman. As alderman, Troutman increased the number of financial institutions in her ward, sponsored the Affordable Housing and Job Training ordinances and fought for improvements for all Chicago Public Schools. Troutman was chairman of the Historical Landmark Preservation Committee, and co-chair of Housing and Real Estate. Additionally, Troutman served on the Budget and Government Operations; Buildings; Committees, Rules and Ethics; Education; Police and Fire; Zoning; and Finance Committees. In 2006, Troutman was active in fundraising for presidential candidate Hillary Clinton and, in 2002, was a campaign advisor for vice presidential candidate John Edwards.

Troutman had also come under scrutiny on numerous occasions for ethical lapses in her career as alderman. In 2004, it was revealed Troutman may have been dating Donnell "Scandalous" Jehan, the second-in-command of the Black Disciples street gang, who had fled the FBI after being indicated in a $350,000+/week drug operation in Troutman's ward. Jehan had been seen driving Troutman's car. A letter from Chicago Police Patrol Chief James Maurer to Troutman on police letterhead was found in the FBI raid on Jehan's home. Troutman commented that she thought he was "a businessman" and that she let "everybody" drive her car.

Around the time her relationship with Jehan ended, Troutman reported several break-ins at her home and requested 24-hour police presence. This action was noticed by several firearms advocacy groups including the Second Amendment Foundation and the website Women & Guns. The Chicago Sun Times reported that Troutman had helped to start a hired-truck company for her family to own and profit from. The Hired Truck Program was credited with being the scandal that opened the doors for current federal investigations into city hiring, a part of which led to the recent conviction of patronage chief Robert Sorich. Troutman's family business reportedly earned $1.1 million from the program.

=== 2007 Re-election attempt ===
Despite her arrest and indictment on bribery charges, Troutman was a candidate in the February 27, 2007, election. Troutman was defeated by Willie B. Cochran, a former Chicago Police Department sergeant and laundromat owner.

== Federal bribery conviction ==
On Monday, January 8, 2007, Troutman was arrested and charged with accepting a bribe from a federal informant as part of an undercover investigation. After 30 minutes of the FBI knocking on the door of Troutman's house, with Troutman inside refusing to open the door, FBI agents broke a window to gain entry. Troutman was the first female alderman to be charged while in office. She was released on $10,000 bond pending a preliminary hearing scheduled for Friday, January 13, 2007. An affidavit filed by an FBI agent in the case alleged that Troutman accepted a $5,000 bribe, and expected another $10,000, in exchange for preferential treatment for a real estate developer co-operating with the FBI. Troutman asked an undercover FBI informant:

What do I get out of it?

and was recorded on an FBI tape saying:

Most aldermen, most politicians, are hos.

The property involved was not part of Troutman's own 20th Ward, but on the opposite side of the street from it, in the 16th Ward, limiting the influence that Troutman could have had in any zoning changes. A city zoning administrator told Troutman that the development could be accommodated under the zoning status at that time. The developer had two felony convictions and had been sued on several occasions for mortgage fraud and identity theft. The FBI claimed to have been unaware of their co-operating witness' criminal record until it was informed by a reporter from the Chicago Tribune.

On April 8, 2008, a federal grand jury in Chicago returned a 15-count second superseding indictment against Troutman and co-defendants Steven Boone, a Chicago government employee, and Vincent Gilbert, an acquaintance of Troutman. On August 6, 2008, Troutman pleaded guilty to one count of mail fraud and one count of tax fraud for filing a false return. On February 17, 2009, she was sentenced to four years in prison, stating, "With God as my witness, I am not a monster". She began serving her sentence on June 1, 2009. She was released to a halfway house in June 2013.
