= City Club of Chicago =

American nonprofit organization

- Formation: 1903
- Type: Non-Profit
- Purpose: foster civic responsibility, promote public issues, and provide a forum for open political debate
- Headquarters: 400 N. Michigan Ave, Suite 1018, Chicago, IL 60611
- Region served: Chicago (United States)
- Website: cityclub-chicago.org

The City Club of Chicago is a 501 (c)(3) nonpartisan, nonprofit membership organization intended to foster civic responsibility, promote public issues, and provide Chicago, Cook County, and Illinois with a forum for open political debate. The organization attracts those interested in civic responsibility, public issues, politics and networking opportunities. Affiliates of the club include prominent business, civic, and governmental leaders in Chicago. Founded in 1903, it is the longest-running public policy forum in Chicago.

The City Club has boasted such prominent members as Jane Addams, Ruth Hanna McCormick, Louise DeKoven Bowen, Richard J. Daley, Henry Horner, George Herbert Mead, Charles Edward Merriam, Harold Ickes, and Louis Sullivan.

== History ==
When the City Club began, it operated amidst adverse social and working conditions. Chicago had the dubious honor of being labeled a notorious city in terms of politics. The City Club took a leadership role in initiating political change in Chicago by establishing committees to investigate and report on aspects of local government and public policy. One of the most notable probes conducted by the City Club was its 1904 "Piper Report," which took a critical look at the operations and conduct of the Chicago Police Department.

By 1913, membership included more than 2,400 individuals. Membership increased shortly thereafter, upon merging with the Women's City Club of Chicago, its sister organization. However, following the Second World War and the Post-War Period, membership began to decline. When then-Mayor Richard J. Daley died in 1976, membership numbered as low as 60. That year also marked a turning point for the organization. Under the direction of Larry Horist and Tom Roeser, membership began to steadily rise throughout the late 1970s and early 1980s. At the end of 2017, membership totaled some 2,200 members - close to its 1913 high. While times have changed and issues have morphed since its inception, the City Club is still committed to addressing the problems of the Chicago metropolitan area and engaging in productive dialogue with its constituents.

The City Club of Chicago's crusading spirit inspired the founding of unaffiliated City Clubs in other major cities, including Boston, Philadelphia, Cleveland, Seattle and San Diego.

At least one former City Club of Chicago president, Jay Doherty, was jailed.

== Events ==
All City Club of Chicago events are open to the public and feature some of the most well-known and influential figures of the day. As a non-partisan public affairs forum, the City Club hosts figures of all political ideologies and backgrounds. Such speakers include: Pres. Donald Trump, Pres. Barack Obama, Sen. Richard Durbin, Cook County Board President Toni Preckwinkle, Governor Pat Quinn, Mayor Richard M. Daley, former Sec. of Education Arne Duncan, Lt. Gov. Corrine Wood, DuPage County Board Chairman Daniel Cronin, Vice President Mike Pence, and Speaker of the U.S. House of Representatives Paul Ryan.

While political and civic affairs is a guiding tent of the programming, in recent years, the City Club of Chicago has diversified its array of guests. The organization has started bringing in leaders in the fields of technology, infrastructure, business, science, cuisine, culture, sociology, education, and non-profit organizations. Speakers include Rick Bayless, Mike Ditka, Tom Ricketts, Anne Pramaggiore, Wick Moorman, Dr. John Jay Shannon, Karen Lewis, and Howard Tullman. The City Club hosts thematic panels and forums targeting contemporaneous cultural, social, and political events. From panels explicating federal legislation and analyzing national sociocultural trends to the events on the local Chicago Architectural Biennial, the City Club endeavors to present a wide variety of themes and issues apart from those purely political.

Events consist of a reception, main event, and question and answer section, and can come in the form of a debate, forum, speech, or panel. The City Club produces anywhere between 75 and 100 events per year, including Luncheons and Breakfasts. Events are live-streamed and archived online so that any member of the public can access them.
