= Snyder v. United States =

- Supreme Court of the United States

Argued April 15, 2024 Decided June 26, 2024
- Full case name: James E. Snyder v. United States
- Docket no.: 23-108
- Citations: 603 U.S. 1 (more)
- Argument: Oral argument
- Decision: Opinion

Case history
- Prior: Conviction affirmed, United States v. Snyder, 71 F.4th 555 (2023)

Questions presented
- Whether section 666 criminalizes gratuities, i.e., payments in recognition of actions the official has already taken or committed to take, without any quid pro quo agreement to take those actions.

Holding
- Section 666 proscribes bribes to state and local officials but does not make it a crime for those officials to accept gratuities for their past acts.

Court membership
- Chief Justice John Roberts Associate Justices Clarence Thomas · Samuel Alito; Sonia Sotomayor · Elena Kagan; Neil Gorsuch · Brett Kavanaugh; Amy Coney Barrett · Ketanji Brown Jackson

Case opinions
- Majority: Kavanaugh, joined by Roberts, Thomas, Alito, Gorsuch, Barrett
- Concurrence: Gorsuch
- Dissent: Jackson, joined by Sotomayor, Kagan

Laws applied
- 18 U.S.C. § 666

Snyder v. United States, 603 U.S. 1 (2024), was a United States Supreme Court case in which the Court held 18 U.S.C. § 666 prohibits bribes to state and local officials but does not make it a crime for those officials to accept gratuities for their past acts.

Legal scholars and commentators have expressed concerns that the Snyder decision may lead to increased corruption and influence peddling, as it creates a significant loophole by not criminalizing gratuities.

== Background ==
=== Factual background ===
The case involves James Snyder, the former mayor of Portage, Indiana, who was convicted of accepting a $13,000 payment from Great Lakes Peterbilt after the city awarded the company contracts worth approximately $1.1 million. Snyder claimed the payment was for consulting services, while prosecutors argued it was an illegal gratuity connected to the contracts.

=== Legal background ===
Section 666 is one of several federal crimes relating to public corruption within Title 18 of the United States Code. The statute applies to an organization or governmental entity that receives at least $10,000 per year in federal funds for things like grants or contracts. It creates a criminal offense for when an official or employee of a covered entity –

corruptly solicits or demands [...] or accepts or agrees to accept, anything of value [...] intending to be influenced or rewarded in connection with any business, transaction, or series of transactions of such organization, government, or agency involving any thing of value of $5,000 or more

and imposes a criminal penalty of up to 10 years in prison.

The central legal question in Snyder v. United States was whether 18 U.S.C. § 666 criminalizes the acceptance of gratuities by state and local officials for their past official acts, or if it only applies to bribes given with an intent to influence future actions. The distinction between bribes and gratuities is a key focus:

- Bribes are payments made with the intent to influence an official act. Under federal law, a bribe involves a quid pro quo arrangement where the payment is directly linked to a specific action or decision by the public official.
- Gratuities, on the other hand, are payments given as a reward for a past action. Unlike bribes, gratuities do not require a prior agreement or an explicit exchange.

During oral argument, Justice Jackson questioned whether this "distinction creates a loophole where public officials can take official actions and later solicit or accept payments without it constituting a crime under § 666, potentially undermining efforts to combat public corruption and allowing sophisticated influence-peddling schemes to evade federal prosecution."

== Opinion of the court ==
The Court, in a 6–3 decision, ruled that section 666 does not criminalize gratuities, only bribes. The opinion, delivered by Justice Kavanaugh, emphasized several key points:

1. Text and history: The Court noted that the text of section 666 is modeled on the federal bribery statute (section 201(b)) rather than the gratuities statute (section 201(c)), suggesting it is intended to cover only bribery.

2. Statutory structure: The absence of a separate provision for gratuities in section 666, as exists for federal officials under section 201, reinforced the interpretation that section 666 is a bribery statute.

3. Punishments: The Court found it implausible that Congress would subject state and local officials to harsher penalties for gratuities than those faced by federal officials, which would be the case if section 666 covered gratuities.

4. Federalism: The decision highlighted concerns about infringing on state and local governments' prerogative to regulate their officials' acceptance of gifts and gratuities.

5. Fair notice: The ruling emphasized that the Government's interpretation would create uncertainty and potential traps for state and local officials who might be unaware of what constitutes a criminal gratuity under federal law.

=== Dissent ===
Justice Jackson, in her dissent, argued that section 666's language clearly encompasses gratuities, emphasizing that both bribes and gratuities threaten the integrity of public institutions. She criticized the majority for undermining Congress's intent to broadly combat corruption involving federal funds, and called their reading of the statute "absurd and atextual".

"Ignoring the plain text of §666—which, again, expressly targets officials who “corruptly” solicit, accept, or agree to accept payments “intending to be influenced or rewarded”—the Court concludes that the statute does not criminalize gratuities at all." –Justice Jackson

== Analysis and reactions ==
The Snyder decision means that state and local officials cannot be federally prosecuted under section 666 for accepting gratuities. This leaves the regulation of such conduct to state and local governments.

Legal scholars and commentators have expressed concerns that the Snyder decision may lead to increased corruption and influence peddling, as it creates a significant loophole by not criminalizing gratuities. According to Jacobin, the ruling aligns with precedents like Citizens United v. FEC and SpeechNow.org v. FEC, which deregulated political contributions, potentially facilitating sophisticated influence schemes without explicit quid pro quo arrangements.

== See also ==
- Federal prosecution of public corruption in the United States
