= List of events at Soldier Field =

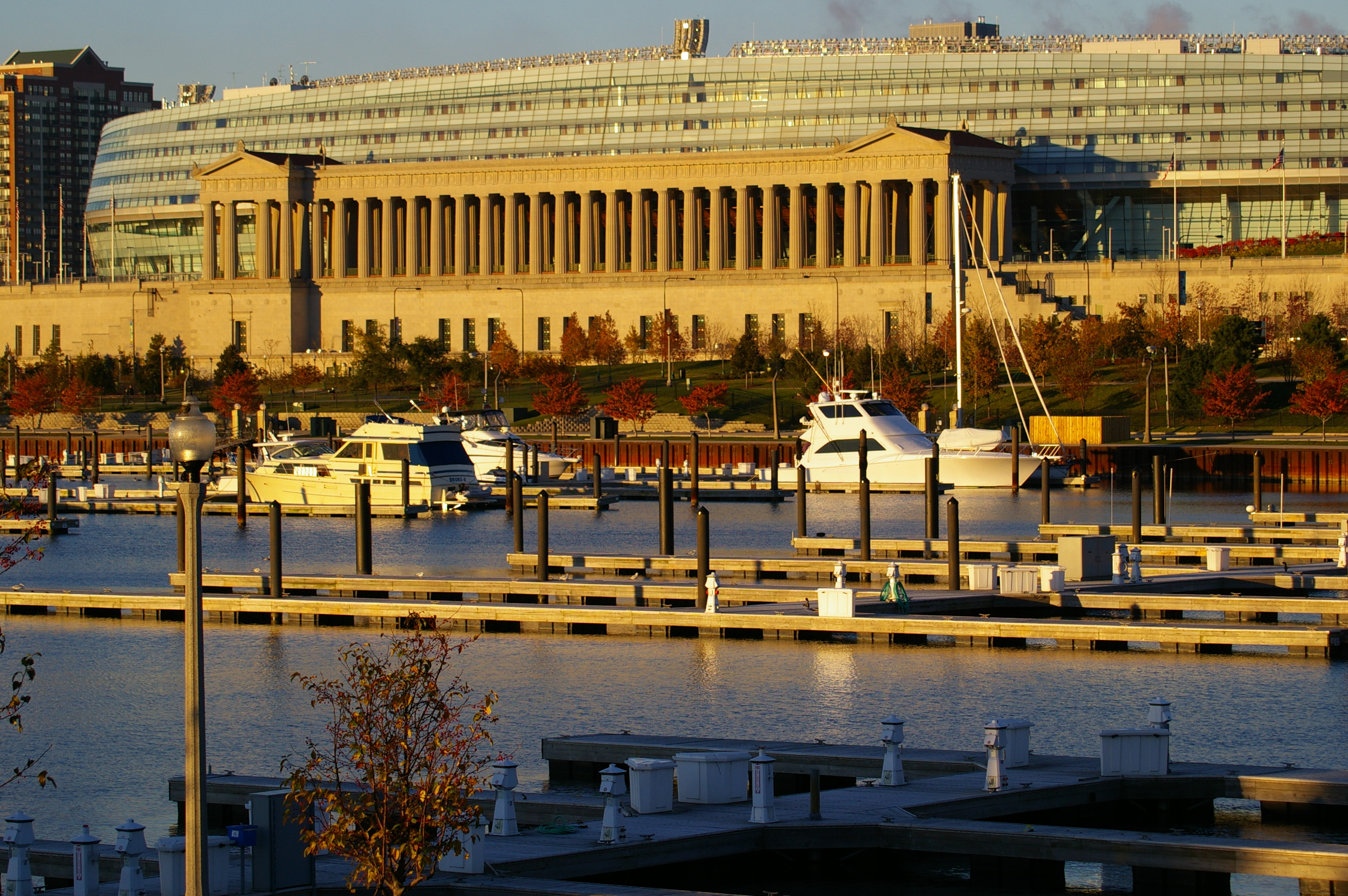
Soldier Field in 2006

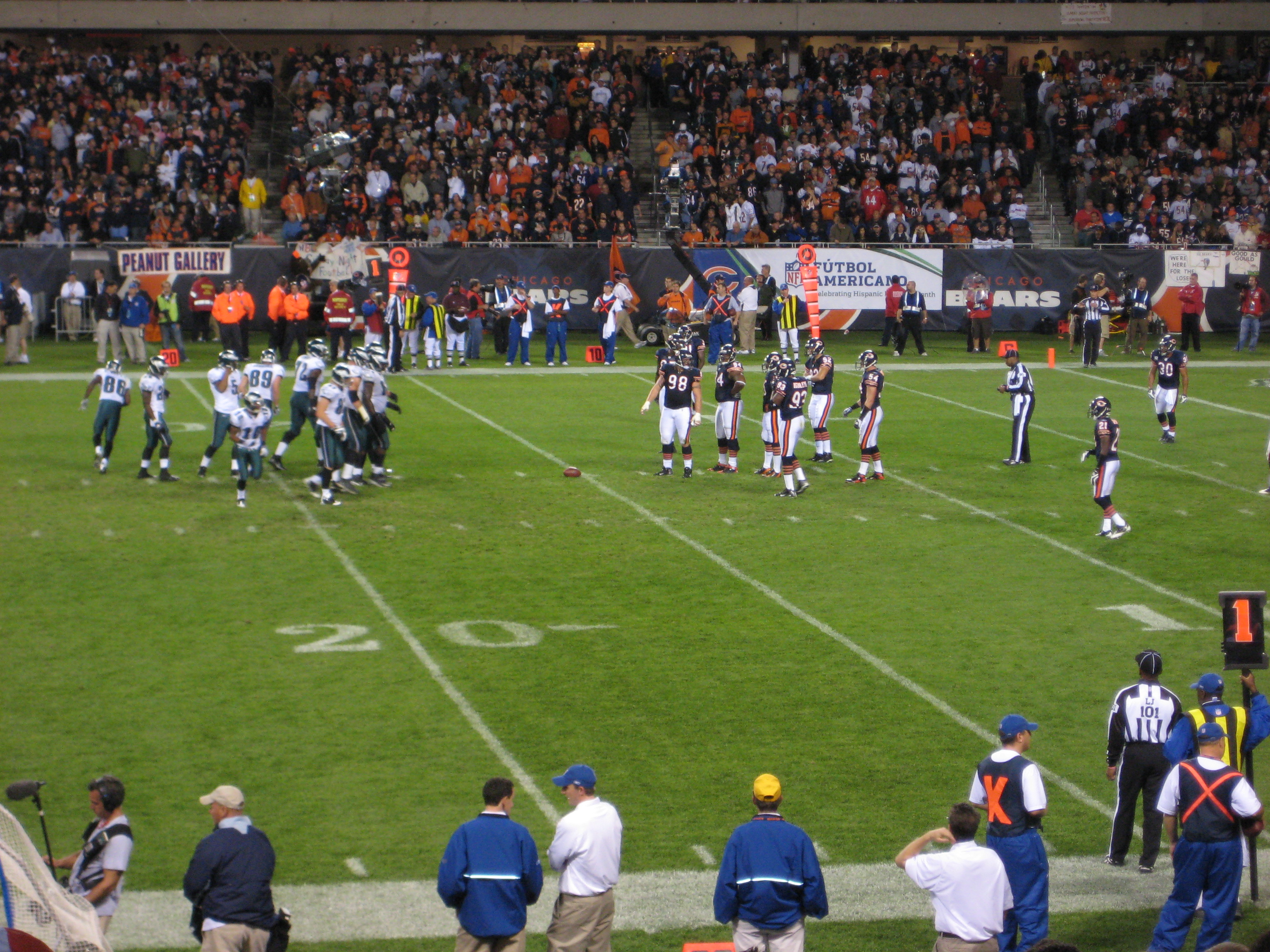
The Chicago Bears have played as main tenants of Soldier Field for over 40 years. Here they are playing the Philadelphia Eagles at Soldier Field September 28, 2008.

Soldier Field is a stadium that opened in 1924. It has primarily served as the home field of the Chicago Bears professional football club for over four decades, but it also hosted numerous other events in its more than 100 years of existence.

== Annual events ==
=== Current ===
- Special Olympics Chicago (1968–2001 and 2003–present)

=== Former ===
- American Legion Fourth of July Show
- Chicagoland Music Festival
- Chicago College All-Star Game football game (held at Soldier Field 1934–1942 and 1945–1976)
- Chicago Prep Bowl football game (held at Soldier Field 1927, 1933–2001; 2003–2015)
- German Day (1925–1937)
- Ringling Bros. and Barnum & Bailey Circus performances in the stadium's parking lot (1931–1932, 1935–1946, 1947–1955)
- Spring Awakening Music Festival (2012–2015)
- Tuskegree and Wilberforce University football rivalry game (played at Soldier Field 1929–1930, 1933–1936, and 1938–1941)
- War shows
- Motorsports competitions

== 1920s ==
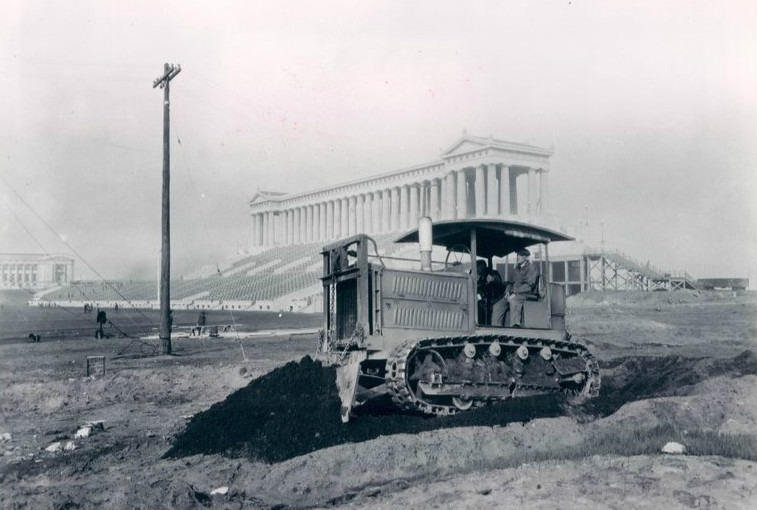
Soldier Field nearing completion in 1924

=== 1924 ===
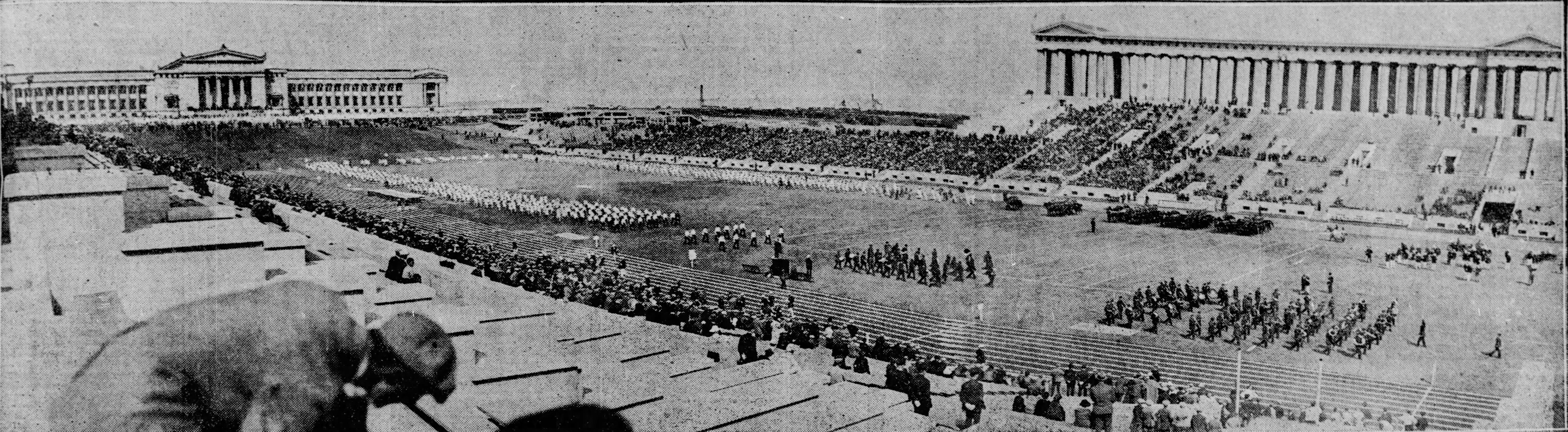
Soldier Field opens on September 6, 1924 with a police athletics meet

- September 5: The first event at the stadium, a 16-pound hammer throw for the Police Athletic Games" is held a day before the official opening "to avoid any possibility of an accident." Traffic officer John Walsh wins the lone competition with a throw of 132 feet, 10 inches.
- September 6: opening day on Saturday for the first dedicatory event at the "Grant Park Stadium" an athletics meet with policemen as participants. This event was a fundraiser for the Chicago Police Benevolent Association, which provided support for police widows and officers disabled in the line of action. The meet's official opening ceremony on the second day featured 1,200 police officers parading through the stadium, fireworks, and music by two police bands, among other entertainment. The contests in the event included a chariot race and a game of motorcycle polo. The opening ceremony was attended by 45,000 spectators. Events raising funds for Chicago's Policemen and Firemen Benevolent funds were a mainstay at Soldier Field until 1971.
- September 10: "Pageant of Music and Light", an additional dedicatory event for the stadium.
- On September 27: Chicago Daily News-sponsored women's track meet with more than 500 Chicago-area participants. In addition to traditional track and field events, the competition also included such events as a basketball distance throw.
- October 4: high school American football game between Louisville Male High School and Chicago's Austin Community Academy High School, the first football game in the stadium's history.

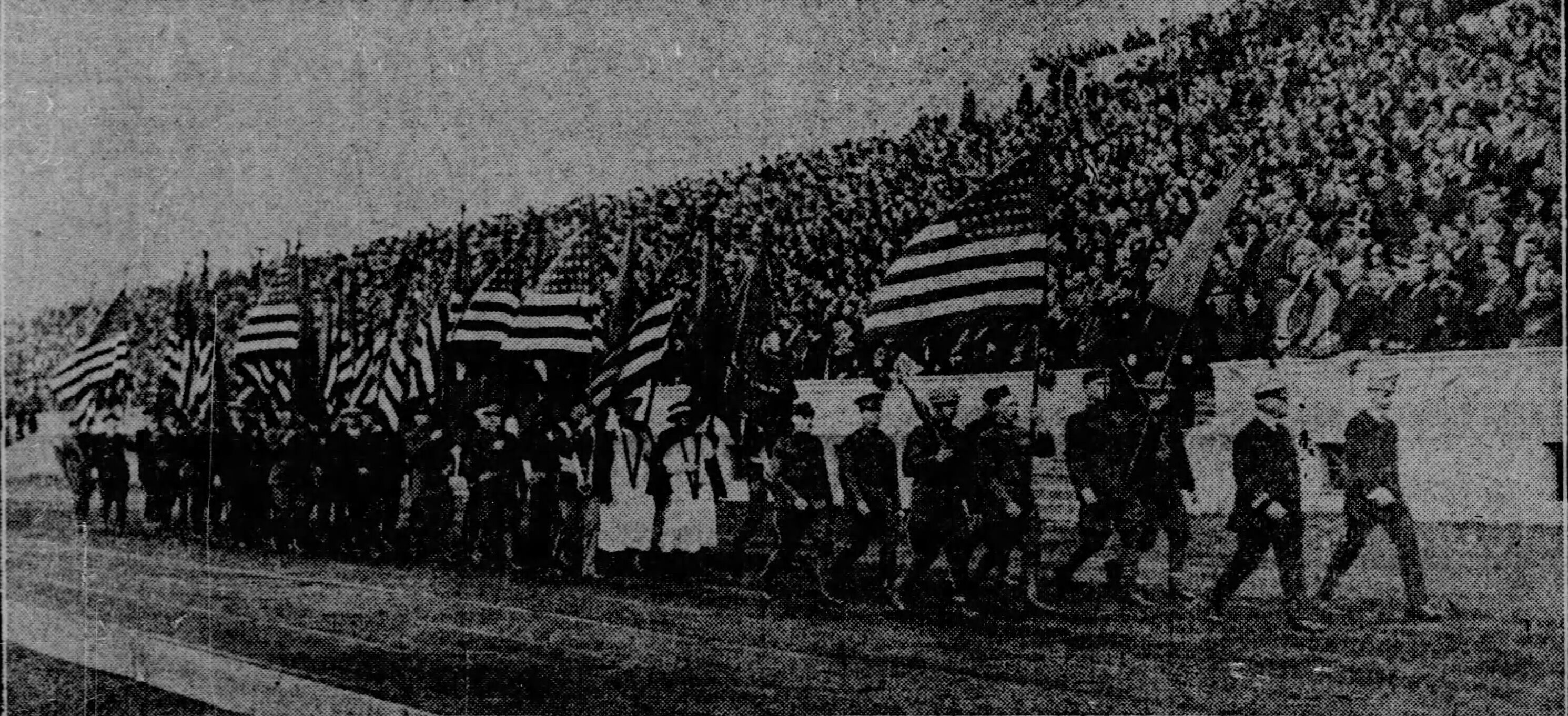
October 9, 1924 "Chicago Day" event, which featured the formal dedication and opening of the stadium

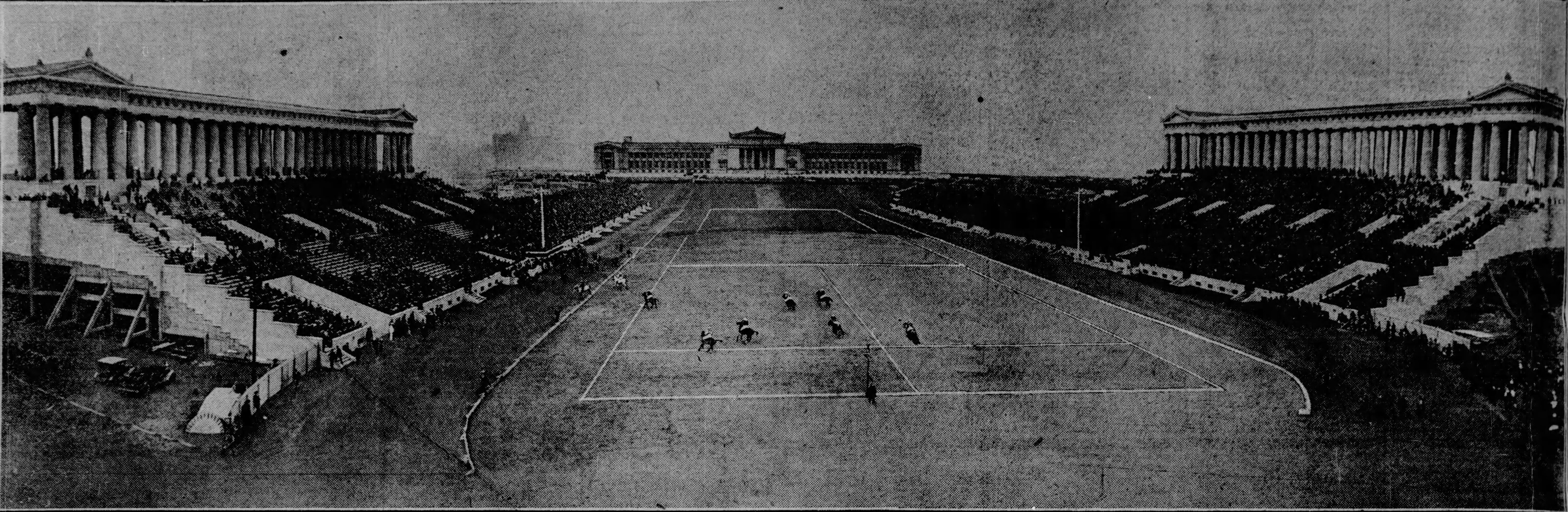
October 9, 1924 "Chicago Day" event

- October 9: "Chicago Day" event, marking the anniversary of the Great Chicago Fire, attended by a crowd of 60,000. The event contained the formal dedication and official opening of the stadium. The event included military troops partaking in a mock battle, equine performances by riders from the 14th Cavalry's Troop A, and a semi re-enactment of the Great Chicago Fire with firemen (including ten who actually had fought the Great Fire) fighting the fire using Fire King No. 1 (Chicago's first pump engine). In the re-enactment, a cow knocked over a lantern (according to lore), a replica of the O'Leary barn was burned down, and firemen used modern equipment to fight a fire in a mock-up of a three-story building. Following this spectacle there were police drills, performances by two police quartets, and a polo match. The teams in the polo match were led by Chicago Tribune owner Robert R. McCormick and Hotel Sherman manager Frank Bering. McCormick's team won 5–4.
- November 11: 1924 Midwest Catholic League championship, a College football game between Viator College and Columbia College of Dubuque. The game raised funds for an American Legion fund for disabled veterans. The game ended 0–0. Due to poor weather conditions, its attendance was only 2,000. This was the first college football in the stadium's history.

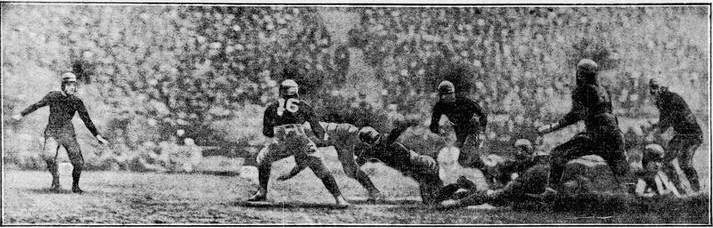
Notre Name Fighting Irish vs. Northwestern American football game held on November 22, 1924

- November 22: Notre Dame Fighting Irish football vs. Northwestern college football game attended by 45,000 spectators. Notre Dame won 13–6. This was the first football game between two major college teams in the stadium's history. Northwestern's Ralph "Moon" Baker (a member of the College Football Hall of Fame) would later say that this game, during which he kicked two field goals (one 34 and the other 36 yards) against the 1924 Notre Dame team that featured the "Four Horsemen", was the greatest thrill of his career.
- December: state amateur horseshoe pitching tournament sponsored by the Ogden Park Horseshoe Pitching Club and Chicago Playground Council.
- October 10 (the 53rd anniversary of the Great Chicago Fire): an additional dedication of the stadium was held.
- Late 1924: South Park commissioners erected an ice rink in the stadium.

=== 1925 ===
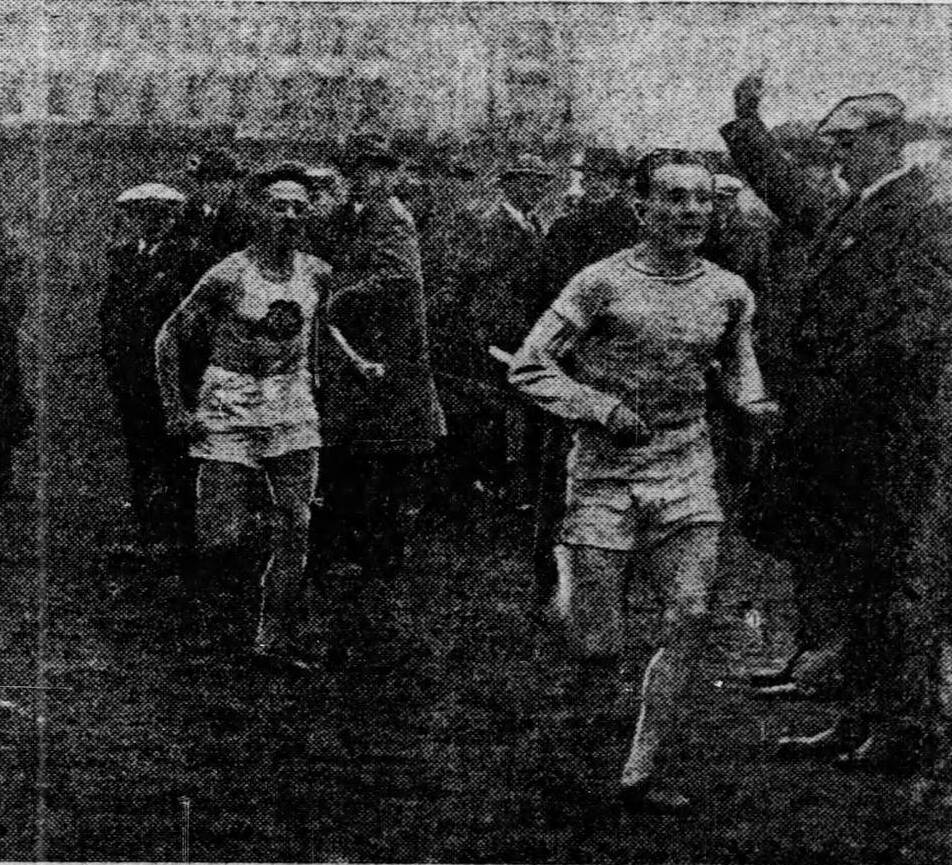
Paavo Nurmi defeating Ville Ritola in the 3,000 meter race at the 1925 Loyola Relays

- April 19: Loyola Relays; for the first time, Soldier Field held the Loyola Relays intercollegiate athletics meet. Paavo Nurmi won many of the events. Nurmi was in the last several weeks of a five-month US tour (during which he participated in 55 competitions) following his performance while completing for Finland at the 1924 Summer Olympics (where he received five gold medals). Also competing was fellow Finnish Olympian Ville Ritola, who was also a United States resident and had traveled with Nurmi during his tour. Nurmi defeated Ritola in the meet.
- May 9: Soldier Field hosted the South Parks Marble Championship. The tournament included both adult and juvenile competitions.
- May 22–25: the 65th Reserves and its superior outfit, the Army's Sixth Corps, sponsored the first of numerous military pageants held at Soldier Field. There were two shows a day, airplane fights in the afternoon, searchlights and antiaircraft-mimicking fireworks in the evening. The highlight of the day shows was a radio-dispatched arrangement of warplanes flying over the stadium. Audience members could hear the air-to-ground radio communication via the stadium's state-of-the-art loudspeaker system, and watch the planes respond to the ground command and perform stunts. 25,000 attended the first afternoon show, among them Vice President Charles G. Dawes. The temperature was 92 degrees. The show reenacted the Battle of the Argonne utilizing, among other things, a smoke screen and four tanks. In the first night show's reenactment an infantryman was injured when he was trampled by horses, and prior to that show a policeman partaking in a Roman-style horse race was thrown from his horse and also injured. For the final day wind kept the planes grounded, and the crowd was small due to chilly temperature that peaked near 40 degrees. Nonetheless, entire event was deemed a success.
- May: Soldier Field held and event dubbed the "first annual Chicago Olympics", an athletics event sponsored by the Finnish-American Athletic Association. Notable male competitors include Finnish five-time Olympic gold medalist (and three-time silver medalist) Ville Ritola, Finnish two-time Olympic gold medalist Jonni Myyrä, American two-time Olympic gold medalist Harold Osborne. Notable female competitors included US Women's Athletics legends Helen Filkey, Norma Zilk, and Nellie Todd (who, along with Zilk, was a protégé of University of Chicago track coach Tom Eck). Norma Filkey set a record in hurdles at the event, Jonni Myyrä set a javelin record at the event, Harold Osborne won as the best overall athlete of the competition, and Ville Ritola won the 2-mile race. Due largely to 90-degree heat only 2,500 spectators attended this event.
- June 13–14 Soldier Field hosted the 1925 NCAA Men's Track and Field Championships. Notable competitors included DeHart Hubbard, Morgan Taylor, Glenn Hartranft, Tom Poor, Phil Northrup, Frank Potts, Clifford Ellsworth "Biff" Hoffman, and Hugo Leistner.
- July 4 and 5: Soldier Field held its first Independence Day celebration.

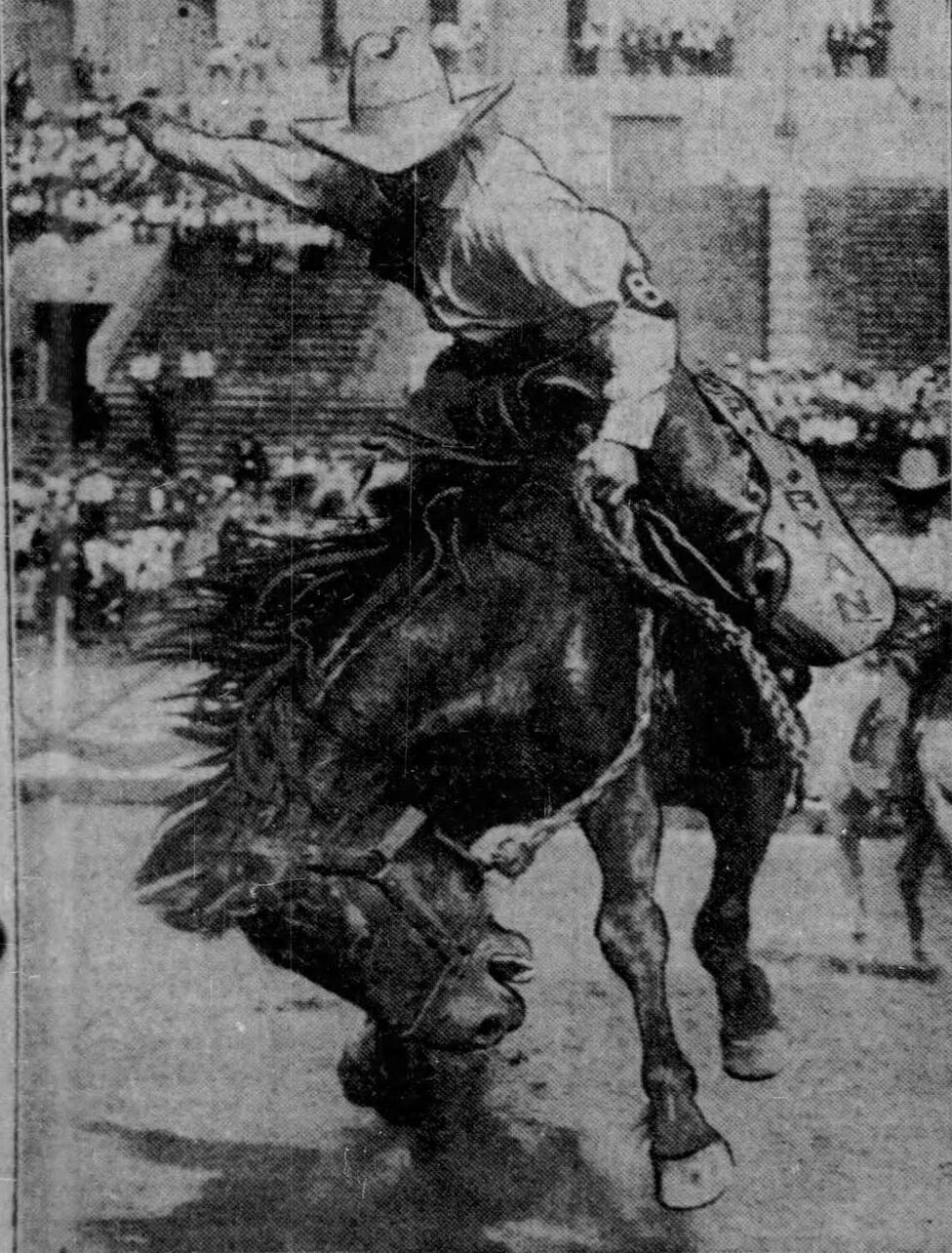
Paddy Ryan competes in the 1925 Chicago Roundup

- August 15–24, 1925 the Chicago Association of Commerce sponsored the 1925 Chicago Roundup, a Tex Austin-organized nine-day professional rodeo competition at Soldier Field. Vice President of the United States Charles G. Dawes at the opening ceremonies. The ceremonies were initiated with a parade of participants and officials. Among the officials was Anti-Cruelty Society director Chauncey McCormick, and among the competitors was Pete Knight. 30,000 spectators watched the opening ceremonies, and 100,000 spectators attended the two competitive events held August 15. Daily attendance averaged 70,000 for the competition, one day the combined attendance for two events was 170,000.
- September 20: Chicago's German-American community held its first annual German Day event at Soldier Field, featuring a soccer match, athletics, performances and ceremonies. The event raised funds for numerous charities. German Day events were held annually at Soldier Field until 1937, regularly drawing crowds in excess of 40,000.
- November 7 Northwestern played Michigan at Soldier Field. 70,000 tickets had been sold, but just over 40,000 spectators attended due to severely inclement weather. Northwestern won 3–2.
- November 11: the American Legion and South Park commissioners organized a commemoration of Armistice Day marking the stadium's name change from "Grant Park Municipal Stadium" to "Soldier Field". The day began the firing of guns at sunrise. At eleven in the morning, a 21-gun salute was fired in Chicago's Grant Park and people in the 'Chicago Loop' paused, men removing their hats, and held moment of silent prayer and reflection. In the afternoon, former Governor of Illinois Frank Lowden and naval officer John A. Rodgers were the guests of honor in the ceremonies held at Soldier Field. At the time Rodgers was a national hero, following his attempted nonstop flight two months earlier, and was all-over the news. Lowden had been heavily involved in the effort to rename Soldier Field. Much like Rodgers, Lowden was also a prominent national political figure at the time. The event at Soldier Field began with decorated war veterans escorting Gold Star Mothers to their seats, and a salute fired by field artillery. The Flag of the United States was then raised, followed with a large banner baring the words 'Soldier Field' that had been carried into the stadium by the Gold Star Mothers. This was followed with a parade led by an Army general. The parade featured sailors from the nearby Great Lakes Naval Station, Reserve Officers' Training Corps units, and various veterans groups (including the Grand Army of the Republic). Following the procession of the parade, Rodgers spoke about his attempted non-stop flight. Other speakers included South Park Board-member, and future-mayor, Edward J. Kelley. The ceremony was attended by over 20,000 spectators.

=== 1926 ===
- After success of the 1925 Chicago Roundup, Soldier Field hosted another Chicago Roundup in 1926. The 1926 Chicago Roundup was also a great success, even managing to draw 35,000 spectators on a rainy day.
- June: Soldier Field hosted the 1926 NCAA Men's Track and Field Championships. This was the second consecutive edition held at Soldier Field. The event was dubbed "the college Olympics of America". Notable competitors included Bud Houser, Bob King, John Kuck, Herman Brix (later known by his stage-name Bruce Bennet), William Droegemueller, Fred Alderman, Tom Sharkey, Harry Hawkins, Leighton Dye, Ray Conger, Anton Burg, Phil Northrup, George Hester, and George Guthrie.

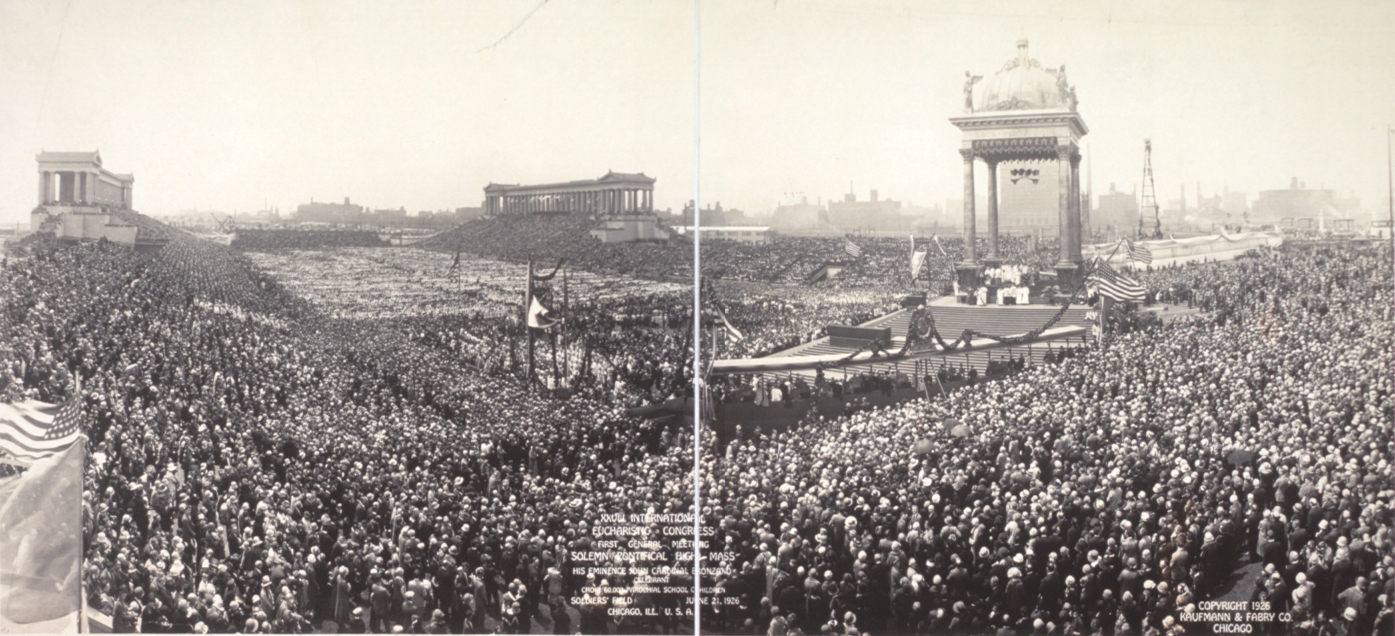
1926 Eucharistic Congress

- June 21–23: 28th International Eucharistic Congress held three days of outdoor day and evening events at Soldier Field. Mass was held for a total of 30,000 gathered both in and outside of Soldier Field's gates (150,000 inside the stadium, and a further 150,000 outside of it).
- July 4: marking the nation's sesquicentennial (150th anniversary), the Loyal Order of Moose arranged an Independence Day program for Soldier Field.
- July 27: 50,000 people attended a program held by the Lutherans from the Missouri Synod to commemorate the USA's sesquicentennial.

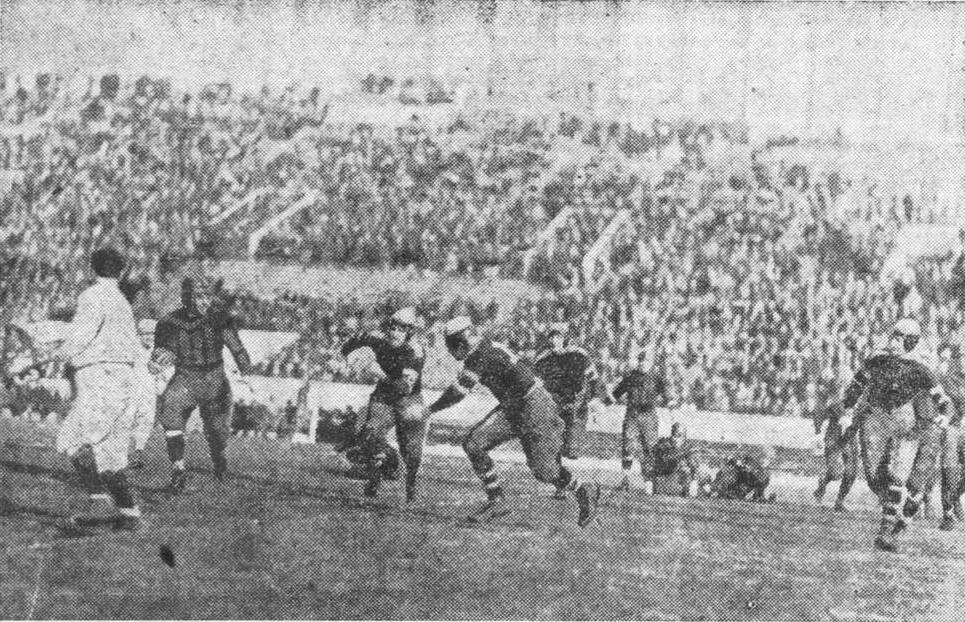
The Chicago Bears play the Chicago Cardinals on November 11, 1926

- November 11 (Armistice Day):
  - Stadium is renamed "Soldier Field"
  - 10,000 spectators watched as Soldier Field hosted its first professional American football game, a match between the Chicago Bears and the Chicago Cardinals of the NFL. The Bears defeated an injury-ridden Cardinals. Cardinals halfback Red Dunn breaking his leg above the ankle. The first Bears touchdown in Soldier Field History occurred second quarter when quarterback Paddy Driscoll (who incidentally had previously played for the Cardinals) threw a forty-yard pass to Duke Hanny, the game's sole touchdown. Driscoll also kicked for the extra point, and scoring a field goal later in the second period. The game benefited the construction of Rosary College, which today is known as Dominican University.
- November 26: the stadium was officially rededicated as "Soldier Field" at a free public event held at the stadium. Among those participating in the ceremony was Vice President of the United States Charles G. Dawes.

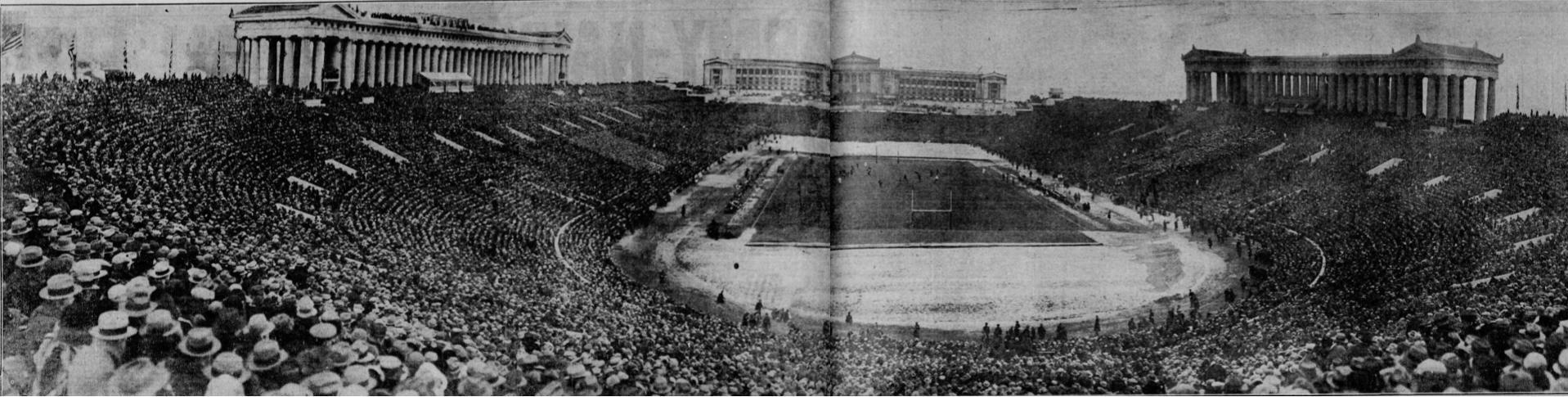
1926 Army–Navy Game

- November 27: 1926 Army–Navy Game, attended by over 110,000 spectators. The game was the deciding game for who would be named the national collegiate football champion, as Navy entered undefeated and Army had lost only to Notre Dame. The game was considered to have lived up to its hype, and ended in a 21–21 tie. Navy was awarded the national championship. Amongst the 110,000 in attendance (which at the time was the largest crowd for a football game) were the vice president of the United States Charles G. Dawes as well as the United States Secretary of the Navy Curtis D. Wilbur. Also in attendance was legendary Notre Dame Fighting Irish football coach Knute Rockne, who considered the game at Soldier Field important enough to warrant his missing his own team's game against Carnegie Tech that day (a game which Rockne's undefeated Fighting Irish lost in an upset that was ranked the fourth-greatest upset in college football history by ESPN) The game was also broadcast nationally on radio, a notable early use of the rising broadcast medium. Walter Eckersdall of the Chicago Tribune dubbed it to be "one of the greatest football games ever played", and proclaimed that it had been seen by "the largest crowd that ever saw a football game in this country". More than a decade later, the readers of Esquire magazine voted this the best football game of all time. Even today many revere this as the greatest Army-Navy game ever.
- November 28: 12,000 spectators saw the Kansas City Cowboys defeat the Chicago Cardinals 7-2 at Soldier Field. This marked the first Time in which a football game benefiting causes related to the Chicago Sisters of Mercy (amongst them the order's Catholic high schools and Mercy Hospital) was held. It would be held annually thereafter until 1951. Most often it featured a matchup of two Catholic League schools (commonly Saint Rita and Leo). Some years the game included professional or college teams. The game usually attracted between 20,000 and 30,000 spectators. It was started by Sister Mary Ricardo, who decided a football game would be a good annual fundraiser after a meeting with Chris O'Brien. O'Brien suggested that a game against the Kansas City Cowboys could be moved from Comiskey Park to Soldier Field.
- 30,000 attended a game between Prague's AC Sparta and a Chicago all-star team.

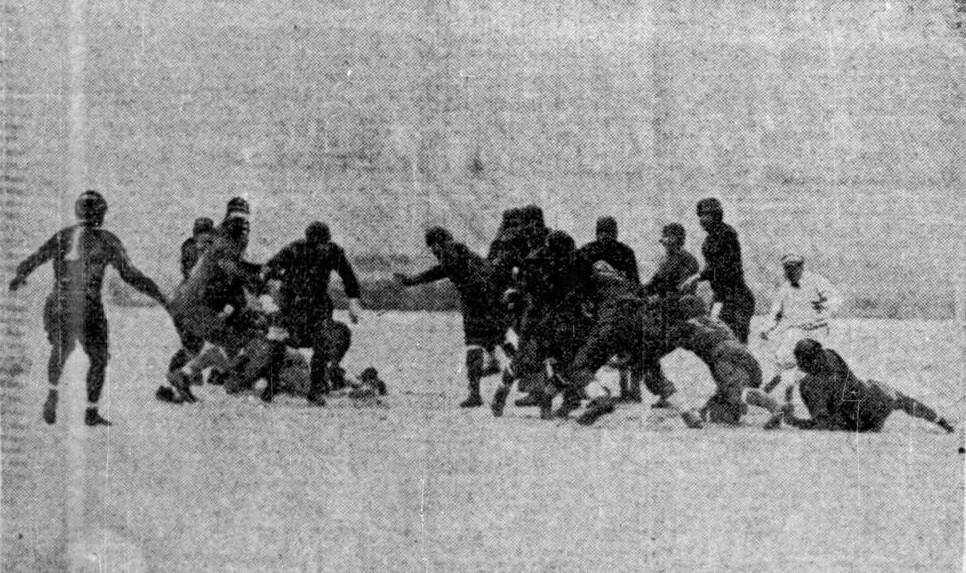
Chicago Bears play the Green Bay Packers on December 19, 1926

- December 19: Chicago Bears vs. Green Bay Packers game, attended by 10,000 spectators. Ended in a 3–3 tie. Proceeds of the game benefited the P.J. Carr Christmas Fund. The game had the potential of determining the champion of the 1926 NFL season if the Frankford Yellow Jackets (from Philadelphia) lost their final game of the season, but the Yellow Jackets won their last game and were named the season's champions.

=== 1927 ===
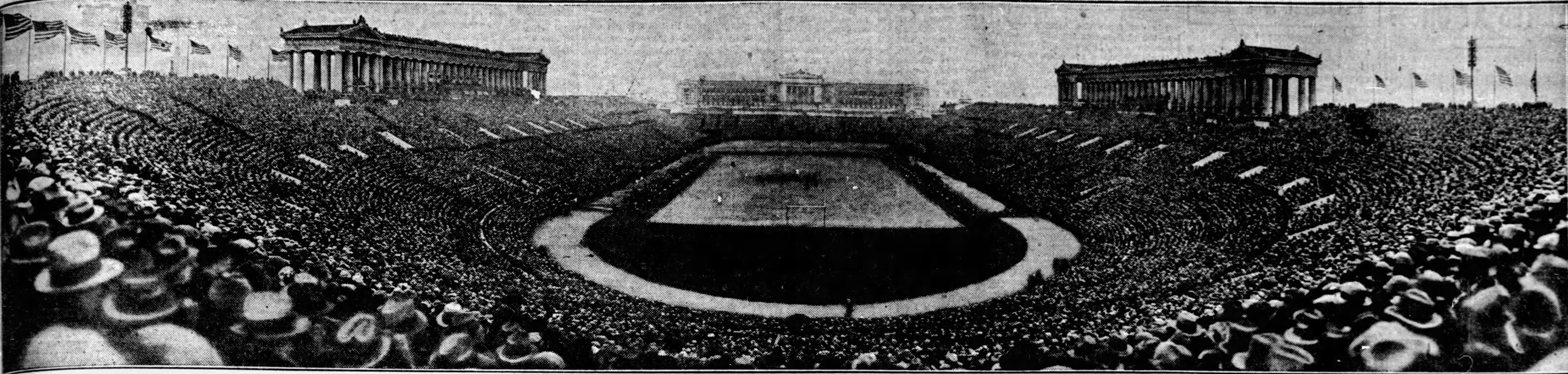
The USC Trojans and Notre Dame Fighting Irish football teams play each other on November 26 before a record crowd

- In the spring of 1927, Hakoah Vienna played several games at Soldier Field. They won their first two matches, defeating a Peel Cup All-Stars team and Chicago Sparta, but were defeated 2–1 by an Illinois All-Stars team consisting of players from the Illinois State Football Association.
- August 13 Charles Lindberg made appearances before crowds at both Soldier Field and Comiskey Park.
- The 1927 Chicago Roundup was an even greater success than the first two Chicago Roundups, attracting more than 350,000 spectators in its 9-day run.
- In 1927 Soldier Field hosted the National Interscholastic Championship. Eddie Tolan of Cass Technical High School in Detroit won the 100 and 220-yard dashes, events he would go on to win gold medals and set records for at the 1932 Summer Olympics.
- In June Soldier Field hosted the 1927 NCAA Men's Track and Field Championships. This was the third consecutive edition held at Soldier Field. Among the notable competitors were Fred Alderman, Ed Hamm, Doral Pilling, James Corson, Frank Cuhel, Lee Bartlett, Tiny Gooch, and Pete Rasmus.
- In 1927 Chicago Sparta played an exhibition match against the Uruguay national football team, winners of gold at the 1924 Olympic Games.
- September 22 The Long Count Fight, the second heavyweight championship boxing bout between Jack Dempsey and Gene Tunney, was held at Soldier Field. The event was attended by 104,943 spectators.
- October 15: Loyola Ramblers are defeated 0–19 in a football game against the Saint Louis Billikens
- October 30 15,000 spectators saw the NFL's New York Yankees defeat the Chicago Cardinals 7-6 in a game held at Soldier Field.

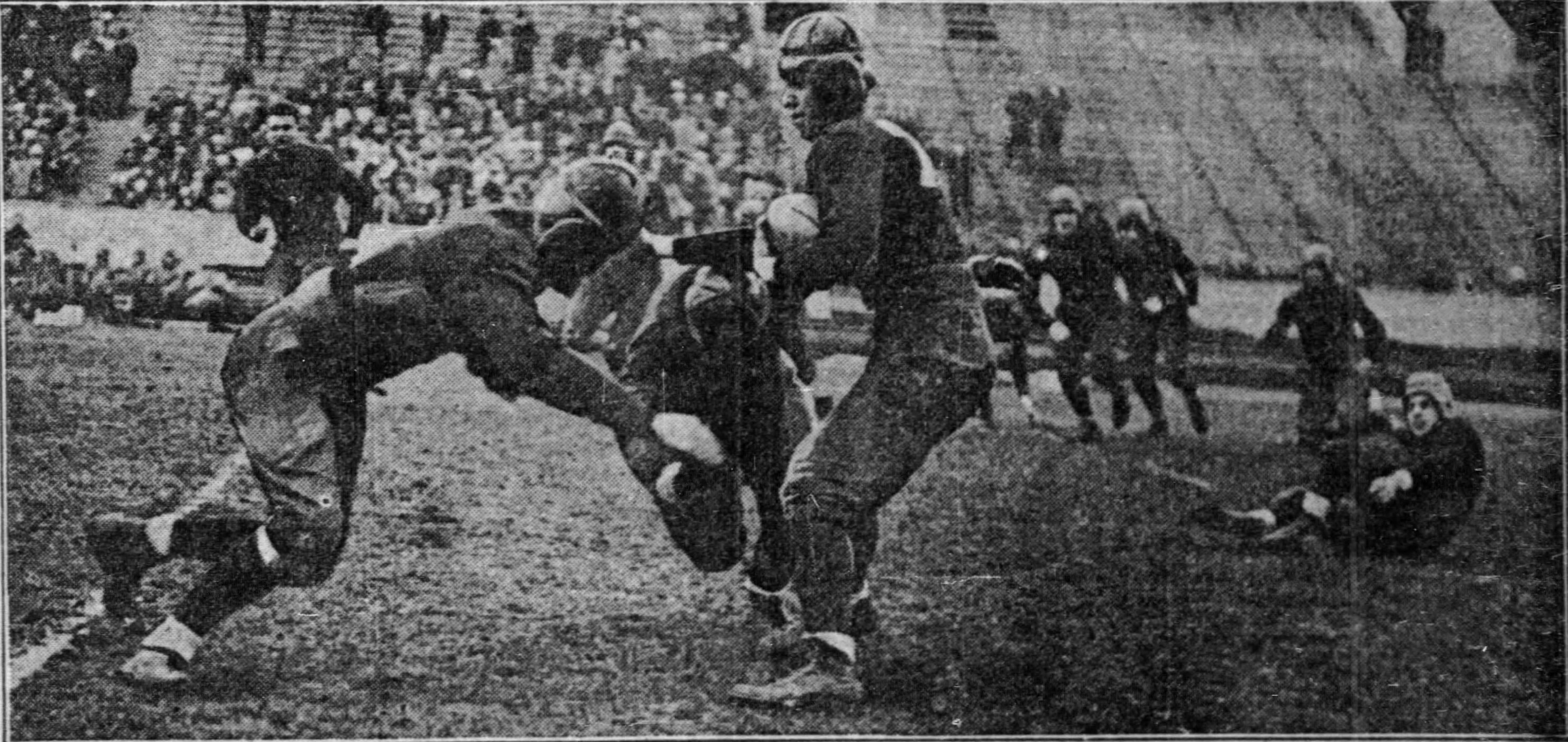
Loyola Ramblers vs. Dayton Flyers football game (November 5, 1927)

- November 5: Loyola Ramblers are defeated 0–12 in a football against Dayton
- November 26 the all-time collegiate attendance record of 123,000 plus was established as Notre Dame beat USC 7–6. Amongst those in attendance was Los Angeles mayor George E. Cryer. In preparation for this game a thousand seats were added by the South Park Board to the venue, and a proclamation was issued by Chicago mayor Big Bill Thomson encouraging residents to decorate their houses with the Flag of the United States and the colors of the two opposing teams.
- November 27 5,000 fans saw the Cleveland Bulldogs defeat the Chicago Cardinals 32-7.
- December 3 the first Prep Bowl was held. 50,000 spectators attended the game, which saw Mount Carmel defeat Schurz 6–0.

=== 1928 ===
- Soldier Field was one of the venues of the 1928 National Challenge Cup association football tournament. Notable players included the Nationals' Geordie Henderson and Siegfried Wortmann, as well as the Bricklayers' Clem Cuthbert.

Date	Team #1	Result	Team #2	Round	Attendance
January 15, 1928	Swedish-American A.C.	0-4	Chicago Canadian Club	Western Division, First Round	
January 22, 1928	Vienna F.C.	1-0	Thistles F.C	Western Division, First Round	
January 22, 1928	Chicago Sparta	2-0	Olympia F.C.	Western Division, First Round	
February 5, 1928	Chicago Bricklayers	4-0	Buda AA	Western Division, Second Round	
February 26, 1928	Bricklayers	1-0	Chicago Sparta	Western Division, Semifinals	
April 15, 1928	Bricklayers	0-3	New York Nationals	Tournament final (tiebreaker game)	15,000

- June: Soldier Field hosted the 1928 NCAA Men's Track and Field Championships. This was the fourth consecutive edition held at Soldier Field. Among the notable competitors were Emerson Spencer, Ed Hamm, Victor Pickard, Bob King George Simpson, Frank Cuhel, William Droegemueller, Harlow Rothert, Herman Brix (later known by his stage-name Bruce Bennet), Eric Krenz, Lee Bartlett, Ward Edmonds, George Hester, Claude Bracey, and Wilford Ketz.
- June: a Women's track meet sponsored by the Chicago Evening American was held at Soldier Field, The meet featured many notable participants, but it is best remembered as the debut of future Olympic legend Betty Robinson. In the 100-meter race, Robinson set a world-record with a time of 12 seconds (the previous record was 12.6) in a semi-final qualifying heat (despite a strong north wind), and finished with the same time in the final, defeating Helen Filkey by 1 yard. Robinson was only 16 years of age at the time.
- In 1928 Tex Austin staged his final Soldier Field rodeo event. The event featured celebrities such as Hoot Gibson and Tom Mix. During the event Gibson shot scenes for his movie King of the Rodeo.
- 1928 Peel Cup finals.
- October 13: Notre Dame defeated Navy in a 7–0 game. This game was attended by 120,000 spectators. This game is argued to have until the 2016 Battle at Bristol held the all-time collegiate attendance record, as some sources (such as the Chicago Tribune) reported the November 25, 1927 match at Soldier Field to have had a then all-time high attendance of 117,000, while the NCAA recorded the attendance as 120,000, which it deems to be the 'largest pre-1948 regular season college football attendance'. A figure of 123,000 was reported by the official Park District attendance count.
- November 17: Loyola Ramblers are defeated 6–13 in a football game against the Quantico Marines
- December 1: Loyola Ramblers defeat the DePaul Blue Demons football team 7–0

=== 1929 ===
- In 1929 Soldier Field hosted its first national Sokol slet, a sports gathering. In the USA the national slets are held every four years. The 1929 slet drew 25,000. Slets included gymnastics competitions and track and field events amongst other sports. At the 1929 slet athletes from 1,200 US Sokol organizations participated in Olympic-style individual gymnastic events. Also, in the 1929 slet 2,000 Chicago youth partook in a mass gymnastic drill timed to orchestral music.
- In 1929 Soldier Field again hosted the South Parks Marble Championship.
- October 19 90,000 spectators saw Notre Dame defeat Wisconsin in a 19–0.
- In 1929 Soldier Field held its second-ever firefighting demonstration.
- October 26 was the first time that a long-running football rivalry game between Tuskegree and Wilberforce University (both historically black colleges) was held at Soldier Field. This was second time that this rivalry was ever played. The 1929 game also provided a championship among historically black colleges. Tuskegee's star player was College Football Hall of Fame-inducted running back Ben Stevenson. The game was attended by 12,000 spectators. The game was thereafter played annually at Soldier Field until 1942, the only three exceptions being 1931 when game held at Mills Stadium in Chicago, 1932 when in place of this matchup Wilberforce played a different team at another venue in Chicago, and 1937 when the game was cancelled. After 1942 the game was moved Chicago's Comiskey Park, where it was played annually until 1949. Overall, Wilberforce recorded nine victories, Tuskegee recorded eight victories, and three games were tied in the rivalry series. The rivalry series was remembered endearingly by many in Chicago's African-American community, notably singer Lou Rawls.
- November 3: Loyola Ramblers football team defeats the DePaul Blue Demons 13-0 before a crowd of 51,000
- November 9: Notre Dame Fighting Irish football team defeated Drake 19–7.
- November 16: Notre Dame Fighting Irish football team defeated USC 19–12.

== 1930s ==
Postcards depicting how Soldier Field looked in the 1930s and 40s
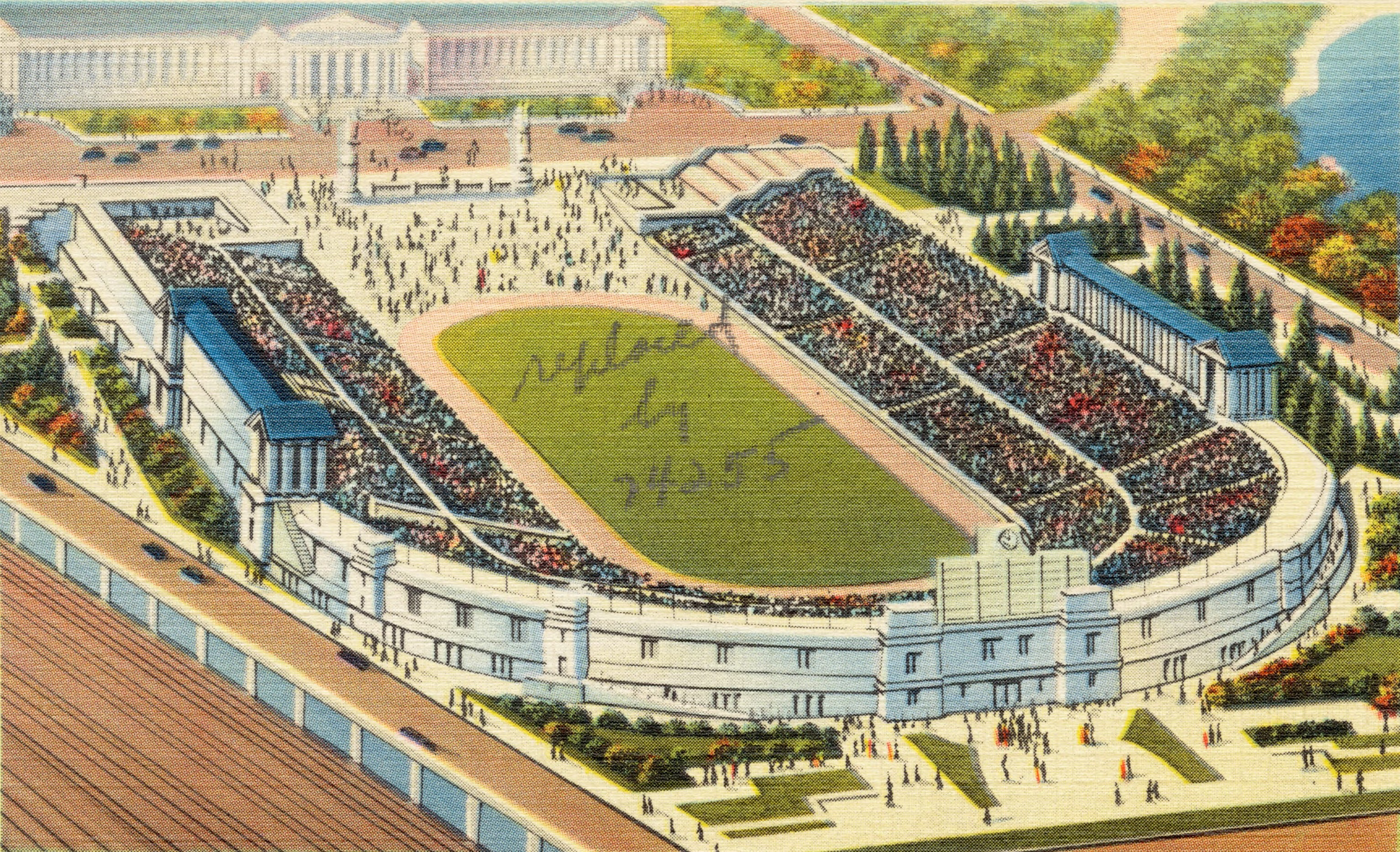
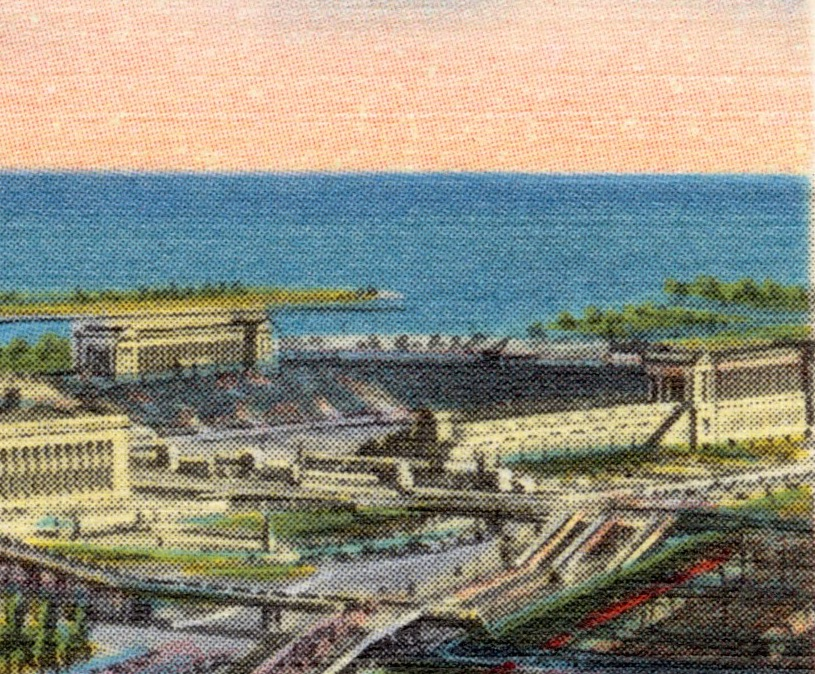

=== 1930 ===
- August 23: 150,000 people (with thousands more being denied admission) attended the first annual Chicagoland Music Festival. The Chicagoland Music Festival was an event both organized sponsored by the Chicago Tribune, and ran for 26 years. The inaugural edition was jam-packed with performances, including a performance of the Anvil Chorus from Giuseppe Verdi's opera Il trovatore, a rendition of the Hallelujah Chorus from George Frideric Handel's Messiah sung by the entire audience, numerous John Philip Sousa marches, and spirituals like Swing Low, Sweet Chariot. Thousands of performers were involved in the event, amongst them was Douglas, Michigan's 92-year-old W. T. Kimsey, an American Civil War veteran who had been a drummer in the army of Ulysses S. Grant at the Battle of Shiloh. Kimsey performed using the same drum that he played at the Battle of Shiloh.
- In 1930 a multiple-day track meet at held at Soldier Field attracted over 40,000 spectators to its last night of events. The event was a multinational competition between athletes from the British Empire a team of US competitors. Similar events had been hosted in England, but the one at Soldier Field being the first hosted in the United States. Notable participants included Ralph Metcalfe.
- In 1930 the Chicago Daily News sponsored an event benefitting the Chicago firefighter's benevolent association. This would become an annual event.
- 20,000 spectators attended the 1930 Public League championship, which substituted for the Prep Bowl (which was not played in either 1929 nor in 1930, and was decided by forfeit in 1928).

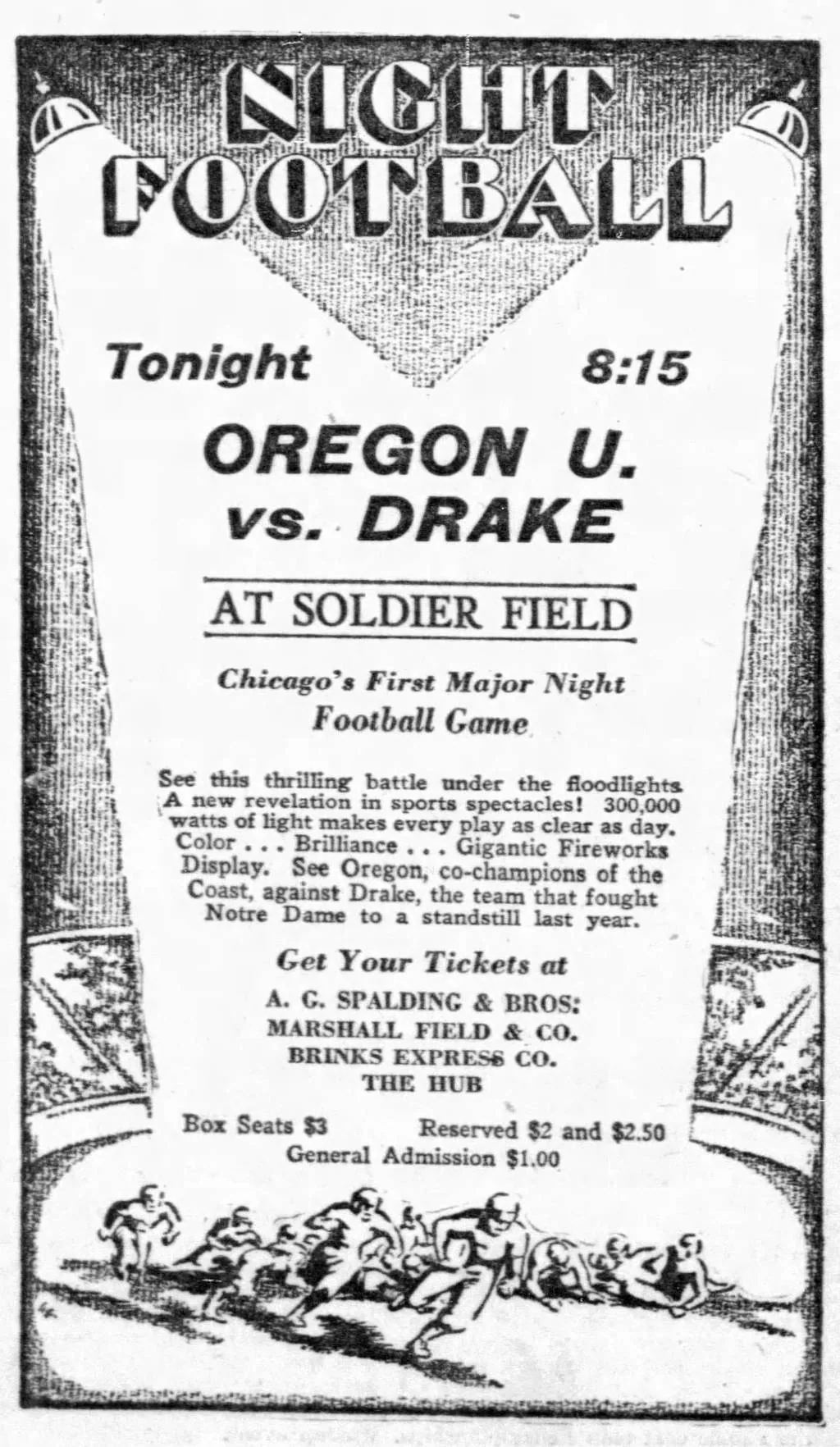
Advertisement for the stadium's night football game on October 3, 1930

- October 3: Soldier Field hosted its first night football game when the Oregon Ducks defeated the Drake Bulldogs 14–7 before a crowd of 12,000. This was followed by a second college football game at Soldier Field between the Loyola Ramblers and the Georgetown Hoyas. These two games were the first-ever intersectional night games to be played in Chicago.
- October 9: William Randolph Hearst spoke at Soldier Field.
- November 3: Loyola Ramblers are defeated 0–6 in a football game against the DePaul Blue Demons
- November 29: Notre Dame defeat Army 7–6 in football

=== 1931 ===
- January 1931: the Woman's Benefit Association held its annual Pageant at Soldier Field.
- The second Chicagoland Music Festival, held in 1931, featured John Philip Sousa.
- May 12: Soldier Field held its first amateur boxing event. This event was a Golden Gloves tournament sponsored by the Chicago Tribune. The tournament had outgrown its former home at the Chicago Stadium, and was moved to Soldier Field that year. The Chicago-based Golden Gloves tournament was the brain-child of Arch Ward, and was first held in 1923, before a brief state ban, and again was revived in 1928. It had begun as a local contest, but quickly became a regional Midwestern and finally a national amateur championship. In 1931 it became an international event, with the addition of international competitors, in the case of the 1931 tournament 10 young Frenchmen were invited to participate. To ensure that in the case of rain the event could be moved to the Chicago Stadium, only 21,000 tickets were sold in advance, but on the day of the fights 40,000 showed up at Soldier Field. The ring was placed in the center of Soldier Field's arena, and was surrounded by 22,000 'ringside seats' placed on a giant, slightly sloped, floor. The bouts were kicked off following a band and fireworks. In the first bout Leo Rodak defeated André Perrier for the flyweight title.
- August: the Ringling Brothers Barnum and Bailey Circus perform in Soldier Field's parking lot. For decades thereafter, the circus would hold summer performances in the stadium's parking lot.
- October 10: a crowd of 65,000 Notre Dame played Northwestern to a scoreless tie.
- November 28: Purdue defeated Northwestern 7-0 in a special post-season collegiate football game at Soldier Field. Proceeds of the match went to charity.

=== 1932 ===
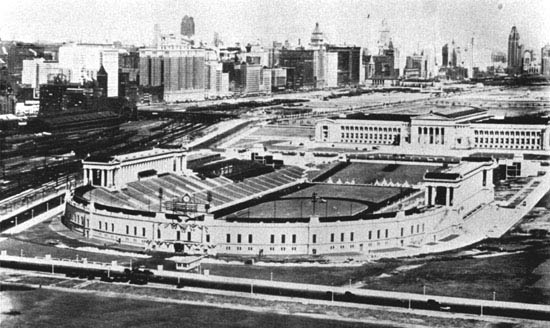
Soldier Field in 1932

- June 24-July 4: United States Army Military Tournament is held to celebrate the bicentennial of George Washington's birth. The event included aerial demonstrations, combat enactments, artillery demonstrations, Olympic-style athletics competition, a parade, and pyrotechnic displays. Involved in the aerial demonstrations was Major Gerald E. Brower. The June 24 show at the start of the eleven-day run was opened at 8pm with a flyover by four squadrons of fighter planes escorting a plane being flown by Amelia Earhart. The planers were painted to resemble a red and white eagle. Earhart later landed and made her way to the stadium, where she was given a gold medal and then developed a speech to the crowd about her flight across the atlantic the previous year. The event was cover over radio.
- July 27: Soldier Field held the second-ever Chicago Golden Gloves tournament. More than 45,000 spectators attended (organizers of the event lauded it as the largest crowd in the world to have ever seen an amateur boxing tournament). This tournament featured Olympic-caliber participants from Germany. American participants won 4 of the matches, and German participants won four as well. Three of the German participants (bantamweight Hans Ziglarski, featherweight Josef Schleinkofer, and welterweight Erich Campe) would go on to win silver in the boxing competition at the 1932 Summer Olympics held in Los Angeles several weeks later.
- A 1932 post-Olympic track meet was held at Soldier Field featuring teams from 15 nations. Notable participants included US Olympian Ralph Metcalfe.

=== 1933 ===
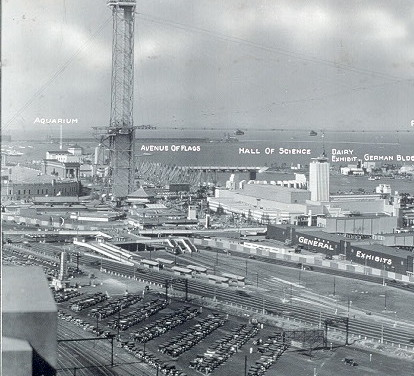
Soldier Field (far left) and the adjacent Century of Progress World's Exposition in 1933

- May 27: Soldier Field opening ceremonies of the Century of Progress Worlds Fair. James Farley (the postmaster general) officially presided over the opening ceremony.
- In 1933, attendance for the stadium's annual war show was especially high.
- June: an NCAA track meet was held at Soldier Field, and featured such notable participants as african american track stars Ralph Metcalfe and Jesse Owens. Five records were set at this meet, one of which was set by Metcalfe. Both Owens and Metclaffe would go on to participate in the Summer Olympics (Owens in 1936 Summer Olympics and Metclaffe in both 1932 Summer Olympics and 1936), and are now largely regarded as US Olympic legends. Metclaffe, a native Chicagoan, would later be elected to as an Illinois congressman, serving four terms in the United States House of Representatives.
- At the 1933 German Day Festival, George Seibel, a Pittsburgh lawyer, writer, friend of the novelist Willa Cather, and the national president of the American Turnerbund (a Turnerist group) spoke about the contributions of German immigrants to American democracy.
- In conjunction with the Century of Progress World's Fair, a very successful rodeo event was held at Soldier Field.
- In conjunction with the Century of Progress World's Fair, Soldier Field again hosted the South Parks Marble Championship in 1933.
- In conjunction with Texas Day at the World's Fair, an all-Texan cast performed a production of Aida.
- June 25, 1933: 50,000 attended a national Sokol slet (gymnastics festival) with more than 1000 participants at Soldier Field.
- July 3: 150,000 spectators attended A Romance of a People, an immensely elaborate Jewish pageant telling the history of the Jewish people, staged at Soldier Field. The event was coordinated by Meyer Weisgal. Chaim Weizmann (head of the World Zionist Organization and would later become the first President of Israel) gave a speech to open the show. The show required over 6,000 performers. The event was so successful that it was given a repeat performance a few days later at Soldier Field 75,000 spectators attended the repeat performance.
- A celebration the 300th anniversary of the first Swedish to immigrate to the United States was held at Soldier Field.
1933 Piccard-Settle stratospheric flight

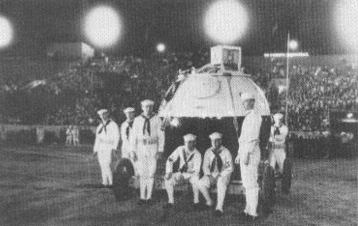
Navy members with the balloon's gondola.

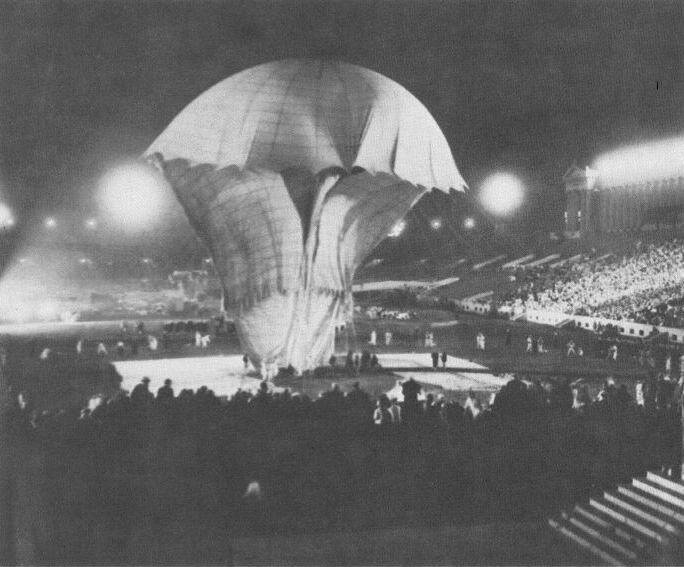
Balloon taking off before and audience of 44,000 at Soldier Field

- August 3: Soldier Field held its final Chicago Golden Gloves tournament. This tournament was held in conjunction of Chicago's 1933–1934 Century of Progress World's Fair. More than 48,000 people attended the matches, despite a one-day postponement due to rain. This tournament featured participants from Ireland. The first two bouts were won by Irish participants, but the next six were won by American participants. Irish heavyweight champion Patrick Mulligan was knocked out broke his ankle during his bout. This was the last edition of the Chicago Golden Gloves to be held at Soldier Field. The tournament has been held at other Chicago venues ever-since.
- August 4: 40,000 spectators witnessed the inflation of the world's largest hydrogen gas balloon in preparation for a stratospheric flight from Soldier Field by Jeannette and Auguste Piccard.
- August 12: Soldier Field hosted a national African American athletic meet in conjunction with the 'Negro Day' event held at the Century of Progress World's Fair. The event featured such notable athletes as Olympic gold medalists Edward Gordon and DeHart Hubbard (the first African American to win an Olympic gold medal).
- August 12, coinciding with the Fair's Negro Day, an African American pageant entitled Epic of a Race was performed at Soldier Field. Chandler Owen, who headed the organization of Negro Day events, employed author and WJJD radio staffer Andrew Dobson as the author and theatrical producer and dance instructor Sammy Dyer as the director of the production. Carl Sandburg was consulted by Dobson on the historical accuracy of his script. Renowned actor Richard B. Harrison was the master of ceremonies for the event, which featured 1,500 performers, about 3,000 singers, music by the 8th Infantry Regiment Band, and portrayed 11 different historic episodes.
- 1933 Peel Cup finals
- Summer of 1933: Forty-Sixth annual National Amateur Athletic Union meet. The track and field event only managed to attract just over 8,000 spectators. A commentator wrote, "Judged solely by the caliber of its athletes, (it) was one of the best in the history of the modern games", but added "By the standards of attendance....the games flopped."
- 85,000 spectators attended the fourth annual Chicagoland Music Festival in 1933.
- October 1: 8,000 spectators saw the Chicago Bears defeat the Boston Redskins 7-0.
- October 7: Northwestern faced Iowa at Soldier Field. Northwestern lost 7–0.
- October 14: Northwestern tied Stanford in a scoreless game at Soldier Field.
- Mount Carmel defeated Harrison 7–0 in the 1933 Prep Bowl. The event was made official for the first time, being promoted by the Mayor of Chicago Edward Joseph Kelly himself.
- The Canadian professional soccer champion Toronto Scots played St. Louis' Stix, Baer and Fuller team, the U.S. champions, for the North American soccer title in 1933. The Scots won 2–1. This event was one of many Soldier Field sporting events that was tied-into the ongoing Worlds Fair.

=== 1934 ===
- April 1, 1934: the stadium held its first nondenominational Protestant Easter sunrise service. A year earlier a similar event had been held near the stadium at the site of the adjacent World's Fair.
- In 1934 attendance for the annual war show was high. Every night the show would end with a re-enactment of the World War I Battle of Cantigny.
- The International Motorcycle Association held a month of motorcycle races at Soldier Field beginning July 4.
- Al Jolson headlined the 1934 Chicagoland Music Festival.
- 60,000 spectators attended O' Sing a New Song, a pageant held at Soldier Field for the Worlds Fair's second Negro Day. The pageant was conceived by Associated Negro Press editor and Chicago Defender columnist Nahum Daniel Brascher and produced by notable author Noble Sissle and notable musician Eubie Blake. Sissle worked with DownBeat reporter Onah Spencer on writing the script. Widely renown musicians Harry Lawrence Freeman, W. C. Handy, Nathaniel Clark Smith, and Jimmy Mundy contributed to the production. Other contributing musicians included J. Wesley Jones, Will Marion Cook and J. Rosamond Johnson. Other notable performers included Richard B. Harrison (who served as the narrator). Among the most notable performers in the pageant was Bill Robinson. The production required 5,000 vocalists and 3,500 dancers. 200 men performed military maneuvers in a segment portraying black contributions to the armed-forces. A group of Zulus partook in a segment of the show. The show was opened by President Franklin D. Roosevelt, who pressed a button in the White House which remotely turned on the stadium's lighting. This intentionally mirrored President Grover Cleveland similarly opening the World's Columbian Exposition from the White House by pressing a button that turned-on the fairground's lights.
- A Celtic cultural pageant, Pageant of the Celt, was performed at Soldier Field. It was narrated by Micheál MacLiammoir. The pageant required a 1,000-person choir. It proved so popular that a second performance was given at Soldier Field.
- August 24: 45,000 spectators attended an all-star college football matchup between an East and a West all-star team. Harry Newman of Michigan threw a touchdown pass to Gene Ronzani of Marquette in last minutes of play, giving the East team a victory.
- August 31: a crowd of 79,432 saw the College All-Stars play the Chicago Bears to a scoreless tie in the inaugural Chicago College All-Star Game, which was the brainchild of Arch Ward (who was also the man behind the MLB All-Star Game). Like many events that were staged at Soldier Field, the College All-Star Games were sponsored by the Chicago Tribune. The game raised over $4 million for charity over the course of its 42-game run. All but two of those games were held at Soldier Field, with the other two held at Dyche Stadium in 1943 and 1944. The game is considered to have been a major contributor to the growth of professional gridiron football in the United States. Noble Kizer of Purdue had been selected by a fan vote to be the coach of the College All-Star team. Players selected by vote for the team included, quarterbacks Bernie Masterson Nebraska, Homer Griffith of USC, Joe Laws of Iowa; tackle Moose Krause; halfbacks Nick Lukats, George Sauer of Nebraska, Beattie Feathers of Tennessee; guards Tom Hupke of Alabama, Bobby Jones of Indiana, and Aaron Rosenberg of USC; ends Joe Skladany of Pittsburgh, Bill Smith of Washington and Sid Gillman of Ohio State. Other players included end Edgar Manske of Northwestern and halfback Herman Everhardus of Michigan. Both Sauer and Krause were the co-captains of the college all-star team. In addition to Kizer the all-stars' coaching staff included Mai Edwards of Purdue and Jim Crowley of Fordham (who would go on to coach the Chicago Rockets at Soldier Field). The entire game was covered in radio play-by-play, and over 120 newspapers from 22 states requested press credentials for the event.
- 50,000 people saw Lindblom defeat Leo 6–0 in the 1934 Prep Bowl.

=== 1935 ===
- Easter of 1935: 23,000 people attended the nondenominational Protestant Easter sunrise service held at Soldier Field.
- May 19: a Midwestern Auto Racing Association race begins a long tradition of midget automobile races at the stadium. Midget racing star Marshall Lewis finished first-place in the main event. 20,000 spectators attended the event.
- August 1935: when the west tower of the 1933 World Fair's Sky Ride was demolished, it fell into a portion of Soldier Field's exterior walls, requiring $50,000 in repairs.

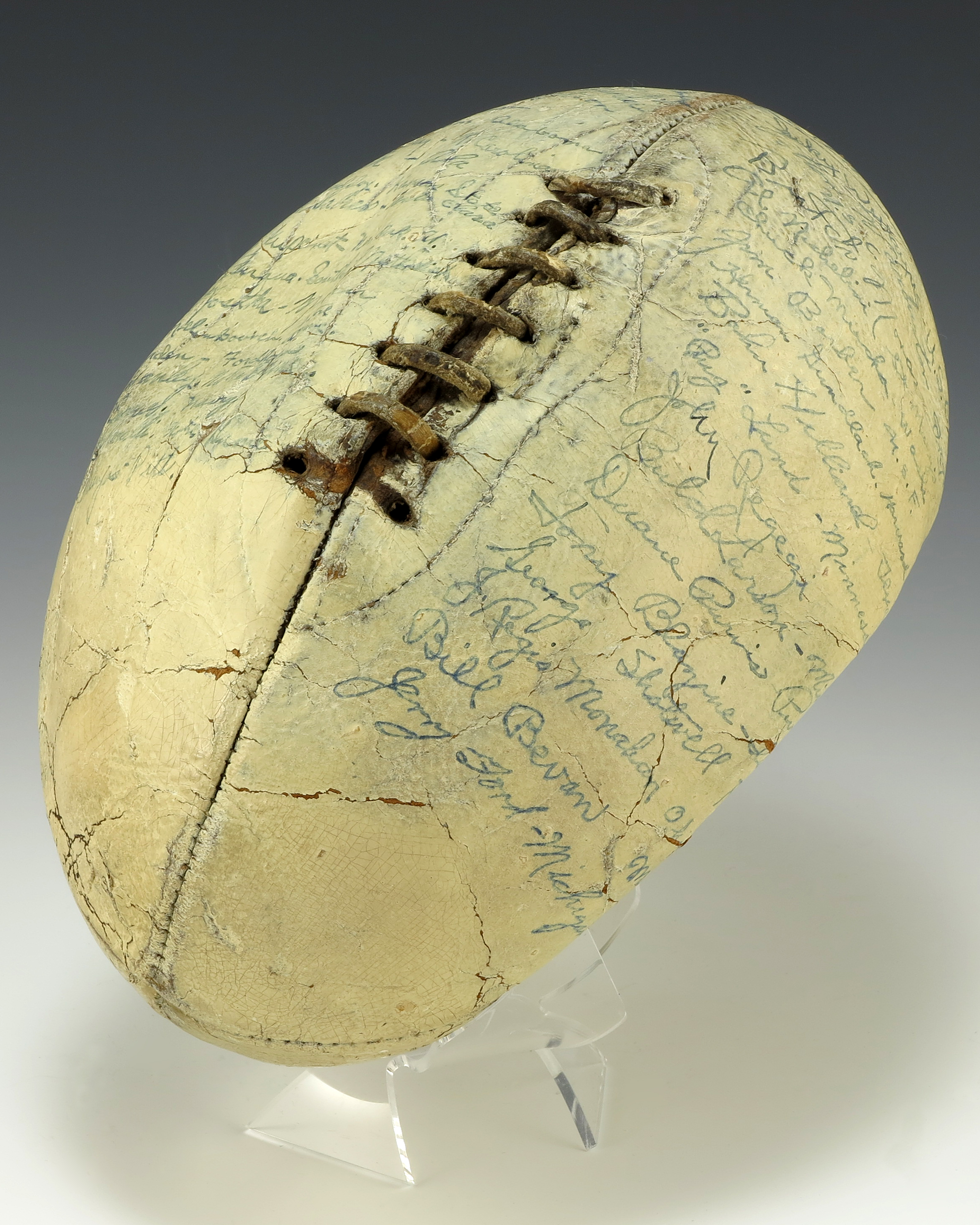
Football signed by all of the 1933 College All-Stars

- August 29: 1935 Chicago College All-Star Game; 77,450 saw the Chicago Bears defeat the College All-Stars 5–0. Fans voted Frank Thomas of Alabama the collegiate all-stars' head coach. Over seven million votes were placed in the race for the position head coach. The vote became political, with numerous state governors publicly endorsing coaches. Other members of the coaching staff were Charles Bachman of Michigan State, Slip Madigan of St. Mary's, and Dr. C.W. Spears of Wisconsin. Amongst the alumni of the 1935 College All-Star team best known for their achievements outside of sports Irv Kupcinet of North Dakota (who would become a notable journalist and media personality) and Gerald Ford of Michigan (who would later serve as the President of the United States).
- 1935 Prep Bowl; 75,000 people saw Lindblom defeat Leo 6–0.

=== 1936 ===
- February 16: the U.S. Central Ski Association held its annual ski meet at Soldier Field. They built a temporary ski jump that was 13-stories, the world's tallest man-made ski jump at the time. More than 57,000 spectators attended the ski meet.
- July 22: the Chicago Catholic Youth Organization held its first boxing tournament at Soldier Field. This was an intercity boxing meet against New York's Catholic Youth Association. The proceeds of the tournament went to the CYO Mil Fund to help feed 35,000 students in nonsectarian summer schools run at Chicago Catholic schools. The Catholic Youth Organization would hold numerous intercity and international boxing tournaments at Soldier Field over the next several years.
- September 1: 1936 Chicago College All-Star Game, in which 76,000 spectators saw the College All-Stars tie the Detroit Lions 7–7.
- The 1936 edition of the German Day Festival had a greater focus on pageantry and dancing versus the sports that were the focus of previous editions.
- June: Soldier Field hosted the eastern regional semi-final tryouts for the 1936 U.S. track field Olympic trials
- In 1936, national softball championships for both men and women were held at Soldier Field. The stadium's arena was big enough to hold five softball diamonds with their home plates along the west stands (on the running track). All five were used simultaneously during the day, but only three were used at the same time for night games. Teams from 40 states and Canada participated, but rain delayed the tournament so it started two days late. A game that stood out was one attended by 15,000 spectators that featured the teams from Rochester and Cleveland facing off (Rochester, led by amateur softball legend Harold "Shifty" Gears, defeated Cleveland 2–0 in that game).
- 1936 Chicago Prep Bowl: 75,000 saw Austin tie Fenwick 19–19.
- In 1936 a game was held at Soldier Field between rival high schools Tilden and Austin was held at Soldier Field. During the game Tilden player Lou Rymkus blocked a kick and scored a touchdown. Rymkus would later refer to this as the most memorable game of his high school career.
- In late 1936 an ice rink was erected in Soldier Field.

=== 1937 ===
- February 7, 1937, the Chicago Daily Times sponsored a ski jump meet of the U.S. Central Ski Association at Soldier Field. The meet attracted 57,000 spectators, believed to be the largest crowd to ever see a ski jumping competition in the U.S. The temporary 180-foot tall all-wood ski jump tower was constructed by the Timber Engineering Company (TECO).
- In 1937 Soldier Field held many events in honor of Chicago's Charter Jubilee, which was a celebration of the centennial of Chicago's 1837 incorporation as a city. The events were held between March 4 (the date of Chicago's incorporation) and October 9 (the anniversary of the Great Chicago Fire) Amongst the events Soldier Field held in celebration of the Jubilee were boxing matches.
  - Only 12,000 attended the 1937 Easter sunrise service at Soldier Field due to cold weather. The service that year was counted as a Charter Jubilee event.
  - 50,000 attended a pageant celebrating the contributions of Polish Chicagoans held as part of the Charter Jubilee.
- In 1937 attendance for the annual war show was high.
- In 1937 Soldier Field again held national softball championships for both men and women.
- In 1937 a boxing match between Joe Louis and Jim Braddock was held at Soldier Field.
- The 1937 German Day Festival was the final edition of the event to be held at Soldier Field.
- Austin defeated Leo 26–0 to win the 1937 Prep Bowl; another contender for the highest attendance ever (estimated at over 120,000 spectators). Pre-game entertainment featured 'King of Jazz' Paul Whiteman. Austin was named High School Football National Champions that season. Their star player was Bill Deorrevont.
- In 1937 the Norge Ski Club held a ski meet at Soldier Field. A 13-story 50m ski jump was erected at Soldier Field for the event. The Norge Ski Club, which is based out of Fox River, Illinois, is the oldest continuously operating ski club in the United States.
- September 1: 84,560 saw the College All-Stars defeat the Green Bay Packers 6-0 in the College All-Star Game. The game's only points were scored when Texas Christian University's Sammy Baugh passed forty-seven yards to Louisiana State University's Gaynell Tinsley. Members of the All-Star team included Tippy Dye.

=== 1938 ===
- April 17: 50,000 attended the 1938 Easter sunrise service at Soldier Field. The service had Charles E. Fuller as its chief minister.
- July 4: as part of the American Legion Fourth of July show held at Soldier Field, a 124th Artillery team played a Cuban army team to a 3–3 tie in a polo match. Also featured in the event were color guards as well as drum and bugle corps.
- August 17: a jitterbug concert held at Soldier Field resulted in the so-called 'Jitterbug Riot' after crowds of about 200,000 overwhelmed the event's organizers. Performers at the event included Jimmy Dorsey, Earl Hines, Shep Fields. It featured a battle of the bands with 50 amateur bands and a number of the city's leading dance orchestras.
- The 1938 Chicagoland Music Festival is credited to have originated the tradition of lighting matches or lighters concerts. Among those singing was aviator Douglas Corrigan.
- In 1938 about 1,000 Police and Firemen participated in an event which raised funds for the benevolent funds of both groups.
- In 1938 Soldier Field again held national softball championships for both men and women.
- August 31 74,250 saw the College All-Stars defeat the Washington Redskins 28–16 in the Chicago College All-Star Game. The MVP was Purdue running back Cecil Isbell. The 1938 College All-Stars and the Redskins later would meet one another for a second game on September 5 in Dallas.
- September 1: 80,000 people saw Fenger defeat Mount Carmel 13–0 in the Mount Carmel 44–6 in the 1938 Prep Bowl.
- September 11: 20,000 spectators saw the Chicago Bears defeat the Chicago Cardinals 16-13.
- 1938 was the final year that the U.S. Central Ski Association held its annual ski meet at Soldier Field.

=== 1939 ===
- About 50,000 attended the 1939 Easter sunrise service held at Soldier Field.
- June 18, 20, 22, 24 and 25: the American Automobile Association held the World's Championship Midget Automobile Races on a wooden track erected in Soldier Field. Proceeds benefited the Hospital for Crippled Children's Chicago Unit. There was a $10,000 purse for the five-race series. Over 90,000 spectators attended the event. This was the second time that midget racing was held at Soldier Field. Sam Hanks won the first two races, and Ronnie Householder ultimately won Soldier Field's 1939 midget racing championship.
- Fats Waller headlined the 1939 Chicagoland Music Festival.
- Over 98,000 spectators attended a 1939 stunt show starring "Lucky" Lee Lott at Soldier Field.
- August 30: 81,456 saw the New York Giants defeat the College All-Stars 9–0 in the Chicago College All-Star Game. The MVP was Holy Cross running back Bill Osmanski.
- In 1939 the Chicago Rugby Club played two games at Soldier Field. The first game was against a Hollywood club. The second game was against a New York-East Coast all-star squad featuring high-level athletes. Chicago won the second game 24–9 and advanced to a Los Angeles game against the Hollywood Lighthorse Lancers for the national amateur rugby championship. The second game was attended by a crowd of 10,000 and was held on November 12.
- September 7: Soldier Field one last time held national softball championships for both men and women, organized by the Amateur Softball Association.
- September 15: 13,254 spectators saw the Chicago Bears defeat the Cleveland Rams 30-21.
- October 1: 11,000 spectators saw the Detroit Lions defeat the Chicago Cardinals 17-3.
- 75,000 people saw Fenger tie Mount Carmel 13–13 in the 1939 Prep Bowl.

== 1940s ==
=== 1940 ===
- March 24 the 1940 Easter sunrise service was held during one of the coldest Easters on record in Chicago. The temperature hardly reached the double-digits by the beginning of the service.
- July 4 the American Legion Fourth of July show at Soldier Field again featured a Polo match. This time it was an East-West match.
- August 5 Soldier Field hosted an isolationist "peace rally" organized by IOC member, USOC president (and future IOC vice president and IOC president) Avery Brundage. Brundage also introduced the event's featured speaker, Charles Lindberg.
- August 29 84,567 saw the Green Bay Packers defeat the College All-Stars 45–28 in the Chicago College All-Star Game. The MVP was USC Trojans running back Ambrose Schindler.
- In 1940 the Catholic Holy Name Society held their inaugural annual "Holy Hour" service at Soldier Field. The event would continue be held into the 1950s
- 75,000 saw Fenger defeat Leo 13–0 in the 1940 Prep Bowl.

=== 1941 ===
- April 13 over 50,000 saw the 1941 Easter sunrise service at Soldier Field.
- May 18, an I Am an American Day event was held at Soldier Field featuring Helen Hayes, Don Ameche, Pat O'Brien, Dennis Morgan, George Jessel, Ethel Waters, John Boles, and Paul Whiteman (with his orchestra).
- A rodeo was held at Soldier Field in 1941.
- June 15 the janitors' unions held "Americanism Day" at Soldier Field. The US Drum and Bugle Corps, American Legion Bands, high school bands, and ROTC bands performed at the event.
- August 28 98,203 saw the Chicago Bears defeat the College All-Stars 37–13 in the Chicago College All-Star Game. The MVP was Minnesota running back George Franck.
- September 14 150,000 attended the annual Catholic Holy Name Society "Holy Hour" service.
- 95,000 saw Leo defeat Tilden 46–13 in the 1941 Prep Bowl. Leo was named the High School Football National Champions that year.

=== 1942 ===
- A rodeo was held at Soldier Field in 1942 featuring movie stars Gene Autry and Tex Cooper.
- August 28 101,103 saw the Chicago Bears defeat the College All-Stars 21–0 in the Chicago College All-Star Game. The MVP was Minnesota running back Bruce Smith. Other collegiate participants included Urban Odson
- 120,000 attended the 1942 Catholic Holy Name Society "Holy Hour" service.
- In 1942 the Chicago Opera Company performed both a concert and a performance of Carmen for servicemen. The shows attracted 32,000 spectators.
- September 2–12 a total of 789,915 spectators attended performances of an army war show.
- 75,000 saw Leo defeat Tilden 27–14 in the 1942 Prep Bowl.
- December 5 Notre Dame played Great Lakes in a 13–13 tie.

=== 1943 ===
- A rodeo was held at Soldier Field in 1943.
- September 16: a war bond show was held at Soldier Field as part of the national effort to sell war bonds. Performers included Judy Garland, Lucille Ball, Fred Astaire. Harpo Marx, James Cagney, as well as the Great Lakes Naval Training Station' band and choir. The show raised approximately $200 million. Bond shows were also held in 1944 and 1945.
- 80,000 people saw St. George defeat Phillips 19–12 in the 1943 Prep Bowl.

=== 1944 ===
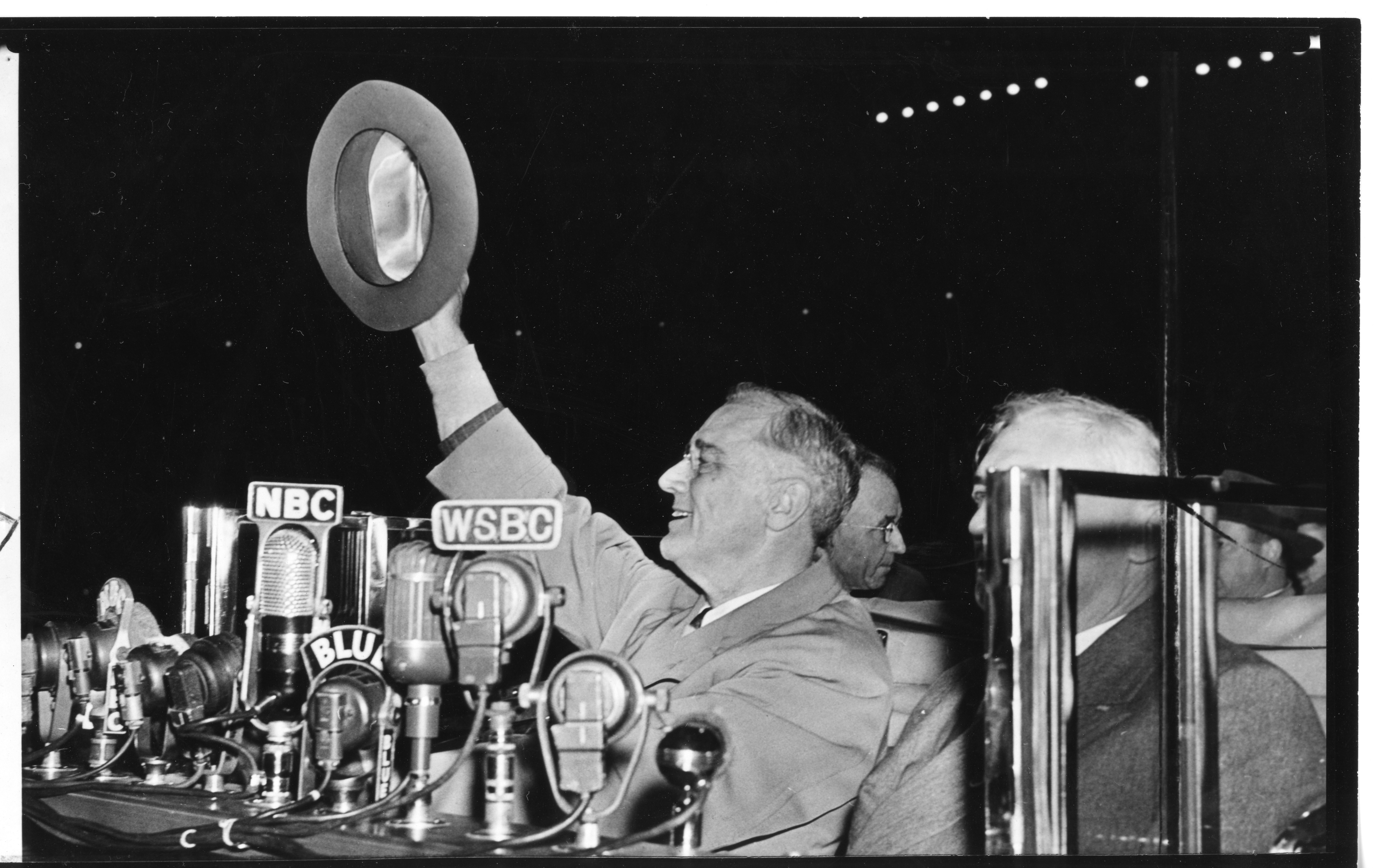
President Franklin D. Roosevelt speaking at Soldier Field

- In June 50,000 spectators attended a national Sokol slet held at Soldier Field.
- June 16 Orson Welles hosted a radio show at Soldier Field to benefit the Fifth War Loan Drive.
- In September 1944 the Ringling Brothers Circus performed a 14-day engagement. These were amongst the Circus' first shows after the Hartford Circus Fire in July 1944 (which had resulted in over 165 deaths and 700 injuries). Due to the fire, the performances at Soldier Field were performed in the open-air, rather than under a big top. The final Sunday attracted 14,000 spectators for the matinee performance and 8,000 for the night performance. On Labor Day 9,000 attended the afternoon performance. The Circus' final performance (which occurred on a Monday night) was attended by 4,500. Excluding additional numbers that attended a 'Bond Night', the Circus attracted 145,000 despite unfavorable weather that occurred most of the opening week.
- October 28 President of the United States Franklin D. Roosevelt made an appearance at Soldier Field, which was the only Midwestern speaking appearance he made in his last reelection campaign. This appearance was attended by over 150,000 (with at least as many people attempting to attend that were unable to gain admission).
- Tilden defeated Weber 13–7 in the 1944 Prep Bowl.

=== 1945 ===
- May 20 Soldier Field hosted a war bond show in connection with the fifth annual I am an American Day. The event included the presentation by General Alexander Vandegrift of the Medal of Honor to Nora Witek, whose son Frank Witek had been killed-in-action in Guam, as well as a reenactment of the raising of the U.S. flag on Iwo Jima during the battle of the same name. The flag-raising reenactment at Soldier Field was portrayed in the Academy Award-winning film Flags of Our Fathers. Performers at the show included Humphrey Bogart and Lauren Bacall.
- May 30 (Memorial Day) the Youth for Christ-movement hosted a rally to commemorate its first anniversary. Over 100,000 spectators attended. Participants included Charles Templeton, Torrey Johnson, and US military chaplain Robert P. Evans. The event's primary speaker was the Reverend Percy Crawford.
- 80,000 spectators saw the 1945 Catholic Holy Name Society "Holy Hour" service at Soldier Field.
- July 19 the American Slav Congress hosted an event commemorating 532nd anniversary of the Battle of Grunwald.
- August 30 92,453 saw the Green Bay Packers defeat the College All-Stars 19–7 in the Chicago College All-Star Game. The MVP was Georgia Bulldog Charley Trippi.
- In 1945 the Chicago Bears held their first Armed Forces Game, an exhibition game series for charity that would be played by the Bears at Soldier Field for many years.
- 80,000 people saw Fenwick defeat Tilden 20–6 in the 1945 Prep Bowl.

=== 1946 ===
- April 6 (Army Day): President Harry Truman spoke at Soldier Field. The most important aspect of Truman's speech was that he hinted at the creation of what would later become NATO. In addition to the President, Chicago Mayor Edward J. Kelley and Army Chief of Staff (and future president of the United States) General Dwight D. Eisenhower also spoke. The event also included a military show. The highlight of the military show was a 600 mph fly-by from two jet-powered P-80A fighters.
- May 30 (Memorial Day): the Youth for Christ-movement held a well-attended rally at Soldier Field. Participants included Billy Graham, Charles Templeton, and Torrey Johnson.
- August 23: 97,380 spectators saw the College All-Stars defeat the Los Angeles Rams 16–0 in the Chicago College All-Star Game. The MVP was Michigan running back Elroy Hirsch.
- September 13: 51,962 spectators attended the All-America Football Conference Chicago Rockets' debut game. The Rockets were defeated 20–6 by the Cleveland Browns.
- September 22: more than 100,000 spectators attended a Catholic Holy Hour service celebrating the newly declared sainthood of Chicago's-own Mother Frances Xavier Cabrini. The event was led by Cardinal Samuel Stritch.
- 85,000 people saw Fenger defeat Weber 13–7 in the 1946 Prep Bowl.

=== 1947 ===
- A rodeo competition was held at Soldier Field in July 1947 and was one of the first televised events at Soldier Field. The competition ended with its championship on July 20.
- At the same time as the annual circus engagement, a General Motors car expo was held in Soldier Field's parking lot.
- In 1947 more than 20,000 watched a soccer match between a Chicago all-star team and a team provided by Hapoel. The game ended in a tie.
- August 22 105,840 saw the College All-Stars defeat the Chicago Bears 16–0 in the Chicago College All-Star Game. The MVP was Illinois running back Claude Young.
- Austin defeated Leo 13–12 in the 1947 Prep Bowl.
- In 1947 the Chicago Bears' annual Armed Forces Game was held at Soldier Field for the first time. The Bears' opponent was the Washington Redskins. Chicago won the game 28–0. The Armed Forces Game raised proceeds for the relief funds of the four branches of the US Armed Services, and was held annually from 1943 through 1970 (and was held at the Bears' home stadium, Wrigley Field, for a number of those years).

=== 1948 ===
- August 22 101,220 saw the Chicago Cardinals defeat the College All-Stars 28–0 in the Chicago College All-Star Game. The MVP was Kentucky running back Jay Rodemeyer.
- In 1948 2x Olympic gold medalist swimmer Vicki Draves turned professional when she made her debut in Larry Crosby's "Rhapsody in Swimtime" aquatic show at Soldier Field.
- Lindblom defeated Fenwick 13–7 in the 1948 Prep Bowl.

=== 1949 ===
- April 17: due to cold and snowy weather, only about 35,000 attended the Easter sunrise service at Soldier Field.
- Al Jolson again headlined the Chicagoland Music Festival in 1949, having previously headlined in 1934.
- August 22: 93,780 saw the Philadelphia Eagles defeat the College All-Stars 38–0 in the Chicago College All-Star Game. The MVP was Notre Dame offensive lineman Bill Fischer.
- June 16: speech by President Harry S. Truman
- June 19: President Harry S. Truman spoke at the convention of the Ancient Arabic Order of Nobles of the Mystic Shrine (Shriners) marking the group's 75th anniversary. This event was one of the first at Soldier Field to be televised. The event featured one of the largest parades in Chicago's history. The parade preceding the event at Soldier Field featured over 15,000 Shriners from 1,000 American and Canadian chapters of the group and 130 bands. The parade covered three miles and lasted five-hours. The parade was seen by approximately 500,000 spectators. Hollywood legend Harold Lloyd walked in the parade, and at the end of the convention held at Soldier Field he was named "Imperial Potentate", the national leader of the group.
- October 28: 11,249 spectators saw the Chicago Hornets, who were formerly known as the Chicago Rockets, lose 14–24 to the Los Angeles Dons in what would ultimately be the Hornets' final last-ever home game
- Schurz defeated Fenwick 20–7 in the 1949 Prep Bowl.

== 1950s ==
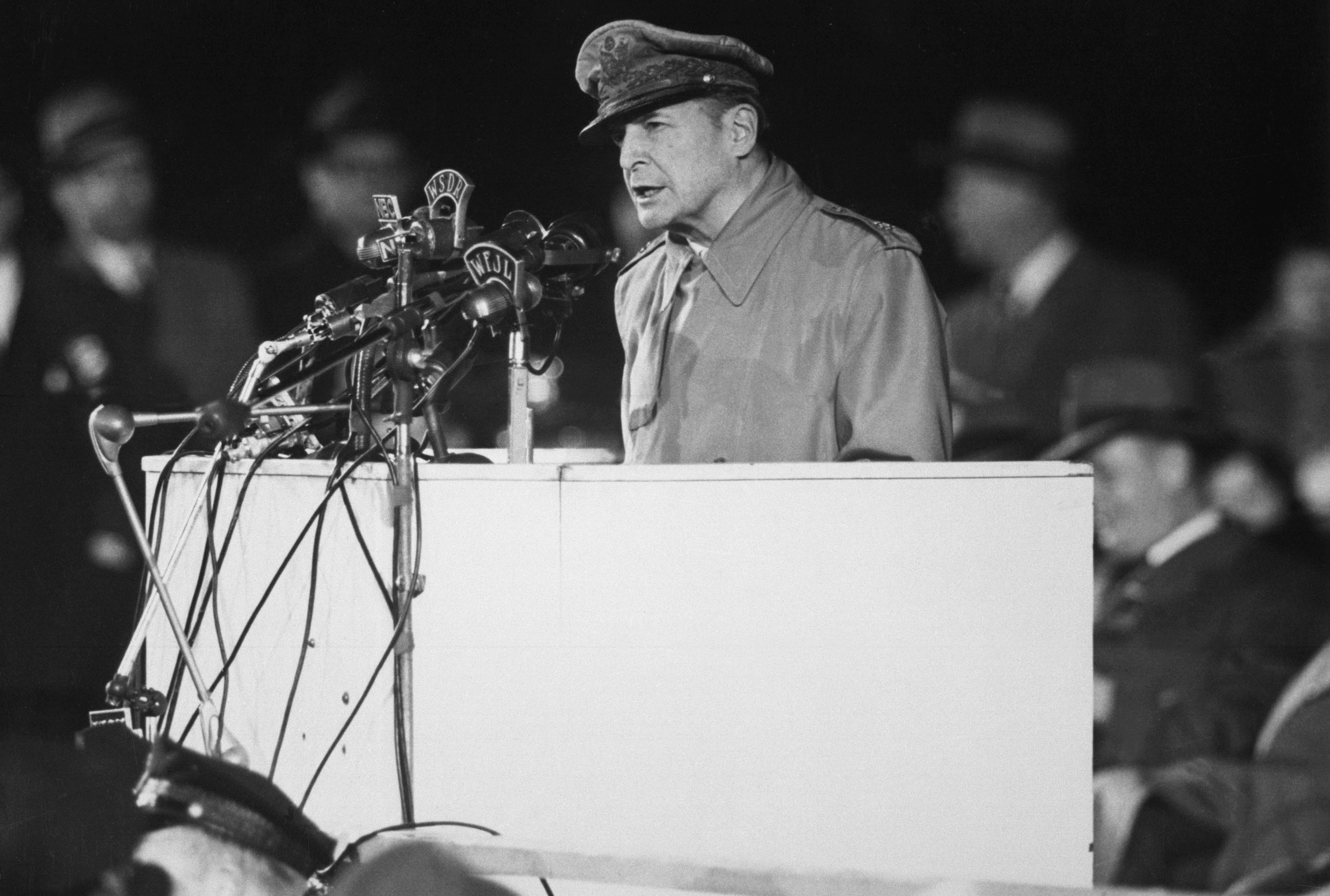
Gen. Douglas MacArthur addressing an audience of 50,000

=== 1950 ===
- August 11: 88,885 saw the College All-Stars defeat the Philadelphia Eagles 17–7 in the Chicago College All-Star Game. The MVP was North Carolina running back Charlie Justice.
- 70,000 spectators attended the 1950 Chicagoland Music Festival. Among the performers was Alec Templeton.
- Mount Carmel, coached by Terry Brennan, defeated Lane Tech 45–20 in the 1950 Prep Bowl.

=== 1951 ===
- April 26: US General during World War II Douglas MacArthur addressed a crowd of 50,000 at Soldier Field during his first visit to the United States in 14 years.
- August 17 92,180 saw the Cleveland Browns defeat the College All-Stars 33–0 in the Chicago College All-Star Game. The MVP was Texas Longhorn Lewis McFadin.
- Mount Carmel, coached by Terry Brennan, defeated Lindblom 19–6 in the 1951 Prep Bowl.

=== 1952 ===
- August 15 88,316 saw the Los Angeles Rams defeat the College All-Stars 10–7 in the Chicago College All-Star Game. The MVP was Kentucky quarterback Babe Parilli.
- Mount Carmel, coached by Terry Brennan, defeated Austin 27–19 in the 1952 Prep Bowl.

=== 1953 ===
- August 14 93,818 saw the Detroit Lions defeat the College All-Stars 24–10 in the Chicago College All-Star Game. The MVP was Texas Longhorn Gib Dawson
- St. George defeated Austin 38–12 in the 1953 Prep Bowl.

=== 1954 ===
- May 8 a crowd of 13,000 watched the West German association football team Dortmund Borussia beat the English team Plymouth Argyle 4-0.
- May 16 the Chicago Park District's Police Benevolent Association sponsored its 9th annual Golf Trophy race at Soldier Field. More than 30,000 tickets were sold.
- August 13 93,470 saw the Detroit Lions defeat the College All-Stars 31–6 in the Chicago College All-Star Game. The MVP was Texas defensive end Carlton Massey.
- August 15 over 125,000 attended as the World Council of Churches held the Ecumenical Festival of Faith, which served as the opening ceremony for two-weeks of meetings that the World Council held in Chicago and Evanston (and even included a speech by President Eisenhower). The ceremony featured a cast of 4,000 and was arranged by Helen Kromer. Henry P. Van Dusen, president of the New York Union Theological Seminary, proclaimed the event to have been "the most widely representative, most truly 'ecumenical' assemblage of the followers of Christ who have ever met 'in one accord in one place.'" Delegates attended even from four nations located behind the "Iron Curtain" (Czechoslovakia, East Germany, Hungary, and Yugoslavia). The ceremony was opened with a speech by Chicago mayor Martin Kennelly.
  - Hours prior to the ceremony, Soldier Field's convention halls hosted a 1,600-person banquet for delegates.
- August 21 Liberace headlined the 25th annual Chicagoland Music Festival. Jack Webb appeared at the event to promote the Chicago Theatre premiere of the film Dragnet.
- September 8 what many regard to have been Soldier Field's largest crowd ever, 260,000 spectators, attended the Marian Year tribute of the Roman Catholic Archdiocese of Chicago. 180,000 were inside of the stadium, while another 80,000 gathered outside of the stadium and listened via loudspeakers. The event was led by Cardinal Samuel Stritch.
- 54,000 spectators saw Fenger defeated Mount Carmel 20–13 in the 1954 Prep Bowl.
- In 1954 an international ski jumping championship was held at Soldier Field by the Norge Ski Club.

=== 1955 ===
- July 13 former president of the United States Harry S. Truman again spoke at another Shriners convention held at Soldier Field. The event was dubbed "Shrinerama" and was attended by more than 58,000 spectators. In addition to a speech from Truman, other notable facets of the event include a band of 1,500 Shriner musicians, a performance from a 1,000-voice choir, circus acts, military drills, and a mock rematch between Jack Dempsey and Gene Tunney (who had both famously faced-off for the heavyweight title at Soldier Field in the 1927 Long Count Fight). The event concluded with a fireworks display.
- August 12 75,000 saw the College All-Stars defeat the Cleveland Browns 30–27 in the Chicago College All-Star Game. The MVP was Notre Dame quarterback Ralph Guglielmi.
- In 1955 the Ringling Brothers Barnum and Bailey Circus visited Soldier Field's parking lot. This was the final time it would visit Soldier Field.
- Chicago Vocational defeated Weber 6–0 in the 1955 Prep Bowl.

=== 1956 ===
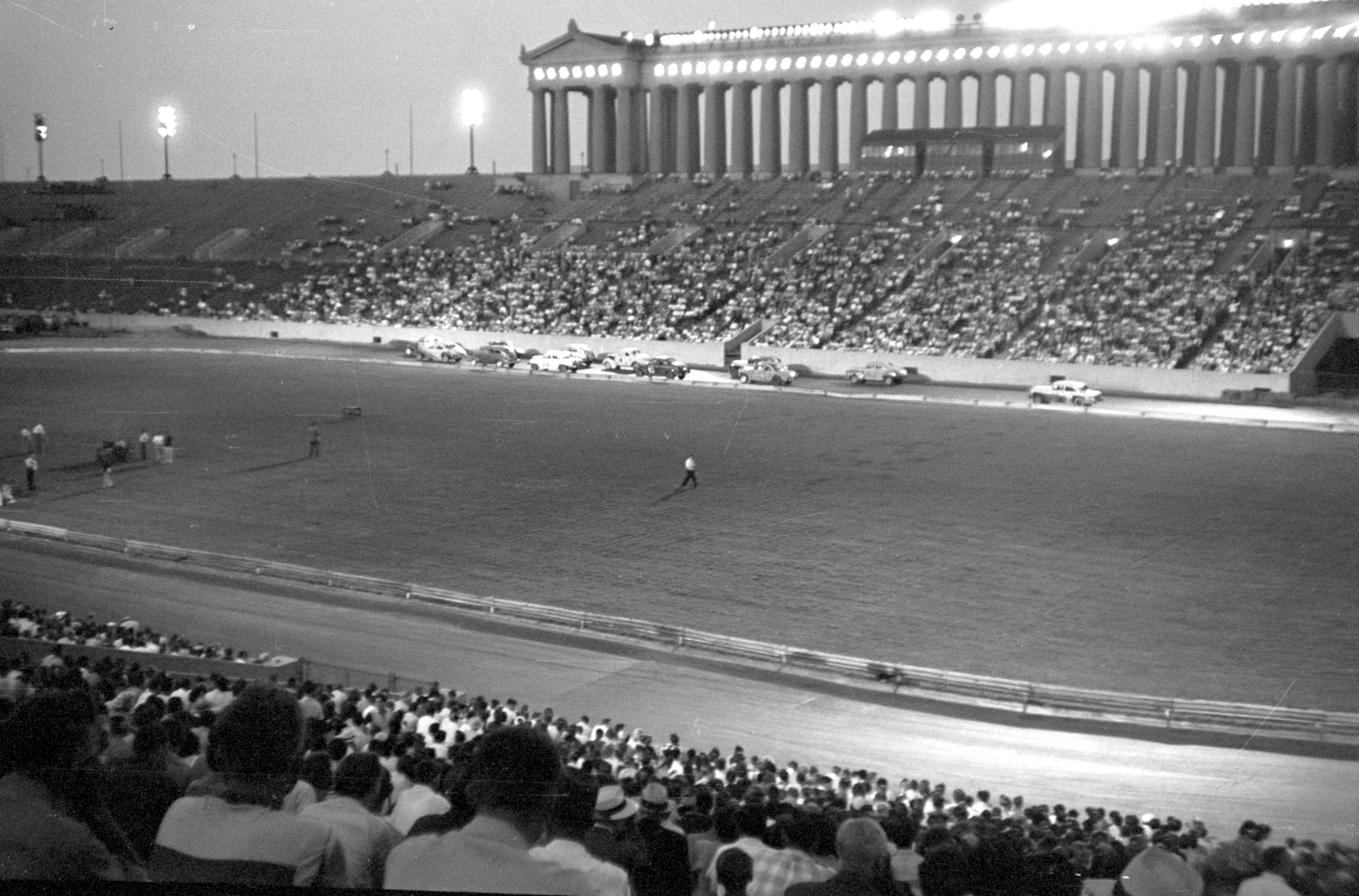
Soldier Field while hosting an automobile race in 1956

- August 10: Chicago College All-Star Game, in which 75,000 saw the Cleveland Browns defeat the College All-Stars 26–0.
- 1956 Chicagoland Music Festival featured 8,000 performers, including Al G. Wright, Richard Tucker, the Skokie American Indians drum and bugle corps (the national champions). Special guests at the included Richard Rodgers and Oscar Hammerstein. A men's and a women's singing contest were held at the event, the winners performing on the Ed Sullivan Show the following night. The competition was judged by Rosa Raisa, Sonia Sharnova, and Louis Sudler. This was the final edition of the original run of the Chicagoland Music Festival.
- July 21: Glenn "Fireball" Roberts won the only NASCAR Grand National Series (today's NASCAR Cup Series) race held at the stadium's short track which ran across the old configuration. Roberts beat Jim Pascal but only a car's-length. Roberts passed Pascal only in the 194th lap out of 200 laps total. The order that drivers came in following Roberts then Pascal was Ralph Moody, Speedy Thompson, Frank Mundy, Buck Baker, Bill Champion, Paul Goldsmith, Joy Fair, Lee Petty, Bob Esposito, Frank Edwards, Bill Massey, Chuck Mesler, Al Watkins, Sal Tovella, Billy Myers, Herb Thomas, Darvin Randahl, Fred Lorenzen, Bob Chaunce, Tom Pistone, Bill Vesler, Kenny Paulsen, Ray Crowley.
- Two NASCAR Convertible Division races were held at Soldier Field in 1956.
  - In 1956, 38,000 saw Tom Pistone win the NASCAR Soldier Field 100. Pistone ultimately won a record 38 motor race events at Soldier Field.
- Leo defeated Calumet 12–0 in the 1956 Prep Bowl. Jim Arneberg, who was a star lineman for the 1941 and 1942 Leo teams coached the Leo Lions in this Prep Bowl, becoming the first person to both play and coach in the Prep Bowl.

=== 1957 ===
- June 15: Soldier Field hosted a 50-lap race under the NASCAR "Grand National" banner. While considered to be a NASCAR Grand National event at the time it was held, the event does not currently appear on NASCAR's lists of Grand National events held that year. The event was won by Bill Brown
- June 29: Soldier Field hosted a 100-lap NASCAR event, which was won by Glen Wood.
- August 9 :75,000 saw the New York Giants defeat the College All-Stars 22–12 in the Chicago College All-Star Game. The MVP was Stanford quarterback John Brodie.
- Mendel defeated Calumet 6–0 in the 1957 Prep Bowl, scoring the game's only points with a Hail Mary pass in the final play.
- In 1957 NASCAR held a Convertible Division event at Soldier Field, which was won by Glenn Wood. This was the final NASCAR event held at Soldier Field.

=== 1958 ===
- August 14 70,000 saw the College All-Stars defeat the Detroit Lions 35–19 in the Chicago College All-Star Game. The MVPs were Illinois halfback/wide receiver Bobby Mitchell and Michigan State quarterback Jim Ninowski.
- In the summer of 1958, the Christiana Brothers Circus visited Soldier Field's parking lot for 17 performance dates.
- Austin defeated Fenwick 20–7 in the 1958 Prep Bowl.

=== 1959 ===
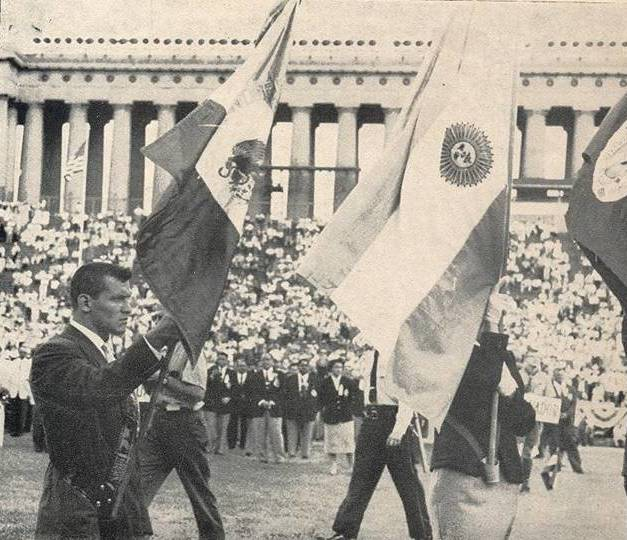
Opening ceremonies of the 1959 Pan American Games. Wrestler Mario Tovar González can be seen serving as Mexico's flag bearer.

- August 14 70,000 saw the Baltimore Colts defeat the College All-Stars 29–0 in the Chicago College All-Star Game. The MVP was Michigan running back Bob Ptacek.
- August 27 Soldier Field hosted the opening ceremonies of the 1959 Pan American Games. The opening was held in sunny 90 °F (32 °C) heat, and was attended by 40,000 spectators.
- Soldier Field hosted the athletics component of the 1959 Pan American Games. Notable competitors included the US' Greg Bell, Don Bragg, Earlene Brown, Lee Calhoun, Lester Carney, Dick Cochran, Hal Connolly, Josh Culbreath, Clifton Cushman, Isabelle Daniels, Bill Dellinger, Charles Dumas, Jim Grelle, Barbara Jones, Hayes Jones, Dallas Long, Margaret Matthews, Parry O'Brien, Al Oerter, Bo Roberson, Wilma Rudolph, Bill Sharpe, Lucia Williams, Dyrol Burleson, Al Cantello, Phil Coleman, Dave Edstrom, Phil Mulkey, Tom Murphy, Ray Norton, Bob Backus, Ann Marie Flynn, Albert Hall and Max Truex; Puerto Rico's Rolando Cruz; Trinidad and Tobago's Clifton Bertrand and Mike Agostini; Chile's Marlene Ahrens; Cuba's Enrique Figuerola and Bertha Díaz; Jamaica's George Kerr, Malcolm Spence, Mel Spence and Dennis Johnson; Canada's Doug Kyle, Sally McCallum, George Stulac and Alice Whitty; Brazil's Adhemar da Silva and Wanda dos Santos; Argentina's Osvaldo Suárez; Mexico's Alfredo Tinoco. Also among the athletes competing was future prime minister of Antigua and Barbuda Lester Bird.
- September 7 Soldier Field hosted the closing ceremonies of the 1959 Pan American Games.
- November 29 the Cardinals played their last home game as the Chicago Cardinals. The following season they moved to St. Louis (and later would leave St. Louis for Arizona).
- Lane Tech defeated Fenwick 19–0 in the 1959 Prep Bowl.

== 1960s ==
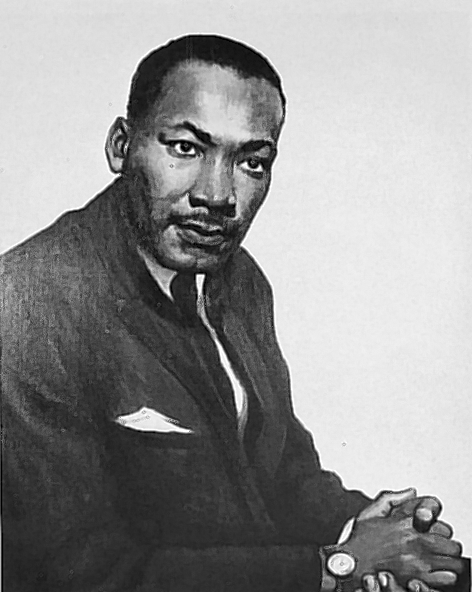
Martin Luther King Jr. led two Chicago Freedom Movement rallies at Soldier Field.

=== 1960 ===
- August 12 70,000 saw the Baltimore Colts defeat the College All-Stars 32–7 in the Chicago College All-Star Game. The MVP was Cincinnati Bearcats end Jim Leo.
- Soldier Field hosted the 1960 Western Golden Gloves. Muhammad Ali fought in this event, and received the Outstanding Fighter trophy for his weight class.
- 93,000 spectators attended two performances of the Police show, headlined by Jack Paar. Other performers included Wimpy the Clown, an acrobat named Bettina, and Trans-World Airdevils auto stunts. Stanley R. Sarbaneck, president of the benevolent association, spoke at the event.
- Mount Carmel, coached by Tom Carey (the older brother of their quarterback Tony), defeated Taft 27–8 in the 1960 Prep Bowl. Tom Carey became one of the first individuals to both play and coach in a Prep Bowl, having won it as a quarterback exactly ten years earlier.

=== 1961 ===
- July 28 18,000 spectators attended double-header soccer matches at Soldier Field. The first match was between a Chicago all-star team and the US national amateur champion Saint Louis Kutis. The Chicago all-stars won with a surprising score of 6–0. This game was followed by a benefit game for March of Dimes pinning Vienna's Rapid team against the Español of Barcelona. Vienna won 5–4.
- August 4 66,000 saw the Philadelphia Eagles defeat the College All-Stars 28–14 in the Chicago College All-Star Game. The MVP was UCLA quarterback Billy Kilmer.
- 83,750 people saw Weber defeat Lane Tech 14–12 in the 1961 Prep Bowl. Weber defeated Lane Tech after a muffed punt snap in the last minute after Lane fumbled the ball far in its own territory with only minutes remaining.

=== 1962 ===
- June 17 116,000 spectators attended a Billy Graham crusade at Soldier Field. This event followed nineteen days of crusades that Graham had held at the nearby McCormick Place convention center. Those events averaged 37,000 spectators a day (the opening speech alone was attended by 33,000).
- The America FC of Rio de Janeiro defeated the Palmero of Italy 3–2 in a match held at Soldier Field. This was one of several International Soccer League matches that were held at Soldier Field in 1962, which altogether attracted a total of 50,000 spectators.
- August 3 65,000 saw the Green Bay Packers defeat the College All-Stars 42–20 in the Chicago College All-Star Game. The MVP was Kansas quarterback John Hadl.
- 91,328 people saw Fenwick defeat Schurz 40–0 in the 1962 Prep Bowl. This ended a 10–0 season for the Fenwick Friars (in which they outscored their opponents 317–32). In the Prep Bowl game, Fenwick's Jim DiLullo ran for 224 yards and scored five touchdowns on just 12 carries. This was the third most-attended Prep Bowl to date.

=== 1963 ===
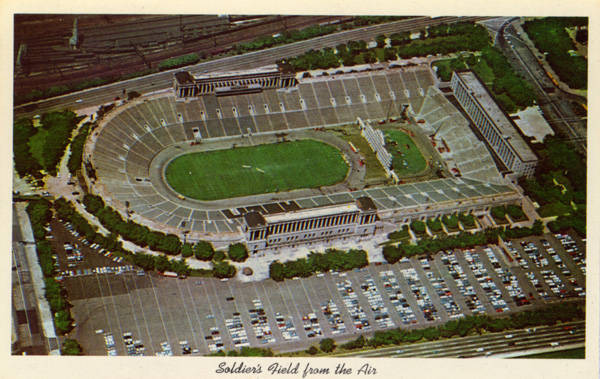
Soldier Field in 1968

- In 1963 nine International Soccer League matches were held at Soldier Field. This included the first game of a two-game championship series.
- August 2 65,000 saw the College All-Stars defeat the Green Bay Packers 20–17 in the Chicago College All-Star Game. The MVP was Wisconsin quarterback Ron Vander Kelen. This was the final game in which the All-Stars beat their NFL competitors.
- August 17 Lawrence Weller headlined the 34th annual Chicagoland Music Festival. Bob Bell performed as Bozo the Clown alongside other Bozo's Circus cast members at the beginning of the Festival.
- November 2 Soldier Field hosted the Army–Air Force game. It was the first game between two military colleges at Soldier Field since the 1927 Army–Navy Game. President of the United States John F. Kennedy was scheduled to make an appearance at halftime as part of his reelection campaign. Kennedy had worked with Chicago Mayor Richard J. Daley in attracting the game to Chicago.
- 81,270 saw St. Rita defeat Chicago Vocational 42–7 in the 1963 Prep Bowl. The St. Rita squad was named the High School Football National Champions that year. Mendel halfback John Byrne scored five touchdowns and six extra points.

=== 1964 ===
- Three International Soccer League games were held at Soldier Field in 1964.
- An invitational soccer tournament was held at Soldier Field. The tournament was promoted by local amateur teams, and also featured three international matches. The event culminated in a team from Liverpool winning the Governor Otto Kerner Trophy.
- June 21 75,000 attended a Chicago Freedom Movement rally featuring the Reverends Martin Luther King Jr. and Theodore Hesburgh (president of Notre Dame University). The Master of Ceremonies of the event was the Archbishop Arthur M. Brazier. The event's directors were Edgar Chandler and Edwin C. Berry.
- August 7 65,000 saw the Chicago Bears defeat the College All-Stars 28–17 in the Chicago College All-Star Game. The MVP was Arizona State guard Chuck Taylor.
- August 15 Johnny Cash and June Carter headlined the Chicagoland Music Festival.
- November 22 Soldier Field hosted the 52nd Annual Catholic League Championship between Weber and Mount Carmel.
- Weber defeated Chicago Vocational 34–13 in the 1964 Prep Bowl. Critical to the success of Weber's 1964 season and Prep Bowl victory was defensive back Rich "Chico" Kurzawski.

=== 1965 ===
- August 6: 68,000 saw the Cleveland Browns defeat the College All-Stars 24–16 in the Chicago College All-Star Game. The MVP was Notre Dame quarterback John Huarte.
- A crowd of 10,000 (including 7,000 UIC Students) saw the UIC Chikas defeat the Milwaukee Panthers 20-6 in their homecoming game at Soldier Field. The game was preceded by a parade from the University's new campus (near the Circle Interchange) to Soldier Field. The teams' homecoming festivities also included a concert at the Medinah Temple attended by over 1,000 students the night prior to the game, and a post-game dance which entertainment by such acts as The Cryan' Shames and Josh White.
- November 6: Army–Air Force game.
- 75,400 saw Loyola Academy defeat Chicago Vocational 33–13 in the 1965 Prep Bowl. By the time of the preceding Chicago Catholic League championship game Loyola was down to their thirdstring QB (Ken Krakovich) and a sophomore running back (Jack Spellman) due to injuries of QB Tim Foley and AllState running back Randy Marks, but Loyola nonetheless won both the Catholic League championship and Prep Bowl under those circumstances.

=== 1966 ===
- A number of international soccer matches were played at Soldier Field in 1966, including many exhibition matches featuring touring teams.
- July 10 the Chicago Freedom Movement, led by Martin Luther King Jr., held a rally at Soldier Field. As many as 64,000 people came to hear Dr. King, James Meredith, Floyd B. McKissick, Albert Raby Joseph H. Jackson, Edwin C. Berry as well as Mahalia Jackson, Stevie Wonder and Peter, Paul and Mary. Auxiliary Bishop Aloysius Wycislo read a statement from Archbishop John Cody.
- July 23 Mike McGreevy won the last USAC midget feature race held at Soldier Field.
- A 5-day rodeo competition was the final such event held at Soldier Field. Among the animals entered was a prized bull named Lippy Leo, owned by Chicago Cubs manager Leo Durocher.
- A 1966 pageant celebrating 1,000 years of Christianity in Poland was the last large pageant to be held at Soldier Field.
- August 5 72,000 saw the Green Bay Packers defeat the College All-Stars 38–0 in the Chicago College All-Star Game. The MVP was Missouri quarterback Gary Lane.
- August 9: Barbra Streisand concert
- Loyola Academy defeated Chicago Vocational 20–14 in the 1966 Prep Bowl.

=== 1967 ===
- April 16: about 5,000 spectators watched the Chicago Spurs of the National Professional Soccer League play their first game. They defeated Saint Louis 2–1. Native Chicagoan Willie Roy scored both goals for the Spurs.
- August 4: 70,934 saw the Green Bay Packers defeat the College All-Stars 27–0 in the Chicago College All-Star Game. The MVP was Michigan States defensive end Charles Smith.
- September 10: Mixed Breed Dog Show, a tongue-in-cheek event organized by Mike Royko.
- In 1967 Soldier Field hosted the Chicago Park District's Mum Bowl, the championship for its football teams.
- Mount Carmel defeated Dunbar 37–0 in the 1967 Prep Bowl. This was the final year of Frank Maloney's tenure as Mount Carmel's coach. He began his collegiate coaching career thereafter.

=== 1968 ===
- July 4 musician Al Morgan, WGN-AM's Ray Leonard, WCIU-TV's Ted Weber, and others participated in the annual American Legion show.
- June 7 Sal Tovella won what was the last stock car race held at Soldier Field, thus marking the end of an era.
- July 19-August 3 the first edition of the Special Olympics Summer World Games were held at Soldier Field in Chicago. The games spanned two days and more than 1,000 kids ages 8–18 with intellectual disabilities from 26 U.S. states and from Canada competed. The competition included athletics, four different difficulty-level aquatics (a pool was erected on Soldier Field's arena floor especially for these events), figure skating (an ice sheet was erected within the halls of Soldier Field), basketball (nets were erected in the stadium), and floor hockey. The event began a worldwide Special Olympics movement that thrives to this day. Mayor Richard J. Daley of Chicago was involved in the administration of the event, as well as the ceremonies, along with Special Olympics co-founders Eunice Kennedy Shriver and Anne M. Burke and others including Dr. Frank J. Hayden of the Joseph P. Kennedy Jr. Foundation, statesman Sargent Shriver, Olympic gold medalist decathlete Rafer Johnson.
- August 2 69,917 saw the Green Bay Packers defeat the College All-Stars 34–17 in the Chicago College All-Star Game. The MVP was Syracuse running back Larry Csonka. Other collegiate participants included Forrest Blue.
- August 27 a Democratic Party rally was scheduled to be held at Soldier Field. The Democratic Party had rented out Soldier Field for the entire week of the 1968 Democratic National Convention held at the International Amphitheatre in Chicago. Despite deciding against seeking reelection, incumbent President Lyndon B. Johnson had planned on attended the rally, which would have doubled as a birthday party for him. Instead, due to riots surrounding the convention, all regular Democratic Party rallies were cancelled, and the President did not leave the White House to attend the convention.
- Mendel defeated Chicago Vocational 41–19 in the 1968 Prep Bowl.

=== 1969 ===
- August 1: 74,208 saw the New York Jets defeat the College All-Stars 26–24 in the Chicago College All-Star Game. The MVP was Cincinnati quarterback Greg Cook.
- In 1969, Soldier Field hosted the inaugural edition of the annual Special Olympics Chicago. The Special Olympics Chicago have been held with Soldier Field as its main venue since, with the exception of 2002.
- Loyola Academy defeated Lane Tech 26–0 in the 1969 Prep Bowl.

== 1970s ==
=== 1970 ===
- In June Soldier Field hosted an association football match between Poland and Portugal. All fans had to sit in the west stands, due to repairs taking place on the eastern stands.
- July 4 Soldier Field's final auto racing event took place, with drag races being organized during the American Legion's annual Independence Day celebrations.
- July 18 Soldier Field hosted WCFL's Big Ten Summer Music Festival. The event featured Chicago, Illinois Speed Press, The Illusion, It Doesn't Matter, Happy Day, Pig Iron, The Stooges, Dreams, Leon Russell, MC5, Funkadelic, Joe Kelley Blues Band, Mason Proffit, Bloomsbury People, Bush, and Iggy Pop amongst others. The event began at dawn with a fireworks display.
- The final fire show at Soldier Field occurred as a part of a lakefront festival that also included the Chicago Air and Water Show. 38,000 spectators were in attendance, including Mayor Richard J. Daley and Fire Commissioner Robert Quinn.
- July 31 69,940 saw the Kansas City Chiefs defeat the College All-Stars 24–3 in the Chicago College All-Star Game. The MVP was Boston University defensive back Bruce Taylor.
- Soldier Field was the main venue of the II Special Olympics World Games held August 13–15, 1970.
- Soldier Field hosted the Special Olympics Chicago.
- St. Rita defeated Lane Tech 12–8 in the 1970 Prep Bowl. Members of the St. Rita team included Billy Marek and Dennis Lick. The team was coached by Pat Cronin.

=== 1971 ===
- July 30 52,289 saw the Baltimore Colts defeat the College All-Stars 24–17 in the Chicago College All-Star Game. The MVP was Grambling State Defensive end Richard Harris.
- September 12 the Chicago Bears faced the Denver Broncos in their first preseason home game as tenants of Soldier Field.
- September 19 55,701 spectators saw the Chicago Bears defeat the Pittsburgh Steelers 17-15 in their first regular-season game as tenants at Soldier Field.
- St. Rita defeated Morgan Park 18–12 in the 1971 Prep Bowl. Members of the St. Rita team included Billy Marek and Dennis Lick. The team was coached by Pat Cronin.

=== 1972 ===
- July 28 54,162 saw the Dallas Cowboys defeat the College All-Stars 20–7 in the Chicago College All-Star Game. The MVP was Auburn quarterback Pat Sullivan.
- July 4 50,000 spectators attended the annual American Legion show.
- Tennessee State defeated Alcorn 40-13 in Soldier Field's annual football game between historically black colleges.
- St. Laurence defeated Taft 24–7 in the 1972 Prep Bowl.

=== 1973 ===
- July 23 54,103 saw the Miami Dolphins defeat the College All-Stars 14–3 in the Chicago College All-Star Game. The MVP was Southern Mississippi punter Ray Guy.
- St. Laurence defeated Phillips 40-24 in the 1973 Prep Bowl.
- Amateur Boxing U.S.A. versus Ireland Sept. 28th

=== 1974 ===
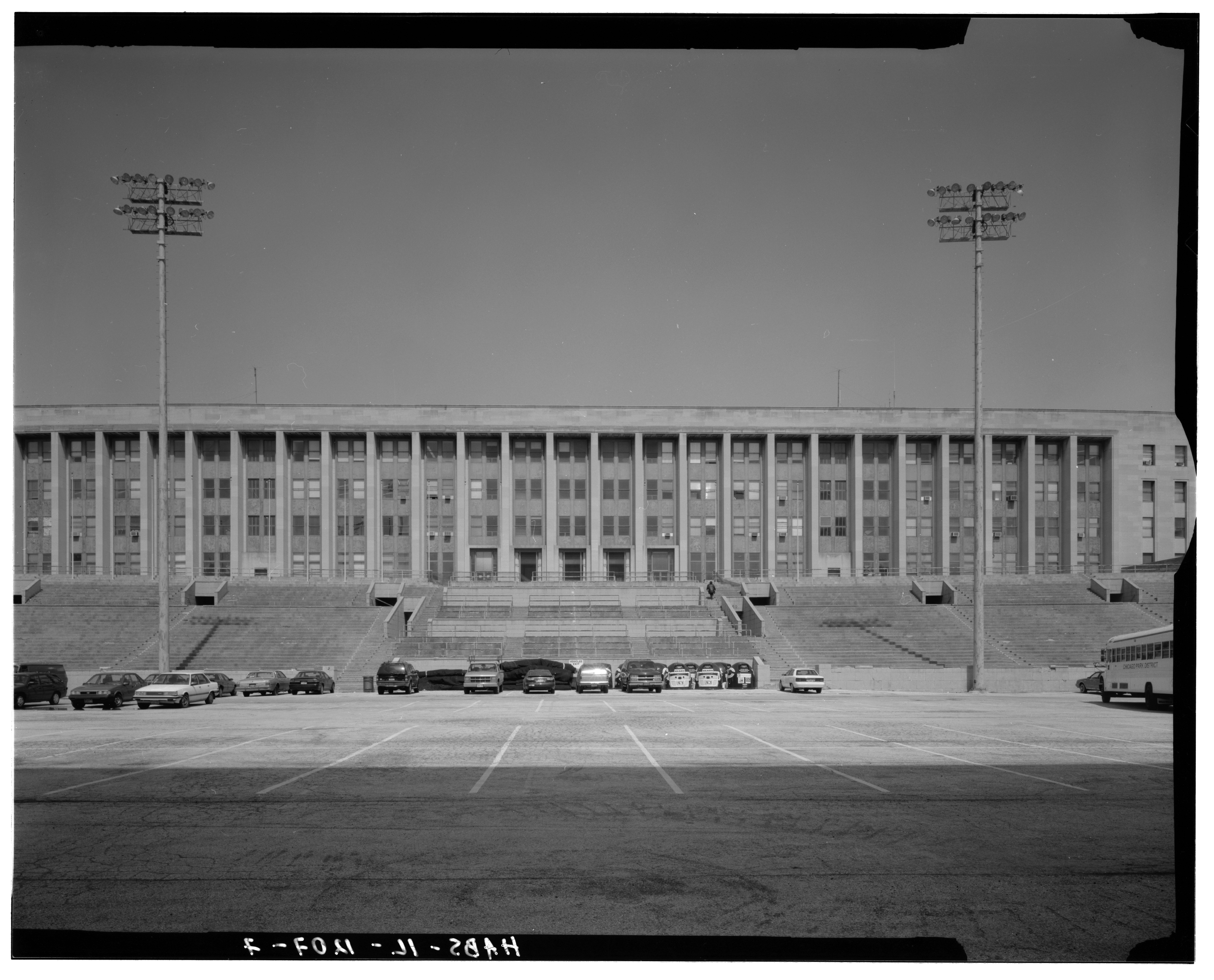
The North End of Soldier Field, which held such events as the "International Festival of Tennis" over the years

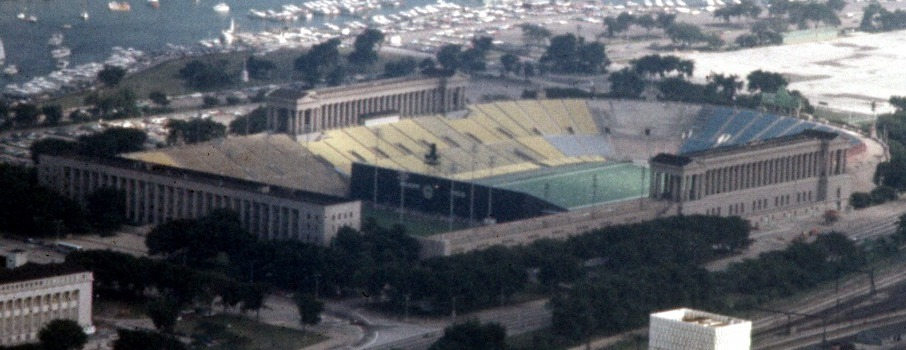
Soldier Field in 1974

- July 10 42,000 attended the inaugural game of the World Football League's Chicago Fire.
- In 1974 the North End of Soldier Field (the end that was cut off from the main stadium by the northern end zone seats installed during the renovations completed following the arrival of the Chicago Bears) hosted the 1974 International Festival of Tennis. Notable-figures that competed in the tournament include, among others, Lloyd Bridges, Raúl Ramírez, Grant Golden, Stan Smith, Marty Riessen, Roscoe Tanner, Billy Martin. Bud Collins called the mini-stadium at the north end of Soldier Field the best venue in the nation for events such as the Davis Cup to be held in the future. Grant Golden lauded the venue saying "This stadium at the north end of Soldier Field is the best in the world, and I've played 'em all," and added "We can seat 20,000 and there isn't a bad seat in the house." Additionally, national reporters named Soldier Field's courts as the best in the country. The attendance was not as high as expected, with only 20,000 people attending the nearly week-long tournament, but the event was declared a success in many other respects. Over 4,400 spectators attended the final, in which Stan Smith defeated Marty Riessen. Among those spectators that attended events during tournament were Butch Buchholz, Janet Young, Kim Warwick, Graham Stilwell, and Sue Eastman.
- September 13 Soldier Field, for the fifth year, held its annual collegiate football game between historically black colleges. The game was played between Tennessee State and Central State. Proceeds benefited charities relating to sickle cell anemia.
- St. Laurence defeated Chicago Vocational 34–0 in the 1974 Prep Bowl.

=== 1975 ===
- In 1975 the North Field of Soldier Field again held the International Festival of Tennis. Amongst the participants were Billy Martin and Roscoe Tanner (who won the tournament with a $9,000 purse). The attendance was even less than the previous year. Only 2,000 people attending the quarter finals (while at the same time 5,000 spectators watched a Chicago Sting game that was taking place in the South End of Soldier Field).
- The Chicago Winds of the World Football League played their only season at Soldier Field in 1975. Their only win was attended by a mere 3,502 spectators at Soldier Field, with them defeating the Portland Thunder
- The Emmet Kelly Jr. Circus, organized by Chicago Park District superintendent Edmund Kelly, performed in Soldier Field's north end for several nights beginning on June 14. Its headlining performer was Emmet Kelly Jr. playing the circus clown made famous by Emmet Kelly Sr., Wearie Willie.
- 1975 Marvin Gaye concert in the northern arena of Soldier Field.
- August 1 54,562 saw the Pittsburgh Steelers defeat the College All-Stars 21–14 in the Chicago College All-Star Game.
- Brother Rice defeated Chicago Vocational 26–0 in the 1975 Prep Bowl.

=== 1976 ===
- July 23 52,095 saw the Pittsburgh Steelers play the Chicago All-Stars in what would be the final Chicago College All-Star Game. The game was called late with 1:22 left in the third quarter due to heavy rain. Despite featuring stars such as Chuck Muncie, Mike Pruitt, Lee Roy Selmon, and Jackie Slater, the all-stars were hopelessly outmatched by the Pittsburgh Steelers, winners of Super Bowl X. The star quarterback for the College All-Stars was Steeler draft pick Mike Kruczek, out of Boston College. Late in the third quarter, with the Steelers leading 24–0, high winds prompted all-star coach Ara Parseghian to call time out. Fans began pouring out onto the field and sliding on the turf. With the rain getting harder, the officials ordered both teams to their locker rooms. All attempts to clear the field failed; the fans even tore down the goalposts. However, by this time the rain had become so heavy as to make the field unplayable even if order had been restored. Finally, at 11:01 pm NFL Commissioner Pete Rozelle and the Tribune announced that the game had been called. The news was greeted with jeers, and numerous brawls broke out on the flooded field before order was finally restored. Joe Washington of Oklahoma was selected MVP of this final College All-Star game. Chicago Tribune Charities had every intention of staging a 1977 game. However, with coaches increasingly unwilling to let their high draft picks play and insurance costs on the rise due to higher player salaries, the Tribune announced on December 21, 1976, that the game would be discontinued. Serving as the coach of the All-Stars was also the final coaching experience of Ara Parseghian.
- July 25 ZZ Top concert
- The Chicago Sting ended their 1976 postseason at Soldier Field, with a double-overtime loss to Toronto. Toronto would subsequently win the league's championship that season.
- Chicago Vocational defeated St. Rita 13–6 in the 1976 Prep Bowl.

=== 1977 ===
- June 4: 80,000 people attended as Soldier Field held the Super Bowl of Rock concert featuring Emerson, Lake & Palmer, Foghat, the J. Geils Band and the Climax Blues Band.
- June 19: 95,000 spectators attended a Pink Floyd 'Animals' tour concert.
- July 9: 77,197 spectators attended a Lynyrd Skynyrd and Point Blank concert.
- July 10 :Super Bowl of Rock Game 3 concert featuring Ted Nugent, Lynyrd Skynyrd, REO Speedwagon, Journey and .38 Special.
- August 13: Peter Frampton concert, with Bob Seger & The Silver Bullet Band, Rick Derringer and UFO.
- In 1977 Pelé made his final Soldier Field appearance in a Chicago Sting match against the New York Cosmos.
- St. Rita defeated Lane Tech 20–8 in the 1977 Prep Bowl.
- November 20, despite playing with flu symptoms, Bears running back Walter Payton managed to rush for 275 yards in forty carries, beating a single-game record that O. J. Simpson had set the previous year. More than 49,000 fans attended the game, which saw the Bears defeat the Minnesota Vikings 10-7.

=== 1978 ===
- July 4 18,000 attended the 1978 American Legion show.
- July 8 The Rolling Stones US Tour 1978 concert, with Journey, Southside Johnny & The Asbury Jukes and Peter Tosh. A sour note of the event though came with Soldier Field's second accidental death on-record, a concertgoer fell 30 feet from a walkway at the stadium and was pronounced dead on arrival at Mercy Hospital that afternoon.
- August 26 a concert event called Funk Fest was held at Soldier Field, with performances by Parliament-Funkadelic, A Taste of Honey, The Bar-Kays, and Con Funk Shun.
- St. Laurence defeated Sullivan 34–8 in the 1978 Prep Bowl.

=== 1979 ===
- July 4: 15,000 attended the 1979 American Legion show.
- Julian defeated Joliet Catholic 30–22 in the 1979 Prep Bowl.

== 1980s ==
=== 1980 ===
- July 19: Budweiser Summerfest concert featuring James Brown, Smokey Robinson, The O'Jays, Teddy Pendergrass, Two Tons O' Fun (The Weather Girls), and GQ
- Brother Rice defeated Julian in the 1980 Prep Bowl.

=== 1981 ===
- July 4: 6,500 attended the 1981 American Legion show, which also included a WFL Chicago Fire game against the Shreveport Steamer. The Fire won 25–15.
- Mount Carmel defeated Robeson 14–6 in the 1981 Prep Bowl. Mount Carmel were defending IHSA champions, having won the state title in 1980.

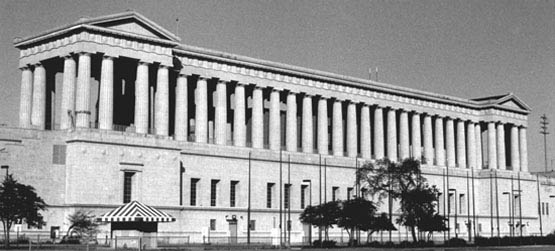
Soldier Field in 1982

=== 1982 ===
- Gordon Tech High School defeated Julian 24–0 in 1982 Prep Bowl.

=== 1983 ===
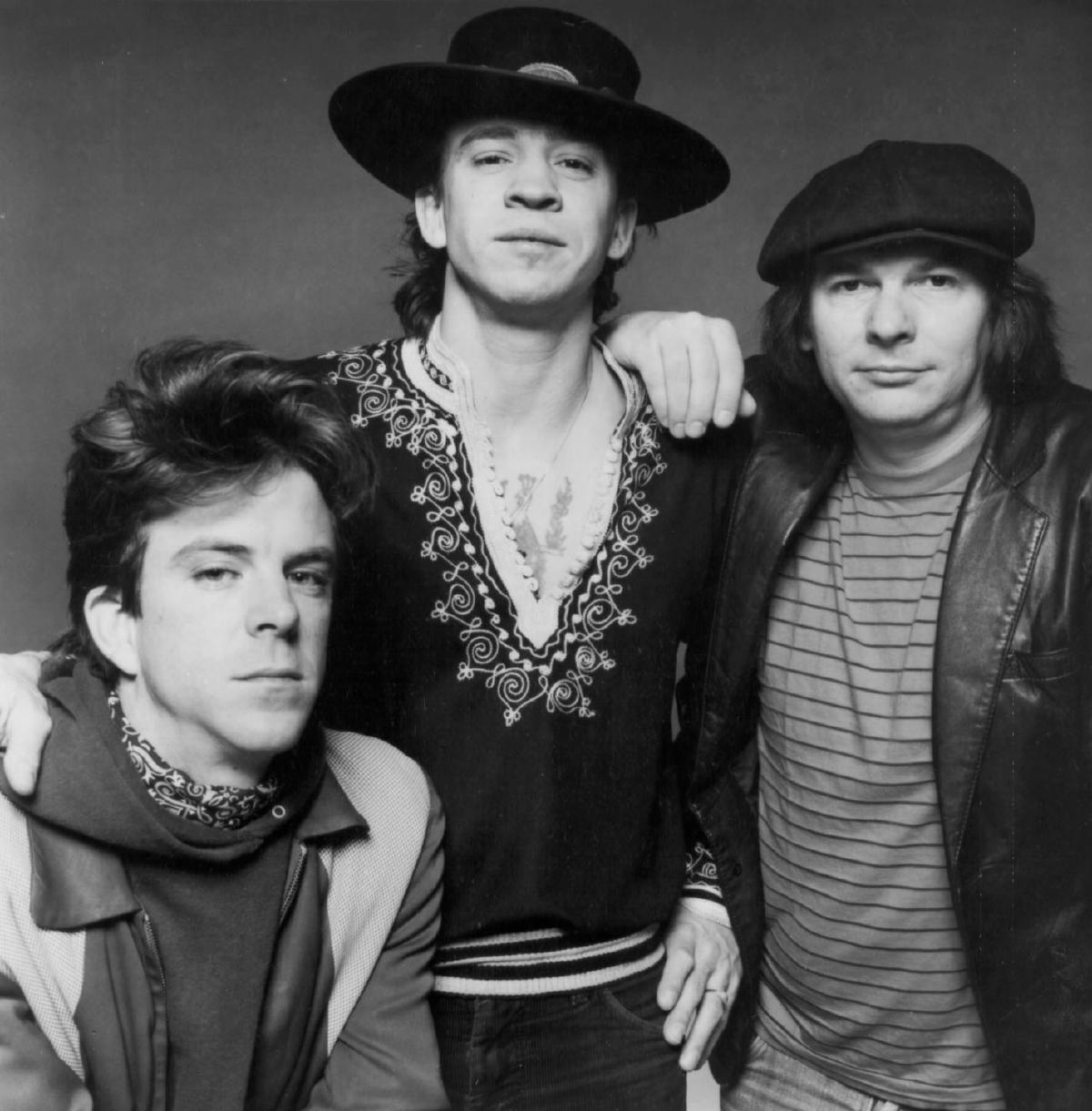
Stevie Ray Vaughan and Double Trouble were among the headliners of 1983's Chicago Fest.

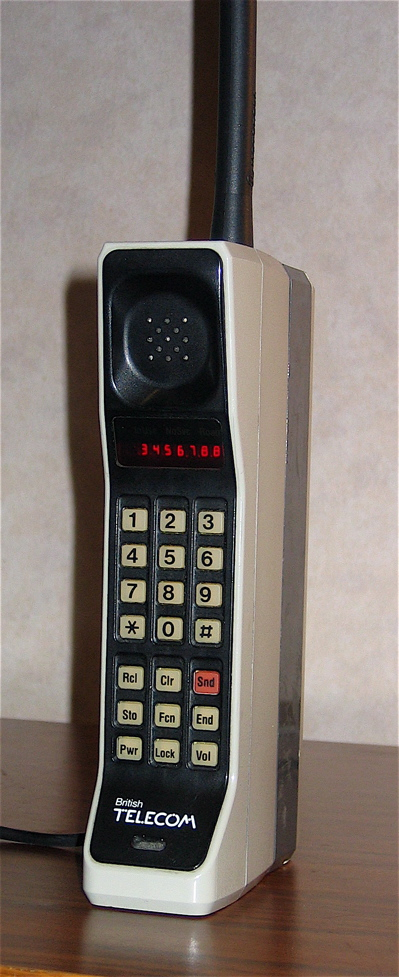
October 13, 1983. The first-ever commercial cell phone was made on a Motorola DynaTAC in Soldier Field's parking lot.

- August 10–18 Soldier Field hosted the final edition of "ChicagoFest." All other editions of Chicago Fest had been held annually at Navy Pier the previous five years. The event featured such acts as Stevie Ray Vaughan and Double Trouble, The Association, The Beach Boys, Buddy Guy and Junior Wells, The Hollies, The Kind, Laura Branigan.
- October 13 David D. Meilahn made the first-ever commercial cell phone call from his 1983 Mercedes-Benz 380SL at Soldier Field on a Motorola DynaTAC. This is considered a major turning point in communications. The call was to Bob Barnett, the former president of Ameritech Mobile Communications, who then placed a call on a DynaTAC from inside of a Chrysler convertible to the grandson of Alexander Graham Bell who was in Germany.
- Mount Carmel defeated Simeon 28–6 in the 1983 Prep Bowl.
- 6,000 spectators saw the Chicago Sting win a North American Soccer League playoff match at Soldier Field. This was the Sting's last postseason game at Soldier Field.

=== 1984 ===
- De La Salle defeated Julian 25–20 in the 1984 Prep Bowl.

=== 1985 ===
- August 9: a sold-out crowd of 71,222 attended a Bruce Springsteen & The E Street Band Born in the U.S.A. Tour concert.
- Mount Carmel defeated Lane Tech 19–14 in the 1985 Prep Bowl.
- 1985 NFC Divisional Playoff: Bears 21, New York Giants 0.
- 1985 NFC Championship Game took place in Soldier Field, where the Bears defeated the Los Angeles Rams 24–0.

=== 1986 ===
- Loyola Academy defeated Simeon 14–12 in the 1986 Prep Bowl.
- November 23 Jerry Markbreit began what would be a 23-season career as an NFL referee (during which he would become one of the league's most recognizable referees) when he refereed a game between the Chicago Bears and the Green Bay Packers. In the second quarter of the game, Bears quarterback Jim McMahon was intercepted, and as he watched the proceedings downfield, Packers defensive end Charles Martin picked up McMahon and bodyslammed him shoulder-first into the AstroTurf. Martin remained hovered over an injured McMahon on one knee and taunted him until Bears offensive tackle Jimbo Covert barreled full-speed into Martin. Despite strenuous protests from Packers coach Forrest Gregg, Markbreit ejected Martin, Markbreit's first ejection as an NFL official. When describing the penalty, Markbreit stated that Martin "stuffed" McMahon into the ground. Martin was suspended for two games by NFL commissioner Pete Rozelle, the longest suspension for an on-field incident until Tennessee Titans defensive tackle Albert Haynesworth was suspended five games by commissioner Roger Goodell for stomping on the face of Dallas Cowboys center Andre Gurode during an October 1, 2006 game During the game, Martin wore a "hit list" towel with the numbers of several Bears listed, including those of McMahon, running back Walter Payton, wide receiver Willie Gault, and center Jay Hilgenberg. The call was largely credited by the media and NFL executives in helping Markbreit land the assignment as the referee of Super Bowl XXI two months later.
- 1986 NFC Divisional Playoff: Washington Redskins 27, Bears 13.

=== 1987 ===
- July 31: a sold-out crowd of 46,923 attended a Madonna Who's That Girl World Tour performance, with Level 42 as the opening act. The concert grossed $751,854.
- Gordon Tech High School defeated Julian 29–14 in the 1987 Prep Bowl.
- 1987 NFC Divisional Playoff: Washington 21, Bears 17.

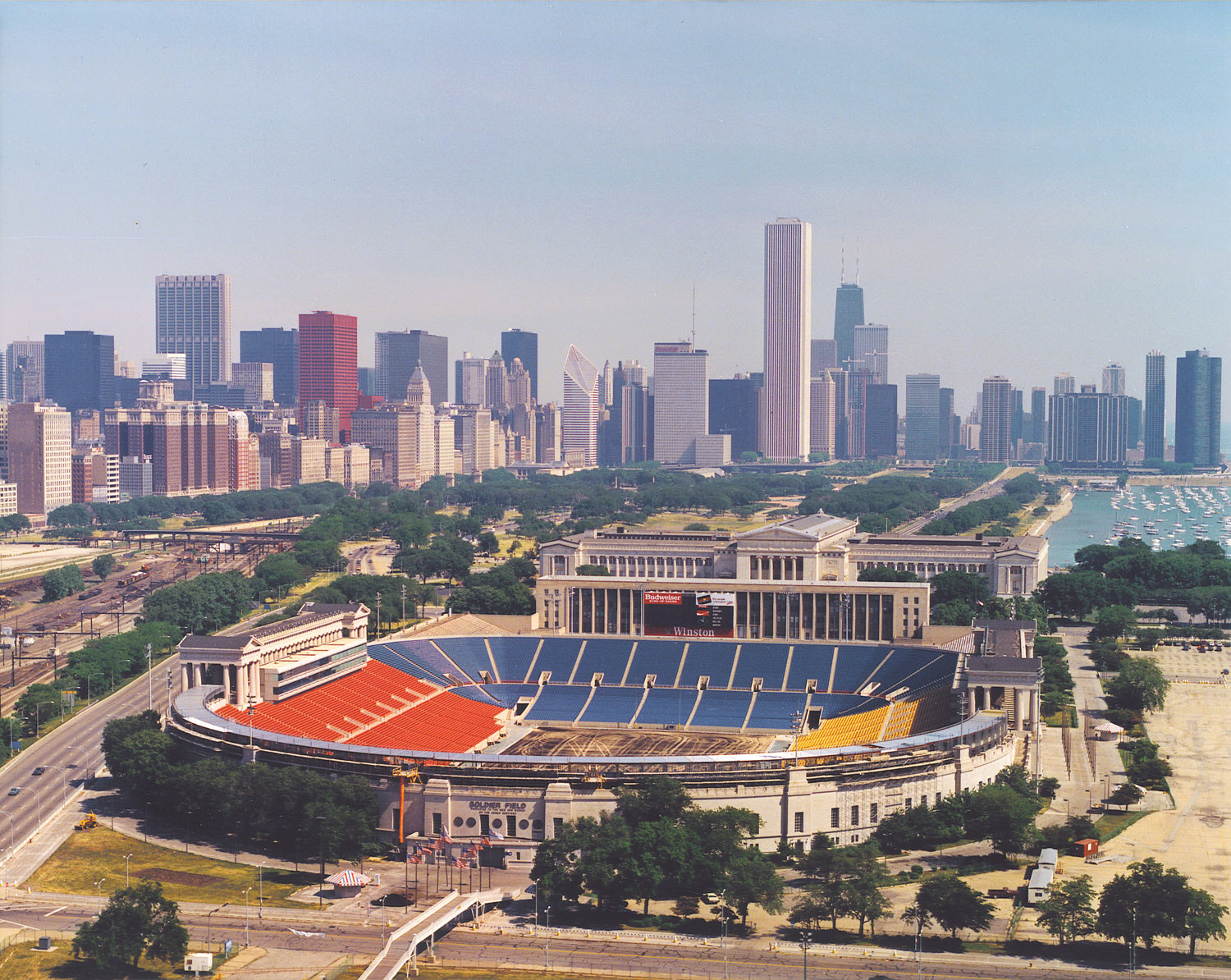
Soldier Field in 1988

=== 1988 ===
- November 28: 2,500 spectators saw Loyola Academy defeat Julian 21–6 in the 1988 Prep Bowl.
- 1988 NFC Divisional Playoff: Bears 20, Philadelphia Eagles 12 (this game is best remembered as the Fog Bowl, where a dense fog covered the stadium, reducing visibility to 15–20 yards.)
- During the annual Special Olympics Chicago in 1988, the Keith Magnuson Spirit Award was presented for the first time. The Spirit Award is presented annually to a team which models the Special Olympics mission by "encouraging physical fitness, demonstrating courage, experiencing joy, and participating in the sharing of gifts, skills, and friendship with their families, community, and other Special Olympic athletes throughout the calendar year".
- The 1988 NFC Championship Game took place here, where the Bears lost to eventual Super Bowl XXIII champions San Francisco 49ers 28–3.
- Julian defeated Fenwick 48–14 in the 1989 Prep Bowl.

=== 1989 ===
- July 20–22 Soldier Field hosted the Marlboro Cup. Among those playing were Brian Bliss, Bruce Murray, David Vanole, Diego Silva, Eduardo de la Torre, Hugo Pérez, Jimmy Banks, John Stollmeyer, Juan Davila, Julio Rodas, Ken Snow, Krzysztof "Kristof" Warzycha, Luis Antonio Valdéz, Mike Windischmann, Paul Caligiuri, Steve Snow, Steve Trittschuh, Tab Ramos and Tony Meola. The tournament's promoter was Mundail Sports Group, a group that was chaired by Clive Toye. The final was attended by 25,102 spectators, which at the time was the largest crowd that had attended a soccer match at Soldier Field since 1976.

Date	Team #1	Result	Team #2	Attendance	Round
July 20	(Poland) Ruch Chorzów	1–3	United States	9,102	Semifinals
July 20	(Mexico) Chivas	2–1	Guatemala		Semifinals
July 22	(Poland) Ruch Chorzów	4–0	Guatemala		Third Place Match
July 22	United States	1–1 (5–3 pen)	(Mexico) Chivas	25,102	Final

- Julian defeated Fenwick 48-14 in the 1989 Prep Bowl.

== 1990s ==
=== 1990 ===
- July 29: Paul McCartney World Tour concert.
- Robeson defeated Gordon Tech High School 48–14 in the 1990 Prep Bowl.
- 1990 NFC Wild Card: Bears 16, New Orleans Saints 6

=== 1991 ===
- June 22 Grateful Dead concert.
- 1991 NFC Wild Card: Dallas Cowboys 17, Bears 13.
- Fenwick defeated Bogan 27–0 in the 1991 Prep Bowl.

=== 1992 ===
- Matches of the 1992 U.S. Cup:

Date	Team #1	Result	Team #2	Spectators
June 3, 1992	United States	1–0	Portugal	10,402
June 6, 1992	United States	1–1	Italy	26,874

- June 25 and 26 Grateful Dead concerts, with the Steve Miller Band.
- September 5, 1992 64,877 spectators saw Notre Dame defeat Northwestern 42–7. It was Notre Dame's first game at Soldier Field in a half-century.
- October 10, 1992 43,692 spectators attended the First Annual Chicago Football Classic, a football game between historically black colleges. The 1992 edition featured the Grambling State Tigers and the Mississippi Valley State Delta Devils.
- Mather defeated Brother Rice 15–6 in the 1992 Prep Bowl.

=== 1993 ===
- 1993 U.S. Cup:

Date	Team #1	Result	Team #2	Spectators
June 13, 1993	Germany	4–3	United States	53,549

- June 17, 18 and 19: Grateful Dead concerts, with Sting.
- September 11: the Tennessee State Tigers and the Jackson State Tigers competed in the Second Annual Chicago Football Classic. The game was won by Jackson State.
- Mount Carmel defeated Bogan 34–14 in the 1993 Prep Bowl.

=== 1994 ===
- July 12 a sold-out crowd of 51,981 attended a Pink Floyd The Division Bell Tour concert. The show grossed $2,056,105.

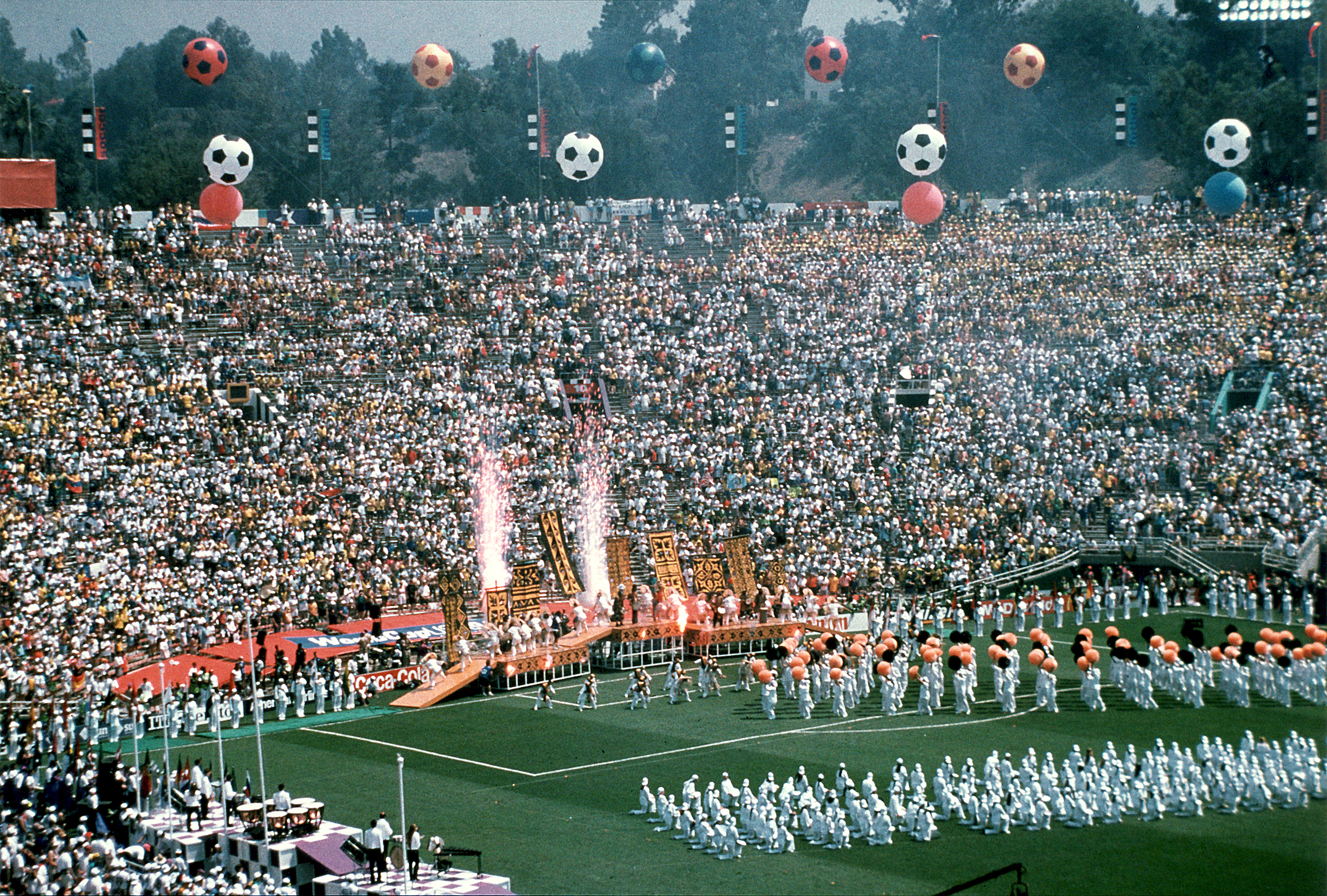
1994 FIFA World Cup opening ceremony

- July 17, 1994, preceding the opening match (also held at Soldier Field), the stadium hosted the opening ceremonies of the 1994 FIFA World Cup. The temperature was hot, at 97 °F, at the beginning of the ceremonies, but dropped down to a cooler 83 °F by the start of the opening match. The event featured Oprah Winfrey, Diana Ross, Daryl Hall, Jon Secada, Richard Marx, President Bill Clinton, Mayor of Chicago Richard M. Daley, World Cup chairman and CEO Alan Rothenberg, 1,500 local high-school students, a 300-person children's choir, and two-thousand volunteer dancers. Portions of the performance included music and folk dancers from the 24 nations that were competing in the World Cup. Over 750 million viewers worldwide watched the ceremony on television.
- 1994 FIFA World Cup matches

Date	Time (CDT)	Team #1	Res.	Team #2	Round	Spectators
June 17, 1994	14:00	Germany	1–0	Bolivia	Group C Opening Match	63,117
June 21, 1994	15:00	Germany	1–1	Spain	Group C	63,113
June 26, 1994	11:30	Greece	0–4	Bulgaria	Group D	63,160
June 27, 1994	15:00	Bolivia	1–3	Spain	Group C	63,089
July 2, 1994	11:00	Germany	3–2	Belgium	Round of 16	60,246

Numerous celebrities were in attendance for the World Cup matches at Soldier, including Plácido Domingo during the match on June 21, as well as such dignitaries as US President Bill Clinton, German Chancellor Helmut Kohl, and Bolivian President Gonzalo Sánchez de Lozada at the opening match.

- July 23 and 24 Grateful Dead concerts, with Traffic.
- September 1 Washington State defeated Illinois 10–9.
- September 3 66,946 spectators saw Notre Dame defeat Wildcats 42–15.
- September 11 and 12 The Rolling Stones Voodoo Lounge Tour concerts, with Lenny Kravitz.
- October 8 the Alabama State Hornets and the Jackson State Tigers competed in the Chicago Football Classic. The halftime entertainment featured a "battle of the bands" between both schools' marching bands. Portions of the pre-game ceremonies honored both Jackson State alumni Lewis Tillman and Alabama State alumni Jesse White. One of the star athletes competing in this game was Alabama State's Reggie Barlow. The game was won by Jackson State.
- Brother Rice defeated Lane Tech 28–22 in the 1994 Prep Bowl.

=== 1995 ===
- July 8 and 9 Grateful Dead concerts, with the Band. The concert on the 9th was the Grateful Dead's final concert before the death of Jerry Garcia.
- July 11 Pearl Jam Vitalogy Tour concert, with Bad Religion and Otis Rush.
- In 1995 Soldier Field was the venue of two international soccer games.
- In 1995 Soldier Field hosted a skateboarding tournament.
- In 1995 Soldier Field hosted a street hockey tournament.
- In 1995 Soldier Field hosted several ethnic and religious festivals including German, Indian, Pan-American, and Polish ones.
- September 30 36,712 spectators saw the Jackson State Tigers defeat the Alabama State Hornets 24-22. This was the third-straight year that Jackson State won the game. Among the star athletes competing in this game was Alabama State's Reggie Barlow.
- 1,100 people saw Loyola Academy defeat Julian 15–14 in the 1995 Prep Bowl.

=== 1996 ===
- May 11–12 Soldier Field's parking lot hosted the annual Windy City Weedfest. This was an event organized by supporters of marijuana/ cannabis legalization. The event was attended by over 25,000. The event had been held elsewhere in Chicago in previous years. Rev Michael Pfleger was present to protest marijuana use at the event. Following the festival, the Chicago Park District (owners of the stadium) refused to allow the event to be held at Soldier Field again due to widespread cannabis use at the event.
- September 14, 1996 Little Feat concert, with Taj Mahal.
- In 1996 the Promise Keepers drew 69,000 to an event at Soldier Field.
- Loyola Academy defeated Dunbar 28–8 in the 1996 Prep Bowl.

=== 1997 ===
- June 27, 28 and 29, U2 PopMart Tour concerts, with the Fun Lovin' Criminals and Rage Against the Machine.
- July 18 Vans Warped Tour concert. The 1997 Vans Warped Tour featured Bad Religion, Blink-182, Descendants, Hed PE, Jimmy 2 Times, Lagwagon, Latex Generation, Less Than Jake, Limp Bizkit, The Mighty Mighty Bosstones, Millencolin, Murder City Devils, Orange 9mm, Pennywise, Reel Big Fish, Sick of It All, Snot (now known as Tons), Social Distortion, Strung Out, Sugar Ray, Trading Bryson, Vision of Disorder, and White Kaps. The list of artists that have participated in the Warped Tour over the years is an extensive one.
- August 23 Northwestern defeated Oklahoma 24–0 in the 1997 Pigskin Classic.
- The College Football Classic was revived, having not been played the previous year, with the inaugural edition of the current incarnation of the game. The game saw Melvin Williams and Steve Wofford lead the Southern Jaguars defeat the Mississippi State Delta Devils 51-30.
- September 23 and 25 The Rolling Stones kicked off their Bridges to Babylon Tour performing two sold-out shows at Soldier Field with Blues Traveler. The two dates had a combined attendance of 107,186 and grossed $6,260,000.
- Dunbar defeated Marian Catholic 28–21 in the 1997 Prep Bowl.

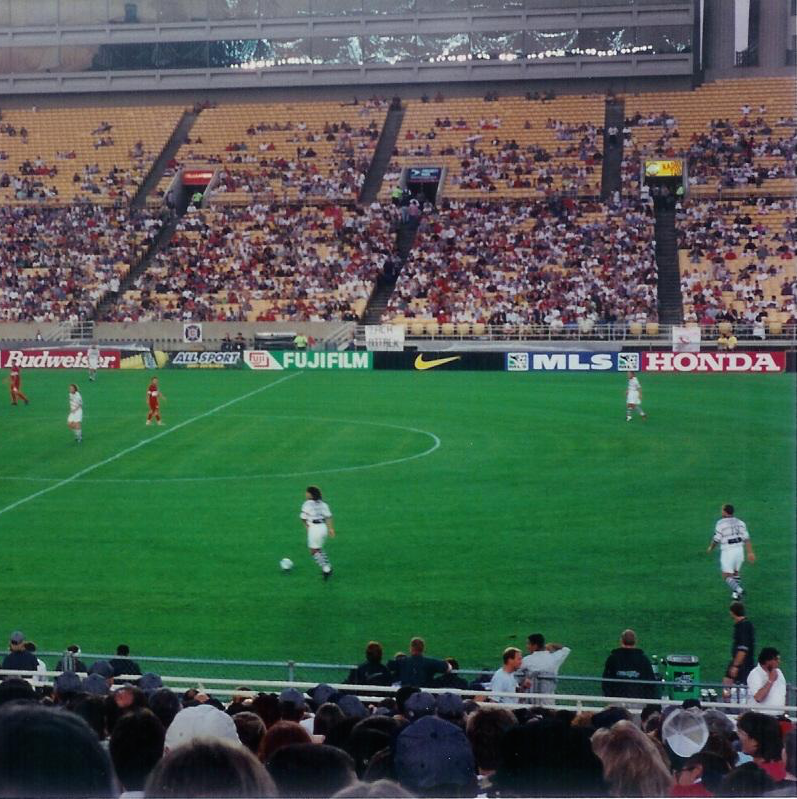
In 1998 the MLS' Chicago Fire played their inaugural season at Soldier Field.

=== 1998 ===
- May 10, 1998 George Strait Country Music Festival Tour concert.
- Over 36,000 spectators saw the MLS' Chicago Fire play their first home game ever. The Chicago Fire defeated the Tampa Bay Mutiny 2-0.
- September 12 the Alcorn States Braves faced Virginia State Trojans in the 1998 Chicago Football Classic.
- 1998 U.S. Open Cup Final:

Date	Team #1	Res.	Team #2	Spectators
October 30, 1998	Columbus Crew (MLS)	1–2 (ASDET)	Chicago Fire (MLS)	18,615

- Hubbard defeated Joliet Catholic 28–16 in the 1998 Prep Bowl.

=== 1999 ===
- April 25 George Strait Country Music Festival Tour concert.
- 1999 FIFA Women's World Cup matches:

Date	Time (CDT)	Team #1	Res.	Team #2	Round	Spectators
June 24, 1999	19:30	North Korea	1–2	Denmark	Group A	65,080
June 24, 1999	17:00	Brazil	2–0	Italy	Group B	65,080
June 26, 1999	18:30	Norway	4–0	Japan	Group C	34,256
June 26, 1999	16:00	Ghana	0–2	Sweden	Group D	34,256

- September 4 the Alcorn State Braves faced the Grambling State Tigers in the Chicago Football Classic.
- 35,000 spectators saw Hubbard defeat De La Salle 20–13 in the 1999 Prep Bowl.

== 2000s ==
=== 2000 ===
- May 13: Wilco concert.
- 2000 U.S. Cup:

Date	Team #1	Result	Team #2	Spectators
June 4, 2000	Republic of Ireland	2–2	Mexico	36,469

- June 29 and 30: Dave Matthews Band concerts, with Ben Harper & The Innocent Criminals and Ozomatli
- July 20–22: Bassmaster Classic weigh-ins were held at Soldier Field. The boats used in the competition were docked nearby at Burnham Harbor. The competition took place within the Chicago-area in Lake Michigan and its connected waterways. The Bassmaster Classic is a major fishing competition, sometimes dubbed to be the "Superbowl of Fishing". Live coverage of the event was streamed online. This was the 30th edition of the competition. 45 competitors participated in the competition At the end of the competition, a closing ceremony was held at Soldier Field with performances (including Grammy-winning singer Trisha Yearwood) and fireworks. Competitor, and 1999 champion, Davy Hite, failed to defend his title in the 2000 edition. The winner of the competition was Woo Daves, who, at 54, became the oldest person to win a Bassmaster Classic title. It was Daves' 15th time competing in the Classic. Daves received a $100,000 prize. In descending order, the top six finishers were Woo Daves (Spring Grove, Virginia), Mark Rizk (Antelope, California), Shaw Grigsby Jr. (Gainesville, Florida), Rick Clunn (Ava, Missouri), Kotaro Kiriyama (Tokyo, Japan), and Norio Tanabe (Tokyo, Japan). This was the 27th consecutive (and overall) Classic that third-place finisher Rick Clunn had competed in. It was Kevin VanDam's 10th consecutive Classic, with VanDam then having managed to make the Classic every season of his ten-years in B.A.S.S. competition. This was also the Larry Nixon's 22nd, Gary Klein's 19th, Georg Cohcharn's 18th, and Ron Sheffield's 12th total Classic. The 2000 edition was considered to be one of the most challenging editions of the Bassmaster Classic. Chicago was the third northern location to host the event, with Alexandria Bay, New York City (Saint Lawrence River) and Cincinnati (Ohio River) having previously hosted the 1980 and 1983 editions, respectively.
- September 2: the Howard Bisons faced the Jackson State Tigers in the Chicago Football Classic.
- 2000 Lamar Hunt U.S. Open Cup Final:
October 21, 2000

Miami Fusion (MLS)	1–2	Chicago Fire (MLS)
Wélton 90'	(Report)	Hristo Stoitchkov 44'; Tyrone Marshall 88' (o.g.)

Soldier Field
Chicago
Attendance: 19,146
Referee: Kevin Stott (USA)
- Marian Catholic defeated Simeon 23–14 in the 2000 Prep Bowl.

=== 2001 ===
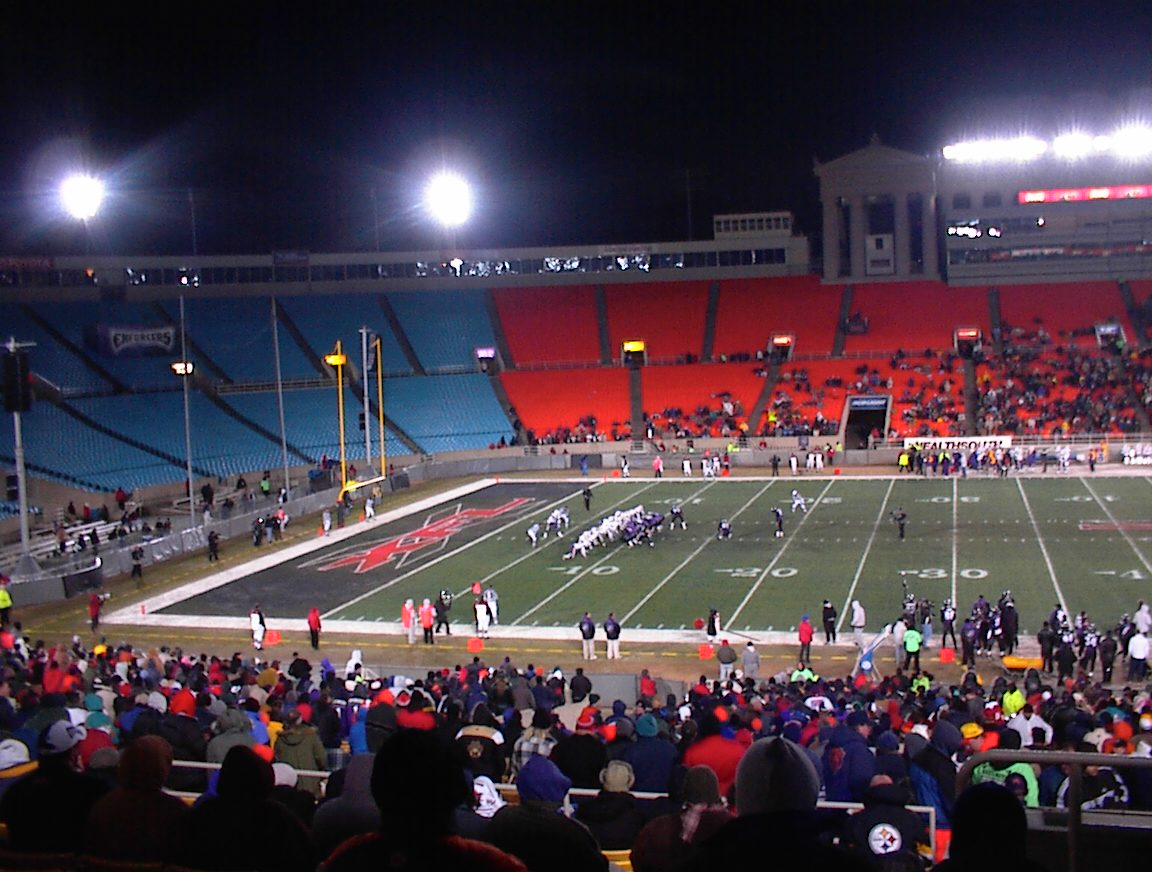
The XFL Chicago Enforcers play at Soldier Field, 2001

- February 10 XFL Chicago Enforcers first home game. Was played against NY/NJ Hitmen.
- April 7 XFL Chicago Enforcers final home game. Was played against Orlando Rage.
- June 16 and 17 'N Sync PopOdyssey concerts, with BBMak, 3LW and Dream.
- June 24 30,000 attended a celebration of the new millennium held by Chicago's Catholic archdiocese.
- July 6 and 7 Dave Matthews Band concerts, with Buddy Guy and Angélique Kidjo. These two concerts were attended by a total of 170,000 concertgoers. Recordings from the later date were included on The Warehouse 5 Volume 2.
- September 1 the Jackson State Tigers faced the Howard Bisons in the Chicago Football Classic. The game was attended by 50,000 spectators.
- September 9 Soldier Field hosted 2001 Women's U.S. Cup. These matches were preceded by an opening match at Schwaben Field in the Chicago suburb of Buffalo Grove two days prior. The second game played at Soldier Field was the third and the final game played in the tournament, as the tournament's additional matches were cancelled following the 9/11 terrorist attacks, which occurred while the tournament was still in its round-robin phase.

Date	Team #1	Result	Team #2	Spectators
September 9, 2001	United States	4–1	Germany	10,235
September 9, 2001	China	3–0	Japan	

- Mount Carmel defeated Morgan Park 50–0 in the 2001 Prep Bowl.
- 2001 NFC Divisional Playoff: Philadelphia 33, Bears 19. This was also the last home game before the renovations took place.

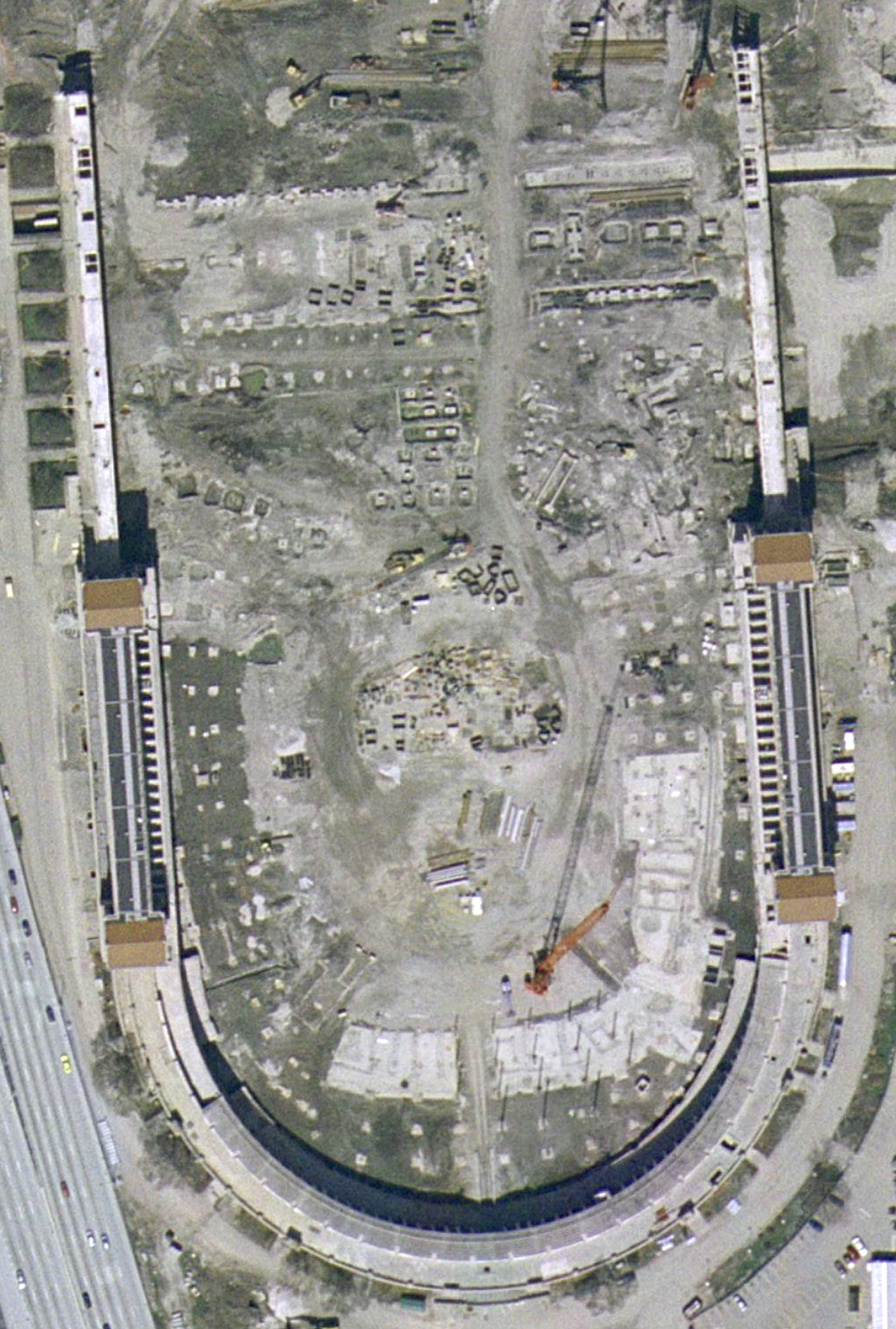
Overhead view of Soldier Field in 2002, during its renovation

=== 2002 ===
No events took place due to Soldier Field's renovation.

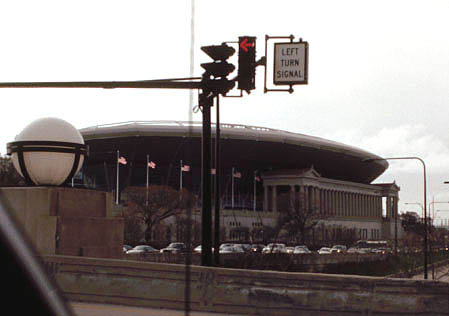
Soldier Field in 2003

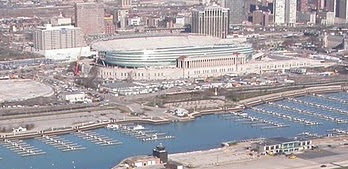
Soldier Field in April 2003

=== 2003 ===
- The Chicago Bears moved back into Soldier Field for after playing their home games in Memorial Stadium at the University of Illinois in Champaign for their 2002 season. The Chicago Fire also returned after spending a season at Benedetti–Wehrli Stadium in Naperville.
- In the autumn the newly reopened stadium hosted a meeting of AT&T's Illinois salespeople in its banquet hall lounge.
- Loyola Academy defeated Simeon 22–14 in the 2003 Prep Bowl.
- The week after Christmas a winter festival, including snowman building contest, was held in the newly created parkland surrounding the renovated stadium.

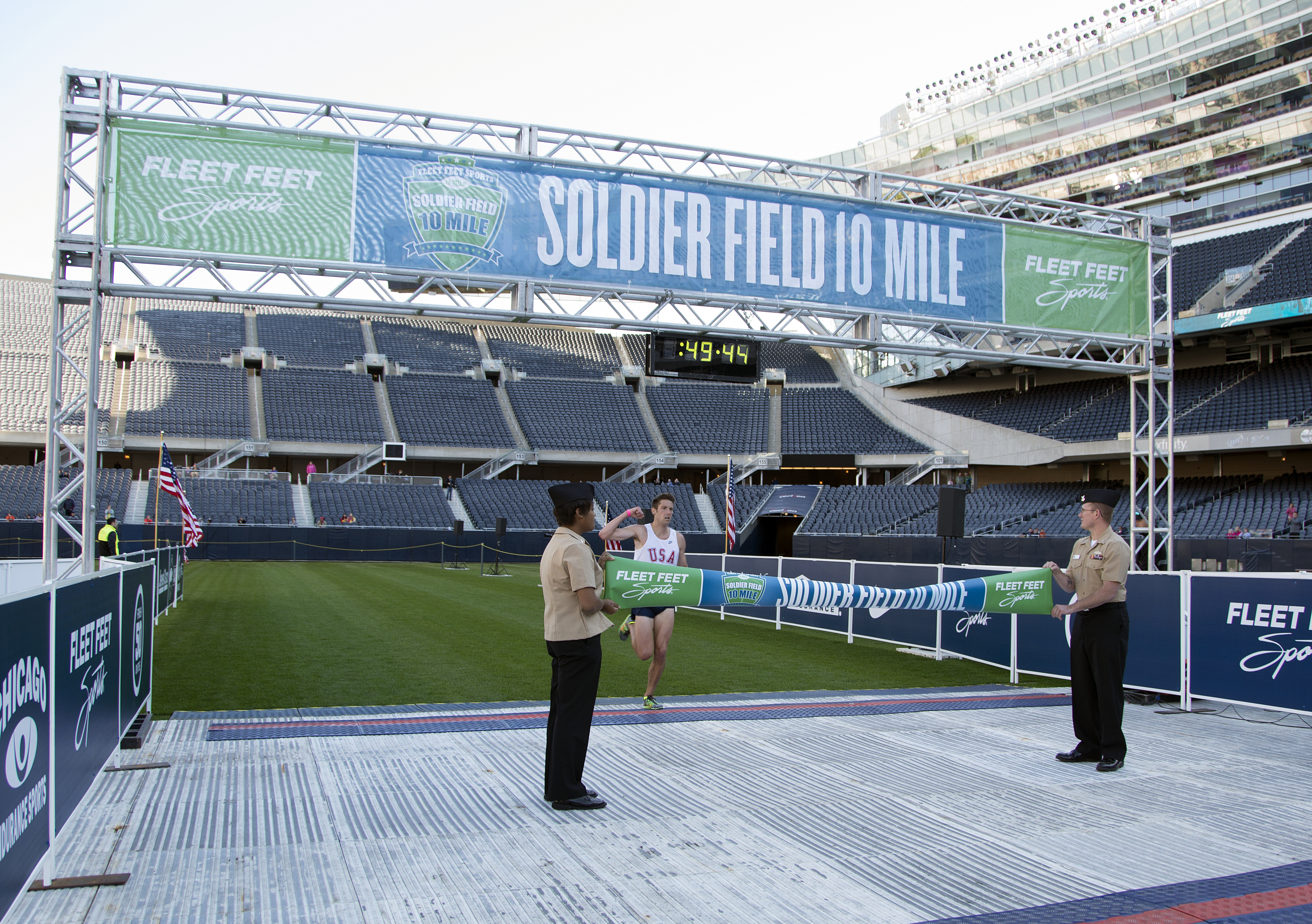
The Soldier Field 10 Mile has been held annually since 2004.

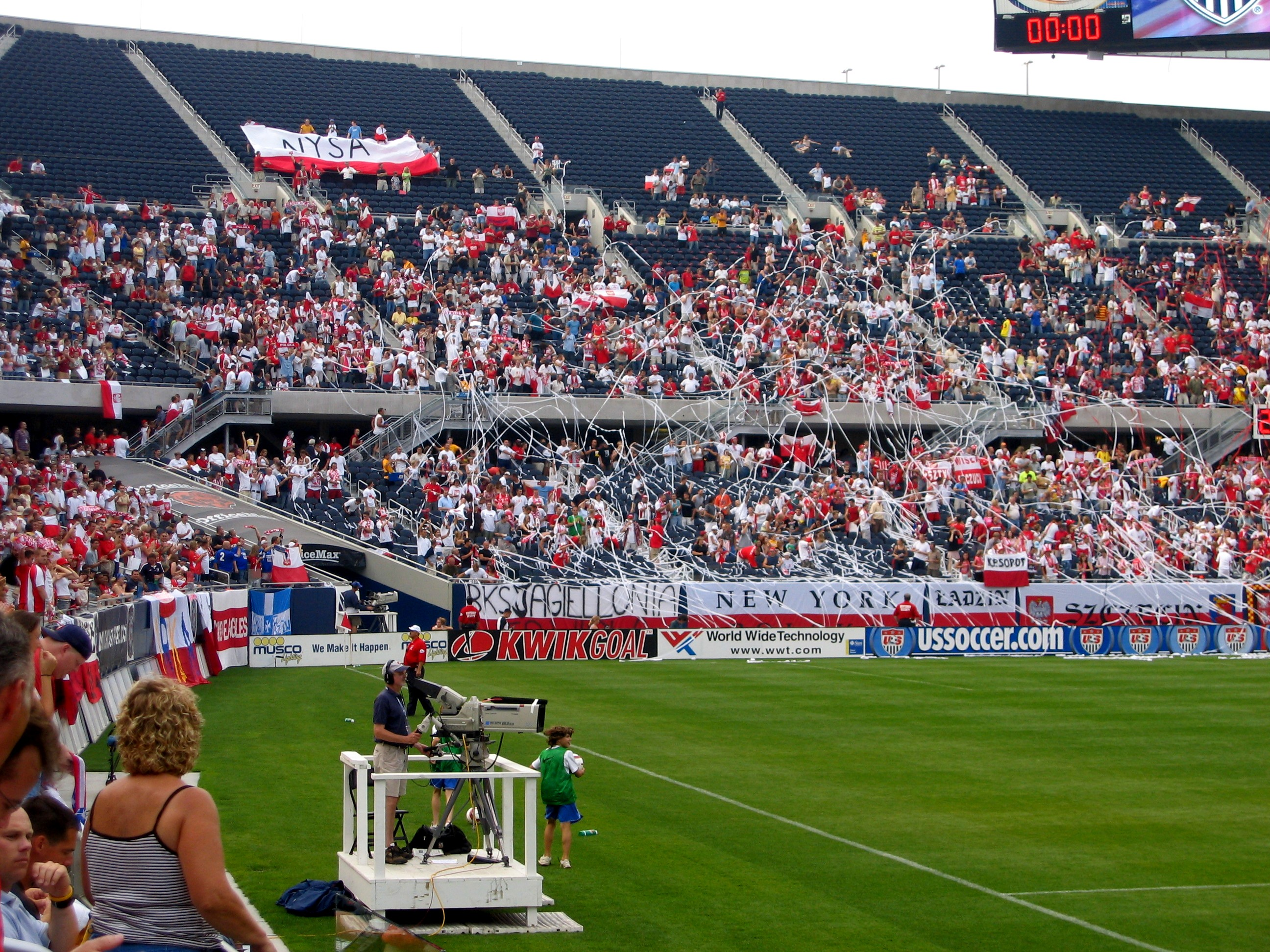
July 11, 2004 USA vs. Poland international-friendly

=== 2004 ===
- In early 2004 a snowboarding competition was held at Soldier Field's sledding hill (part of the new parkland that was created around the stadium during its renovation).
- May 29 the inaugural edition of the Soldier Field 10 Mile was held. This race has been held every year since.
- July 11 USA vs. Poland international-friendly soccer match. The game finished 1–1.
- October 9 the Mississippi Valley State Delta Devils faced the Grambling State Tigers in the Chicago Football Classic.
- Brother Rice defeated Lane Tech in the 2004 Prep Bowl.

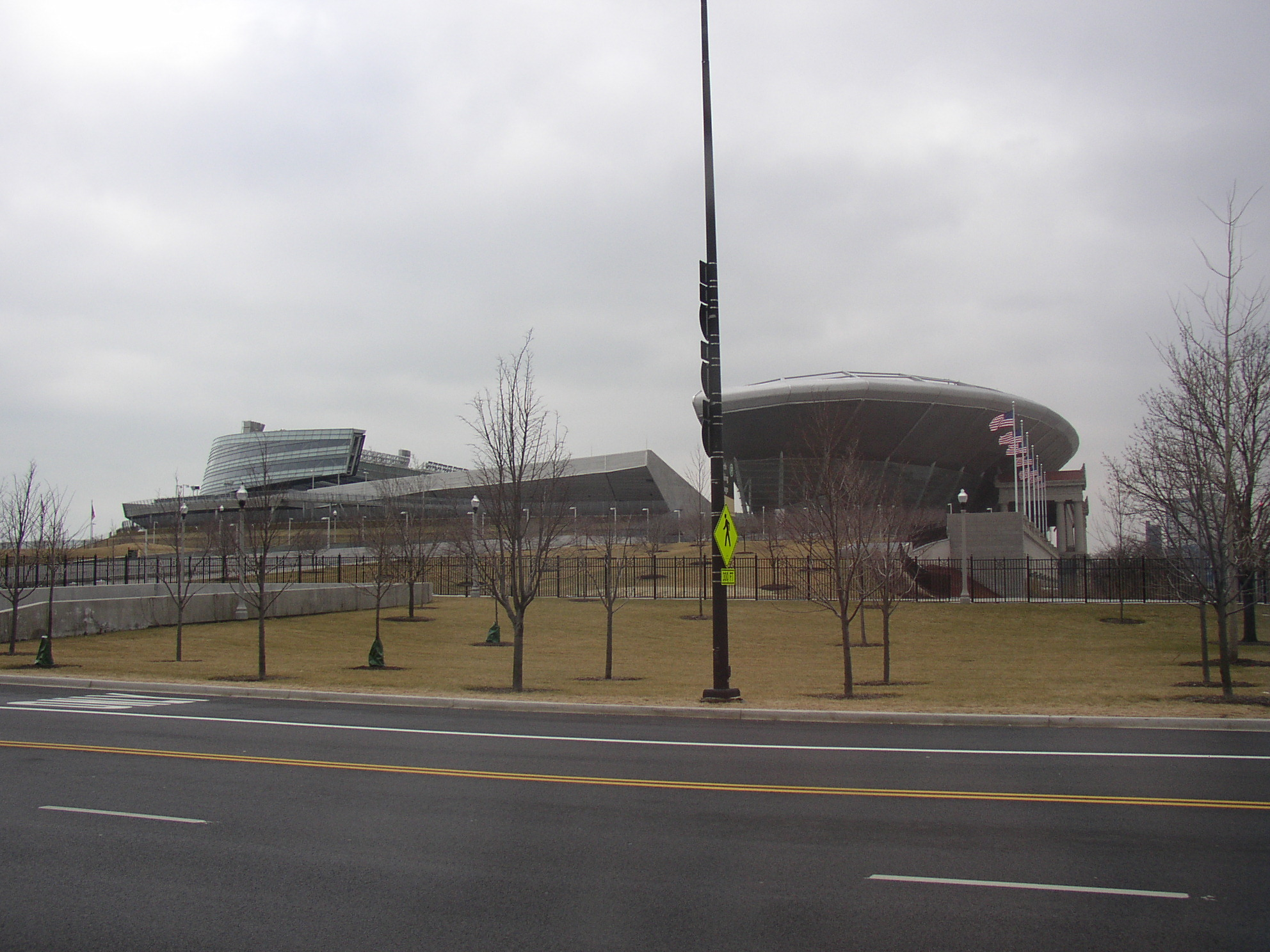
Soldier Field in 2005

=== 2005 ===
- In 2005, the inaugural Kickoff Classic, an annual preseason Soldier Field matchup of two high-ranking high school football teams, was played.
- In 2005, a Formula DRIFT race was held in the stadium's parking lot.
- September 10 The Rolling Stones A Bigger Bang concert, with Los Lonely Boys
- Morgan Park defeated Brother Rice in the 2005 Prep Bowl.
- 2005 NFC Divisional Playoff: Carolina Panthers 29, Bears 21

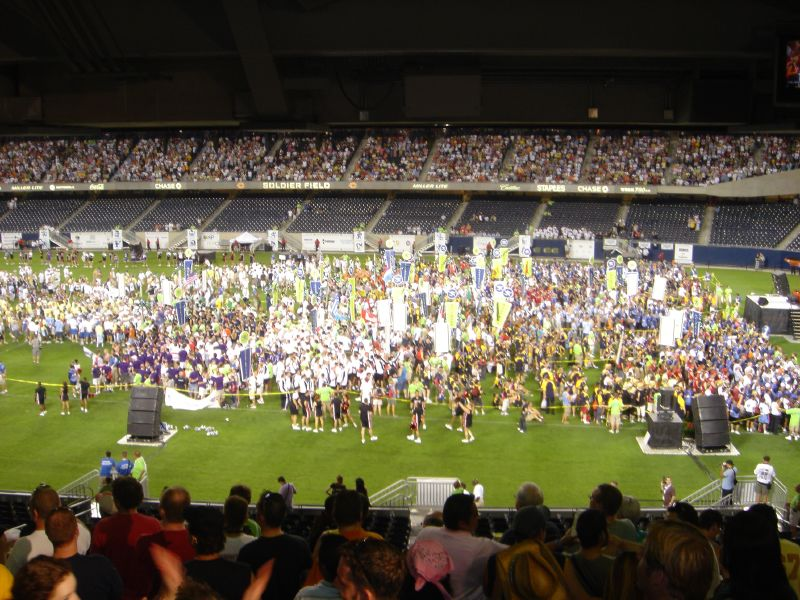
Opening ceremonies of the 2006 Gay Games

=== 2006 ===
- July 15 Soldier Field hosted the opening ceremonies of the 2006 Gay Games. 40,000 spectators attended. Mayor of Chicago Richard M. Daley delivered a speech at the event. The ceremony featured the likes of George Takei, Megan Mullally, Margaret Cho, Greg Louganis, Jody Watley, Frankie Knuckles, Andy Bell, Staceyann Chin, Jorge Valencia, Keith Boykin, James Hormel, Holly Near, Barbara Higbie, Nedra Johnson, Teresa Trull, Kate Clinton, Saskia Webber, Billy Bean, Heather Small, Esera Tuaolo, and Suzanne Westenhoefer. The event also included a performance by the cast of Avenue Q. Among the event's several choreographers was Christopher Harrison.
- July 21 60,000 spectators attended Bon Jovi concert, with Nickelback, on the Have a Nice Day Tour. The concert lasted three hours, the longest a concert had ever at Soldier Field.
- In 2006, a Formula DRIFT race was held in the stadium's parking lot.
- October 11: The Rolling Stones A Bigger Bang concert, with Elvis Costello & The Imposters.
- Brother Rice defeated Hubbard 24–14 in the 2006 Prep Bowl.
- 2006 NFC Divisional Playoff: Bears 27, Seattle Seahawks 24 (OT)

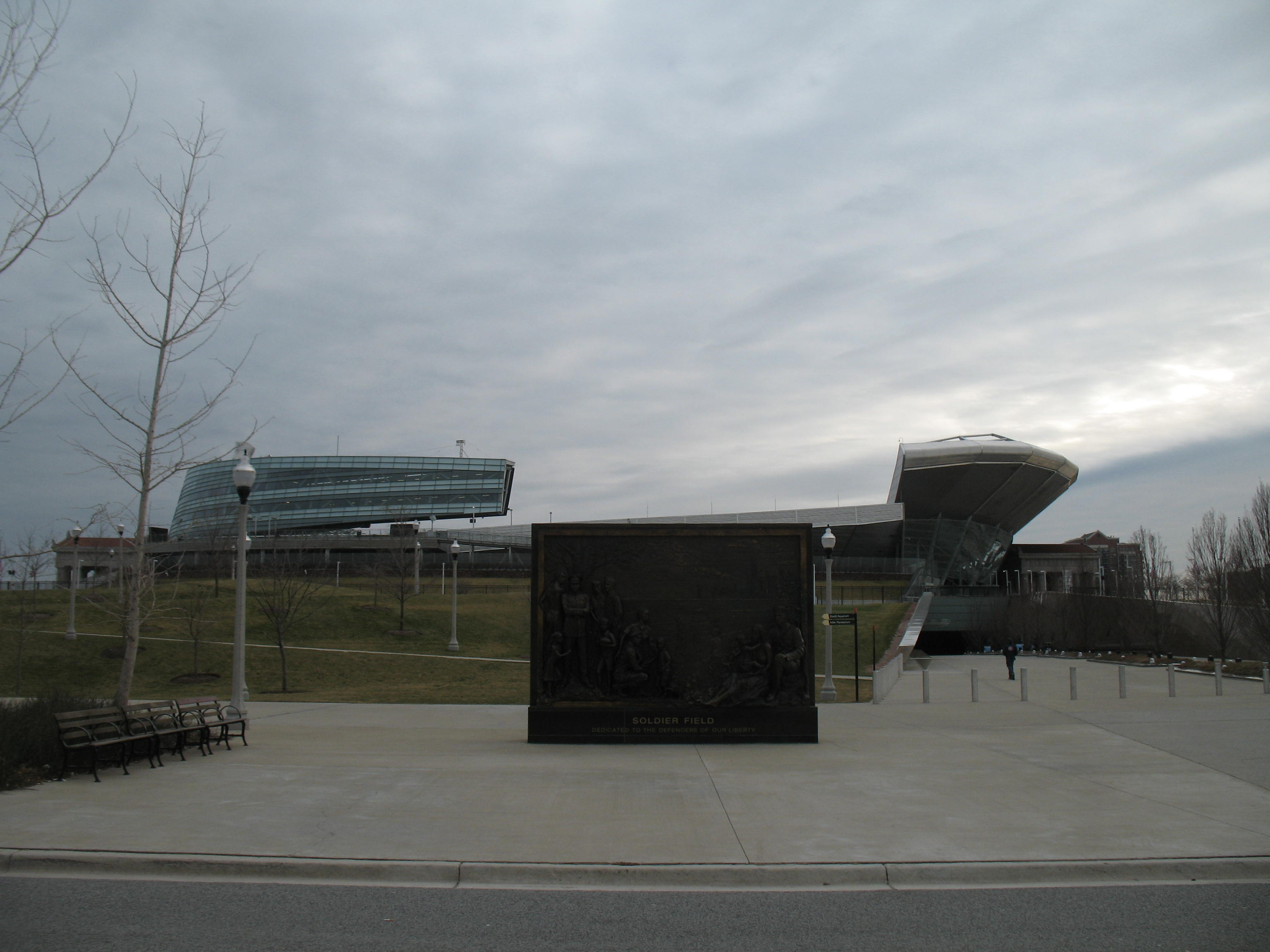
Soldier Field in 2007

=== 2007 ===
- January 21 the 2006–2007 NFC Championship Game granted the Bears their second trip to the Super Bowl, the first in 21 years, with a 39–14 victory over the New Orleans Saints.
- 2007 CONCACAF Gold Cup

Date	Time (CDT)	Team #1	Res.	Team #2	Round	Spectators
June 21, 2007	18:00	Canada	1–2	United States	Semi-finals	50,760
June 21, 2007	18:00	United States	2–1	Mexico	Final	60,000

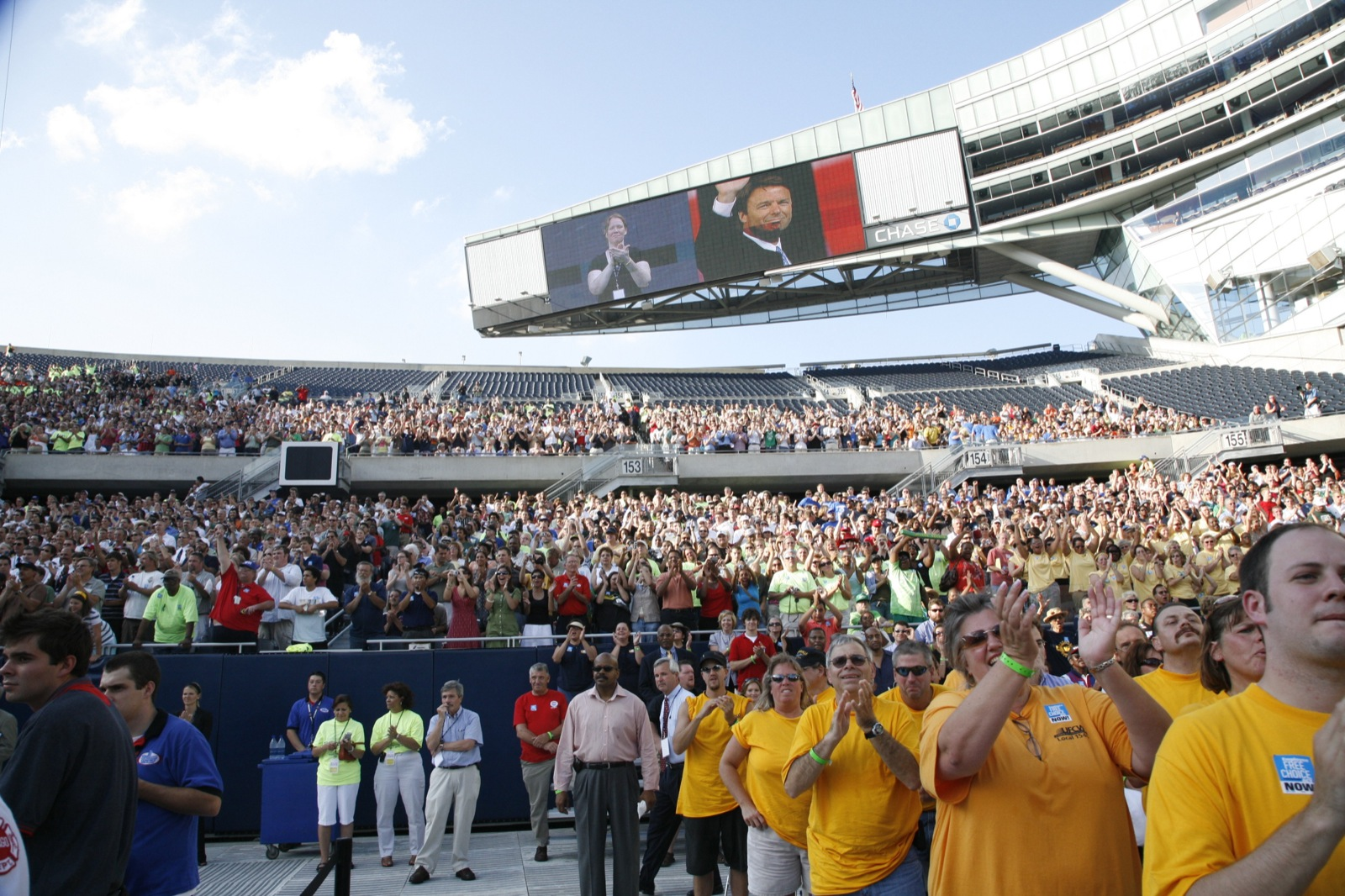
Crowd at the AFL–CIO Working Families Vote Presidential Forum

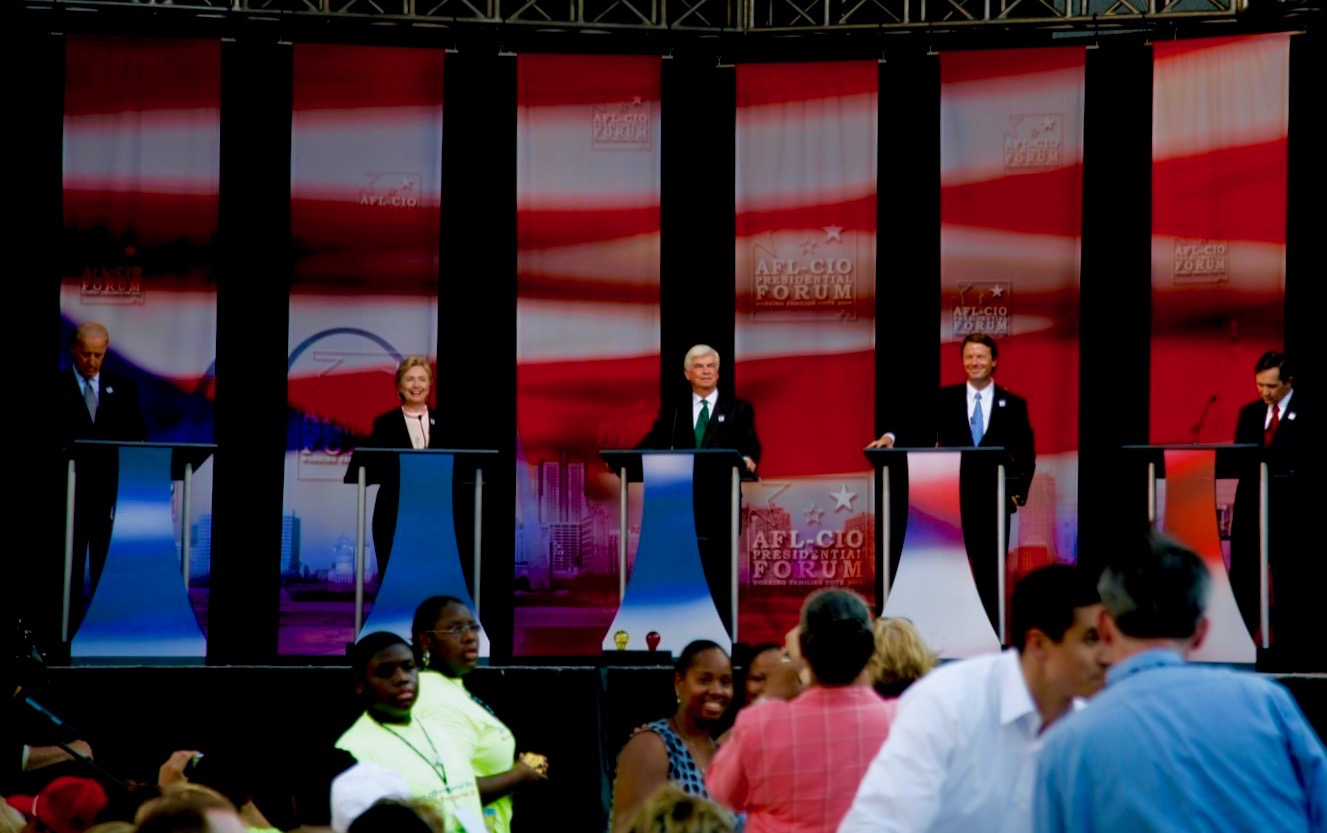
(from left to right) Biden, Clinton, Dodd, Edwards and Kucinich during the AFL–CIO Working Families Vote Presidential Forum (Obama and Richardson, who were to the left of Biden, are not pictured)

- August 7 Democratic presidential candidates Hillary Clinton, Barack Obama, Joe Biden, Bill Richardson, Chris Dodd, John Edwards, and Dennis Kucinich participated in the AFL–CIO Working Families Vote Presidential Forum, a Democratic presidential debate, was held at Soldier Field before a crowd of approximately 15,500 union members. The forum was moderated by Keith Olbermann broadcast by MSNBC. The candidates spoke from a stage in Soldier Field's north end zone. Clinton was, at the time, a Senator, a former First Lady, and would later become Secretary of State and serve as the Democratic nominee for President in the 2016. Obama was, at the time, a senator, and would ultimately become president. Biden was, at the time, a senator, and would ultimately become vice president. Richardson was, at the time, Governor of New Mexico and was also a former Secretary of Energy, UN Ambassador, and Representative. Edwards was a former senator and had previously been the Democratic nominee for vice president in the 2004 election. Dodd was, at the time, a senator and a former representative. Kucinich was, at the time, a representative and the former mayor of Cleveland.
- The 2007 edition of the annual Special Olympics Chicago featured an opening ceremony with a performance by the Jesse White Tumbling Team and a speech from Special Olympics Illinois CEO Doug Snyder. The Keith Magnuson Spirit Award was presented by Keith's son Kevin Magnuson to the D.S. Wentworth School, largely due to the efforts of their lead coach Ophelia Doyle who accepted the award for the school's team.
- 2007 Chicago Trophy football tournament:

Date	Team 1	Result	Team 2
July 27, 2007	(Italy) Reggina Calcio	1-1	(Poland) Wisła Kraków
July 27, 2007	(Spain) Sevilla FC	1-0	(Mexico) Club Toluca
July 29, 2007	(Italy) Reggina Calcio	0-2	(Mexico) Club Toluca
July 29, 2007	(Spain) Sevilla FC	0-1	(Poland) Wisła Kraków

- August 26, at the halftime of a high school football game at Soldier Field Fenwick and Hubbard at Soldier Field, Johnny Lattner's #34 jersey was retired by Fenwick. Lattner played for Fenwick when he was in high school, and would later go on to play football collegiately (where he would win the 1953 Heisman Trophy) and professionally. This was the first time Fenwick had ever retired a number.
- September 1 the NIU faced the University of Iowa in the first Division I College Football game at Soldier Field since its renovations. Iowa defeated NIU 16–3. A capacity crowd of 61,500 attended the game, setting a Mid-American Conference record for a home game in football (the match was considered a home game for NIU).
- September 9 the United States men's soccer team played Brazil national team in a friendly match.
- Saint Rita defeated Morgan Park 50–0 in the 2007 Prep Bowl.

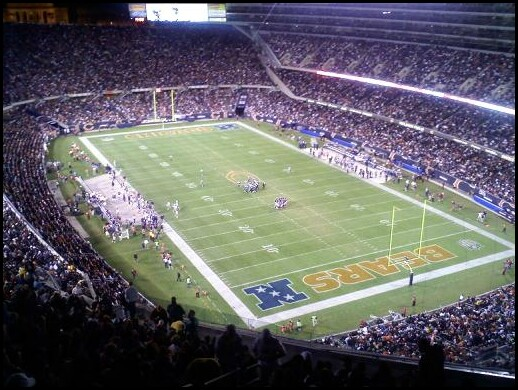
The Bears playing at Soldier Field in 2008

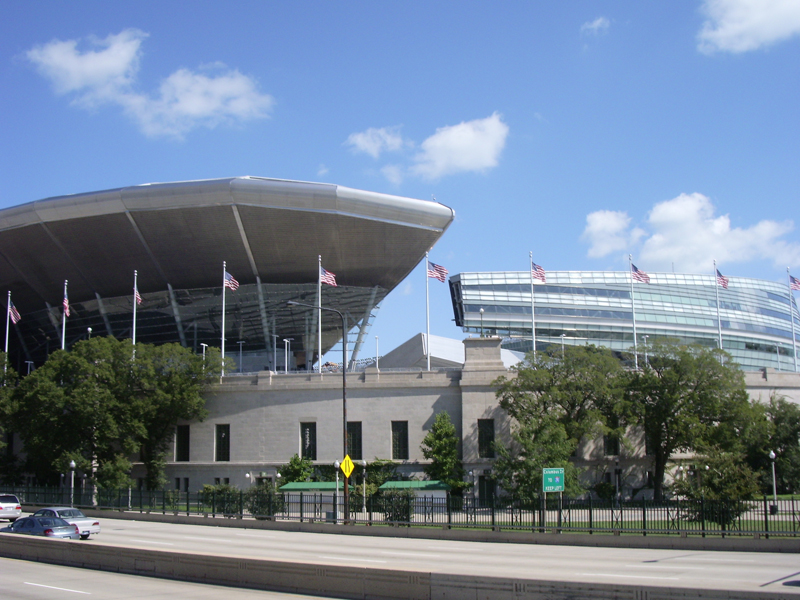
Soldier Field in 2008

=== 2008 ===
- June 8 33,608 attended an international friendly between Mexico and Peru, which Mexico won 4–0.
- June 21 Kenny Chesney concert, with Keith Urban, LeAnn Rimes and Gary Allan.
- August 3 CD Guadalajara vs. FC Barcelona international-friendly soccer match. Barcelona won the match 5–2.
- October 11 and 12 Chicago Country Music Festival
- Loyola Academy defeated Lane Tech 17-0 in the 2008 Prep Bowl.

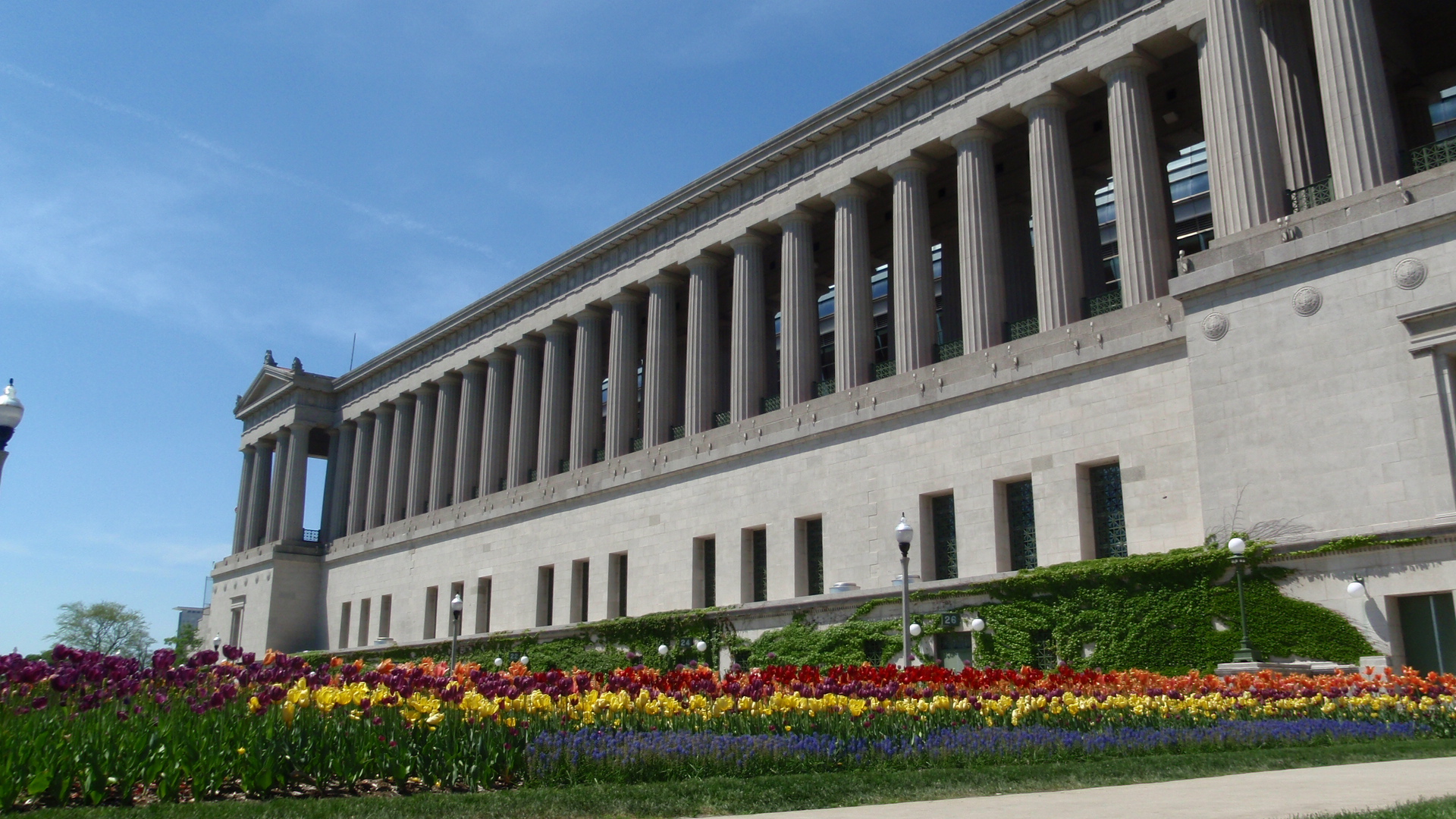
Soldier Field in 2009.

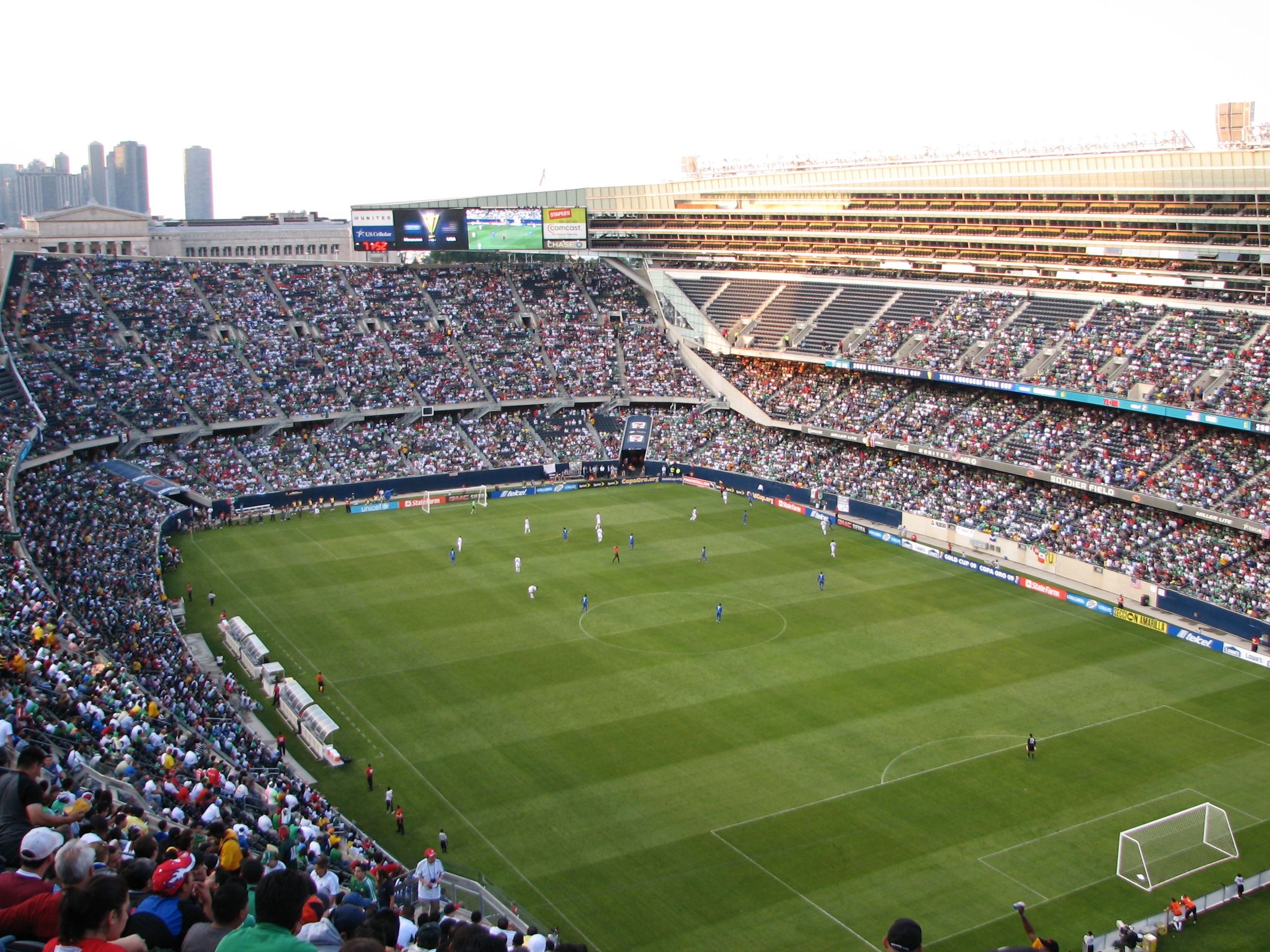
The US faces Honduras at Soldier Field during the 2009 CONCACAF Gold Cup.

=== 2009 ===
- May 30: 4,300 spectators were in attendance as Soldier Field played host to its first lacrosse match. For their season-opener the Major League Lacrosse's Chicago Machine faced the Boston Cannons at Soldier Field. The Cannons defeated the Machine 16–14. This was the first professional lacrosse match ever played within the city limits of Chicago, as all previous Chicago Machine games had been played in suburban locations.
- June 13: Kenny Chesney concert, with Lady Antebellum, Miranda Lambert, Montgomery Gentry and Sugarland
- 2009 CONCACAF Gold Cup

Date	Time (CDT)	Team #1	Res.	Team #2	Round	Spectators
July 23, 2009	18:00	Honduras	0–2	United States	Semi-finals	55,173
June 23, 2009	21:00	Costa Rica	1–1	Mexico	Semi-finals	55,173

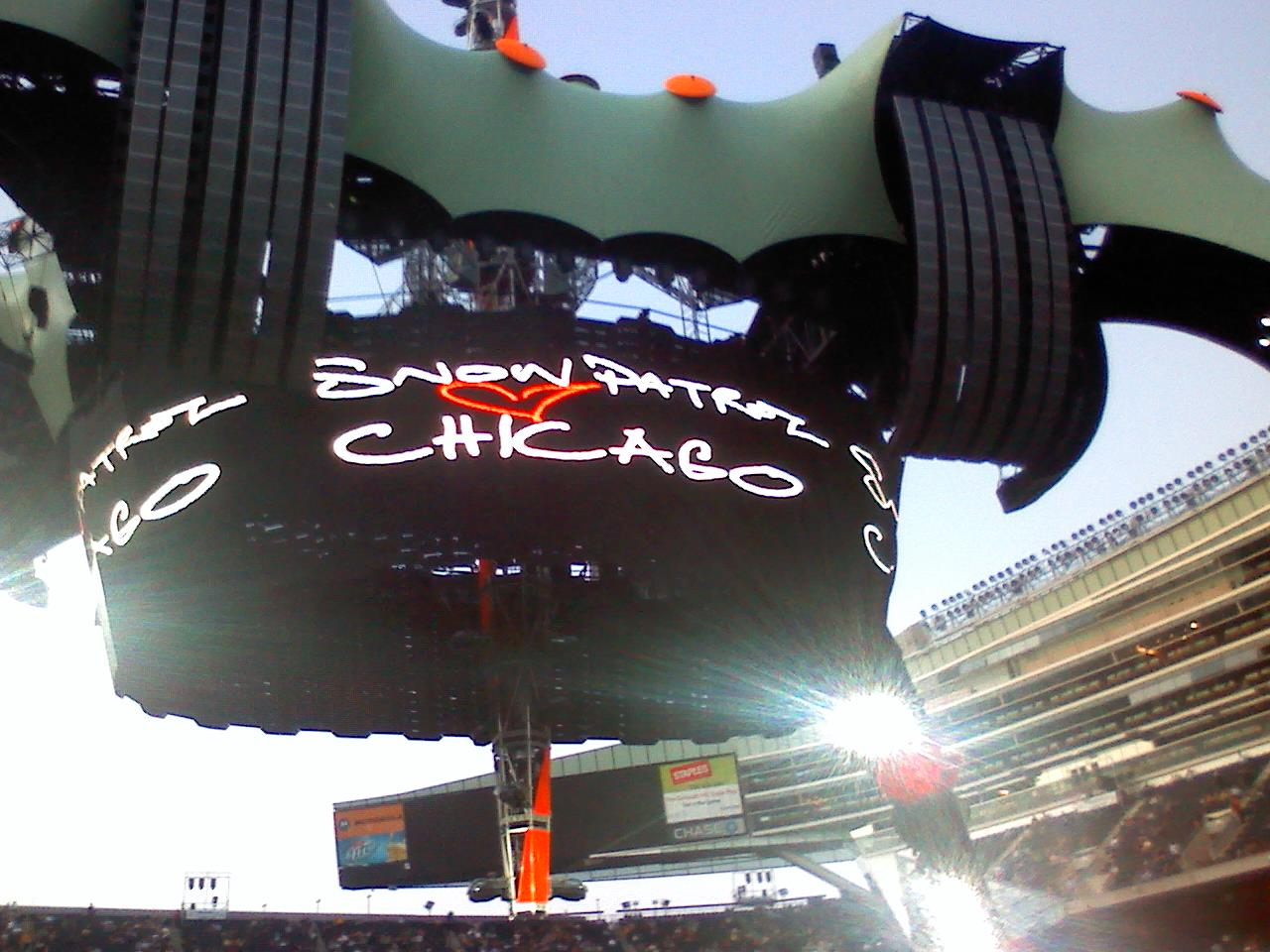
Soldier Field configured for 360° Tour in 2009

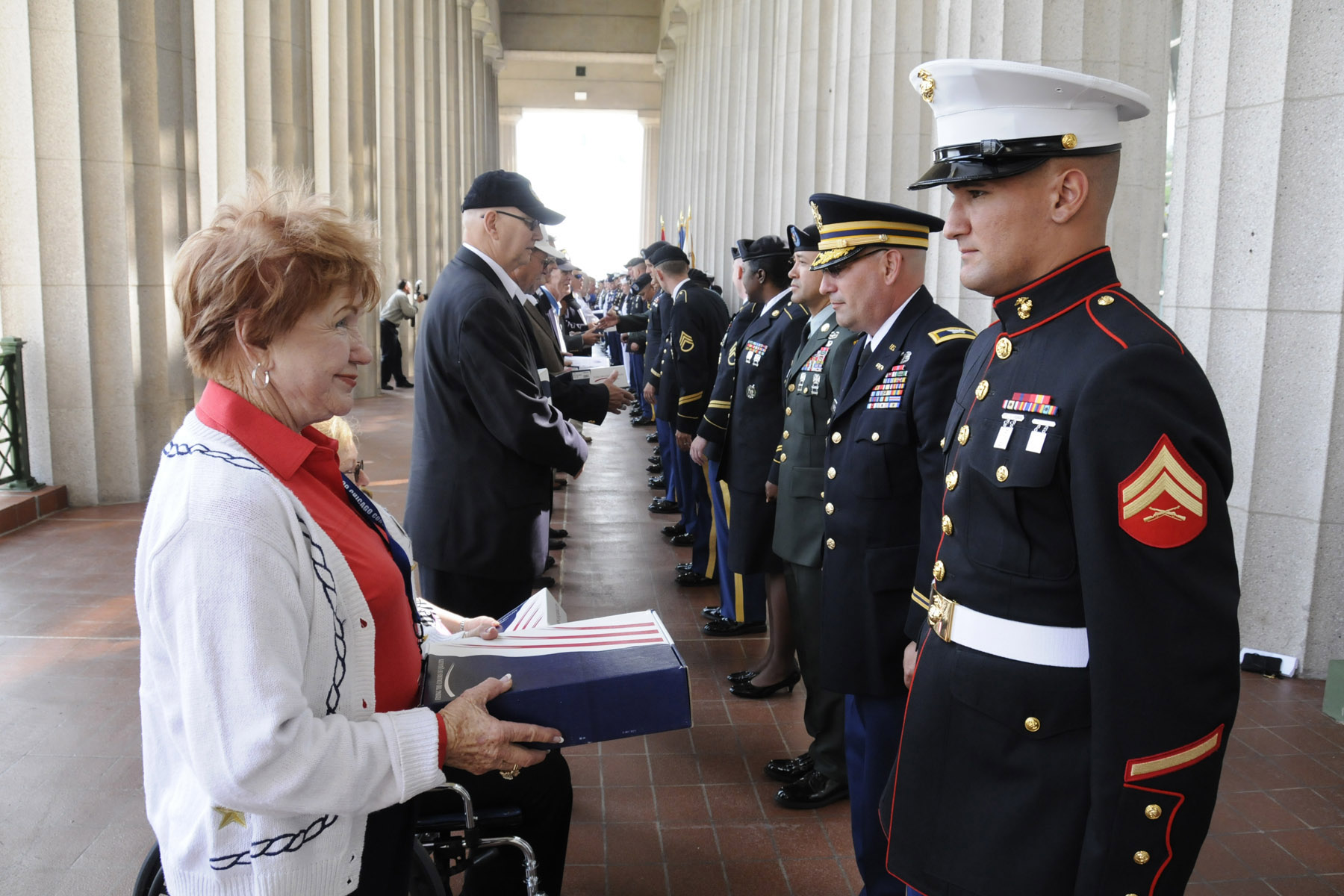
2009 Medal of Honor Convention

- August 8: Major League Lacrosse's Chicago Machine hosted the Long Island Lizards at Soldier Field for their season closer.
- September 12 and 13 U2 kicked off the second leg of their 360° Tour with to sold-out concerts, with Snow Patrol and Interpol, attended by a cumulative 135,872 concertgoers. These concerts opened up U2's 360° Tour in North America. One of the dates set Soldier Field's post-renovation attendance record at the time, with 67,936 spectators.
- September 15: Soldier Field hosted the 2009 Medal of Honor Convention.
- Saint Rita defeated Simeon 34–20 in the 2009 Prep Bowl.

== 2010s ==
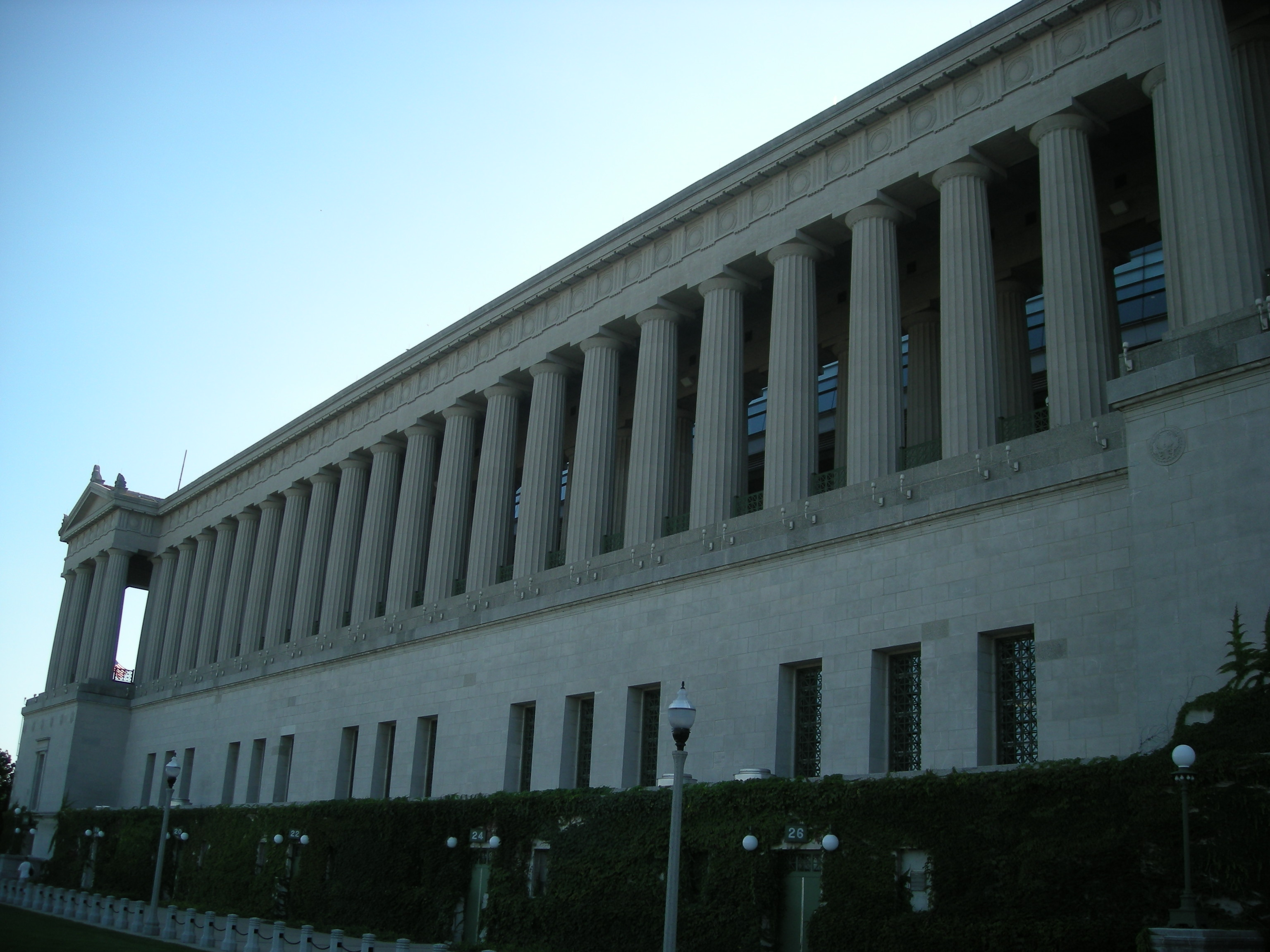
Soldier Field in 2010

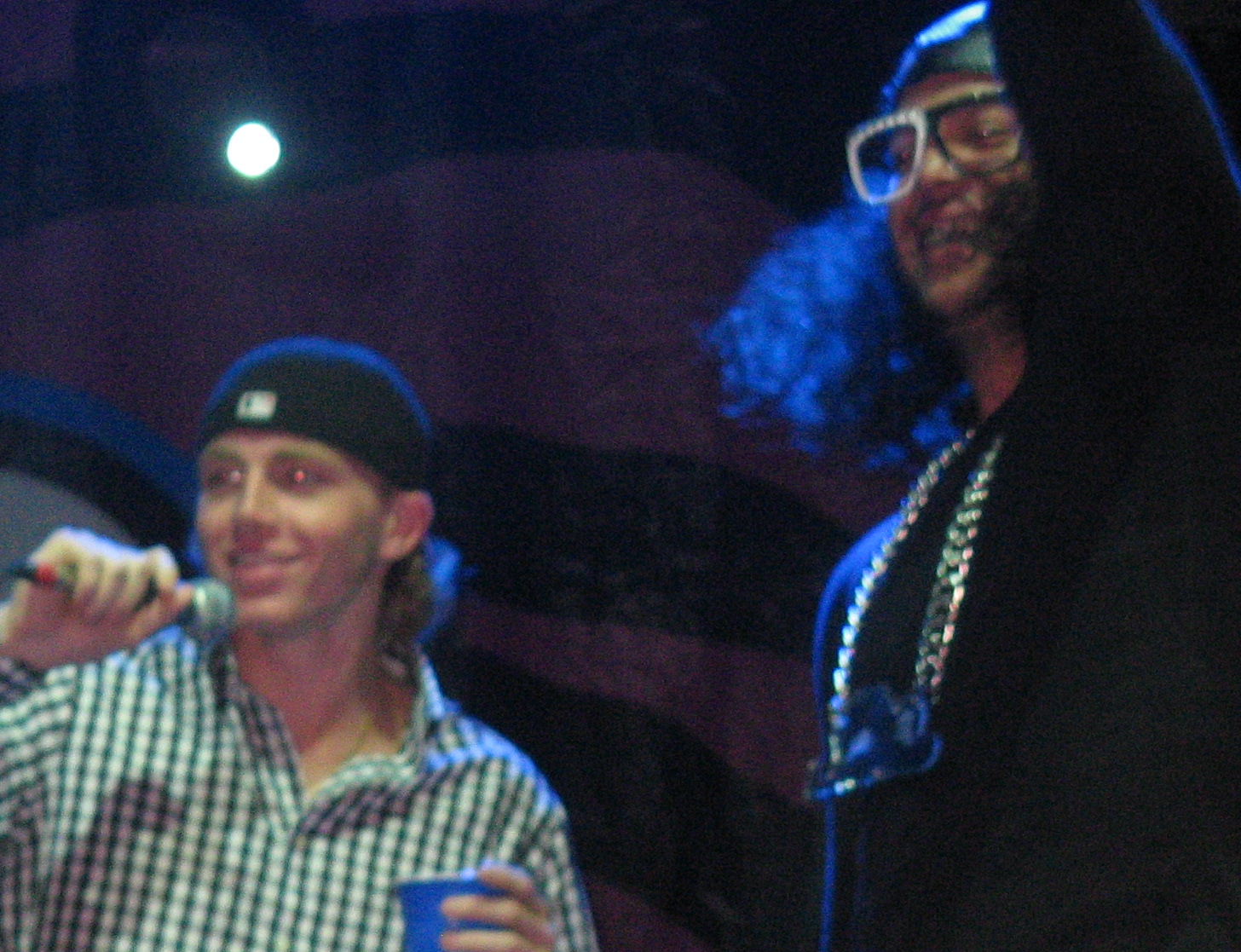
2010 Stanley Cup champion Chicago Blackhawk Patrick Kane (left) joins Sky Blue (of LMFAO) on-stage during Bamboozle Road Show 2010.

=== 2010 ===
- June 12: The Bamboozle Roadshow concert event in Soldier Field's parking lot. This event featured All Time Low, Boys Like Girls, Cady Groves, Forever the Sickest Kids, Good Charlotte, Hellogoodbye, LMFAO, Third Eye Blind, the Prices, the Ready Set, Stereo Skyline, and Vita Chambers.
- June 19: 29,233 spectators attended an Eagles Long Road Out of Eden Tour concert, with the Dixie Chicks and JD & the Straight Shot.
- July 2: deadmau5 concert, with Rye Rye and Brazilian Girls.
- July 23–24: Soldier Field's 'South Festival Lot' hosted the 2010 Dew Tour's Nike 6.0 BMX Open.
- July 30 and 31: sold-out crowds totaling in 95,959 spectators attended two Bon Jovi The Circle Tour concerts, with Kid Rock, Twisted Brown Trucker and 7th Heaven.
- October 9: 31,696 saw the United States men's national soccer team play the Poland national football team to a 2–2 draw.
- Fenwick defeated Curie 6–0 in the 2010 Prep Bowl.
- 2010 NFC Divisional Playoff: Bears 35, Seattle Seahawks 24.
- 2010 NFC Championship Game matched the Bears against the Green Bay Packers, where the Bears were defeated by the eventual Super Bowl XLV champions, 21–14.

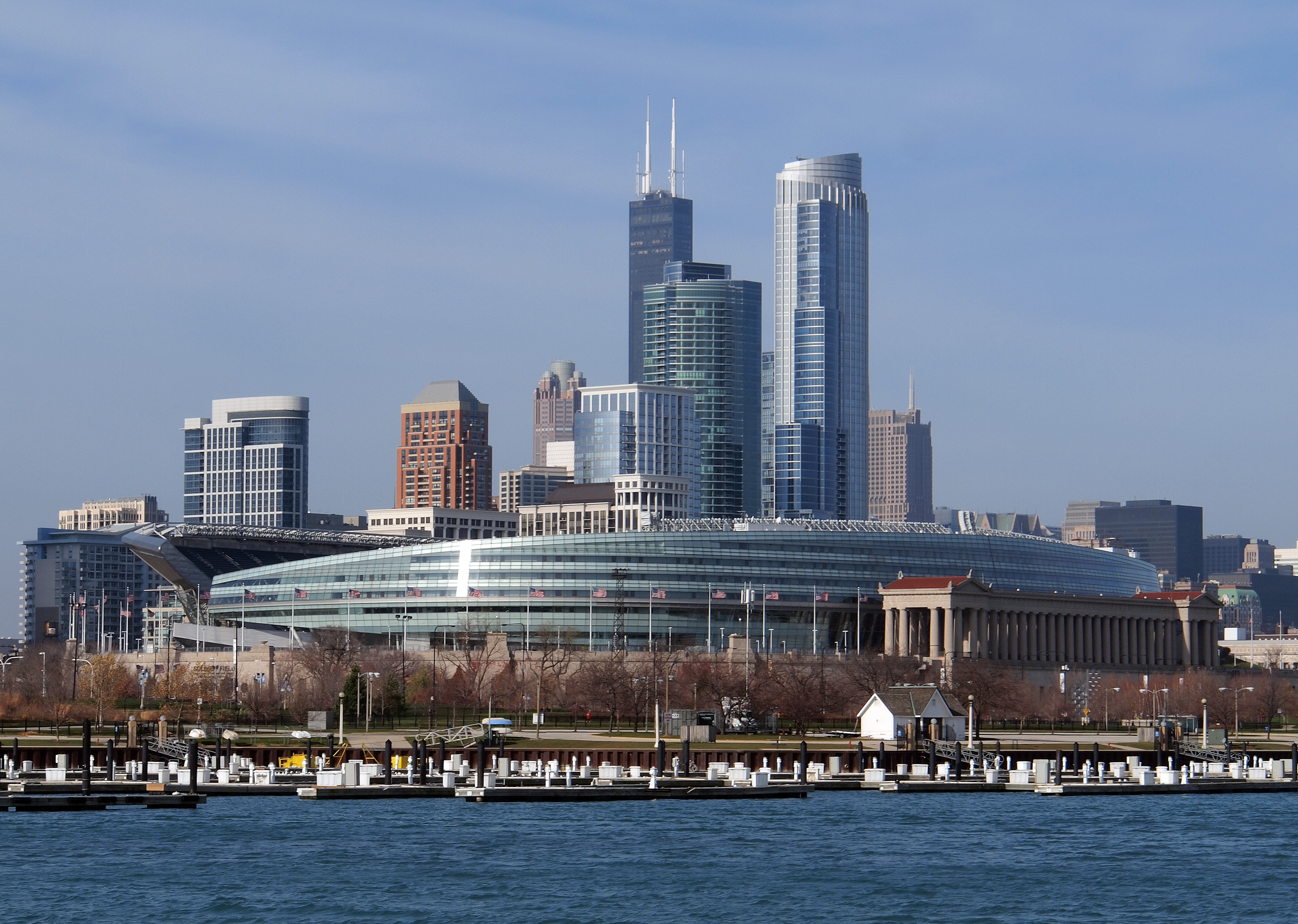
Soldier Field in 2011

=== 2011 ===
- June 2011 international soccer match between Chicago Fire and Manchester United.
- Soldier Field was a venue of the 2011 CONCACAF Gold Cup hosting two matches:

Date	Time (CDT)	Team #1	Res.	Team #2	Round	Spectators
June 12, 2011	18:00	El Salvador	6–1	Cuba	Group A	62,000
June 12, 2011	20:00	Mexico	4–1	Costa Rica	Group A	62,000

- July 5: a sold-out crowd of 64,297 attended an U2 360° Tour concert, with Interpol.
- August 2011: the U.S. Paralympic Team Valor Games Midwest were held at Soldier Field.
- August 23: Wayne Baker Brooks Band concert, with Sugar Blue.
- September 3: the Texas A&M Aggies faced the Hampton Pirates in the Chicago Football Classic.
- September 17: the NIU Huskies returned to play the Wisconsin Badgers in a game that was called "Soldier Field Showdown II".

=== 2012 ===
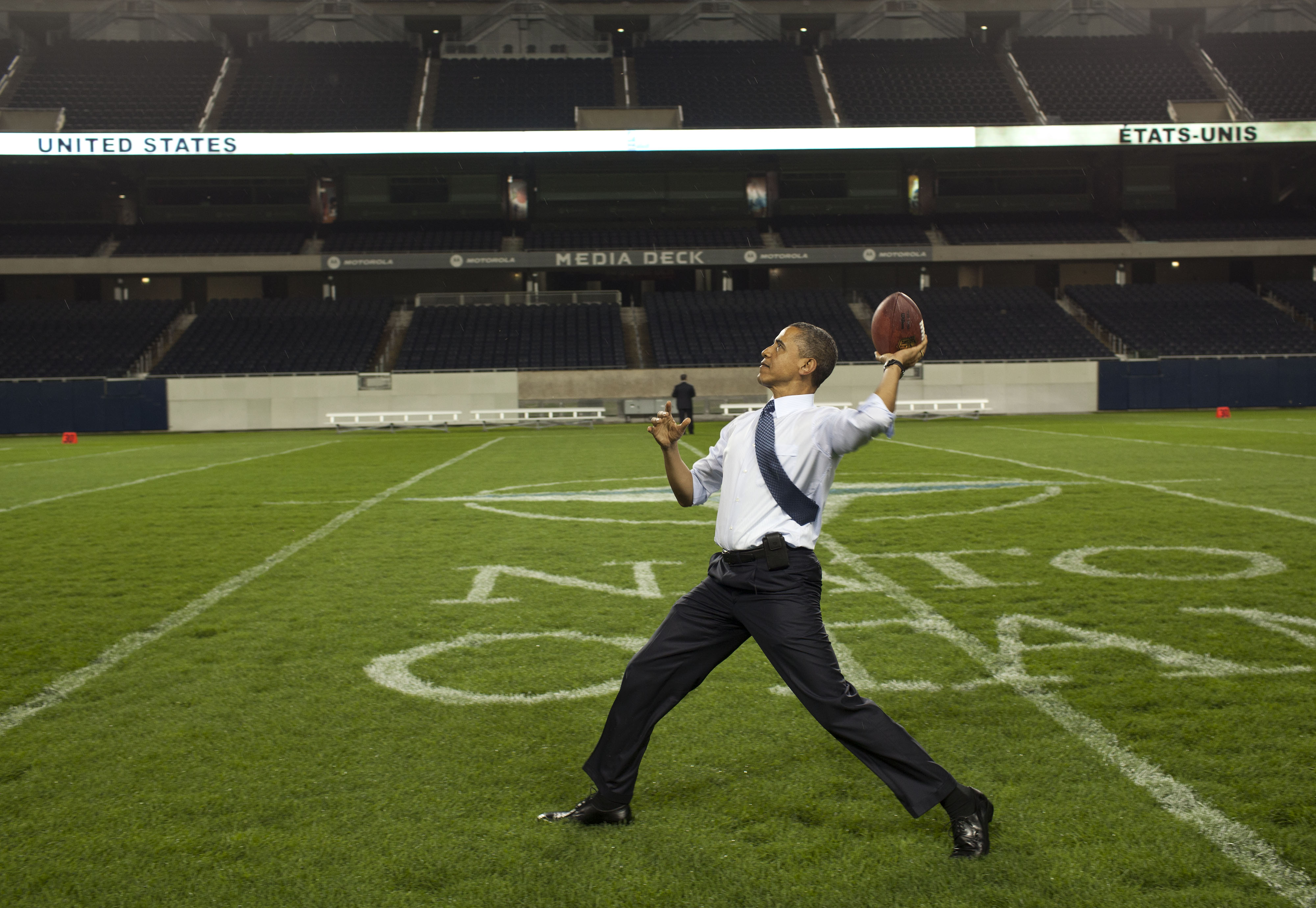
President Barack Obama throws a football at Soldier Field after the 2012 Chicago Summit.

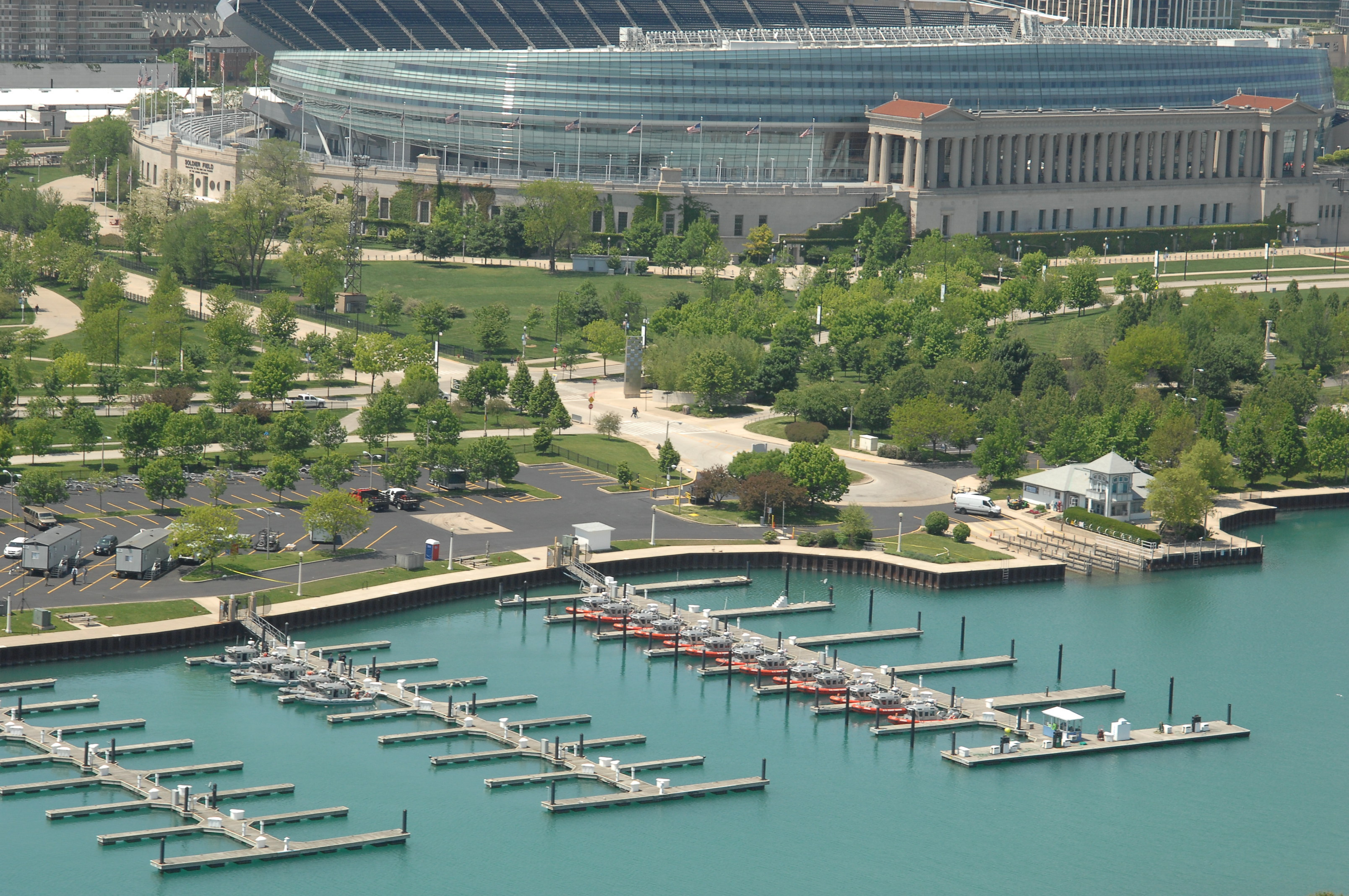
Soldier Field during the 2012 Chicago Summit with Coast Guard boats stationed at nearby Burnham Harbor

- May 2012, United States President Barack Obama held a NATO summit (the 2012 Chicago Summit) at Soldier Field. Chicago was also supposed to host the 38th G8 summit just prior to the NATO summit, but on May 5, 2010, the White House announced a last-minute venue change for the G8 Summit. The G8 Summit was instead held at Camp David.
- June 16 and 17 the first annual Spring Awakening Music Festival was held at Soldier Field. It has been held at Soldier Field every year since. The lineup featured Moby, Skrillex, Afrojack, Diplo, Flux Pavilion, Laidback Luke, Wolfgang Gartner, A-Trak, Ferry Corsten, Markus Schulz, Hardwell, Arty, Claude Vonstroke, Derrick Carter, Dillon Francis, Destructo, Downlink, Felix Cartal, Gabriel & Dresden, Curtis Jones (as 'Green Velvet'), Joachim Garraud, Kill the Noise, Lance Herbstrong, Midnight Conspiracy, Morgan Page, Nathan Scott, Nervo, and Nobody Beats the Drum.
- July 7 a sold-out crowd of 51,100 attended a Kenny Chesney and Tim McGraw Brothers of the Sun Tour concert with Jake Owen and Grace Potter and the Nocturnals.
- August 2 Soldier Field hosted the Terrapin 5K & Music Festival.
- September 1 NIU hosted the Iowa Hawkeyes in a season opener that was called "Soldier Field Showdown III".
- October 6 Notre Dame hosted a game at Soldier Field against the University of Miami as part of their Shamrock Series.
- Simeon defeated Brother Rice 14–12 in the 2012 Prep Bowl.

=== 2013 ===
- February 17: Notre Dame and Miami of Ohio as well as Wisconsin and Minnesota played a collegiate hockey double-header at Soldier Field for the OfficeMax Hockey City Classic. The Notre Dame-Miami game was the first outdoor hockey game in the history of the stadium. The Hockey City Classic is run by Chicago-based Intersport. Participants in the 2013 edition included several future NHL players, such as Notre Dame's Anders Lee, Wisconsin's Jake McCabe, and Minnesota's Nate Schmidt, Nick Bjugstad, and Erik Haula.

League	Home team	Score	Visiting team	Attendance
CCHA	Notre Dame Fighting Irish	2–1	Miami Redhawks	52,051
WCHA	Wisconsin Badgers	3–2	Minnesota Golden Gophers	52,051

- A Chicago Gay Hockey Association intra-squad game was held in affiliation with the Hockey City Classic in 2013.
- July 2013: Big Ten 10k.
- July 7: 25,000 spectators attended a Messi and Friends vs. the World charity association football match. Alongside Lionel Messi, the event featured Carlos Bocanegra, Florent Malouda, Alex Song, Dani Osvaldo, Thierry Henry, and others. Players including Cesc Fàbregas, Giovani dos Santos, David Luiz, Robert Lewandowski, Sergio Agüero and Kevin-Prince Boateng were originally scheduled to participate in the match, but all were ultimately unable to. Messi's all-star team defeated the "World" team 9–6.
- July 12: a sold-out crowd of 45,178 attended a Bon Jovi Because We Can concert, with the J. Geils Band.

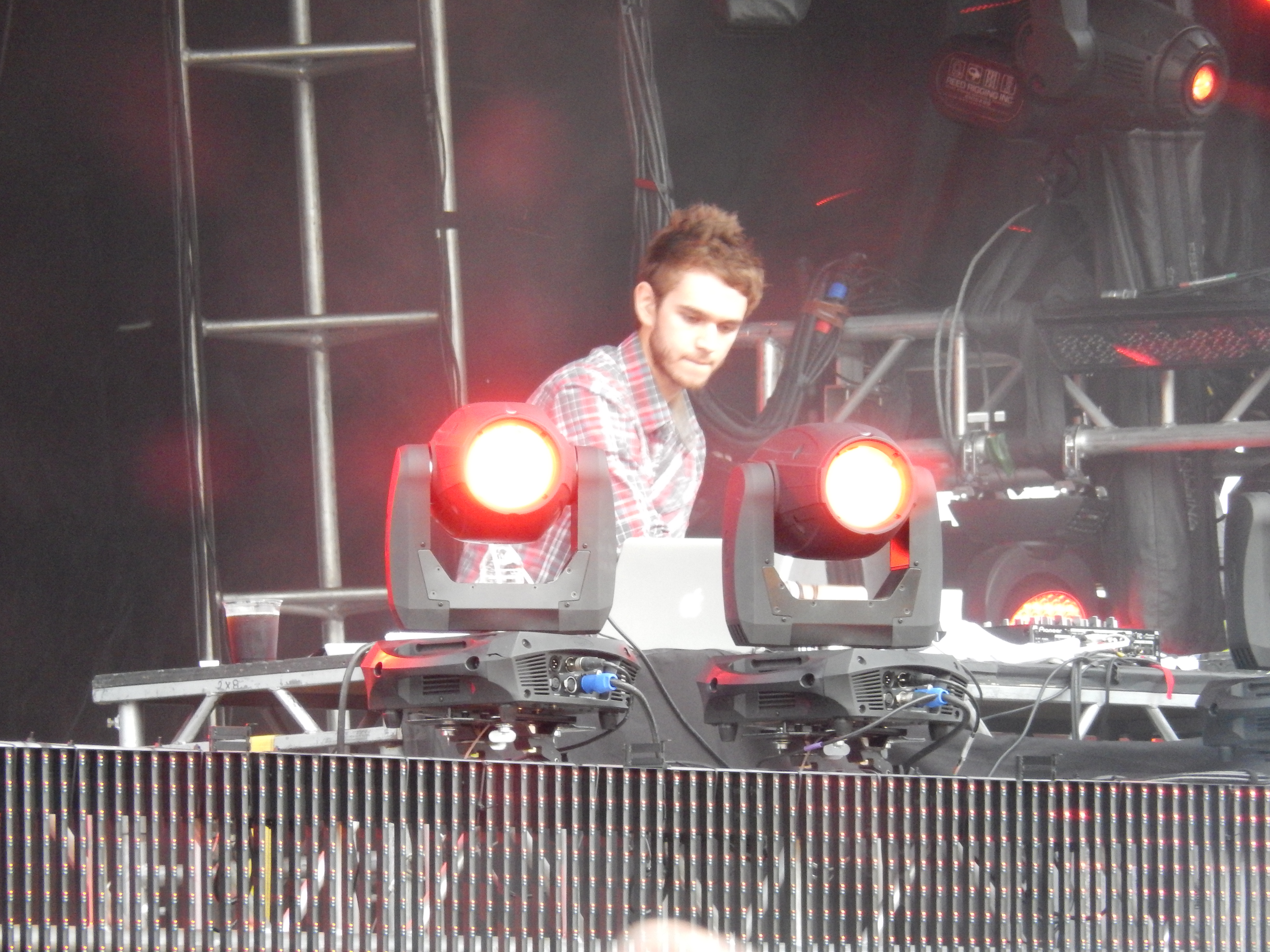
Zedd at the 2013 edition of Spring Awakening

- June 14–16: Soldier Field hosted the Spring Awakening Music Festival. The lineup featured Moby, Calvin Harris, Zeds, Bassnectar, Zeds Dead, 12th Planet, an21 & Max Vangeli, ATB, Bingo Players, Boys Noize, Break Science, Carnage, The Crystal Method, Chuckie, Clockwork, Dirty South, DotExe, Excision, Felix Da Housecat, Figure, Flosstradamus, DJ Godfather, Gramatik, DJ Green Lantern, Curtis Jones (as 'Green Velvet'), Joachim Garruad, John Dahlbäck, Knuckle Children, Krewella, Lucky Date, Milk N Cookies, DJ Minnesota, Mord Fustang, Nathan Scott, Nero, Nervo, Nicky Romero, PANTyRAID, Paul Oakenfold, Porn and Chicken, Porter Robinson, R3hab, Robbie Rivera, Savoy, Showtek, Stafford Brothers, Stratus, Team Bayside High, Tommy Trash, Topher Jones, Walden, Wolfgang Gartner, 2EBO, and Zomboy.
- July 22: a sold-out crowd of 52,671 attended a JAY Z and Justin Timberlake Legends of the Summer concert, with DJ Cassidy.
- 2013 CONCACAF Gold Cup

Date	Team #1	Res.	Team #2	Round	Spectators
July 28, 2013	United States	1–0	Panama	Final	57,920

- August 2013: Soldier Field hosted the Chicago Match Cup.
- August 8: Terrapin 5K & Music Festival

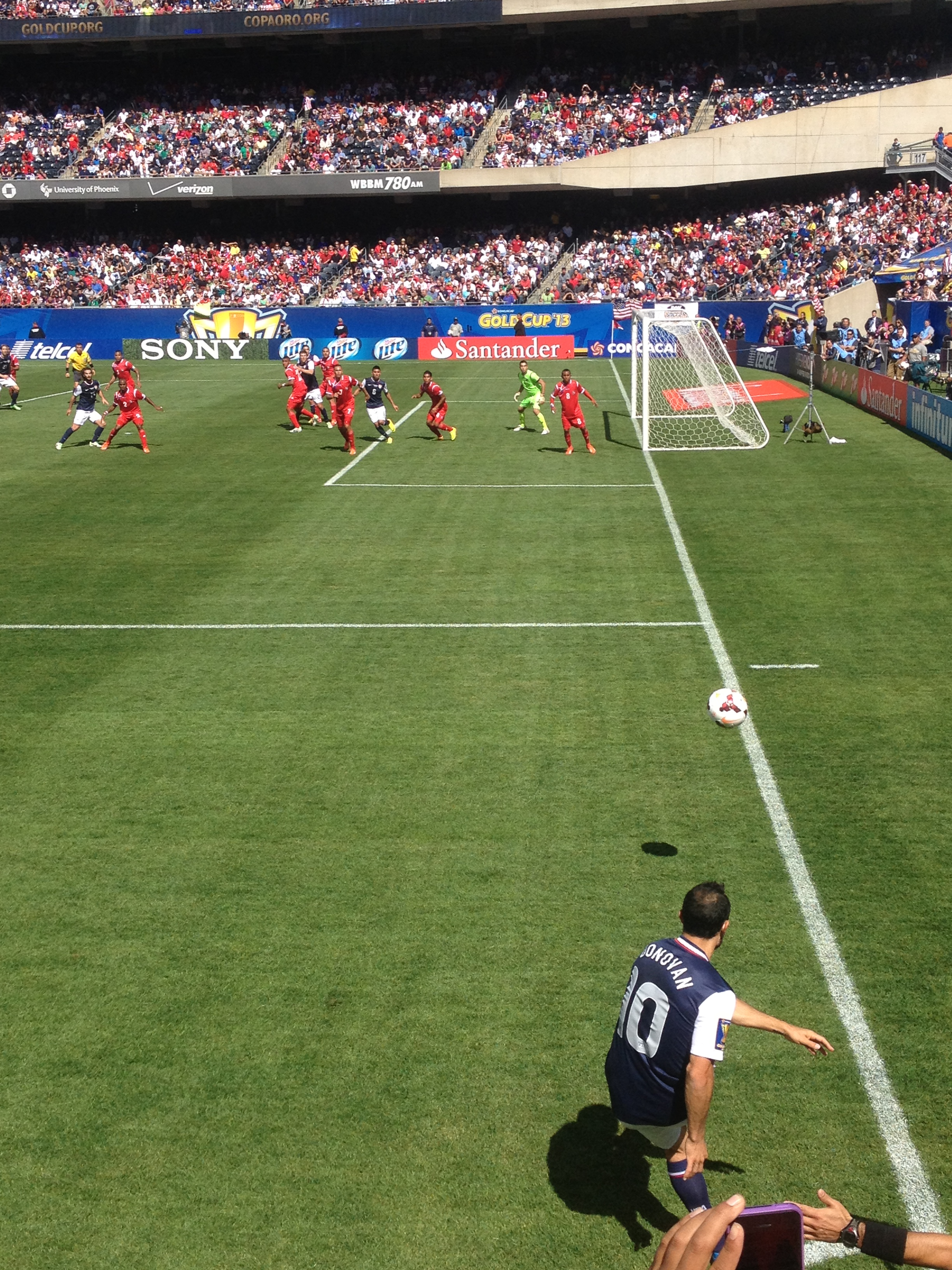
Landon Donovan competing on the US team during the 2013 CONCACAF Gold Cup Final

- August 10: a sold-out crowd of 50,809 attended a Taylor Swift The Red Tour concert, with Ed Sheeran, Casey James and Austin Mahone.
- August 31: NAIA collegiate football game between the Robert Morris Eagles and the Ave Maria Gyrenes.
- September 14: 47,312 attended an Illinois vs Washington football game. Washington won 34–24.
- Saint Rita defeated Simeon 35–20 in the 2013 Prep Bowl.

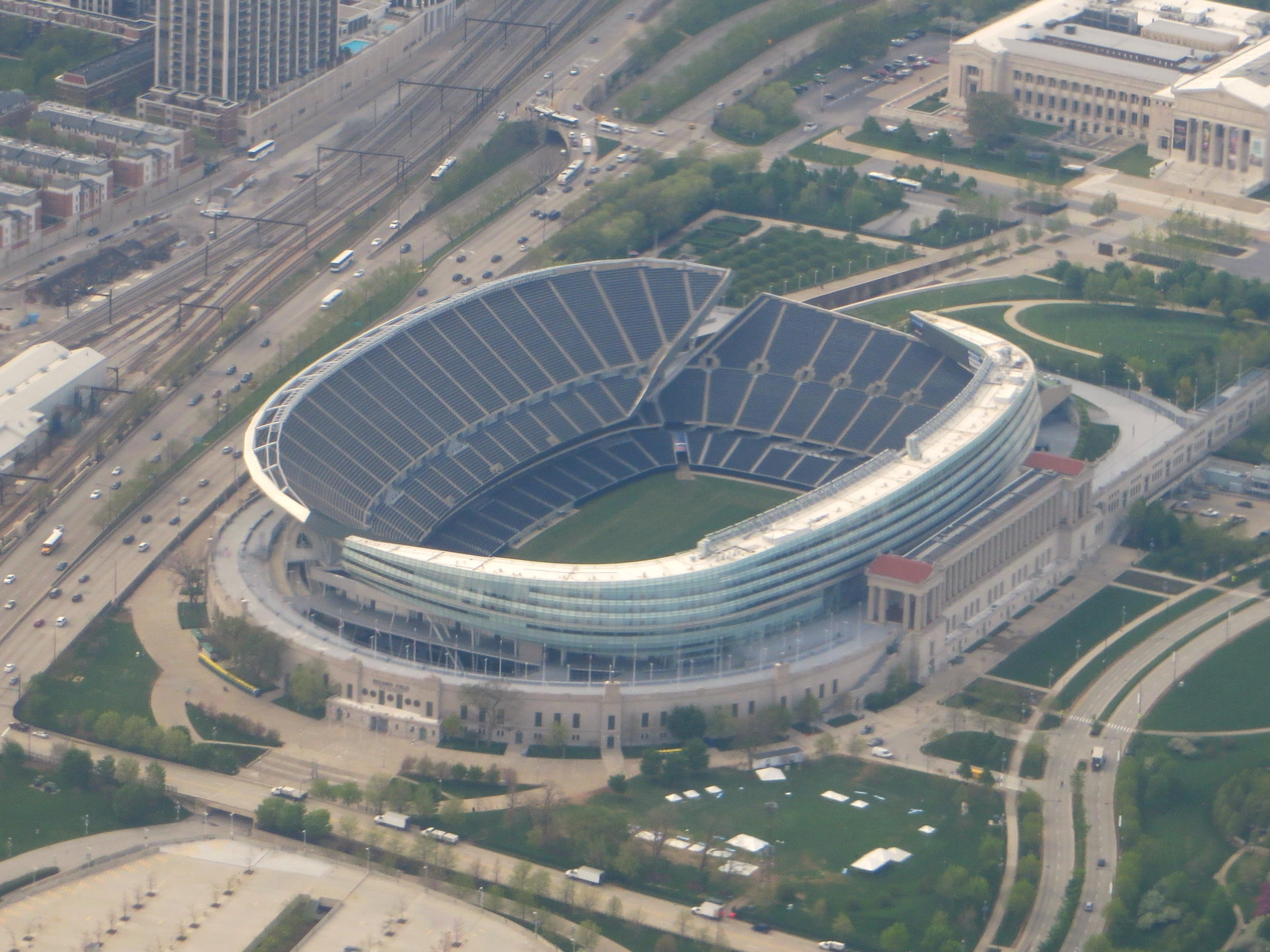
Soldier Field in 2014

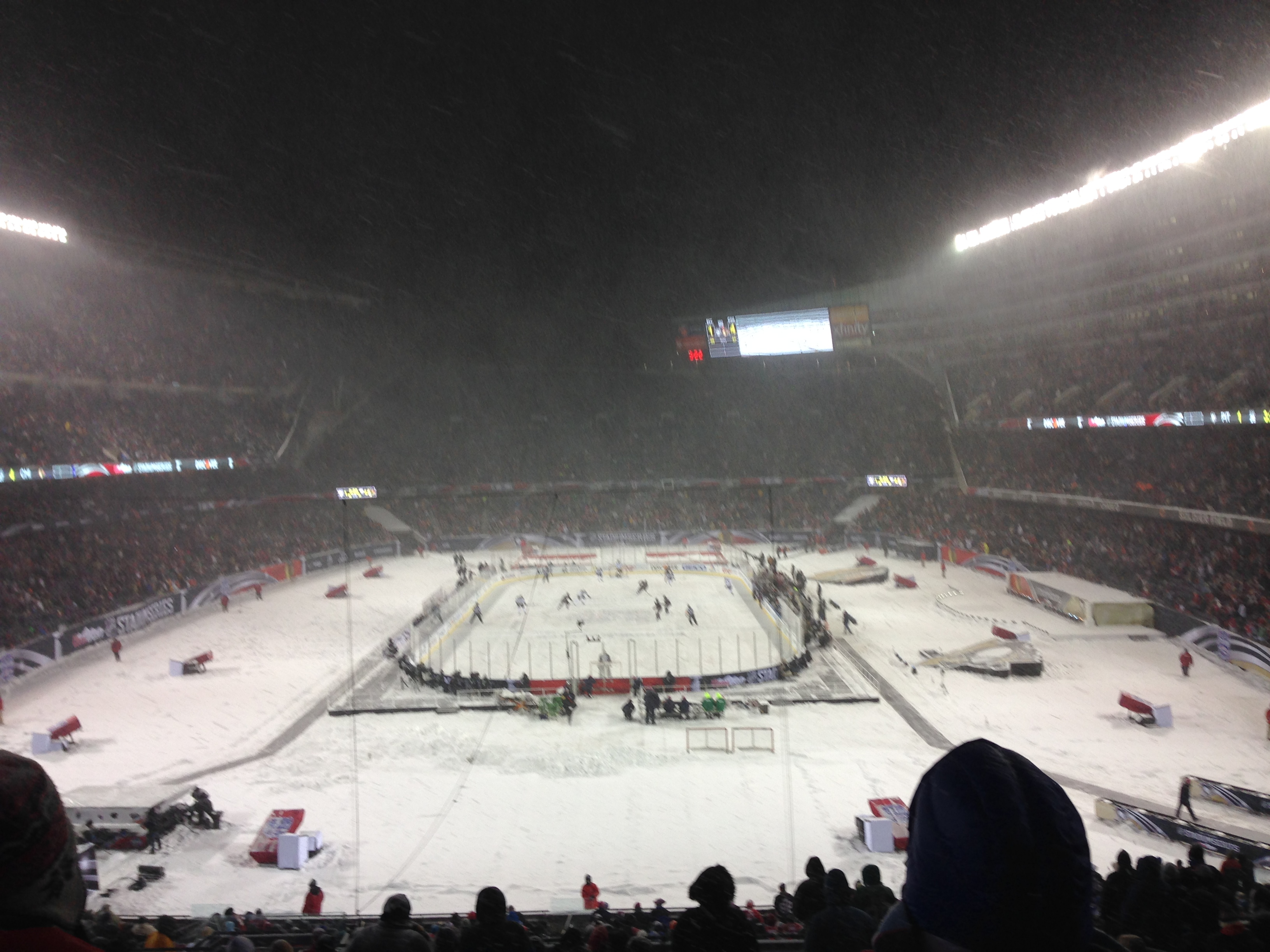
The 2014 NHL Stadium Series featuring the Chicago Blackhawks and Pittsburgh Penguins

=== 2014 ===
- March 1: the Chicago Blackhawks played against the Pittsburgh Penguins as part of the 2014 NHL Stadium Series. The Blackhawks defeated the Penguins 5–1 before a sold-out crowd of 62,921.
- June 13–15: Soldier Field hosted the Spring Awakening Music Festival. The lineup featured Tiesto, Diplo, Kaskade, Knife & Party, Pretty Lights, Big Gigantic, Benny Benassi, Dillon Francis, Eric Prydz, Flux Pavilion, Steve Aoki, A-Trak, Kill The Noise, Claude Vonstroke, Curtis Jones (as 'Green Velvet'), Borgore, Chuckie, 3lau, Alex Metric, Alvin Risk, Andy C, Arty, Blasterjaxx, Caked Up, Candyland, Carnage, Datsik, Derrick Carter, Destroid, DVBBS, Dyro, Feed Me, Ferry Corsten, Gladiator, Gregori Klosman, Kap Slap, Kill Paris, Laidback Luke, Manic Focus, Markus Schulz, Midnight Consipracy, Nick Catchdubs, Nervo, Oliver Ookay, Paper Diamond, Pete Tong, Sander van Doorn, Sandro Silva, DJ Snake, Thomas Gold, and Tommy Trash.
- June 27–29: 2014 Soldier Field served as a landmark along the route of the Chicago installment of the 2014 ITU World Triathlon Series.
- July 1: 28,000 attended a viewing party of the broadcast 2014 World Cup Round of 16 game between the United States and Belgium. In attendance at this viewing party was Chicago Mayor Rahm Emanuel.
- July 24: a sold-out crowd of 50,035 attended a Beyoncé and Jay Z On the Run Tour concert. The performance earned $5,783,396 in ticket revenue.
- July 27: 2014 International Champions Cup match:

Date	Time	Team #1	Res.	Team #2	Spectators
July 27, 2014	17:00 (CDT)	Liverpool	1–0	Olympiacos	36,17

- August 29 and 30: two sold-out crowds totalling 104,617 attended One Direction Where We Are Tour concerts with 5 Seconds of Summer.
- August 31: a sold-out crowd of 50,529 attended a Luke Bryan That's My Kind of Night Tour concert with Dierks Bentley, Lee Brice, Cole Swindell, and DJ Rock. The show grossed $3,754,362. This concert broke the record the highest-attended country music concert at Soldier Field.
- September 20: Soldier Field hosted the Annual Chicago Football Classic, which was played between Morehouse College and Central State University. Morehouse won 43–9. The halftime show featured Tone Kapone and Shag from Power 92, WGCI-FM personality Leon Rogers, and Spenzo who performed his song Wife Er along with a new song. Spenzo was joined by Diggy Simmons, son of Run DMC member Joseph "Rev Run" Simmons. The halftime show ended with a battle of the bands between the Morehouse and Central State marching bands.
- November 1, 2014: Soldier Field hosted its first international rugby union test match between the United States and New Zealand as part of the 2014 end-of-year rugby union tests. More than half of the 61,500 tickets were sold within two days. The attendance was a capacity crowd of 61,500. This set the record for the most attended international rugby test held in the United States, surpassing the previous record by over 40,000. The All Blacks beat the USA Eagles 76–6.
- Loyola defeated Curie 14-7 in the 2014 Prep Bowl.

=== 2015 ===
- February 5 the organizers of the 2015 Coyote Logistics Hockey City Classic launched a 12-day winter festival at Soldier Field with a Unite on the Ice event benefiting St. Jude Children's Research Hospital. The event included a celebrity hockey game with former NHL and AHL players, as well as a public free skate at Soldier Field. Participants in the celebrity game included Éric Dazé, Jamal Mayers and Gino Cavallini. Denis Savard was in attendance, serving as an 'honorary coach' during the game.
- February 7 Soldier Field hosted the 2015 Hockey City Classic, the second edition of the game to be held at Soldier Field. The games of the 2015 Coyote Logistics Hockey City Classic had to be delayed due to unusually warm weather (42 °F) and complications with the quality of the ice. The 2015 edition of the Hockey City Classic featured a match between Miami of Ohio and Western Michigan, followed by a match between the Big Ten's Michigan and Michigan State. Due largely to the delay and other factors, attendance was a disappointing 22,751.

League	Home team	Score	Visiting team	Attendance
NCHC	Miami Redhawks	4–3	Western Michigan	22,751
Big 10	Wisconsin Badgers	3–2	Minnesota Golden Gophers	22,751

- February 15, 2015 Soldier Field hosted a Chicago Gay Hockey Association intra-league match in association with the Hockey City Classic at Soldier Field.
- April 6 BT5K Chicago Breakthrough for Brain Tumors Run & Walk to benefit the American Brain Tumor Association.
- May 9 American Beer Classic beer festival (Chicago's largest) inside Soldier Field.
- May 9 Cinco de Miler 5 mile race on the Chicago lakefront starting and finishing in Soldier Field's South Tailgate Lot.
- June 6 Kenny Chesney The Big Revival Tour concert with Miranda Lambert, Brantley Gilbert, Chase Rice, and Old Dominion. 43,630 spectators attended the show, which generated $3,776,207 in ticket-revenue.

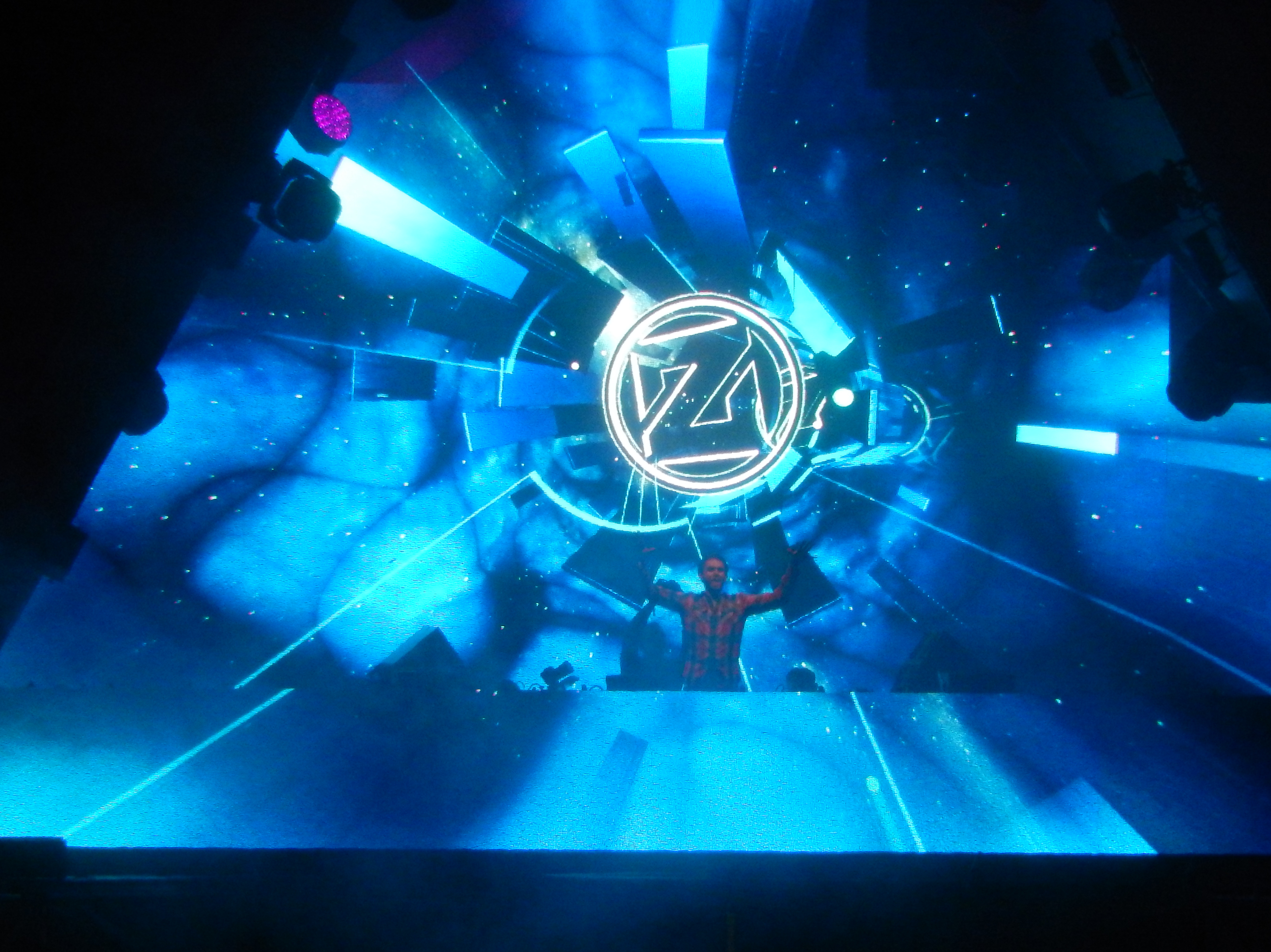
Zedd at the 2015 edition of Spring Awakening

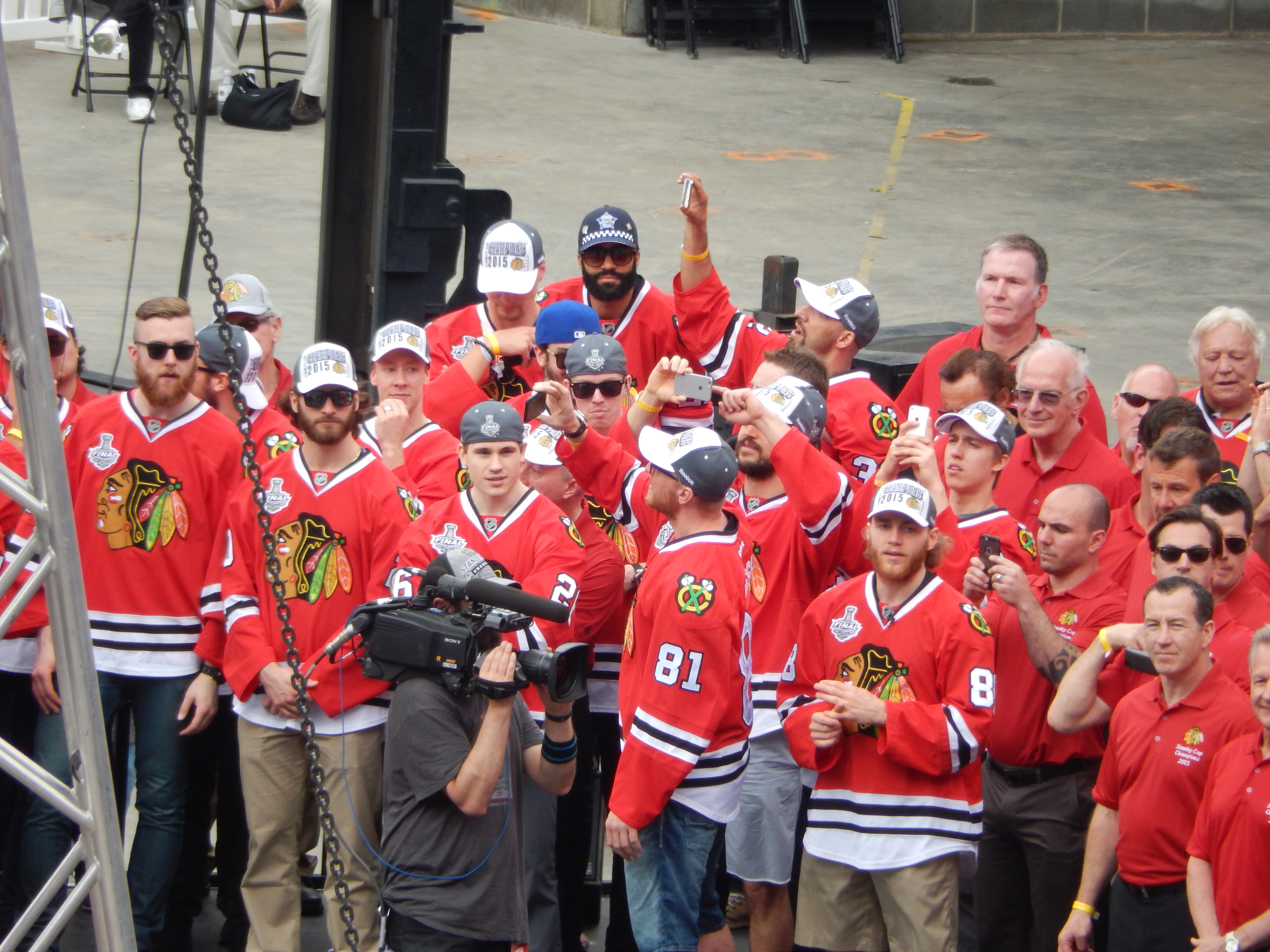
Players at the 2015 Blackhawks victory rally

- June 12–14 Soldier Field hosted the Spring Awakening Music Festival.

The first day (the 12th) featured Zedd, Eric Prydz, Martin Garrix, Duke Dumont, Paul van Dyk, Andrew Rayel, Borgore, Cosmic Gate, DJ Slink, Ilan Bluestone, Mija, Myon & Shane 54, Seven Lions, Shiba San, Slander the Floozies, Thomas Jack, Tommy Trash, A Guy Called Amir, Dani Deahl, Freak Island, Jake Terra, Kite!, Louis the Child, Mario Florek, M.O.B., Peter Kontor, PT & PT, Skyler Shores, Sleepy Pilch, and The Trap House.

The second day (the 13th) featured Hardwell, Flosstradamus, Dada Life, Zomboy, Diplo (performing both solo and alongside Skrillex as they made their midwest debut as Jack Ü), Adventure Club, Brillz, Bro Safari, Dusky, Eats Everything, Figure, Grandtheft, Headhunterz, Lane 8, Morgan Page, Nicole Moudaber, Oliver Heldens, Pegboard Nerds, Sander van Doorn, Savoy, Skream, Ummet Ozcan, Alfonz Delamota, Attak, Bucky Fargo, DJ White Owl, Fatboy, Inphinity, Kalendr, Jack Trash, Porn and Chicken, RJ Pickens, Ryan B, Stratus, Teknicolor, Xonic, and Zander.

The final day (the 14th) featured Tiësto, Afrojack, Zeds Dead, Excision, Jamie Jones, Aero Chord, Audien, Boombox, Branchez, Curtis Jones (as 'Cajmere'), Derrick Carter, DVBBS, Eva Shaw, Hucci, Justin Martin, Keys N Krates, MK, Party Favor, TJR, W&W, Yellow Claw, Antics, Delusive, DJ Nurotic, Funky Mack, Goodsex, Howie Doin, Juno Moss, Light.Em.Up, Mikho, Nathan Scott, Soultech (performing alongside Gene Ferris and Dustin Sheridan), The Pool House, Xposur, and Zerogravity.

- June 18 65,000 attended the Chicago Blackhawks 2015 Stanley Cup victory rally at Soldier Field.
- June 27 Kam Franklin and her band The Suffers performed and Eugene Mirman served as the host on the main stage of Woofstock: Road to the Puppy Bowl, a charity event held a Soldier Field. Other performers included JC Brooks & the Uptown Sound and Clap Your Hands Say Yeah.
- June 29, as part of the 2015 International Champions Cup, Manchester United played Paris Saint-Germain at Soldier Field.
July 29, 2015
20:00 CDT

Manchester United (England)	0–2	(France) Paris Saint-Germain
		Matuidi 25'; Ibrahimović 34'

Soldier Field, Chicago
Attendance: 61,351
Referee: Alan Kelly (Republic of Ireland)
Soldier Field during Fare Thee Well
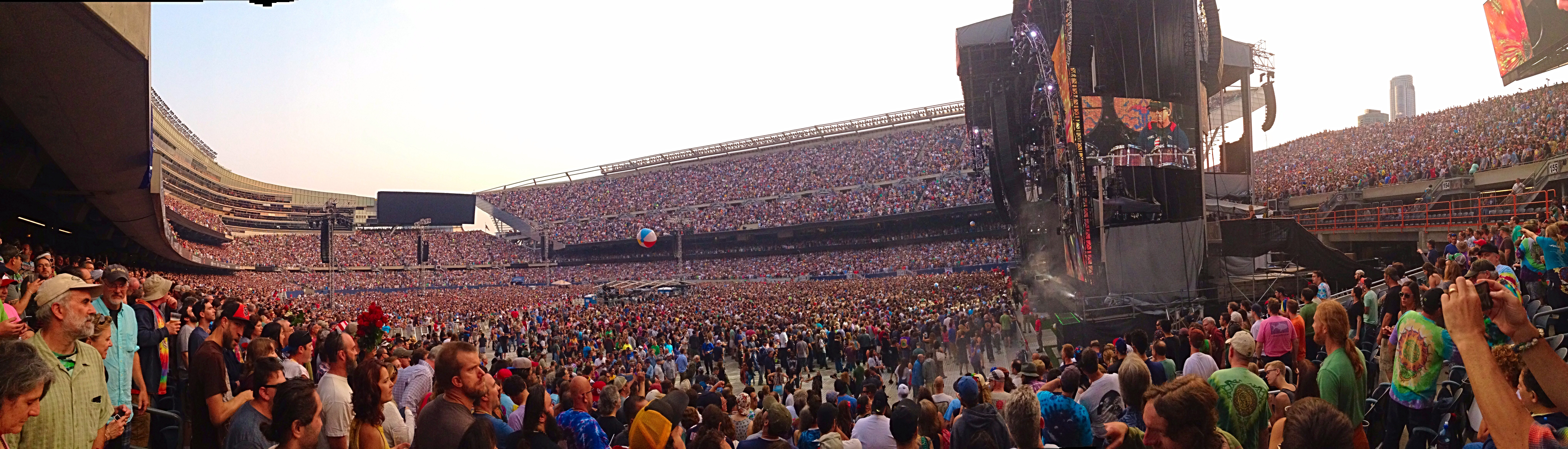
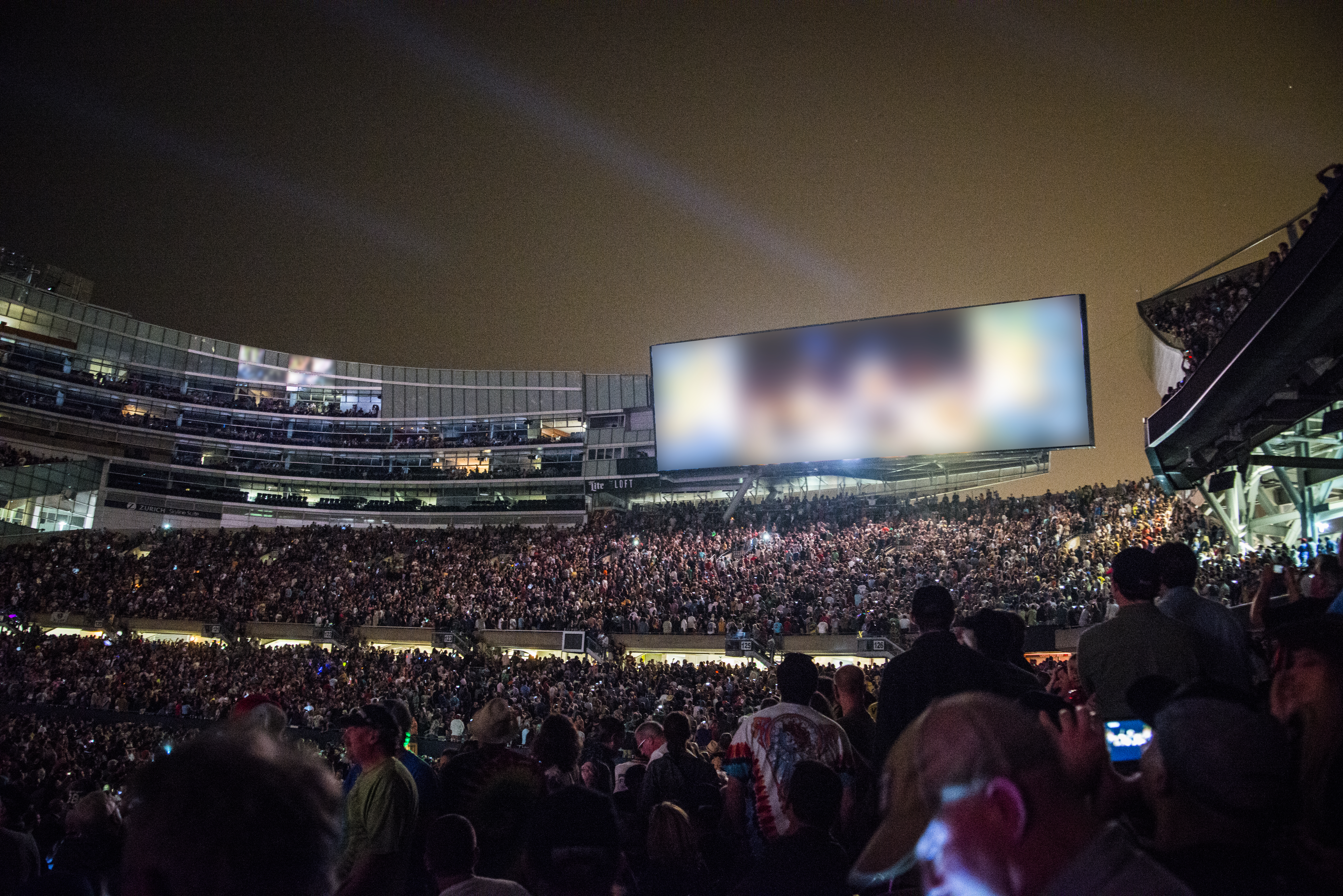
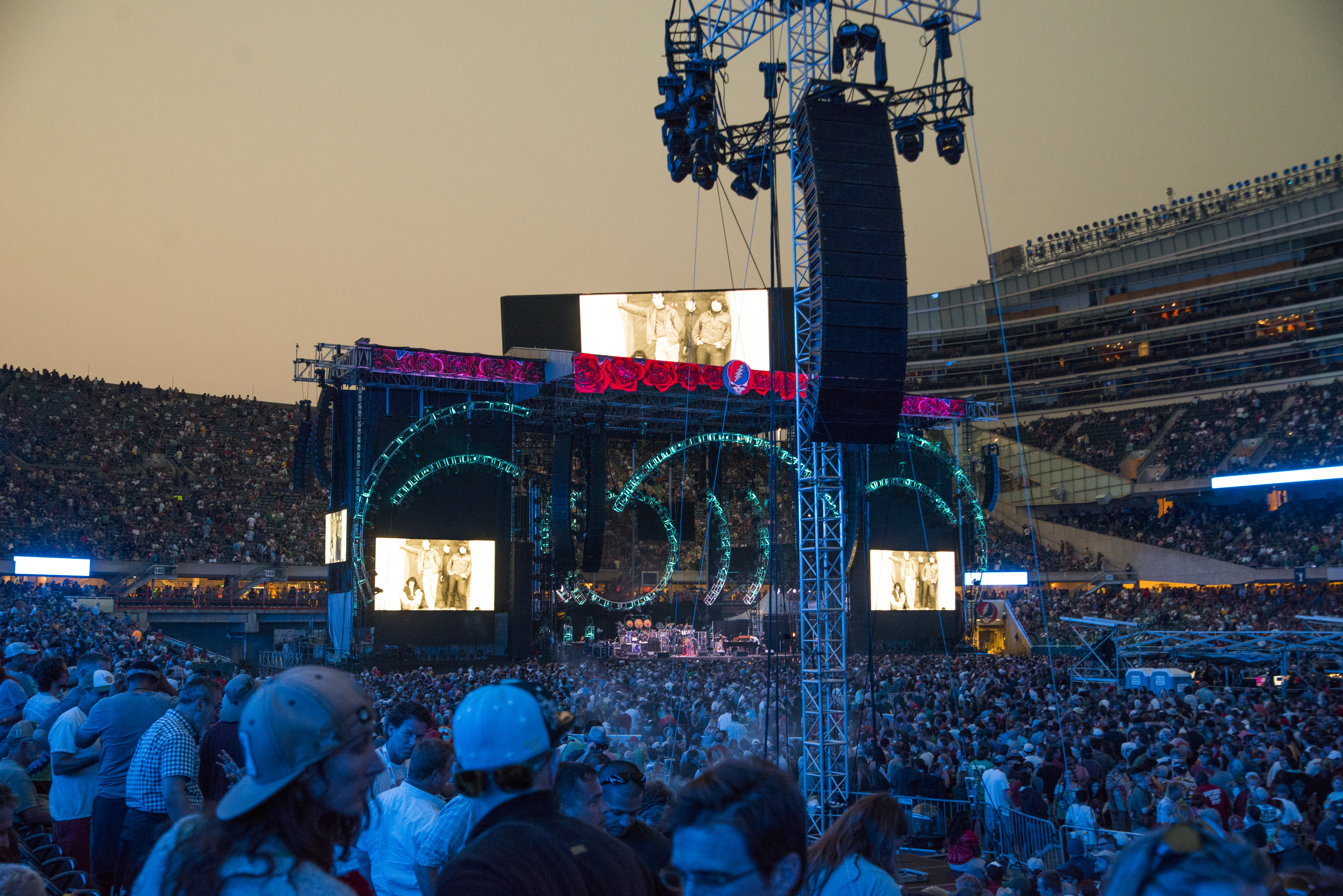
- July 3–5, 2015 the Grateful Dead performed a series of three reunion concerts at Soldier Field celebrating the band's 50th anniversary. This was a portion of a concert series entitled "Fare Thee Well: Celebrating 50 Years of the Grateful Dead", which were their first concerts since their July 1995 concert at Soldier Field. The three concerts at Soldier Field were originally to be their only concerts, but due to overwhelming ticket demand the series was expanded to include two dates at Levi's Stadium in Santa Clara, California (in the San Francisco Bay Area) performed the weekend prior to the Soldier Field concerts. The band at the concerts consisted of the surviving Grateful Dead members Bob Weir, Phil Lesh, Bill Kreutzmann and Mickey Hart, who had no performed together since the Dead's 2009 tour, who were joined by Trey Anastasio, Bruce Hornsby and Jeff Chimenti. The concerts at Soldier Field were also broadcast with a live simulcast seen by hundreds of thousands on pay-per-view cable television, (for free) on YouTube, on large screens at multiple concert venues in the United States, in movie theaters, as well as in various pay-per-view services. Sirius Satellite Radio played the concerts, with a slight delay, on their Grateful Dead channel. The pay-per-view set a new record for a music event with more than 400,000 subscriptions, surpassing a 1999 simulcast by the Backstreet Boys which drew 160,000 subscriptions. The concerts at Soldier Field were documented by director Martin Scorsese for a film. Recordings from the concert will be released as a live album on November 20, 2015. There will be three different versions of the recording. Each concert was attended by over 70,000 (more than 210,000 overall). The first date drew 70,764, setting a new record for attendance at Soldier Field post-renovation, a record that was surpassed the next night when 70,844 attended the second concert. Among those in attendance were Bill Murray, George R. R. Martin, Katy Perry and John Mayer, Al Franken, Perry Farrell, Bill Walton, Jenny Lewis, John Popper, Chloë Sevigny, Liz Phair, David Axelrod, and Sonic Youth's Lee Ranaldo.
- 2015 CONCACAF Gold Cup matches:

Date	Time (CDT)	Team #1	Res.	Team #2	Round	Spectators
July 9, 2015	19:00 (18:00 CDT)	Mexico	6-0	Cuba	Group C	54,126
July 9, 2015	21:30 (20:30 CDT)	Trinidad and Tobago	3-1	Cuba	Group C	54,126

- July 18 and 19 Taylor Swift The 1989 World Tour concerts with Vance Joy, Shawn Mendes, and HAIM. These shows were sold out, with 55,431 and 54,445 being purchased for the first and the second shows respectively. This is believed to have set Soldier Field's record for a concert independently headlined by a female artist. During the first concert, Swift invited Andy Grammer and Serayah to join her onstage. She invited Sam Hunt, Andreja Pejić and Lily Donaldson onstage during her second show. The sold-out shows were opened by Vance Joy, Shawn Mendes, and Haim, and generated $11,469,887 in revenue.
- July 25 2015 BTN Big 10k.
- August 23 a sold-out crowd of 41,527 attended a One Direction On the Road Again Tour concert with Icona Pop. The show generated $3,382,655 in ticket revenue.
- August 28 Chicago's St. Rita of Cascia High School played Pennsylvania's Malvern Preparatory School at Soldier Field as part of the High School Kick Off Classic. Other games that were a part of this included one between Mount Carmel High School and Marist High School, which Mount Carmel won 21–14.
- September 5 23,000 spectators watched the Australian Wallabies defeat the US Eagles 49-10 in Soldier Field's second-ever international rugby match.
- September 10 2015 Super Bears Shuffle 5K race.
- September 13 Jim Cornelison, the Chicago Blackhawks' National Anthem singer, sang the US National Anthem before a game between the Chicago Bears and their longtime–rival Green Bay Packers.
- September 28 the Morgan State Bears faced Howard Bisons in the Chicago Football Classic.
- October 4 several members of the Chicago Blackhawks, including Jonathan Toews and Patrick Kane, appeared at a Chicago Bears game with the Stanley Cup.
- November 11 Mayor of Chicago Rahm Emanuel oversaw the annual Veterans Day ceremony at Soldier Field. Captain William Albracht, a Purple Heart recipient who was the youngest captain of combat troops in the Vietnam War, served as the event's keynote speaker. Also taking part in the ceremony were Representative Tammy Duckworth (a Purple Heart recipient herself), Senator Mark Kirk (a decorated veteran himself), Senator Dick Durbin, and Governor Bruce Rauner.
- November 28 Soldier Field hosted the annual Land of Lincoln Trophy rivalry game between Northwestern and Illinois. This was the first time in the 123-year rivalry between the two school's that they have ever met at Soldier Field, and the third time that they played one another in Chicago (the previous two times being at Wrigley Field in 1923 and in 2010). Northwestern won the game 24–14.

=== 2016 ===
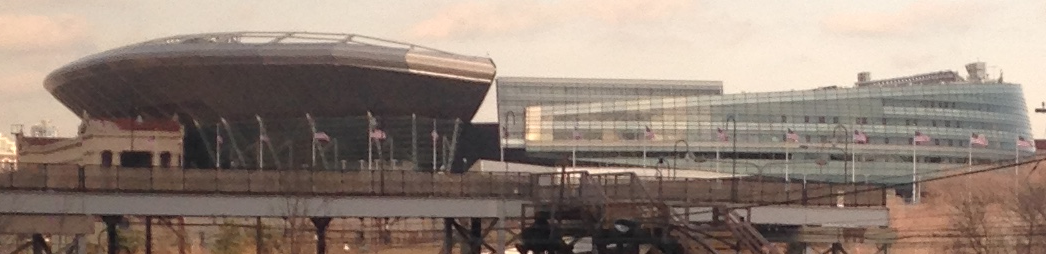
Soldier Field in 2016

- May 27 and 28 Beyoncé Formation World Tour concerts.
- In June, Soldier Field hosted matches of the Copa América Centenario. This was the 100th anniversary edition of the Copa América, and the first time it had been held outside of South America. The Copa América is the oldest continental football competition and is one of the most prestigious and most widely viewed sporting events in the world.

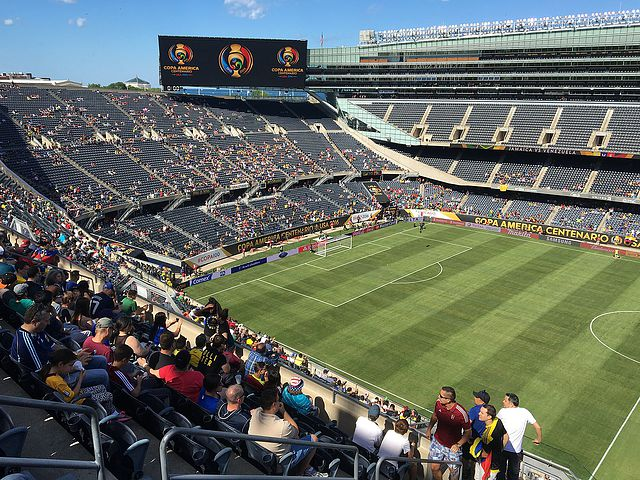
Soldier Field hosting the Copa América Centenario Group C Venezuela-Jamaica match

Date	Team #1	Result	Team #2	Attendance	Round
June 5	Jamaica	0-1	Venezuela	25,560	Group C
June 7	United States	4-0	Costa Rica	39,642	Group A
June 10	Argentina	5-0	Panama	53,885	Group D
June 22	Colombia	0-2	Chile	55,423	Semi-finals

- July 1 and 3 Guns N' Roses Alice in Chains Not in This Lifetime... Tour concerts
- July 23 and 24 Coldplay A Head Full of Dreams Tour concerts with Alessia Cara and Foxes
- November 5 the New Zealand All Blacks faced Ireland in Soldier Field's third-ever international rugby match. This was the first time the two teams have faced one another in the United States. Ireland won the match 40-29, marking the first time they have ever defeated the All Blacks in International Test rugby. This game was part of "The Rugby Weekend", which also featured a game between the US Eagles and the Maori All Blacks at Toyota Park one day earlier. The Maori All Blacks won the match 52–7.

=== 2017 ===
- June 3 and 4 U2 The Joshua Tree Tour 2017 concert with the Lumineers.
- June 18 Metallica WorldWired Tour concert.
- 2017 Warrior Games opening ceremony on July 1, 2017 (field competitions held in the adhacent parkland)
- 2017 Major League Soccer All-Star Game on August 2, 2017
- Coldplay returned to Soldier Field on August 17, 2017, for their A Head Full of Dreams Tour.
- In 2017 Soldier Field hosted the annual Land of Lincoln Trophy rivalry game between Northwestern and Illinois.

=== 2018 ===
- January 6: 2018 NFC Wild Card: Philadelphia Eagles 16, Chicago Bears 15
- August 10 & 11: Beyoncé & Jay-Z On The Run II Concert.

=== 2019 ===
- In 2019 Soldier Field will host the annual Land of Lincoln Trophy rivalry game between Northwestern and Illinois.
- 2019 CONCACAF Gold Cup Final on 7 July.

== 2020s ==
=== 2021 ===
- In 2021 Kanye West Performed his third concert of the Donda Listening Party series
- In 2021 Soldier Field hosted Notre Dame vs. Wisconsin.

=== 2023 ===
- June 2, 3 and 4: Taylor Swift performed 3 sold out concerts during The Eras Tour
- July 22 and 23: Beyoncé performed to 2 sold out crowds during Renaissance World Tour

=== 2024 ===
- June 21: Billy Joel and Stevie Nicks performed a concert together branded as "two legends, one night"

=== 2025 ===
- May 15, 17, and 18: Beyoncé brings the Cowboy Carter Tour to Soldier Field
- July 18: Blackpink performs the Deadline Tour to Soldier Field

=== 2026 ===
- March 31: Mexico vs Belgium. first football (soccer in US) match in Mexico's MexTour 2026.

== See also ==
- Motorsport at Soldier Field
- List of events at Wrigley Field
