= List of festivals in Chicago =

This is a list of festivals in Chicago, Illinois, United States.

== Architecture ==
- Open House Chicago, October
- Chicago Architecture Biennial

== Arts and crafts ==
- 57th Street Art Fair, Hyde Park, June
- Chicago Art Book Fair, November
- Chicago Artists Month, September/October
- Gold Coast Art Fair, Grant Park, June
- Manifest, Columbia College Chicago, May
- SOFA Chicago, Navy Pier, October/November (last held 2022)
- Wells Street Art Festival, Old Town, June

== Community festivals and celebrations ==
- Andersonville City Made Fest, Andersonville, September
- Fulton Fest, Near West Side, September
- Northalsted Market Days, Boystown, August
- Ribfest Chicago, North Center, June
- Six Corners BBQ Fest, Six Corners, Portage Park, June

== Culture, heritage and folk ==
- African Festival of the Arts
- American Spanish Dance and Music Festival
- Celtic Fest Chicago
- Chicago Humanities Festival
- Fiesta Del Sol Pilsen
- Lebanese Food Festival
- Midwest Buddhist Temple Ginza Holiday Festival
- Printers Row Lit Fest, September
- Venetian Night, August
- Von Steuben Day (Ferris Bueller's Day Off)

== Fiction and fantasy ==
- Capricon
- Chicago Comic & Entertainment Expo
- Windycon
- Wizard World Chicago

== Film ==
- Chicago Feminist Film Festival
- Chicago International Children's Film Festival
- Chicago International Documentary Film Festival
- Chicago International Film Festival
- Chicago International REEL Shorts Festival
- Chicago Latino Film Festival
- Chicago Outdoor Film Festival
- Chicago Palestine Film Festival
- Chicago Underground Film Festival
- Juggernaut: A Sci-Fi and Fantasy Film Festival
- Midwest Film Festival
- Midwest Independent Film Festival
- Polish Film Festival in America
- Reeling: The Chicago LGBTQ+ International Film Festival

== Flowers ==
- Botanic Gardens Antiques & Garden Fair
- Chicago Flower and Garden Show

== Food ==
- Chicago Food Truck Festival
- Good Food Festival & Conference
- Ribfest Chicago
- Six Corners BBQ Fest
- Taste of Chicago
- Taste of Polonia
- Taste of Randolph, June

== Holiday ==
- Christkindlmarket
- Clark Street Spooktacular
- Magnificent Mile Lights Festival
- Spooky Zoo Spectacular
- The Way of the Cross Downtown Chicago

== LGBT ==
- Chicago Is a Drag Festival
- Chicago Pride Parade

== Music, theatre and performing arts ==
=== Music ===
- Alehorn of Power
- Chicago Blues Festival
- Chicago Country Fest
- Chicago Flamenco Festival
- Chicago Gospel Music Festival
- Chicago Jazz Festival
- Chicago Maritime Festival
- El Grito Fest
- Estrojam's Decibelle Music and Culture Festival
- The Fest for Beatles Fans
- Grant Park Music Festival
- Hyde Park Jazz Festival
- Lake Shake
- Latino Music Festival
- Lollapalooza
- Mamby on the Beach
- Midwest Clinic
- Midwest Wonderland Music Festival
- Million Tongues Festival
- North Coast Music Festival
- Pilsen Fest
- Pitchfork Music Festival
- Ribfest Chicago
- Riot Fest
- Ruido Fest
- Spring Awakening Music Festival
- Square Roots
- Sueños
- Wicker Park Fest
- World Music Festival Chicago

=== Performing arts ===
- Chicago Fringe Festival
- Chicago Improv Festival
- Chicago Sketch Fest
- Paragon: A Sci-Fi and Fantasy Short Theatre Play Festival
- Windy City Burlesque Festival

== Parades ==
- Bud Billiken Parade and Picnic
- Chicago Columbus Day Parade
- Chicago Pride Parade
- Chicago St. Patrick's Day Parade
- Chinese New Year Parade
- McDonald's Thanksgiving Parade
- Mexican Independence Day Parade
- Northwest Side Irish Parade
- Polish Constitution Day Parade
- Puerto Rican Day Parade

== Sports ==
- Bike The Drive
- Boulevard Lakefront Tour
- Chicago Marathon
- Chicago Yacht Club Race to Mackinac
- Crosstown Classic

== Transportation ==
- Chicago Air & Water Show
- Chicago Auto Show

== Other ==
Edward Marszewski talks about Version Fest.

- Around the Coyote
- Chicago Science Festival
- MDW Fair
- Pier Walk
- Version Fest
- Viva Chicago

== Discontinued festivals ==
- Art Chicago
- Asian Animation Film Festival
- Chicago Railroad Fair
- Chicago Reggae Festival
- ChicagoFest
- Cineme
- Green Apple Music & Arts Festival
- Intonation Music Festival
- Looptopia
