= Terry Plumming =

Chicago avant-garde recording label

The symbol of the Terry Plumming Summit

Terry Plumming was a Chicago based recording label with a focus on experimental and nonsense music. Since 2003, it has released over 30 CD-Rs and two records, showcasing avant-garde music mostly by Chicago artists, including Soft Serve, Bubblegum Shitface, Jonathan Chen, Koutaro Fukui, Rotten Milk, Dan Layne and Death Factory. Terry Plumming also publishes an eponymous magazine that has had a run of several issues beginning in 2003. Each issue comes with a CD-R compilation of locally produced avant-garde music. The creators of the magazine have also produced assorted performance art, "happenings" and installation projects in Chicago.

== See also ==
- Lumpen (magazine)
- Versionfest
- Select Media Festival
