= AAFF =

AAFF may refer to:

- Ann Arbor Film Festival, an annual film festival held in Ann Arbor, US
- Asian Animation Film Festival, a new festival hosted in Chicago
- Architect Africa Film Festival, an annual architectural film festival held in South Africa
- Asociación Nacional de Administradores de fincas de España, the National Association of Administrators of Finance in Spain.
