= Jewelers Row District =

Area of Chicago

Coordinates: 41°52′56″N 87°37′34″W

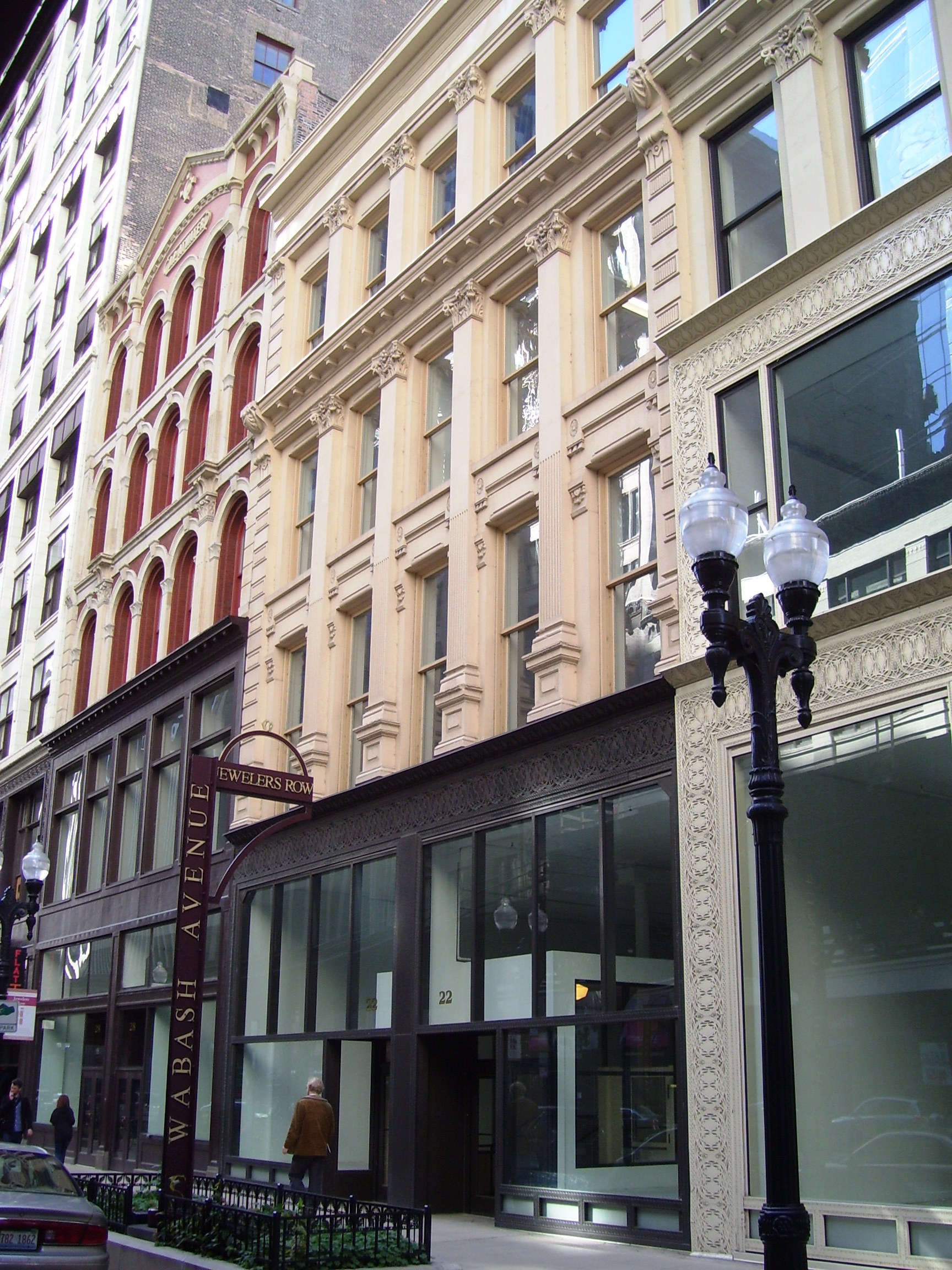
The Haskell-Barker-Atwater Buildings at 20, 22 & 28 Wabash Avenue are part of the Jewelers Row District, as well as being designated Chicago Landmarks themselves.

The Jewelers Row District is a historic district in the Loop community area of Chicago, Illinois in the United States. Running along Wabash Avenue, primarily between East Washington Street and East Monroe Street, the buildings in the district were built between 1872 and 1941 and were designed by many architects, including Graham, Anderson, Probst & White, John Mills Van Osdel, Adler & Sullivan, Alfred Alschuler, D. H. Burnham & Co., and Holabird & Roche in a variety of styles, including Italianate, Chicago School, and Art Deco. The buildings are variously loft buildings used for small manufacturers, mercantile buildings, office buildings and early skyscrapers.

The district was designated a Chicago Landmark on July 9, 2003. Three identical historical markers about the district can be found on lampposts within the district.
