= Pilsen Fest =

Festival in Chicago, Illinois

Pilsen Fest is an annual weekend festival in Pilsen, Chicago showcasing "musicians, chefs, mixologists, poets, muralists, painters, writers, documentarians, and photographers." It is also known as Pilsen Arts and Music Festival, and had an estimated 50,000 attendees in 2017. Musicians participating in 2017 included Nina Sky, Rey Pila, Elastic Bond, iLe, Nina Diaz, Cordoba, Purple Tokyo, DECIMA, Lolaa, and Black Bear Rodeo. Pilsen Fest is sponsored by bilingual online magazine El BeiSMan.

== See also ==
- Ruido Fest
- Riot Fest
- Spring Awakening
