= The Mollys =

American folk-rock quintet

- Origin: Tucson, Arizona
- Genres: Folk-rock
- Years active: 1989–2004, plus occasional subsequent reunions through 2012
- Members: Nancy McCallion, Catherine Zavala, Kevin Schramm, Dan Sorenson, Gary Mackender
- Past members: Karen Falkenstrom, Danny Krieger, Marx Loeb, Linda Winkelman
- Website: Official web site

The Mollys were an American folk-rock quintet, influenced by Celtic and Tejano music, and based in Tucson, Arizona. For most of their run, their members were Nancy McCallion, Catherine Zavala, Kevin Schramm, Dan Sorenson and Gary Mackender. They self-released several albums between 1992 and 2011.

== History ==
=== Before The Mollys ===
Three of The Mollys - Nancy McCallion, Catherine Zavala, and Dan Sorenson - had previously performed in the Tucson band Nadine and the MoPhonics, which also included McCallion's siblings Lisa and Neil.

=== The Mollys ===
In the Village Voice in 2000, Don Allred wrote that "Tucson, Arizona’s Mollys ARE TexMexistential Celtic Country Polka - which...has usually added up to 'Rock’n’Roll by Other Means.'" Craig Harris of Allmusic called them "one of the contemporary folk music's most eclectic bands." In the Washington Post in 1996, Greg Himes wrote that "[Nancy McCallion] rivals Lucinda Williams and Iris DeMent as one of the finest Americana songwriters of the '90s and she deserves a comparable reputation...".

Nancy McCallion and Catherine Zavala started The Mollys in Tucson in 1989. They were influenced by Celtic and Tejano music, and by The Pogues. In the beginning, Linda Winkelman and Karen Falkenstrom briefly joined on winds and percussion, respectively. For most of their run, the Mollys were Nancy McCallion (lead vocals, acoustic guitar, tin whistle, songwriting), Catherine Zavala (lead vocals, mandolin), Kevin Schramm (since 1994 - accordions, guitar, vocals), Dan Sorenson (bass, tour blogger), and Gary Mackender (drums, vocals). The Mollys toured across the United States frequently, and also in Canada, Italy, Australia and New Zealand. The Mollys performed at least once, in 1997, at the annual outdoor Celtic Fest Chicago; at one of these, the crowd and the City's festival operator loved their early afternoon performance so much that, on the spur of the moment, the Mollys were asked to, and did, reprise their set on the same stage late that same afternoon. Circa 2000, Zavala and Mackender, having tired of touring, left the band, and Danny Krieger (guitar) and Marx Loeb (drums) joined.

Between 1989 and 2004, The Mollys self-released seven albums, under the publishing name "Apolkalips Now". Nancy McCallion was the band's primary songwriter. The Mollys' album Hat Trick was given 4.5/5 stars by Allmusic, while Tidings of Comfort and Joy in 1992 was given 4/5 stars.

McCallion and the other remaining members nominally closed The Mollys down in 2004. However, through 2012, the band's longest-serving five members tended to perform an annual reunion concert in Tucson, typically around St. Patrick's Day or on Halloween, one of which resulted in an additional (live) album.

=== Beyond The Mollys ===
As of 2020, all of the former Mollys remain in the Tucson area.

Circa 2005-2016, the Last Call Girls, including Kevin Schramm, Nancy McCallion, and her sister Lisa McCallion, performed around Tucson and released one album. During the first decades of the 21st century, Kevin Schramm continued to perform with several other groups, and Dan Sorenson continued his journalism career while also performing occasionally. Linda Winkelman played in the jazz quartet Flambe.

As of early 2020, most of the former Mollys continued to perform locally, and some have also released recordings. Nancy McCallion performs more than once a month, leading several ensembles, some of which include her husband, and former Molly, Danny Krieger and/or her brother Neil McCallion, as of 2024. Nancy McCallion has also self-released several recordings, and continues to work as a schoolteacher. Since 2012, Zavala leads Minute2Minute, which occasionally performs and records. In March 2024, to celebrate both St. Patrick and the late Shane MacGowan of The Pogues, McCallion organized several performances of Irish music in Tucson, which included herself, Catherine Zavala, Dan Sorensen, and others.

Gary Mackender, now on accordion instead of drums, has led performances and recordings with The Carnivaleros through 2024. As of 2021-2022, Mackender had been performing in The Tirebiters (a.k.a. Sky Island Ramblers) and the Morpholinos, and by 2024, also in Dropped By Birds. Mackender also continues to work in the visual arts.

As of 2020, Marx Loeb continued to drum with a variety of other Tucson musicians, occasionally including Nancy McCallion. Karen Falkenstrom continued to drum with Odaiko Sonora and with Eldritch Dragons.

== Discography ==
=== Albums ===
(all albums self-published)

- Tidings of Comfort & Joy (1992)
- This Is My Round (1995)
- Hat Trick (1997)
- Wankin' Out West
- Moon Over the Interstate (1999)

- Moon Over the Interstate expanded version, with additional tracks from previous albums, originally packaged only to carry and sell during the Mollys' tour of Australia and New Zealand (1999)

- Only a Story (2000)
- Trouble (2002)
- "Live" at the El Casino Ballroom (2011)
