= Motoblot =

- Genre: Motorcycle rally
- Dates: Third full week in June
- Locations: Chicago, Illinois, United States
- Years active: 2014-2019, 2021-Current
- Founded: 2014
- Website: www.motoblot.com

Motoblot is an annual motorcycle rally held in Chicago, Illinois, for three days and four nights in June. It is the largest vintage motorcycle and scooter rally in the United States. One of the co-producers of the festival was Riot Fest founder Sean McKeough.

== History and features ==
The first Motoblot rally took place in July 2014, and was renamed from the previous "Mods vs Rockers Chicago" rally. In addition to a motorcycle and hot rod show, the rally features live music, the Miss Motoblot pin-up contest, and sponsorship by Triumph Motorcycles, Progressive Insurance, and All Rise Brewing.

Motoblot also has featured a custom motorcycle building competition called the Iron Moto Challenge. Local Chicago dealer Motoworks won the competition in 2014 and 2015.
