= Michigan Plaza =

Office complex in Chicago, Illinois

Coordinates: 41.8860°N 87.6236°W

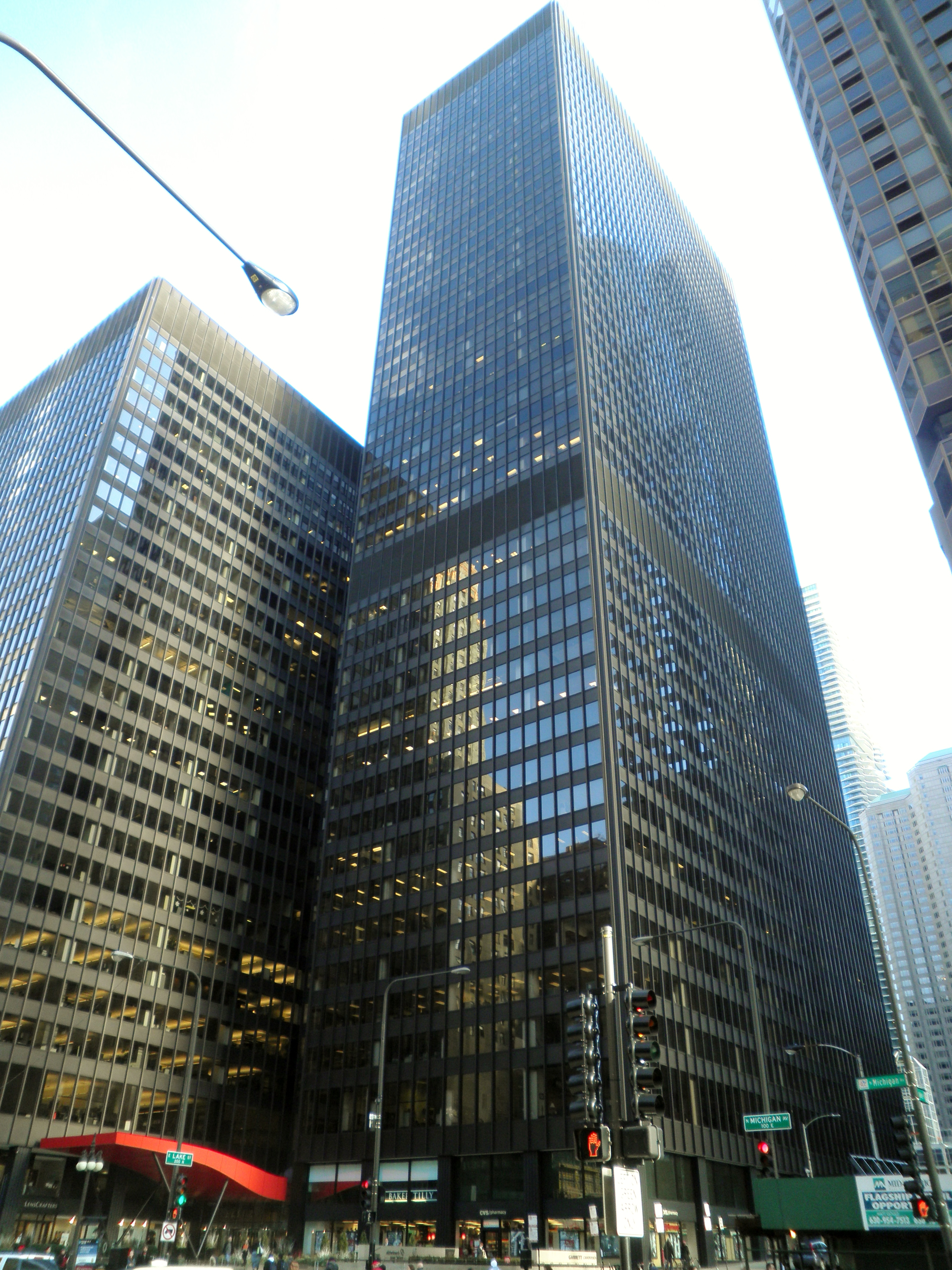

Michigan Plaza is a two-tower office complex in the Chicago Loop area of Chicago, Illinois, United States. The complex is managed and leased by MB Real Estate.

The complex consists of the 44-story 205 North Michigan Avenue and the 25-story 225 North Michigan Avenue and was designed by architect Fujikawa Johnson & Associates. The builders were inspired by the works of Ludwig Mies van der Rohe.

== Tenants ==
205 North Michigan:

- AFSCME Council 31 has its Chicago offices on the 21st Floor.
- Argosy University has its head offices on the thirteenth floor. The system moved its headquarters to Michigan Plaza on June 30, 2008.
- The Consulate-General of Argentina is in Suites 4208 and 4209 on the 42nd Floor.
- The Consulate-General of the Czech Republic is in Suite 1680.
- The Consulate-General of France is in Suite 3700.
- Television stations WFLD and WPWR-TV are both located on the ground floor.

225 North Michigan:

- Alzheimer's Association
- Blue Cross and Blue Shield Association has its headquarters in the building.
- Argosy University has its classroom space on the thirteenth floor. On June 30, 2008, the system moved its classrooms to Michigan Plaza from the Apparel Center at 350 North Orleans Street in the Near North Side. The school also leased 10,000 feet for its admissions department and other services on the concourse level.
- At one time China Airlines operated the Chicago Mini Office (Chinese: 芝加哥營業所 Zhījiāgē Yíngyèsuǒ) in Suite 1880. The office is now in Des Plaines.
