= Chicago Art Book Fair =

Annual art fair in Chicago, Illinois, US

- Location: Chicago, Illinois, United States
- Also known as: CABF
- Theme: artist's books, alternative media, zines, comics
- Website: cabf.no-coast.org/information

The Chicago Art Book Fair (CABF) is an art fair held in Chicago, Illinois, United States. The fair focuses on art books and small press publishing featuring independent artists, publishers, presses and printmakers. The genre of materials represented ranges from traditional artist's book publishers and printing to comics, zines and alternative press materials. The fair was founded by the artists Aay Preston-Myint and Alexander Valentine.

It was held annually in Chicago from 2017–2019 in November at the Chicago Athletic Association in downtown Chicago.
