= Ed Marszewski =

Chicago celebrity

Ed Marszewski talks about Version 05 festival in 2005.

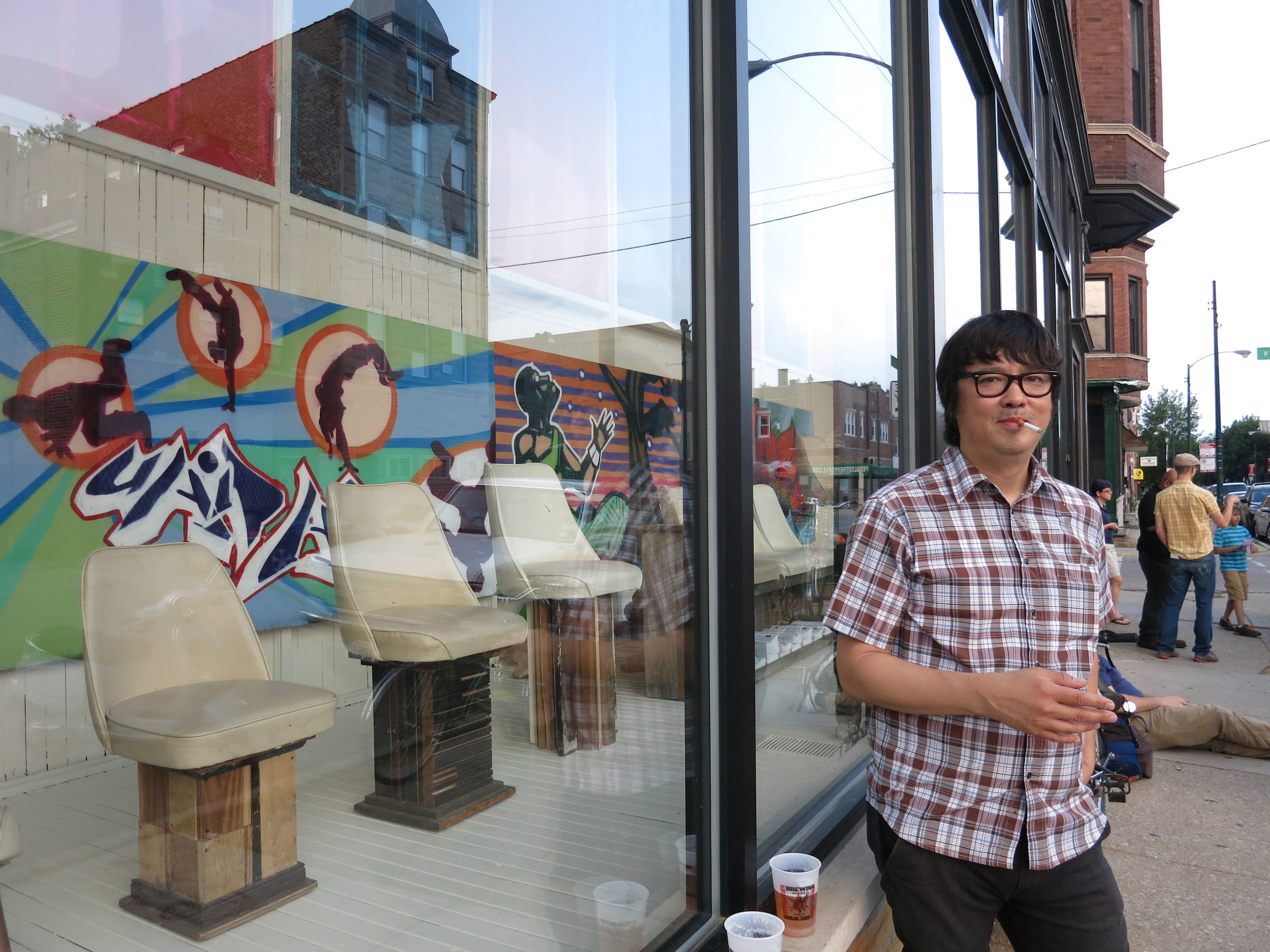
Marszewski in 2013

Edward Marszewski (also known as Ed Mar) is a publisher, artist and entrepreneur from Bridgeport, Chicago. He has been nicknamed the unofficial 'Mayor of Bridgeport'.

== Publishing ==
Marszewski is co-director of the Public Media Institute which publishes Lumpen magazine and Mash Tun Journal. Marszewski also publishes Proximity Magazine and the Quarantine Times.

== Restaurants ==
Marszewski is co-founder of Kimski, a Polish and Korean fusion restaurant, Maria’s Packaged Goods & Community Bar, Pizza Fried Chicken Ice Cream and Marz Community Brewing.

== Arts and festivals ==
Ed Marszewski in 2001, protesting the production of MTV's Real World Chicago in Wicker Park

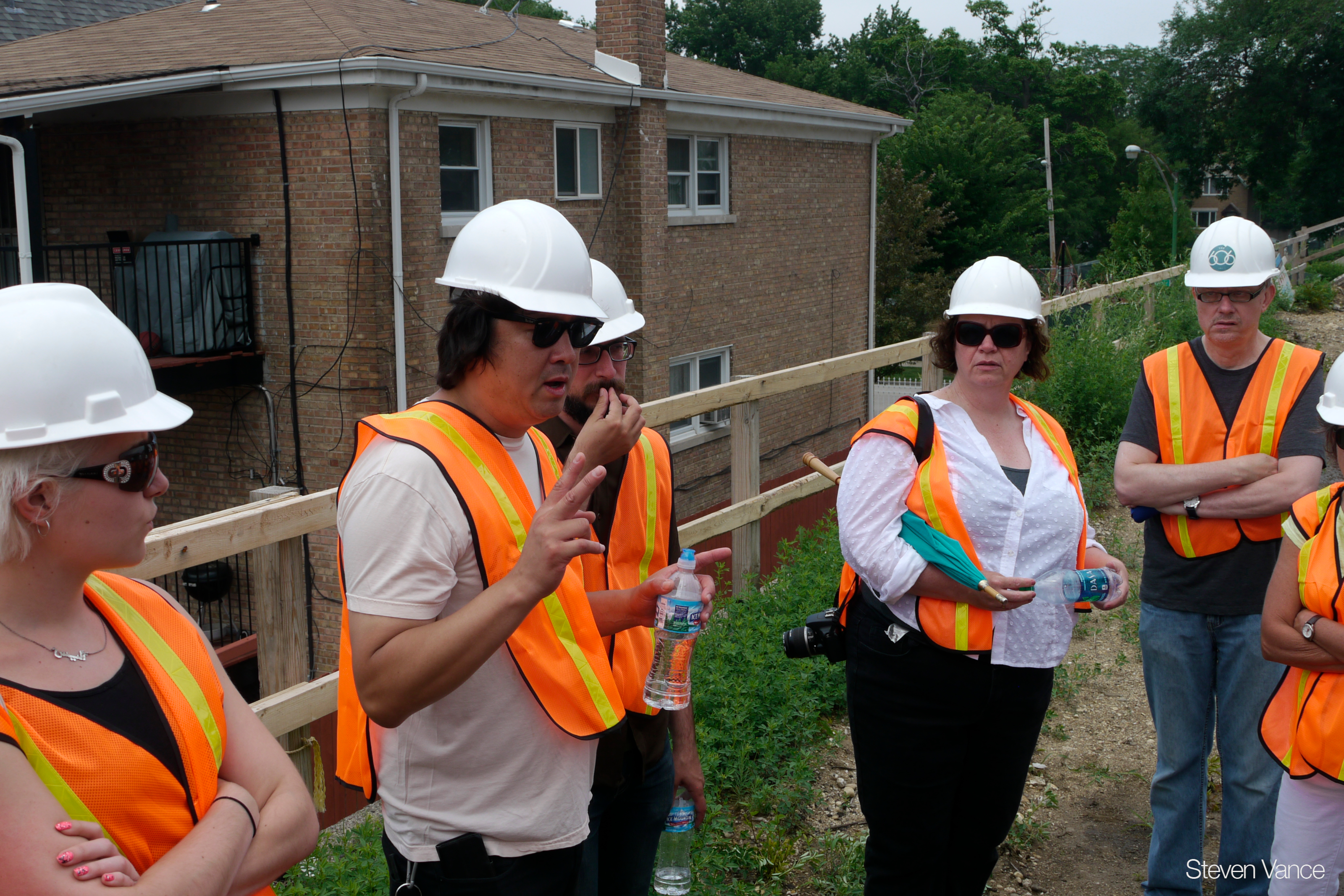
Ed Marszewski on the Bloomingdale Trail in 2014, before development of the trail into a park

Along with others, Marszewski rented space for an art gallery called 'BuddY' in Wicker Park from 2002 until 2004 which operated as an "experimental cultural center", and as of April 2013, operates an art gallery called Co-Prosperity Sphere (named after a live action role-playing group faction in the film Darkon) which operates Lumpen Radio as low-power radio station WLPN-LP inside the gallery. Marszewski is founder of various festivals in Chicago such as Version Fest and Select Media Festival. Marszewski has written many articles for Lumpen magazine and is opening a new 'Buddy' in the Chicago Cultural Center.
