= WLPN-LP =

- Chicago, Illinois; United States
- Frequency: 105.5 MHz (HD Radio)
- Branding: Lumpen Radio

Programming
- Affiliations: Pacifica Radio Network

Ownership
- Owner: Public Media Institute

History
- First air date: 2015
- Call sign meaning: "Lumpen"

Technical information
- Licensing authority: FCC
- Facility ID: 197687
- Class: L1
- ERP: 17 watts
- HAAT: 73 meters (240 ft)
- Transmitter coordinates: 41°52′8.9″N 87°41′36.1″W

Links
- Public license information: LMS
- Website: www.lumpenradio.com

WLPN-LP (105.5 FM) is a low-power radio station in Chicago started by Lumpen founder Edward Marszewski in 2015 who started a kickstarter campaign to raise funds for the station. The station operates out of an art gallery called the 'Co-Prosperity Sphere'.

== See also ==
- Lumpen (magazine)
