= Haskell-Barker-Atwater Buildings =

Building in Chicago

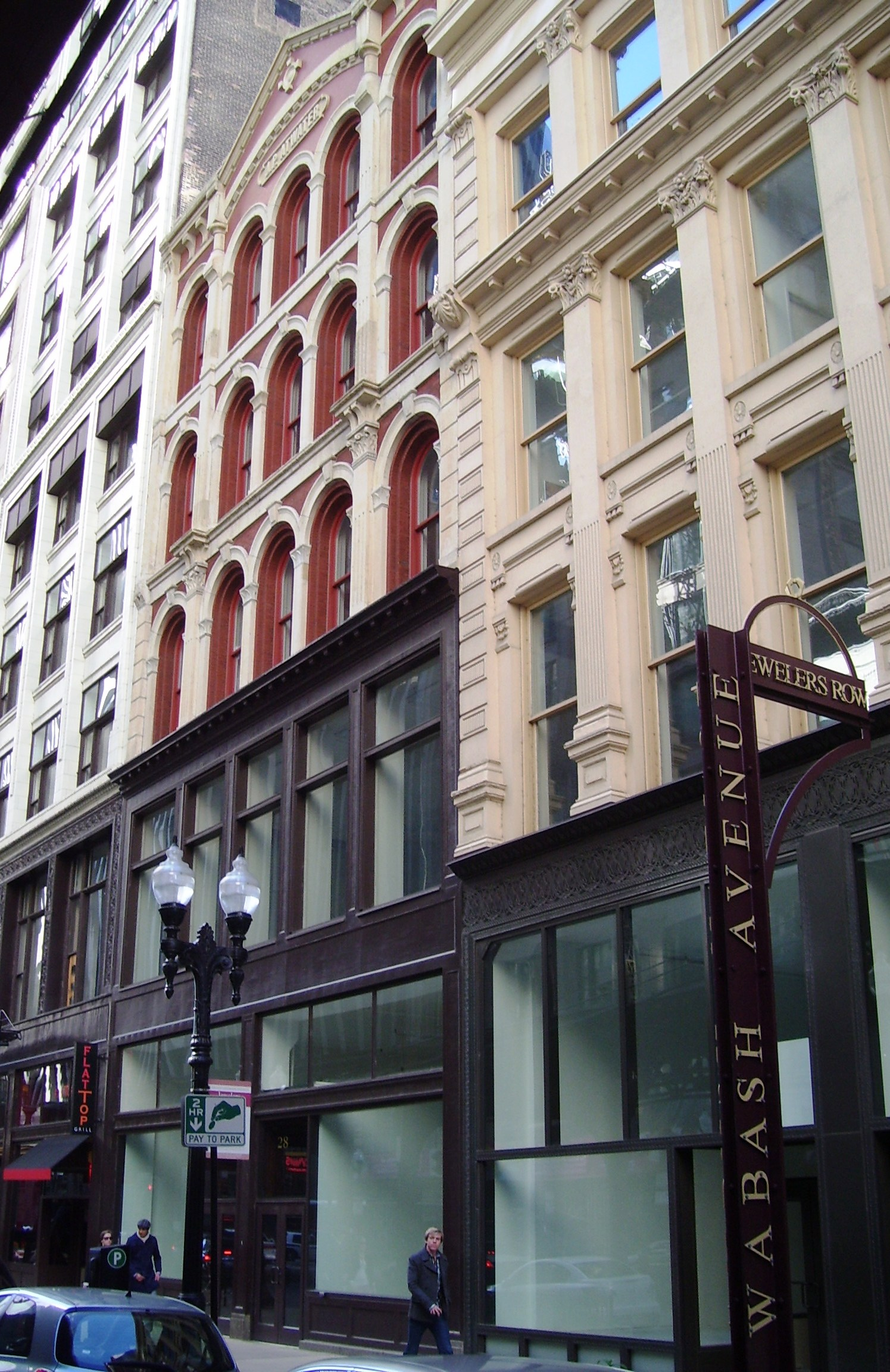
- Interactive map of the Haskell-Barker-Atwater Buildings area

General information
- Architectural style: Classical Revival
- Location: 18, 22, 28 S. Wabash Avenue, Chicago, United States
- Coordinates: 41.8815°N 87.6265°W
- Construction started: 1875
- Opened: 1877

Design and construction
- Architecture firm: Wheelock & Thomas (Haskell and Barker buildings), John M. Van Osdel (Atwater building)

The Haskell-Barker-Atwater Buildings are a trio of buildings located in the Loop community area of Chicago that were together declared a Chicago Landmark in 1996. The buildings, constructed between 1875 and 1877, represent some of the last remaining pre-skyscraper architecture in the East Loop. The bottom two floors of the Haskell building's facade were completely remodeled and spanned with decorative ironwork in 1896 by Louis Sullivan.
