= Aay Preston-Myint =

American artist and art educator

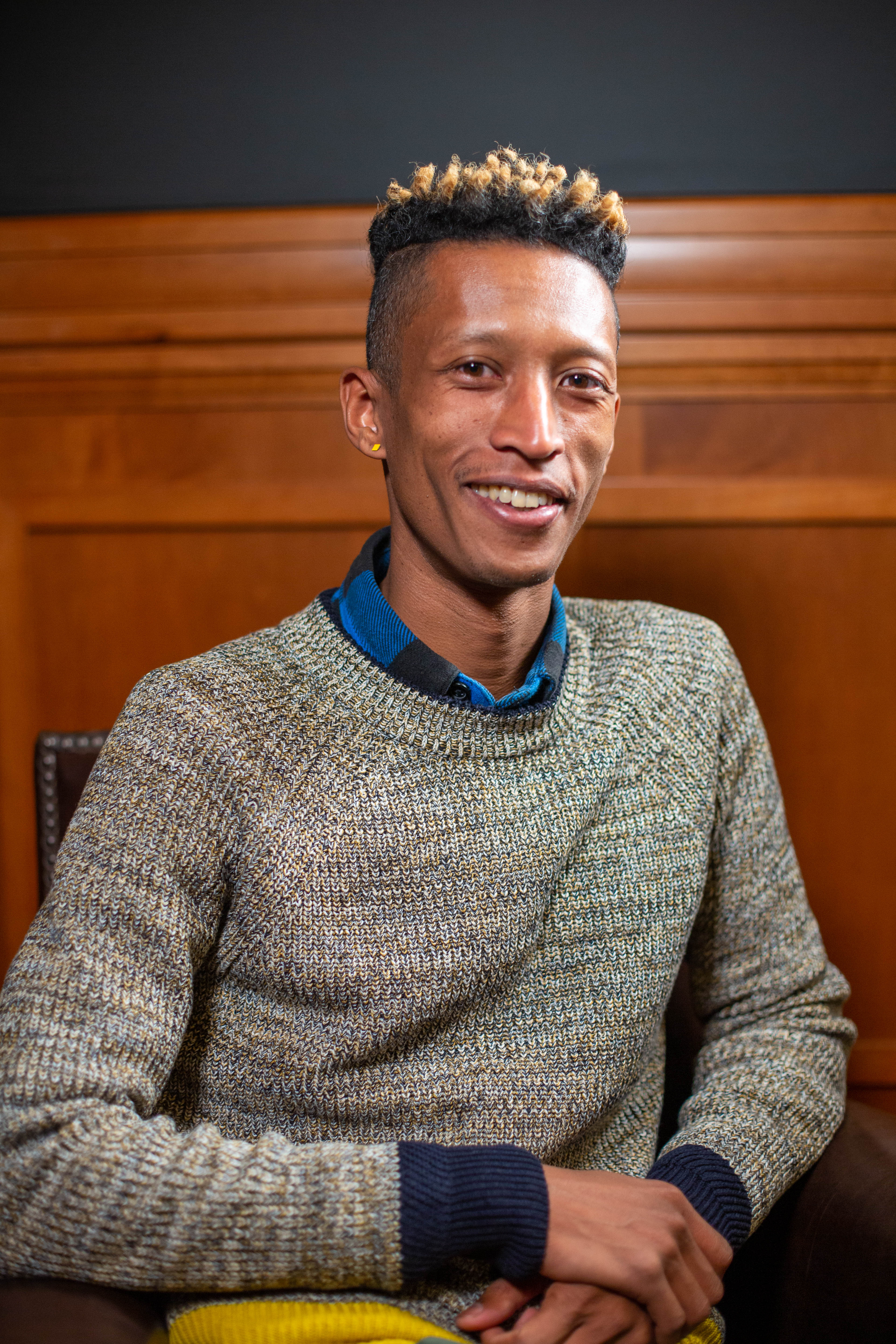
- Born: 1981 (age 44–45); New York City, New York, U.S.
- Known for: visual artist, art fair organizer
- Awards: Fellowship award (2019), Kala Art Institute
- Website: aay.pm

Aay Preston-Myint (born 1981) is a visual artist and art educator. He is based in Oakland, California.

== About ==
Aay Preston-Myint was born in 1981 in New York City, New York. He has worked extensively in Chicago, Illinois, and is a co-founder of the Chicago Art Book Fair. The Chicago Art Book Fair has been held annually since 2017 and emerged from the No Coast publishing imprint. Preston-Myint was a professor at the School of the Art Institute of Chicago; a program manager at the Headlands Center for the Arts in Sausalito, California, and the executive director of SF Camerawork in San Francisco, California.

He founded Chances Dances, a party that "supports and showcases the work of queer artists in Chicago."

== Exhibitions ==
Aay Preston-Myint's solo exhibitions include At Night, I Think of You, held at the Threewalls Gallery in Chicago in 2013; Project #11, and held in 2018 at the 'sindikit gallery in Baltimore, Maryland in 2018. He had two solo exhibitions shows in 2019: Wormhole at Adler & Floyd in Chicago and X O at the Royal Nonesuch Gallery in Oakland, California.
