= Addams Park =

Public park

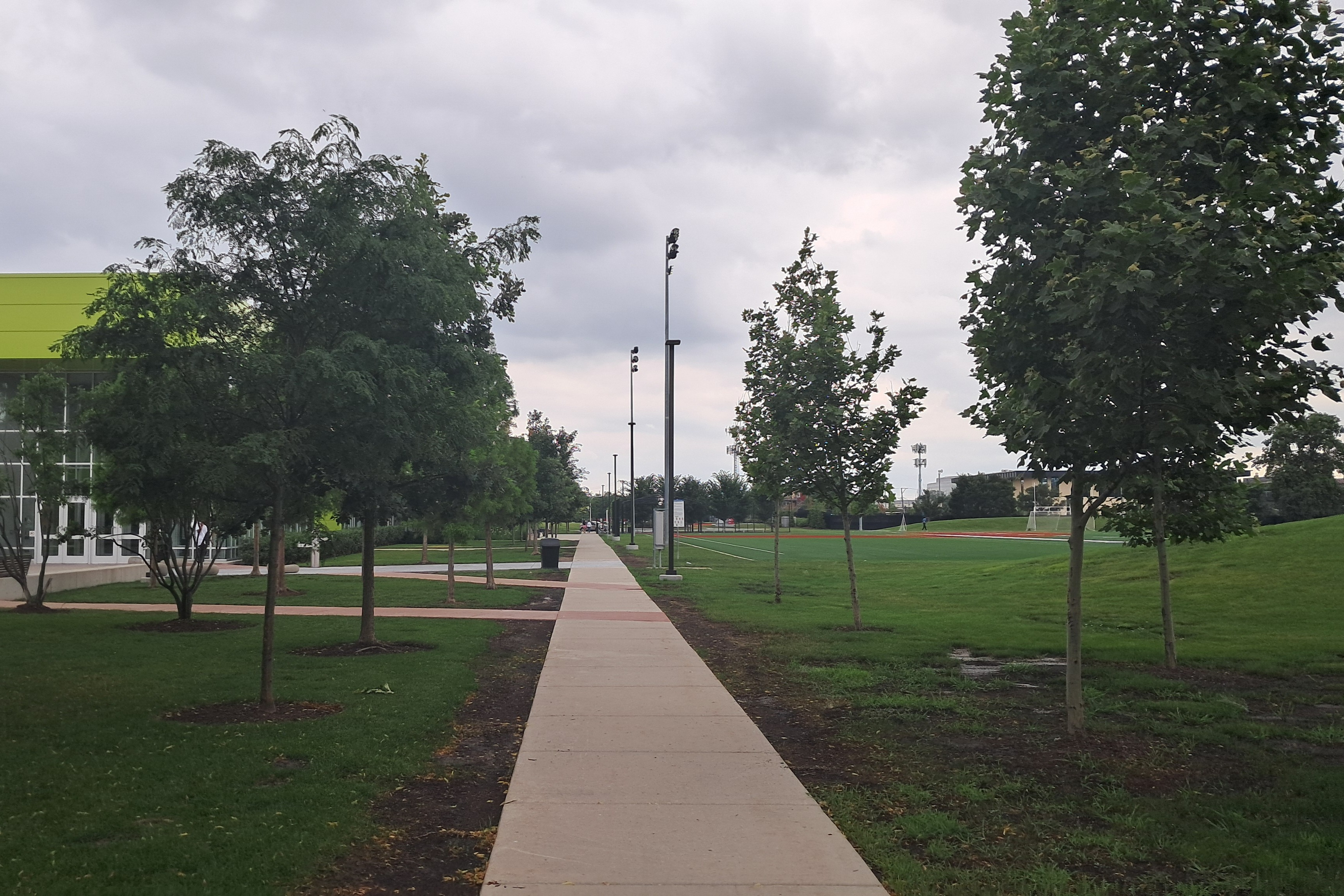
- Addams Park, with the ComEd Recreation Center on the left
- Interactive map of Addams Park
- Type: Urban park
- Location: Chicago, Illinois, U.S.
- Coordinates: 41.864°N 87.664°W
- Operator: Chicago Park District

Addams Park is a public park in Chicago named after Jane Addams. It is located in Little Italy in the Near West Side Community Area.

In June 2017 it was announced that Exelon planned to build a $20 million, 100,000 sq-ft multi-purpose indoor facility in the park. It opened in late winter 2019 under the name ComEd Recreation Center. The center features an artificial turf field, three-lane running track, gymnasium, and clubroom. The park also has an outdoor artificial turf football, soccer, and baseball field.

The area formerly hosted the Ruido Fest and Spring Awakening music festivals.

== See also ==
- ABLA Homes
