= Lumpen (magazine) =

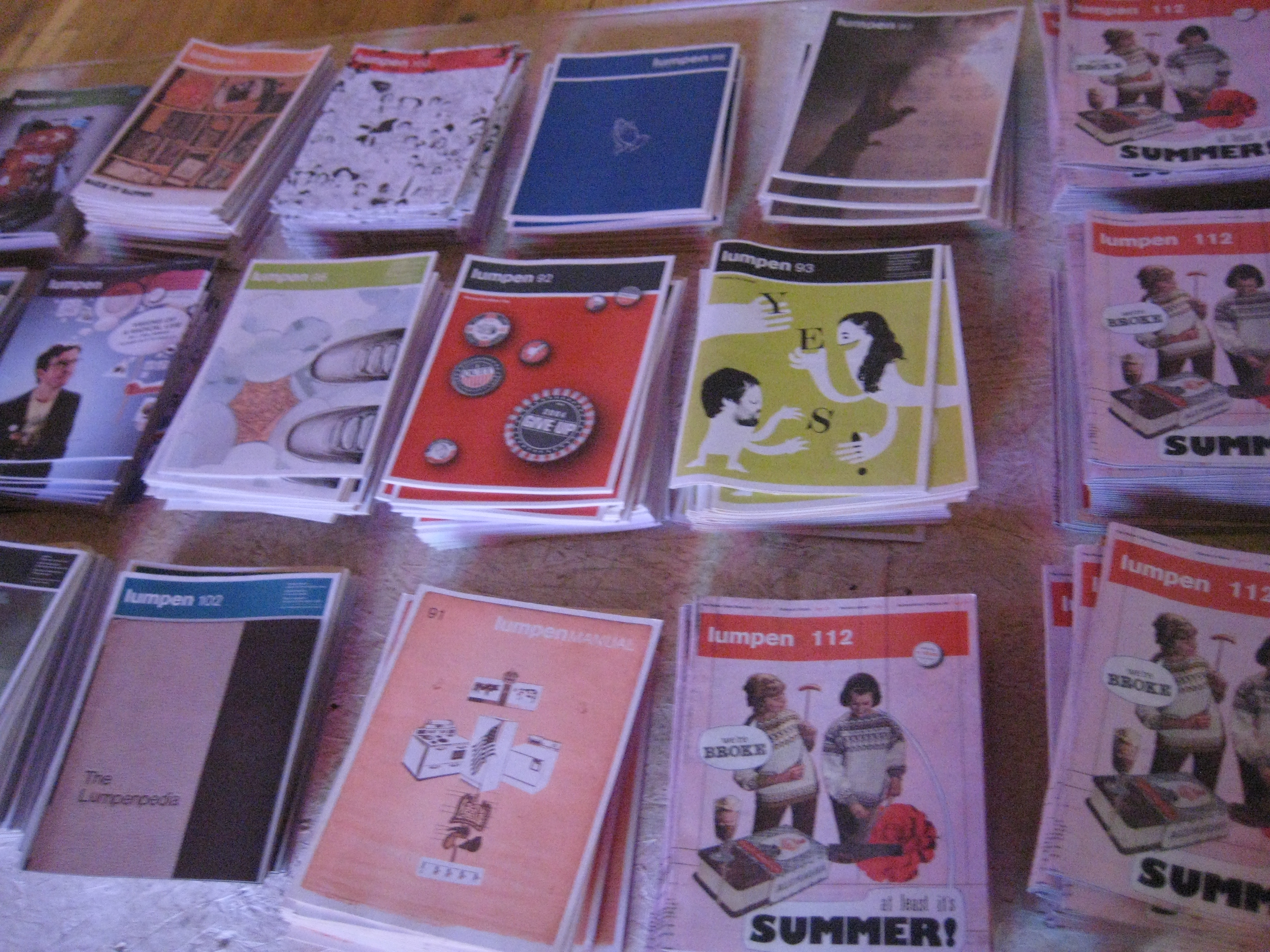
Various issues of the magazine

Lumpen is an American magazine published since 1991, whose editor-in-chief is Edward Marszewski. The magazine covers topics of local and global politics, art and music and is published in Chicago, Illinois, United States. The magazine is often published under themes such as 'makers' or 'comics'.

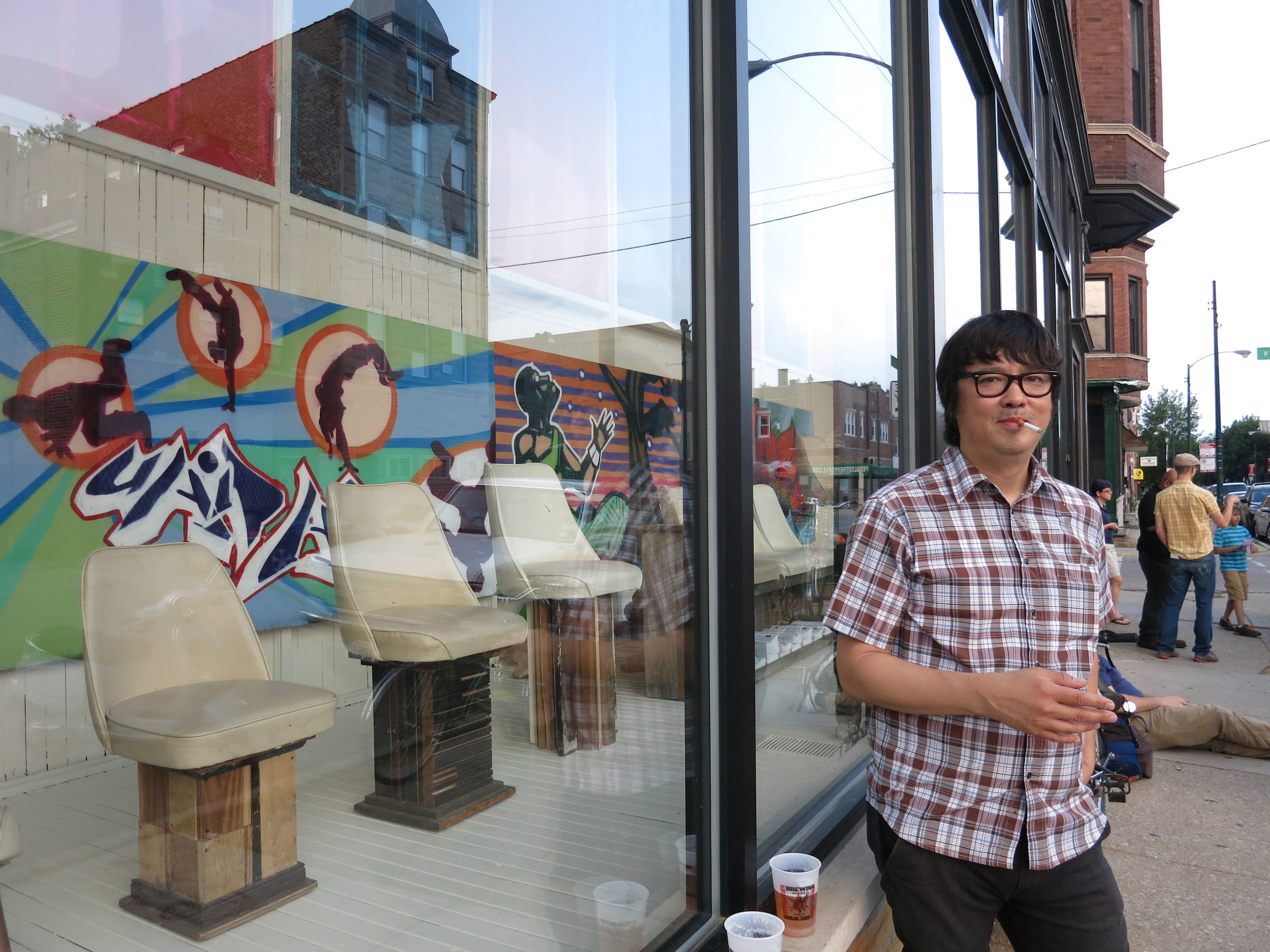
Editor-in-chief Edward Marszewski

== See also ==
- WLPN-LP
