= South Chicago Township, Illinois =

Former township in Cook County, Illinois

Coordinates: 41°51′N 87°38′W

South Chicago Township
- Former township
- Interactive map of South Chicago Township
- Country: United States
- State: Illinois
- County: Cook

South Chicago Township was a township in Cook County, Illinois that was part of the City of Chicago. It comprised that part of pre-1889 Chicago south and east of the Chicago River. When Lake and Hyde Park townships to its south were annexed to Chicago they were maintained as townships and not incorporated into South Chicago Township, which was bound to the south by modern-day Pershing Road. Chicago residents voted to eliminate the townships in the city in 1902, including South Chicago Township; nevertheless, they remain in use for the purposes of property assessment.
