= The Way of the Cross Downtown Chicago =

The Way of the Cross Downtown Chicago is an annual public event sponsored by the Catholic lay movement Communion and Liberation. The Way of the Cross takes place on Good Friday and follows the passion of Christ through the heart of the city. Through choral music, Gospel passages, reflections, and silent procession, the hope is to enter more deeply into the events of Good Friday and their meaning today. It is an entreaty to experience the exceptional presence of Christ as a real answer to the needs of the heart.

== History ==
In 2005 another group of friends belonging to Communion and Liberation asked permission and began The Way of the Cross Downtown Chicago. The event has grown each year with attendance reaching 500 in recent years.

This event's on hiatus until April 2021.

== Route ==
Introduction - 9:00 AM
DALEY PLAZA
(Dearborn/Washington)

First Stop
THOMPSON CENTER
(Clark/Randolph)

Second Stop
VETERANS MEMORIAL
(Riverwalk @ State/Wacker)

Third Stop
TRIBUNE TOWER PLAZA
(Michigan @ the River)

Fourth Stop
WATER TOWER PLAZA
(Michigan/Chicago)

Fifth Stop - 11:30 AM
HOLY NAME CATHEDRAL
(State/Superior)
