= Chicago Outdoor Film Festival =

American film festival

The Chicago Outdoor Film Festival was a summer film-screening series held at Butler Field in Grant Park. For 10 years, it projected classic films on Tuesday nights from mid-July through August. The city cancelled the festival in 2010 for budgetary reasons.
