= Ruido Fest =

Music festival in Chicago, Illinois, US

- Genre: Latin Music, rock, alternative rock
- Location: Chicago
- Years active: 2015–2019, 2021–present (2023 canceled)
- Founders: Rock Sin Anestesia, Riot Fest Presents, Star Events, Metronome
- Website: ruidofest.com

Ruido Fest is an annual multi-day Latin American music festival in Chicago, Illinois, held every July in Addams/Medill Park.

Ruido Fest was first held July 10–12, 2015. The festival features "Latin post punk, electronic, hip-hop, rock, psychedelia, tropicalia, reggae and punk acts from all over the American continent and world". Ruido is the Spanish word for "noise".

Ruido Fest had been scheduled for August 19-20, 2023 but was abruptly canceled.

== Founding ==
Ruido Fest was founded in 2015 by Eduardo Calvillo and a team of partners that include Chicago Rock Sin Anestesia, alternative music festival Riot Fest Presents, Star Events and Metronome Chicago. Ruido Fest is the first large Latin American alternative music festival of its kind in America.

Max Wagner, owner of Chicago production company Metronome, said "We are seeking to create a destination for Latin alternative music, not only for the people of this great festival city, but also for fans of quality Latin entertainment across the nation.”

== 2021 ==
After taking 2020 off due to the COVID-19 pandemic, Chicago's Ruido Fest welcomed festival-goers back to Union Park for the three-day event starting on August 20, 2021. The festival was headlined by Caifanes, Panteón Rococó, and Café Tacuba.

== 2017 ==
Ruido Fest's third year was held on July 7–9, 2017. The lineup included Cultura Profética, Bomba Estéreo, Titán, Duncan Dhu, Desorden Público, Gepe, Adan Jodorowsky, Jessica Hernandez & the Deltas, Clubz, Silver Rose, Ácido Pantera, Molotov, Julieta Venegas, Los Amigos Invisibles, Silverio, Lucybell, A Band of Bitches, Javiera Mena, El Guincho, The Wookies, Camilo Séptimo, Sotomayor, Los Nastys, Extraperlo, Wet Baes, Intocable, Mon Laferte, Fobia, Álex Anwandter, Rostros Ocultos, Víctimas del DOCTOR Cerebro, Buscabulla, Pedrina y Rio, King Lil G, Simpson Ahuevo, Ruido Rosa, Las Piñas, and Disco las Palmeras! Mylko. Many acts were performing in Chicago for their first time.

=== Controversy ===
For marketing purposes, Home Depot set up a small wall to allow Ruido Fest attendees to decorate tiles and try out a product for laying tile; the wall stirred up emotions related to Trump's border wall and was criticized by attendees. The wall was dismantled. A Home Depot representative called the situation "an unfortunate misunderstanding" in a statement.

== 2016 ==
Ruido Fest's second year was held on July 8–10. The lineup included Los Fabulosos Cadillacs, Maldita Vecindad, Aterciopelados, Panteón Rococó, Natalia Lafourcade, Carla Morrison, Los Pericos, La Santa Cecilia, Cuca, Miranda!, Los Cafres, Le Butcherettes, Silverio, Mexrrissey, Adan & Xavi, Altocamet, Ayer Amarillo, Banda de Turistas, Comisario Pantera, Dromedarios Magicos, Estelares Helado Negro, Hong Kong Blood Opera, Ibiza Pareo, Instituto Mexicano del Sonido, Izcalli, Killer Moon, Las Robertas, Lng Sht, Los Blenders, Los Vicios de Papa, Marineros, Minimal, Mon Laferte, Monoplasma, Odisseo, Riesgo de Contagio, Sexy Zebras, Urss Bajo El Arbol, Vaya Futuro, and Yokozuna.

== 2015 ==
Ruido Fest's inaugural year was 2015. It was held on July 10–12. The inaugural lineup for Ruido Fest included Café Tacvba, Zoé, Molotov, Kinky, Ozomatli, Zero Kill, Nortec Collective, Mexican Institute of Sound, Enjambre, Porter, Estelates, Aj Davila & Terror Amor, Astro, Banda De Turistas, Bumbac Joe, Callate Mark, Cardiel, Carmen Costa, Ceci Bastida, Cumbia Machin, Dellarge, División Minúscula, Descartes A Kant, DJ Afro, Dos Santos Anti-Beat Orchestra, Esso! Afrojam Funk Beat, Hurakan, Jessy Bulbo, Kali Uchis, La Armada, La Vida Bohème, Los Aguas Aguas, Los Crema Paraiso, Los Rakas, Los Romanticos De Zacatecas, Master Blaster Sound System, Chicano Batman.

== See also ==
- Pilsen Fest
- Spring Awakening
- Riot Fest
