= Asian Animation Film Festival =

Film festival

The Asian Animation Film Festival (AAFF) is a film festival held in Chicago for one year in 2006. Founded by the Center for Asian Arts and Media at Columbia College Chicago, AAFF is a unique four-day festival devoted to Pan-Asian artists and animation.

By presenting films that are either related to the topics of Asian culture or involving an artist of Asian descent, AAFF hopes to introduce audiences to a broader range of Asian animation while allowing artists to express the vast and diverse Pan-Asian experience.
