= Printers Row Lit Fest =

Printers Row Lit Fest is an annual book fair and literary festival held in Chicago, Illinois in September. The fair's literary "tableau . . . fills a downtown district where linotype machines and printing presses once whirred." The neighborhood was an early book making hub.

Founded in 1985 by the Near South Planning Board and originally called the Printers Row Book Fair, it was initially intended to attract visitors to the Printers Row neighborhood on Chicago's near South Side, which had previously been a major publishing hub. The Chicago Tribune acquired the festival from the Near South Planning Board in 2002. It is now known as the Printers Row Lit Fest.

Festivals are located on Dearborn between Congress and Polk and along Polk between Plymouth Court and Clark. In the early 21st century, attendance was around 80,000 to 90,000 attendees. According to Publishers Weekly, it was by then the Midwest's largest book fair. In the 2010s, attendance reached 150,000. Included in the festival are hundreds of book vendors, multiple talks with authors, readings, and other programs. C-SPAN Television has broadcast from the festival.

For its initial thirty-four years, the fair was held in late spring or early summer in June. In 2020, the fair was held in September, and it has been regularly held in September ever since.

== See also ==
- Books in the United States
