= Riot Fest =

Annual rock music festival

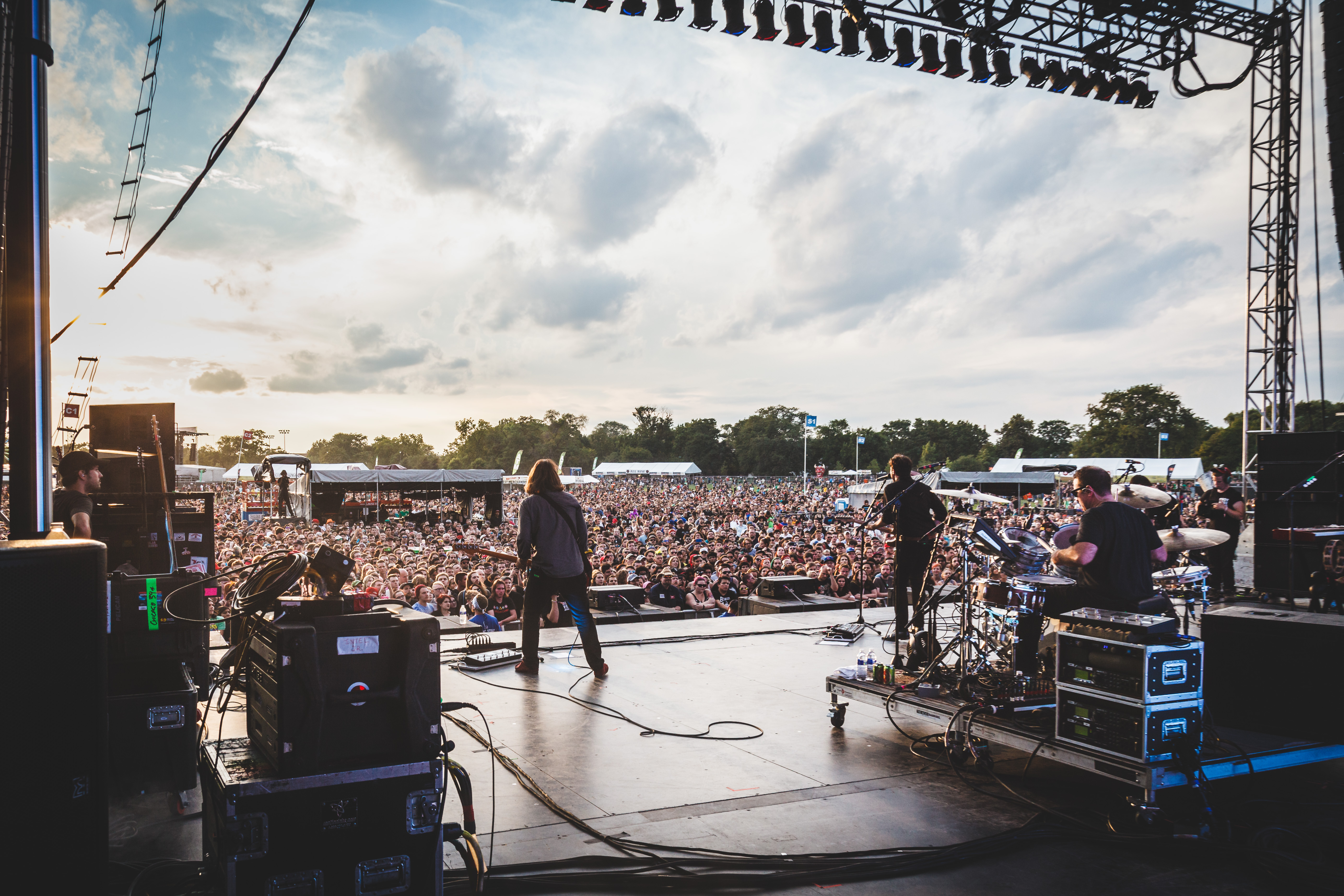
- Jimmy Eat World at Riot Fest 2016
- Genre: Punk rock
- Dates: September 19–21, 2025
- Locations: Douglass Park, Chicago, Illinois, United States
- Years active: 2005–present
- Founders: Mike Petryshyn & Sean McKeough
- Website: riotfest.org

Riot Fest is an annual three-day punk rock music festival held at Douglass Park in Chicago, Illinois. It is known for booking reunions, guest performances, and full album performances. Riot Fest is one of the largest independently owned music festivals in the United States.

== History ==
Riot Fest was established in Chicago in 2005 by Mike Petryshyn and Sean McKeough. McKeough also co-produced Chicago's Motoblot annual motorcycle rally. Riot Fest spent seven years as a multi-venue festival, using the Metro, Subterranean, Double Door, Cobra Lounge, and the Congress Theater to present bands over a three-day weekend.

In 2012, Riot Fest moved to an outdoor venue at Chicago's Humboldt Park and was marketed as Riot Fest & Carnival, with rides, games, wrestling, and food vendors. 2012 also saw the festival expand through North America, with events in Brooklyn, Toronto, Dallas, and Denver soon after. Since McKeough's death in 2016, Riot Fest has remained an annual event in Chicago.

The festival played a key role in the reunions of Naked Raygun, The Replacements in 2013, the Misfits in 2016, and Jawbreaker in 2017, among others.

=== 2012 ===
The festival consisted of two days of music at Humboldt Park on Saturday, September 15 and Sunday, September 16 and a Friday night kickoff at the Congress Theater.

=== 2013 ===
Riot Fest & Carnival returned to Humboldt Park in Chicago in 2013 and included satellite festivals in Toronto (August 24–25) and Denver (September 21–22). The 2013 festival was noted for being the first performance by reunited punk legends the Replacements and notably the first performance by the band in Chicago since their very public breakup onstage at the Taste of Chicago in 1991.

=== 2014 ===
In September 2014 Riot Festival & Carnival returned to Humboldt Park for the last time. Roberto Maldonado, who had been a supporter of Riot Fest in the past, stated he would not have the fest back for 2015. This was due to damages to the park after heavy rain during the festival. The repairs cost $150,000.

Riot Fest 2014 included the inaugural "Riot Fest Speaks" panel, moderated by Henry Rollins. In addition, 2014 saw the return of Riot Fest in Denver and Toronto.

=== 2015 ===
Conflicts over the condition of the grass and negative effects on the Boricua community, including gentrification of Humboldt Park and lack of financial benefits to the area's residents led the festival to move to Douglass Park. Saint Anthony Hospital sued Riot Fest on September 4, arguing that the festival would be detrimental to its patients' health because of the "extreme noise" and the heavy traffic that would surround the hospital. The two sides reached an agreement that included "restoring parking on 19th Street in front of Saint Anthony Hospital, building pedestrian barricades on the west side of California Avenue and sound monitoring within the hospital to protect patients."

Saturday saw the return of the "Riot Fest Speaks" panel series, once again moderated by Henry Rollins. Sunday also featured an additional "Riot Fest Speaks" panel, Basement Screams, on Chicago's independent and punk scenes.

=== 2016 ===
On May 12, 2016, it was announced that after 33 years, the Misfits lineup of Glenn Danzig, Jerry Only and Doyle Wolfgang von Frankenstein would reunite and headline the Riot Fest in Chicago and Denver in September 2016.

=== 2017 ===
On March 17, 2017, Riot Fest announced that the festival would not return to Denver, citing the death of co-founder Sean Mckeough the previous November as making it impossible to focus on more than one event in 2017. Despite this, the festival has expressed interest in eventually returning to Denver. In April 2017, it was announced that Jawbreaker was reuniting after 21 years and playing Riot Fest 2017.

=== 2018 ===
Riot Fest was again held in Douglas Park in Chicago, September 14–16. Behind the scenes issues led to the finalized lineup and schedule not being released until the week before the fest, leading many to assume the 2018 version would be the third iteration to be canceled. Blink-182 was originally set to headline the first night but dropped out after drummer Travis Barker was hospitalized for blood clots in his arms. The band was replaced with Weezer and Run the Jewels, and would ultimately be booked the next year.

=== 2019 ===
Douglas Park, Chicago, Illinois, September 13–15, 2019. This year marked the 15th anniversary of the festival.

=== 2021 ===
Riot Fest was held in Douglass Park on September 17–19 with a preview party on the 16th.

My Chemical Romance was initially announced in January 2020 as the headliner for Riot Fest 2020. The event was then postponed in June 2020 due to COVID-19.

On April 16, 2021, My Chemical Romance announced the postponement of all shows until 2022. In response, Riot Fest confirmed the 2021 edition of the festival was still happening and shared a letter from founder Mike Petryshyn stating their intent to announce new headliners and a complete lineup in May 2021.

On August 19, 2021, Nine Inch Nails announced the cancellation of their 2021 dates. In response, Riot Fest booked Slipknot as a new headliner, and added a special 'preview party' on the 16th with Morrissey. Later, the Pixies also canceled their 2021 tour dates. On September 2, Riot Fest added The Flaming Lips on Sunday with Slipknot, and on the 16th added Alkaline Trio, Patti Smith, Joyce Manor and more. Around the same time, Dinosaur Jr. also canceled their dates until November, with Riot Fest adding Pinegrove soon after.

On September 14, both Faith No More and Mr. Bungle also announced the cancellation of each band's fall 2021 dates, including Riot Fest, citing vocalist Mike Patton's ongoing mental health issues. Riot Fest organizers booked Rise Against and Anthrax as replacements for both bands.

=== 2022 ===
Riot Fest was held in Douglass Park on September 16 – 18.

The festival's 2022 lineup was announced on May 11. Placebo was initially announced to be playing on Friday, September 16, but had to withdraw from the festival when their planned North American tour was postponed due to visa and logistical issues. Bauhaus was scheduled to play on Saturday, September 17, but canceled their planned 2022 tour when lead singer Peter Murphy entered rehab. Placebo and Bauhaus were replaced in the lineup by Sparta and Gogol Bordello, respectively.

=== 2023 ===
It was announced on May 15, 2023, that Riot Fest would return to Douglass Park September 15–17. The lineup was announced on May 17. On Sunday, rainy conditions delayed the festival's start to 2 PM and canceled all early sets that day.

=== 2025 ===
The 20th anniversary was held in Douglass Park, and the lineup included Green Day, Blink-182, Weezer, IDLES, "Weird Al" Yankovic, The Beach Boys, Jack White, Dropkick Murphys, The Linda Lindas, All Time Low, Hanson, Rico Nasty, The Front Bottoms, Cobra Starship, Alkaline Trio, Gym Class Heroes, The Paradox, and Rilo Kiley.

=== 2026 ===
Held in Douglass Park from September 18-20, the Riot Fest lineup included Twenty One Pilots, Pierce The Veil, Tool, Alanis Morissette, Pixies, Rise Against, Morrissey, Elvis Costello, Patti Smith, Sex Pistols, and the premiere of William Shatner and The *uckers. Heavy rain over the weekend forced the festival to end early on Saturday and start late on Sunday, with several acts canceled and moved. The rain at the festival left heavy mud damage to the park.

== Cancellations ==
Three instances of Riot Fest have been canceled. The first came in 2009 in the form of Riot Fest West, originally set to happen in November 2009 and postponed in September. The fest initially vowed to make up the dates in spring 2010 but the replacement fest did not materialize. The second cancellation came in 2012 when Riot Fest East in Philadelphia was postponed, this time one week before the show's planned July 19 start date. Though a reschedule was initially promised, it never emerged. The third cancellation came in 2020 when concerns due to the COVID-19 pandemic made the festival's cancellation inevitable. Organizers have called this a postponement, as a significant part of the 2020 lineup played in the 2021 festival.

Though not an outright cancellation, Riot Fest Brooklyn in 2012 was shut down early due to weather concerns.

== Controversies ==
On August 2, 2022, Riot Fest held a first of its kind community meeting with residents surrounding Douglass Park, where the festival has been held since 2015; the meeting was a requirement issued by the Chicago Park District. Residents claimed the meeting was held in the middle of a weekday and was poorly advertised, criticizing a lack of chairs for the elderly or an interpreter for Spanish speakers. The meeting was led by Scott Fisher, an independent contractor hired by Riot Fest for four years; Fisher is also the president of Special Event Services Group, who Riot Fest hired as its primary service provider from 2016 to 2022. During the meeting, Fisher responded to a local resident by saying, “Listen if you can’t understand pure English and the fact that I can’t answer that question...” before being drowned out by residents. A recording of the meeting, and Fisher's remarks, was published by the Chicago Reader on August 4, 2022. Shortly after, the festival issued an apology to the Douglass Park community; a Riot Fest spokesperson claimed the meeting was "scheduled without authorization” from Riot Fest management, and that Fisher quit his position soon after.

In 2023, residents of the Douglas Park neighborhood protested the festival's plans to continue operating there. Discussions deteriorated into yelling at a community event between neighborhood residents and festival organizers, as community members complained that the music fest forces them out of large sections of the public park for weeks at a time so private events can be held, damages the park, and has displaced youth sports teams. Community members had petitioned the Chicago Park District to remove Riot Fest and other music festivals from Douglass Park in 2022.

Stephen Shult, of Arlington Heights, was reported missing after attending Riot Fest’s last day in 2024. He died after being put in an intensive care unit for head trauma. Riot Fest organizers denied that he had been injured at the festival.

== See also ==
- List of punk rock festivals
- Ruido Fest – Music festival in Chicago, Illinois, US
- Spring Awakening Music Festival – Electronic music festival, Chicago, IL, US
