= Celtic Fest Chicago =

Festival of Celtic culture

Celtic Fest Chicago was a music and culture festival held annually from 1997 to 2010, in Chicago's downtown lakefront parks.

Not just an "Irish" festival, Celtic Fest Chicago was a cultural celebration of the ancient Celtic nations of Ireland; Brittany, France; Galicia, Spain; Scotland; the Isle of Man; Cornwall, England; and Wales. Celtic music enfolds a variety of rich cultures, as various geographical areas contribute diverse backgrounds and flavors. Celtic Fest Chicago celebrated this long history with music and traditions that date back to 300 B.C. Celtic Fest Chicago included performers both from the European countries of origin and from across North America.

The first Celtic Fest was held over two days in the third week of September 1997 in Chicago's Grant Park, on Columbus Drive and Jackson Boulevard. By 2010, its final year, the Celtic Fest was being held over a single day in May in Chicago's recently-opened Millennium Park.
