= Spring Awakening Music Festival =

Electronic music festival, Chicago, IL, US

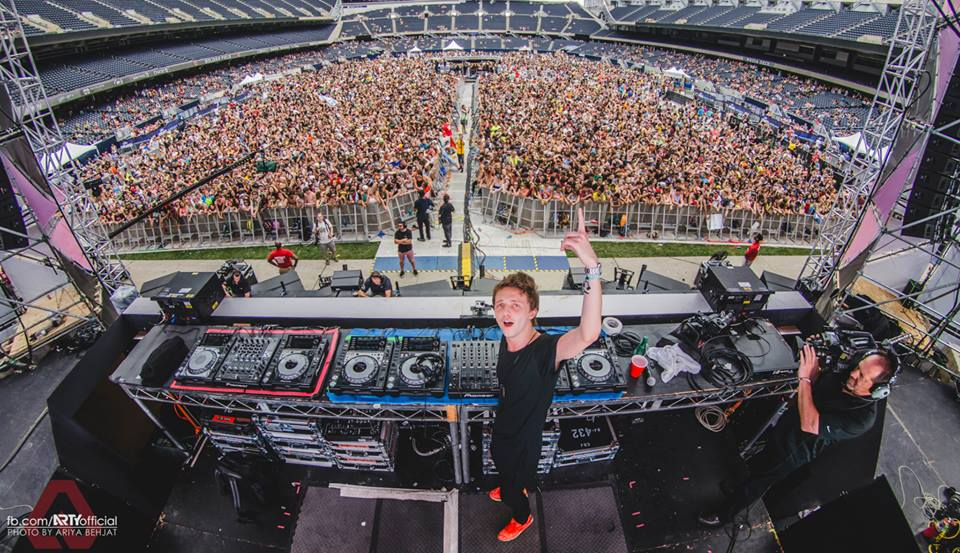
- Arty at Spring Awakening in 2014
- Genre: Progressive house, Dubstep, Electro house, Techno, Trance, Trap
- Locations: Soldier Field, Addams/Medill Park, Sears Centre, United Center
- Years active: 2008–2019, 2021
- Organizer: React Presents
- Website: www.springawakeningfestival.com

Spring Awakening Music Festival (SAMF) was an annual electronic dance music (EDM) festival held in Chicago. The festival started at a theater in 2008, moved to Soldier Field in 2012–2015, and to Addams/Medill Park in 2016–2018. In 2019, the festival moved to the Sears Centre in Hoffman Estates, Illinois. Due to the COVID-19 pandemic, the festival was not held in 2020, and the 2021 event was held in October at Addams/Medill Park. The 2022 festival was scheduled to be held at the United Center on July 8–10, but was subsequently cancelled.

== History ==
Spring Awakening was founded as a concert series in 2008. The event eventually outgrew the theater, and in 2012 SAMF was turned into a two-day outdoor music festival at Soldier Field by the Chicago-based promoting agency React Presents. In 2013, Spring Awakening Music Festival expanded to three days with over 90,000 people in attendance. SAMF has traditionally been held either the second or third weekend of June. Over the years, the festival has become increasingly popular due to the large fan base of electronic dance music in the Chicago area. As people now come from across the nation and globe just to attend the festival, there are discussed rumors that the festival could be extending onwards towards other states.

=== Producers ===
Founded in 2008, React Presents is a club, festival, and concert festival promotion company based in Chicago. React Presents produces four festivals: Spring Awakening Music Festival, North Coast Music Festival, Forever Festival, and Summer Set Music & Camping Festival.

== 2012 ==
In 2012 SAMF became a two-day festival and was held June 16–17 at Soldier Field.

The festival was initially announced to occupy the "Stadium Green" surrounding Soldier Field, but after overwhelming demand, the festival moved the main stage inside of the stadium at the north end zone. Over 50,000 people attended Spring Awakening Music festival 2012.

Some of the main performers included Skrillex, Afrojack, Diplo, A-Trak, Benny Benassi, Dillon Francis, Moby, Flux Pavilion, Hardwell, Datsik, Morgan Page and more.

== 2013 ==
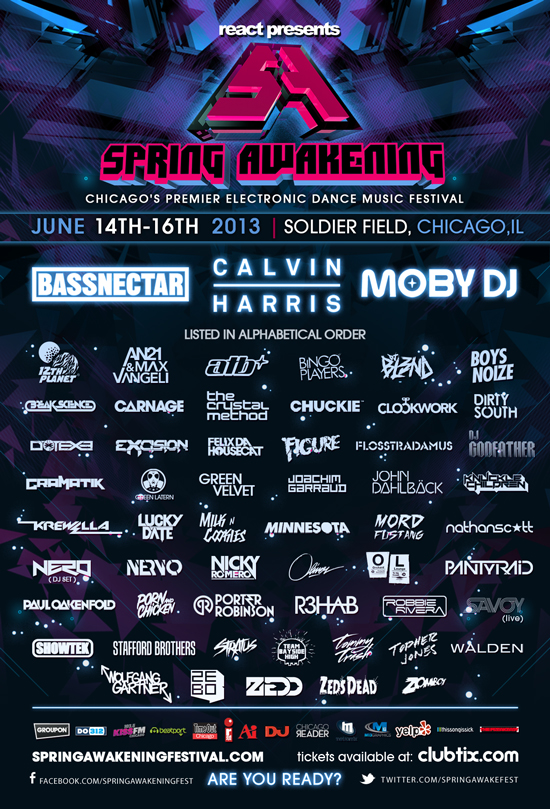
SAMF 2013 lineup

In 2013 SAMF expanded to a three-day festival and was held June 14–16, 2013 at Soldier Field.

This year was much more organized and even bigger. The festival created a three-day "rave". It was attended by kids in vibrant colors, creative outfits, and expressive jewelry to enjoy their favorite artist's music.

Since Spring Awakening expanded to three days, they added another stage, totaling two stages and two tents, for over 100 world renown artists and over 75,000 attendees.

Some of the main performers included Bassnectar, Calvin Harris, Bingo Players, Carnage, Chuckie, Excision, Flosstradamus, Krewella, Nicky Romero, Nervo, Porn and Chicken, Porter Robinson, ZEDD, Zeds Dead and Zomboy.

== 2014 ==
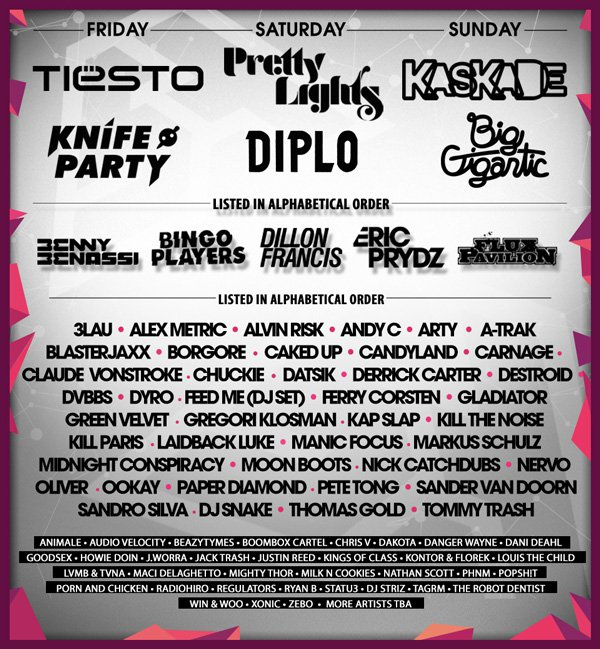
SAMF 2014 lineup

Spring Awakening had its third annual concert on June 13–15, 2014. In the 2014 season, Spring Awakening was one of the few remaining all age festivals. Spring Awakening Music Festival launched SAMF Safe & Sound, an initiative which encouraged attendees to contact security or the wellness team if they felt unsafe. React was purchased by SFX Entertainment last February.

Some of the main artists included Tiesto, Pretty Lights, Diplo, Knife Party, Kaskade, Big Gigantic, Benny Benassi, Bingo Players, Dillon Francis, Eric Prydz, Flux Pavilion, A-Track, Borgore, Caked Up, Carnage, Chuckie, Datsik, DVBBS, Nervo, Dj Snake and more.

== 2015 ==
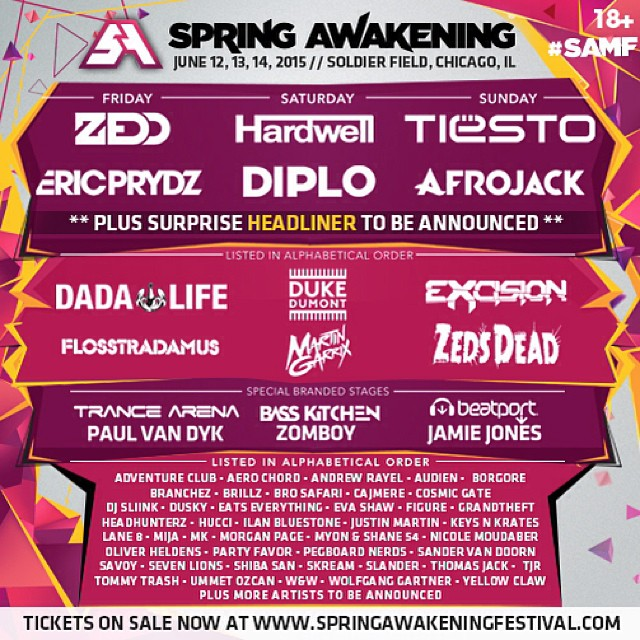
SAMF 2015 lineup

The 2015 SAMF took place June 12–14, 2015 at Soldier Field. Artists included ZEDD, Hardwell, Tiesto, Diplo, Afrojack, Dada Life, Excision, Flosstradamus, Martin Garrix, Zeds Dead, Zomboy, Paul van Dyk, Adventure Club, Borgore, Bro Safari, Headhunterz, Party Favor, Tommy Trash, Yellow Claw and Jack ü.

In 2015 the festival had four stages to better accommodate more than 75 acts. SAMF had also changed its minimum age requirement to 18. The new changes came in the hope of making sure that safety is the number one priority for the fans, artists, and staff. An official spokesperson of SAMF quoted that they, "believe the festival is an experience for adults. This difficult decision was made to promote safety amongst our fans and ensure the best experience for our attendees and future attendees".

A 19-year-old, Steve Vongkoth, died at the event; the death is thought to be drug-related.

== 2016 ==
SAMF 2016 was held June 10–12, 2016 and had five stages, including two main stages for the very first time in the event's history, and hosted a wide array of over 100 acts from across the electronic music spectrum.

The main stage, dubbed the DJ Stage, held performances from Above & Beyond, Kaskade, The Chainsmokers, Steve Aoki, Dillon Francis, Carnage, Nicky Romero, DVBBS, Dash Berlin, and others.

The second main stage, dubbed the Electronic Stage, showed Deadmau5, Zeds Dead, Jamie xx, RL Grime, Flying Lotus, Crystal Castles, Flux Pavilion, Gramatik, Gesaffelstein, A-Trak, Madeon and more.

The Bass Kitchen, Body Language, and Trance Arena stages provided attendees with the opportunity to experience nonstop variety in both music and visual displays. Record label Dirtybird Records, publication DJ Mag and Pete Tong curated the festivities, each hosting a slew of acts from all across the production spectrum throughout the weekend.

In 2016, attendees experienced the event on the sprawling, grassy fields of Addams/Medill Park in the near West side of Chicago. Visitors had public transportation options from both the CTA Pink Line and Green Line trains. The park was accessible from the Ashland, Roosevelt, and the 18th Street CTA buses.

== 2017 ==
The 2017 Spring Awakening was held June 9–11 at Addams/Medill Park in Chicago's southwest side, near Roosevelt Road and Ashland Avenue.

The lineup included Armin van Buuren, Benny Benassi, Paul van Dyk, Audien, Robin Schulz, Paul Oakenfold, and Martin Garrix. There were six different stages with performances from 2:00 PM to 10:00 PM each day.

== See also ==
- List of electronic music festivals
- List of events at Soldier Field
- Ruido Fest
- Riot Fest
- Lollapalooza
- North Coast Music Festival
