= Chicago Trophy =

Soccer tournament in Illinois, US

The Chicago Trophy is a men's soccer (football) tournament which took place for the first time in 2007. The competition included four men's club teams to compete over two days at Soldier Field in Chicago. The tournaments are intended to showcase known clubs from throughout the world, as well as offer clubs popular amongst large, local ethnic communities.

== Format ==
Each of the tournament's four participating club teams played two matches. In standard FIFA fashion, wins will be awarded three points and draws will obtain one point. The club with the most points after its respective matches wins the Chicago Trophy. The organizers (Platinum One) have also announced that bonus points will be awarded for goals scored, presumably to limit the chances of a drawn finish as well as enhance competition.

== 2007 Chicago Trophy ==
The event occurred on Friday, July 27 and Sunday, July 29. Participants included Sevilla FC of Spain, Wisła Kraków of Poland, Club Deportivo Toluca of Mexico, and Reggina Calcio of Italy.

	Friday, July 27	
(Italy) Reggina Calcio	1:1	(Poland) Wisła Kraków
(Spain) Sevilla FC	1:0	(Mexico) Club Toluca

	Sunday, July 29	
(Italy) Reggina Calcio	0:2	(Mexico) Club Toluca
(Spain) Sevilla FC	0:1	(Poland) Wisła Kraków

Wisła Kraków won the first Chicago Trophy tournament

== Future Tournaments ==
The City of Chicago and the competition's promoter have agreed on a three-year contract to hold the event annually through 2009. Despite this supposed contract, there in not much, if any, information to be found for the 2008 and 2009 tournaments.
