= Admiral Gallery =

Admiral Gallery may refer to:

- Daniel V. Gallery (1901–1977), U.S. Navy rear admiral
- Philip D. Gallery (1907–1973), U.S. Navy rear admiral
- William O. Gallery (1904–1981), U.S. Navy admiral
