= University of Illinois at Chicago (disambiguation) =

University of Illinois at Chicago may refer to:

- University of Illinois Chicago, a public university located in the Little Italy/University Village neighborhood of Chicago that is part of the University of Illinois system.
- University of Illinois at Navy Pier, a public university at Navy Pier with a two-year undergraduate program for educating returning World War II veterans before transitioning to the permanent campus that is now the University of Illinois at Chicago.

There are also a private and a public universities located in Chicago that share names similar to the University of Illinois at Chicago and at times are confused with UIC. Neither university is in any way affiliated with the University of Illinois at Chicago:

- The University of Chicago, a private university located in the Hyde Park neighborhood of Chicago. (The abbreviated form for the University of Chicago is "U of C", which sounds similar to UIC.)
- Chicago State University, a public university located in the Pullman neighborhood of Chicago.
