= William Rynne =

Irish Republican fighter

William Rynne, known as "Willie" Rynne, was an Irish Republican who fought in the 1916 Rising. He was born in Clouna South, Ennistymon, County Clare. His parents were David Rynne and Bridget Gallery/Rynne. As a young man he worked in a drapery store in Dundalk, County Louth and joined the Irish Volunteers. He was active in the 1916 Rising. After the rising he was held initially at Richmond Barracks in Dublin. He was transferred to Wakefield Detention centre in England on 12 May 1916. In 1917, as Captain of the Dundalk Volunteers, Rynne was active in the South Armagh by-election protecting Sinn Féin voters from attacks by members of the Ancient Order of Hibernians, who supported the Irish Parliamentary Party candidate. He was captured by the Black and Tans during the Irish War of Independence but escaped while being transported for execution. He moved to the U.S.A. and never returned to Ireland.

== Relatives of William Rynne ==
Rynne's first cousin was Daniel Vincent Gallery, the U.S. Navy captain of aircraft carrier USS Guadalcanal, who captured U-505 on 4 June 1944. Another relative was Michael Rynne, aide-de-camp to Richard Mulcahy, Chief of Staff of the Irish Republican Army, during the war of independence. Michael Rynne was later legal adviser to the Government and then Irish ambassador to Spain under Éamon de Valera's Fianna Fáil government.

== See also ==
- Daniel Vincent Gallery, first cousin
- Philip D. Gallery, first cousin
- William O. Gallery, first cousin
- Frank Rynne, grand nephew
