= Rynne =

Rynne may refer to:

- Frank Rynne is an Irish-born singer, record producer, art curator, filmmaker, writer, and historian.
- Padraig Rynne is an Irish musician and noted concertina player.
- William Rynne, known as "Willie" Rynne, was an Irish Republican who fought in the 1916 Rising.
- Xavier Rynne is the pseudonym of Francis X. Murphy, a Redemptorist chaplain and theology professor who wrote about the Second Vatican Council.
