= Hammer/Palmer Mansion =

Historic mansion in Chicago, Illinois

Coordinates: 41°49′39.7″N 87°37′3.5″W

- Interactive map of the Hammer/Palmer Mansion area

General information
- Type: Mansion
- Location: Chicago, Illinois, U.S.

The Hammer / Palmer Mansion is a historic mansion at 3654-3656 S. Dr. Martin Luther King Jr. Drive in the Bronzeville section of Chicago.

It was designed by William Wilson Clay of the firm Wheelock and Clay (Otis Leonard Wheelock) in the Queen Anne style and built in 1885. It is considered endangered.

It was built for and home to justice D. Harry Hammer. It was also home to Lu Palmer and his wife, Jorja English Palmer. Obsidian House proposed renovating it opening it as a home for its collection on Black journalists. The organization secured a $1.25 million loan to purchase the property in 2021.

https://secretchicago.com/lu-palmer-mansion/
