= Wheeler–Kohn House =

Historic house in Chicago, Illinois

- Wheeler-Kohn House
- U.S. National Register of Historic Places
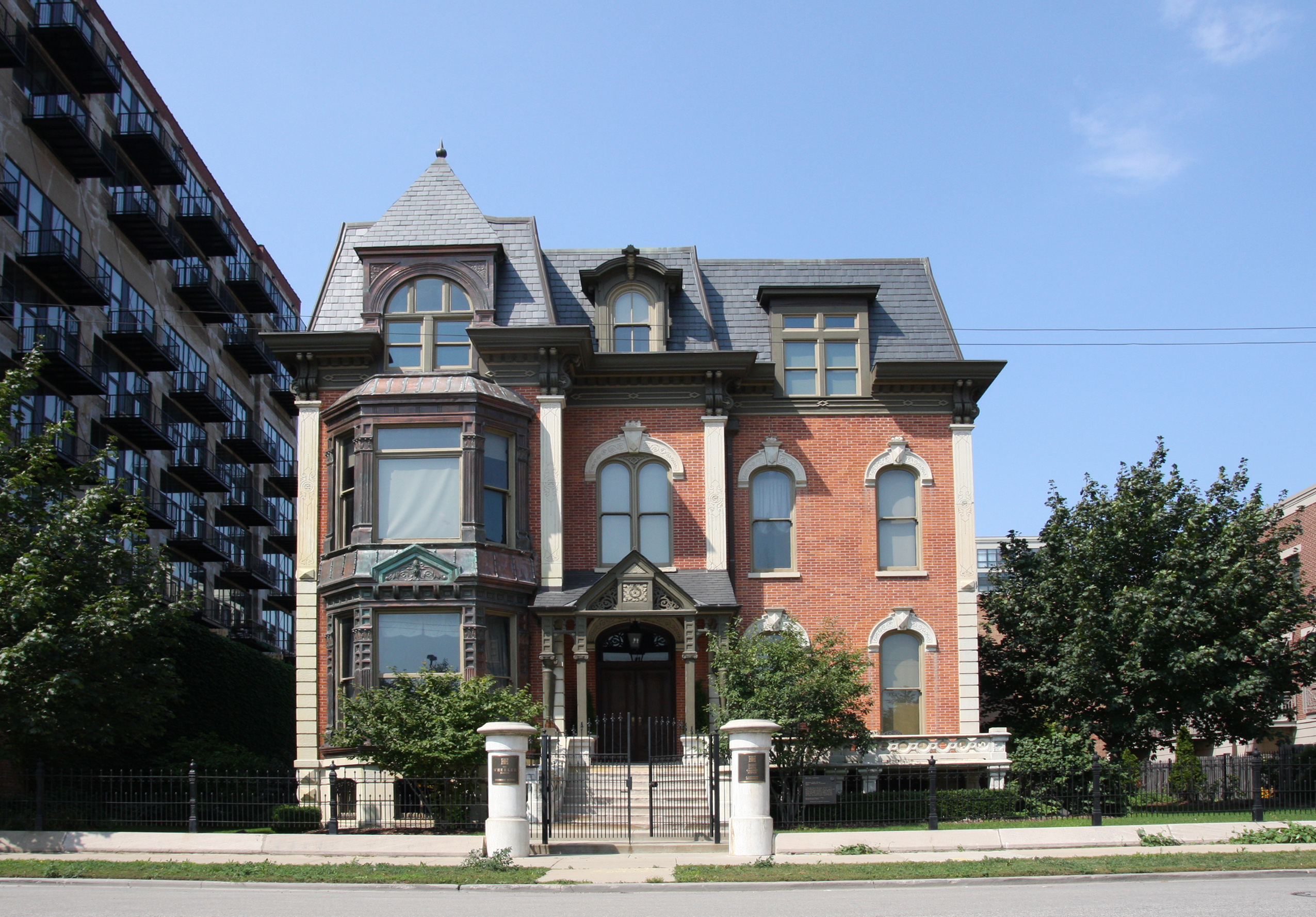
- Wheeler-Kohn House

- Location within Chicago metropolitan area Location within Illinois Location within the United States
- Location: 2018 S. Calumet Ave., Chicago, Illinois
- Coordinates: 41°51′18″N 87°37′10″W
- Architect: Wheelock, D.L.
- Architectural style: Second Empire, Queen Anne
- NRHP reference No.: 99000975
- Added to NRHP: August 12, 1999

The Wheeler–Kohn House is a Queen Anne and Second Empire Style house in the Near South Side neighborhood of Chicago, Illinois, United States. The house was built in 1870 by Otis L. Wheelock for Calvin Wheeler.

It was designated a Chicago Landmark on February 5, 1998, and it was listed on the U.S. National Register of Historic Places in 1999. The house currently serves as one of Chicago's few intimate bed and breakfast hotels, operating as the Wheeler Mansion.
