= Oscar Taylor House =

Historic house in Illinois, United States

- U.S. National Register of Historic Places
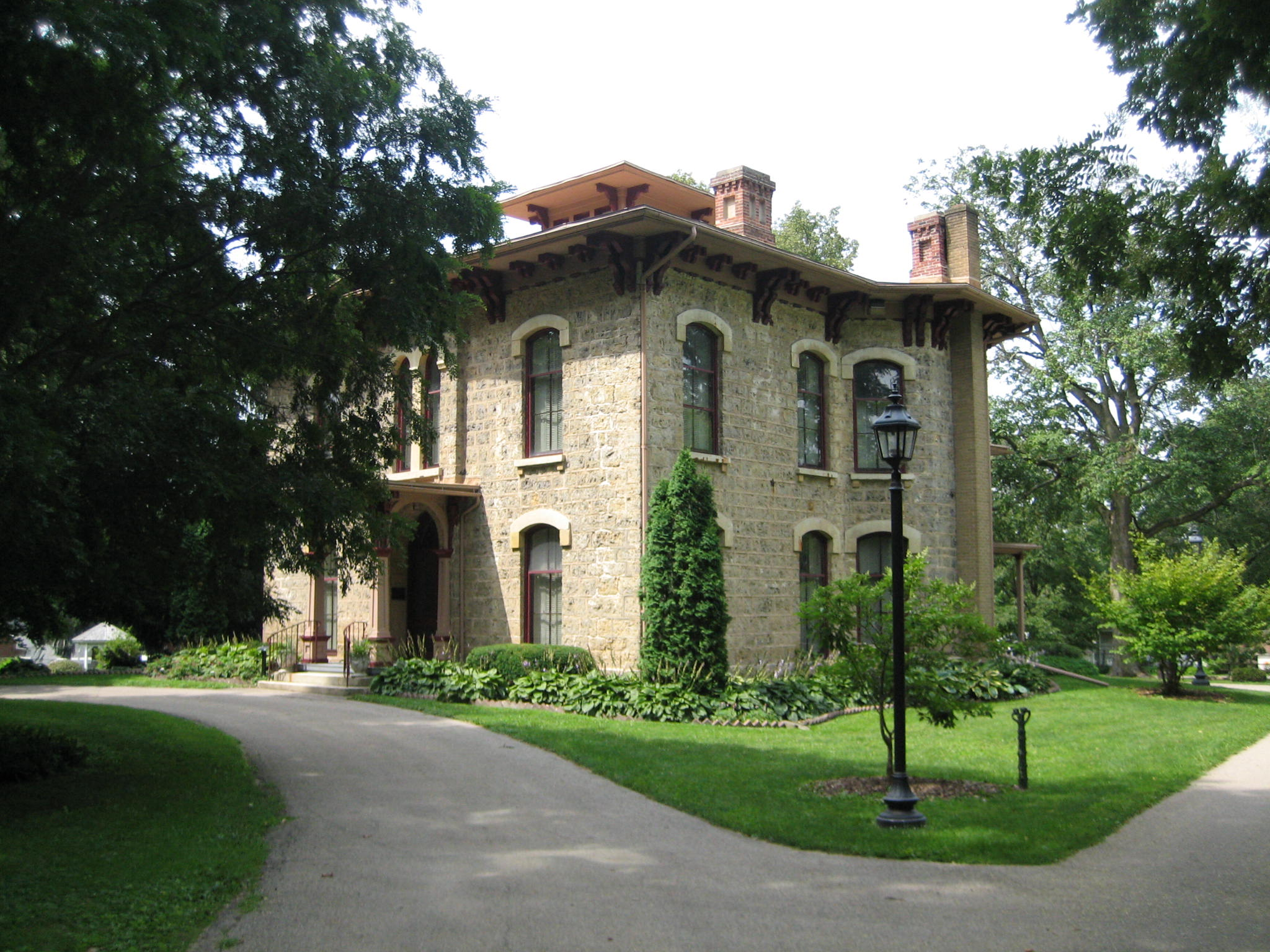

- Location within Illinois Location within the United States
- Interactive map showing the location of Oscar Taylor House
- Location: 1440 S. Carroll Ave., Freeport, Illinois
- Coordinates: 42°17′4″N 89°36′51″W
- Area: less than one acre
- Built: 1857
- Architect: Otis L. Wheelock
- Architectural style: Italianate
- NRHP reference No.: 84001165
- Added to NRHP: May 11, 1984

The Oscar Taylor House is a historic house in the city of Freeport, Illinois. The house was built in 1857 and served as a "station" on the Underground Railroad during the American Civil War. It was added to the National Register of Historic Places in 1984.

== History ==
The Oscar Taylor House was built for Freeport banker and attorney Oscar Taylor in 1857. Taylor, the son of Speaker of the House John W. Taylor, opened Freeport's first bank in 1852. The house became a social and cultural center in Freeport, hosting many prominent guests. During the American Civil War the house was used as a station on the Underground Railroad. Fugitive slaves were hidden in the basement behind a secret door fronted with shelving. The door still remains. The house was in the Taylor family until 1944 when it was gifted to form the Stephenson County Historical Society and turned into a historic house museum.

== Architecture ==
The Taylor House is an Italianate stone house of locally quarried, rough-faced limestone. It was designed by Otis L. Wheelock of the Chicago firm, Boyington and Wheelock. The house was the first of Freeport's large houses. The house is two stories tall with a full basement and full attic. It has a symmetrical plan but its symmetry is not plainly obvious because of the building's varied composition. It is topped by a cupola above and a projecting kitchen wing below, and also possesses projecting polygonal bays and a rear sunroom. These factors make the structure's symmetry difficult to discern.

== Historic significance ==
The Oscar Taylor House is significant in the areas of commerce and architecture. In the commerce area it is significant because of its association with Oscar Taylor, a prominent local businessman. It is also a good example of an Italianate mansion and was important as a stop on the Underground Railroad. The Oscar Taylor House was added to the National Register of Historic Places May 11, 1984.
