= USS Gallery =

Oliver Hazard Perry-class frigate

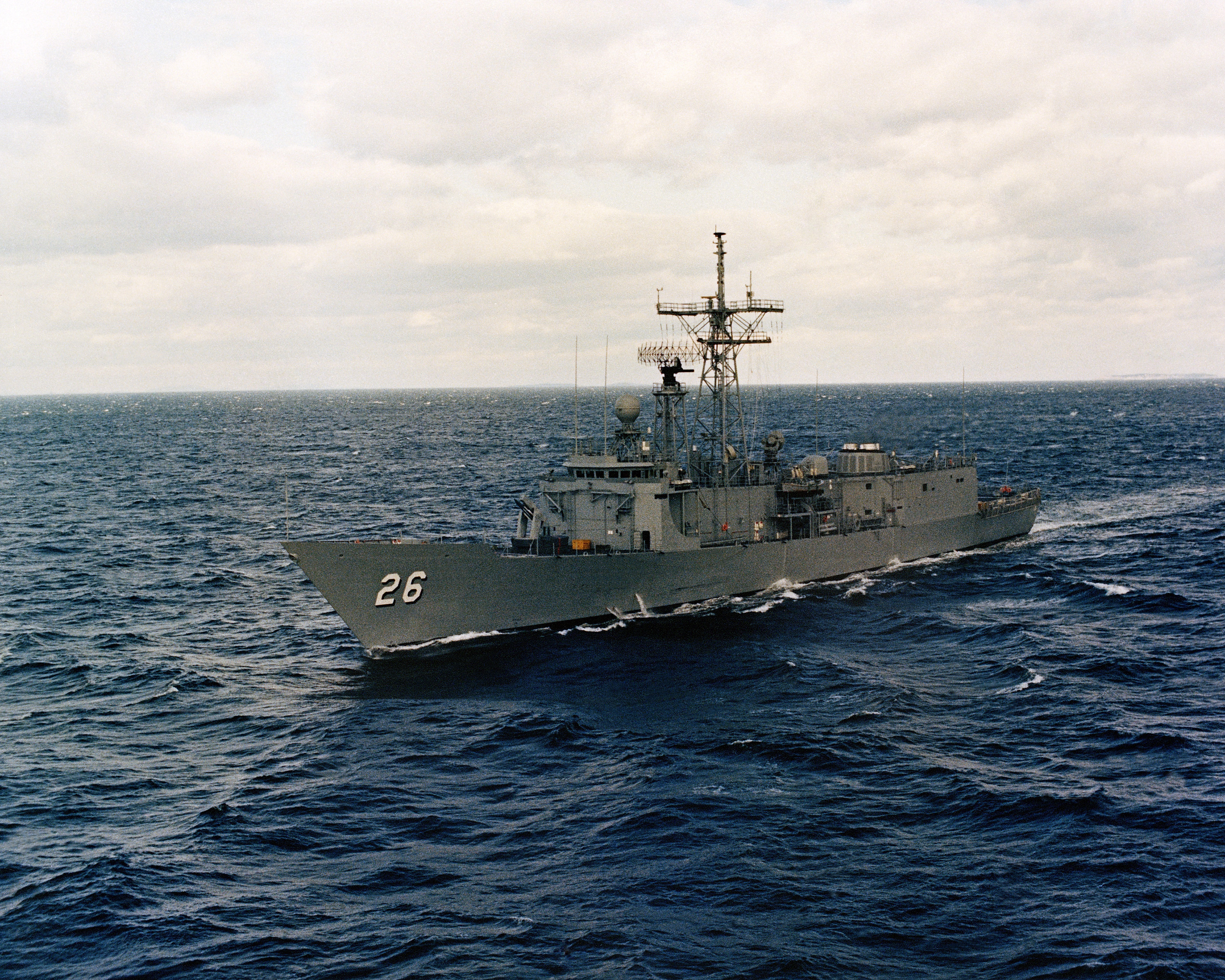
- USS Gallery (FFG-26)

History

United States
- Name: Gallery
- Namesake: Rear Admirals, brothers, Philip D. Gallery, Daniel V. Gallery, William O. Gallery
- Ordered: 28 February 1977
- Builder: Bath Iron Works, Bath, Maine
- Laid down: 17 May 1980
- Launched: 20 December 1980
- Sponsored by: Co-sponsored by Mrs. Philip D. Gallery and Mrs. Daniel V. Gallery
- Acquired: 10 November 1981
- Commissioned: 5 December 1981
- Decommissioned: 14 June 1996
- Stricken: 14 June 1996
- Home port: Mayport, Florida and Pascagoula, Mississippi
- Identification: Hull symbol:FFG-26; Code letters:NDPG
- Motto: "Manu Forti"; (With A Strong Hand)
- Fate: transferred to Egyptian Navy, 25 September 1996
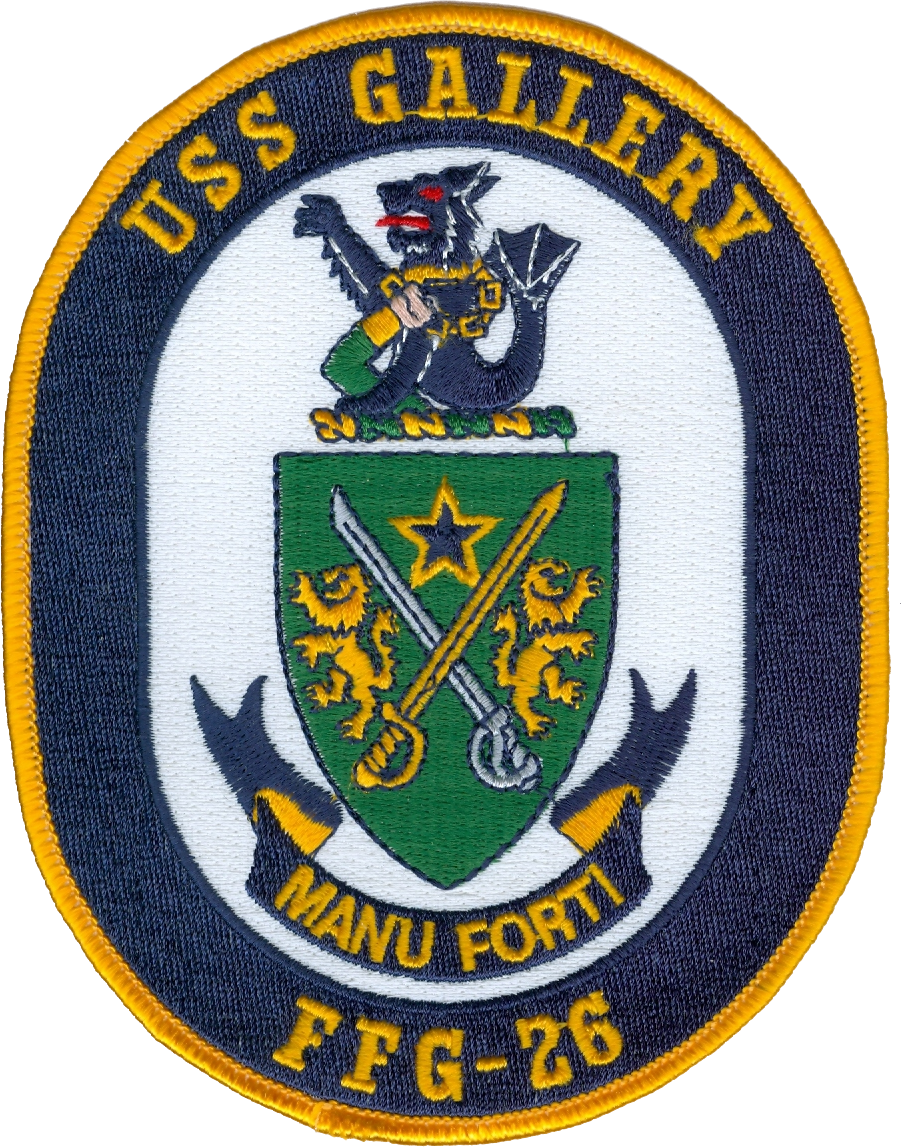
- Badge

Egypt
- Name: Taba
- Namesake: Town of Taba, Egypt
- Acquired: 25 September 1996
- Commissioned: 13 July 1997
- Identification: F916
- Status: in active service, as of 2018

General characteristics
- Class & type: Oliver Hazard Perry-class frigate
- Displacement: 4,100 long tons (4,200 t), full load
- Length: 445 feet (136 m), overall
- Beam: 45 feet (14 m)
- Draft: 22 feet (6.7 m)
- Propulsion: 2 × General Electric LM2500-30 gas turbines generating 41,000 shp (31 MW) through a single shaft and variable pitch propeller; 2 × Auxiliary Propulsion Units, 350 hp (260 kW) retractable electric azimuth thrusters for maneuvering and docking.
- Speed: over 29 knots (54 km/h)
- Range: 5,000 nautical miles at 18 knots (9,300 km at 33 km/h)
- Complement: 15 officers and 190 enlisted, plus SH-60 LAMPS detachment of roughly six officer pilots and 15 enlisted maintainers
- Sensors & processing systems: AN/SPS-49 air-search radar; AN/SPS-55 surface-search radar; CAS and STIR fire-control radar; AN/SQS-56 sonar.
- Electronic warfare & decoys: AN/SLQ-32
- Armament: As built: 1 × OTO Melara Mk 75 76 mm/62 caliber naval gun; 2 × Mk 32 triple-tube (324 mm) launchers for Mark 46 torpedoes; 1 × Vulcan Phalanx CIWS; 4 × .50-cal (12.7 mm) machine guns.; 1 × Mk 13 Mod 4 single-arm launcher for Harpoon anti-ship missiles and SM-1MR Standard anti-ship/air missiles (40 round magazine); Note: As of 2004, Mk 13 systems removed from all active US vessels of this class.
- Aircraft carried: 1 × SH-2F LAMPS I

USS Gallery (FFG-26), eighteenth ship of the Oliver Hazard Perry class of guided-missile frigates, was named for three brothers: Rear Admiral Daniel V. Gallery (1901–1977), Rear Admiral William O. Gallery (1904–1981), and Rear Admiral Philip D. Gallery (1907–1973). Ordered from Bath Iron Works, Bath, Maine, on 28 February 1977 as part of the FY77 program, Gallery was laid down on 17 May 1980, launched on 20 December 1980, co-sponsored by Mrs. Philip D. Gallery and Mrs. Daniel V. Gallery, and commissioned on 5 December 1981. Decommissioned and stricken on 14 June 1996, she was transferred to Egypt on 25 September 1996 as Taba (F916). As of 2007, she remained in active service with the Egyptian Navy.

Gallery was the first ship of that name in the US Navy.

== Coat of arms ==
=== Shield ===
The colors green and gold, and the rampant lions have been adapted from a personal device of the Gallery family. The lions, symbolic of courage and strength, face in different directions indicating that the brothers for whom this ship is named, served in both theaters of operation during World War II. The star alludes to their many awards, and denote excellence and achievement. The crossed swords, adapted from the Officer and Enlisted badges, allude to Naval Combat Operations.

=== Crest ===
Blue and gold are the colors traditionally associated with the Navy. The upraised arm in green and gold is an adaptation from the Gallery family device. The collared and chained sea-wolf symbolizes the only capture of a U-boat from the German wolf-packs during World War II. The crest also symbolizes the curbing and destruction of the enemy sub activities in the Pacific theatre.

=== Motto ===
Manu Forti – "With a Strong Hand"
