= Otis Leonard Wheelock =

American architect (1816–1893)

Otis Leonard Wheelock (1816 - 1893) was an architect in upstate New York and Chicago. He and his wife had two adopted children, a son Harry B. Wheelock who was an architect and a daughter.

George H. Harlow studied under him.

He was a partner of W. W. Boyington in the firm of Boyington & Wheelock. He also partnered with William Wilson Clay. George Beaumont and Minard Lefever Beers are architects who worked at his firms.

== Works ==
- Paddock Arcade (1850) at Washington St. between Arsenal and Store Sts. in Watertown, New York (NRHP listed by Wheelock, Otis L.)
- Oscar Taylor House (1857), NRHP listed
- Union Park Congregational Church and Carpenter Chapel’s Revival chapel
- Burbank–Livingston–Griggs House (1862), NRHP listed
- Groesbeck House (1869), 1304 W. Washington Boulevard, a Chicago Landmark
- Wheeler–Kohn House (1870), NRHP listed
- 2550 S. Michigan (demolished)
- 2808 S. Prairie (1886) with William Wilson Clay
- 2919 S. Prairie for Frank Granger Logan (demolished)
- Michigan and Prairie Avenue mansions with
- Wheeler Kohn Home at 2018 S. Calumet Ave. a Chicago landmark restored and operated as a bed and breakfast
- Henry A. Chapin House (1882), 508 E. Main St. Niles, MI Wheelock & Clay NRHP listed
