= Mary Onahan Gallery =

American writer, critic, and editor

Mary Josephine Onahan
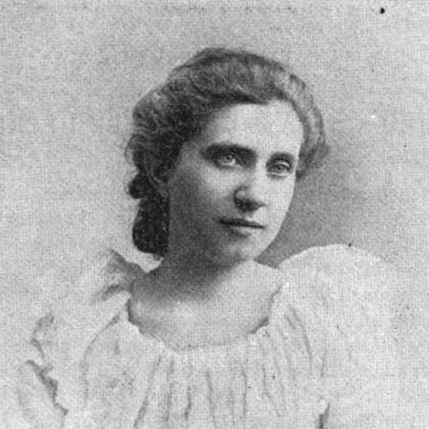
- Onahan in 1897
- Born: Mary Josephine Onahan; July 22, 1866; Chicago, Illinois, U.S.
- Died: January 12, 1941 (aged 74); Milwaukee, Wisconsin, U.S.
- Resting place: Calvary Cemetery, Evanston, Illinois, U.S.
- Other name: Molly
- Education: Sacred Heart Academy
- Occupations: Writer, editor
- Spouse: Daniel Vincent Gallery (m. 1898)
- Children: Daniel V., Jr., John Ireland, William Onahan, Mary Margaret, Phillip Daly, Martha Nancy
- Writing career
- Language: English
- Subject: Catholicism

Mary Josephine Onahan Gallery (née, Onahan, known as Molly; July 22, 1866 – January 12, 1941) was an American writer, critic and editor. She primarily wrote articles for newspapers and magazines. Some of her work had a religious focus. Gallery was also the mother of three rear admirals in the U.S. Navy.

== Biography ==
=== Early life and education ===
Mary Josephine Onahan was born in Chicago, Illinois, July 22, 1866. She was the daughter of William J. Onahan, a Chicago civic leader, and Margaret (Duffy) Onahan. There were five older siblings, all of whom died in infancy.

Gallery was educated at the Sacred Heart Academy in Chicago, graduating at an early age. Her aunt was one of the most valued and accomplished members of the order. Her family then moved temporarily to St. Louis, Missouri, where she continued her education. Gallery was also self-taught, reading many books from William Onahan's extensive library. At the World's Columbian Exposition held in Chicago in 1893, Gallery attended a congress of women's representatives.

=== Career ===
Mary Gallery was a contributor to the Chicago daily papers, with many of her articles republished by the dailies in New York City. She believed that one of the important duties of American Catholics was to see that the church was done justice to in the columns of the daily press. Gallery also edited many Catholic newspapers and wrote numerous magazine articles. These articles covered literary, musical and philanthropic topics. Gallery took her greatest interest in human nature stories about the practical betterment of the world, for, as one writer said of her:— "'Molly' Onahan would take more pleasure in the approving whoop of a lot of 'newsies' than in prim congratulations from all the prelates of a general council."

Gallery also wrote verse, but did not publicize it. Her papers at the Representative Women's and the Catholic Congress were among the best read. Of her style, Author Walter Lecky said:

Although the youngest of Chicago's literary coterie, she is a writer of marked ability. There is a graceful mingling of strength and delicacy in her writings. If she will have patience, learn to use the pruning hook, her future is assured. The product of Ireland in America, a Celt in artistic environment—the only environment natural to a Celt—she points to what the Celt must be before another century lapses.

== Personal life ==
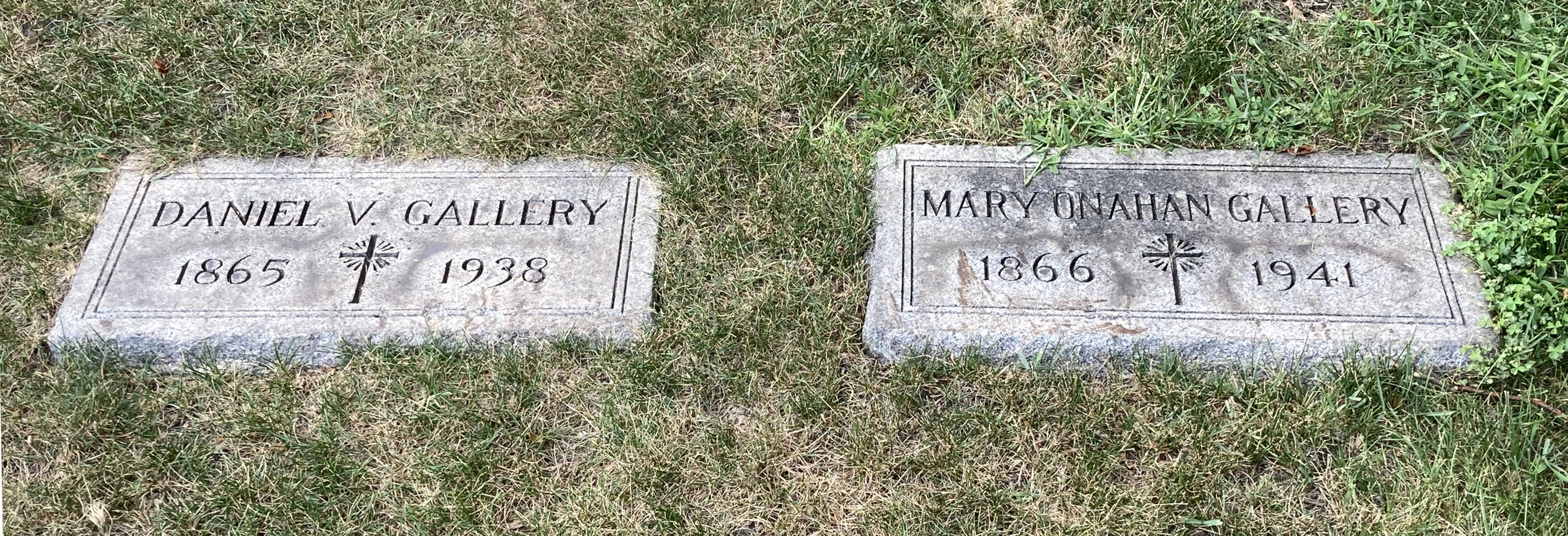
Graves of Daniel Vincent and Mary Onahan Gallery at Calvary Cemetery

On September 5, 1898, Mary Gallery married Daniel Vincent Gallery, a Chicago lawyer, at the Cathedral of the Holy Name in Chicago. According to the New York Times, the marriage was an elopement. Her parents had disapproved of Mary dating Daniel, so the couple kept their plans secret. When a reporter contacted William Onahan for comment, he called the story preposterous and a hoax. Onahan then discovered a letter from Mary that revealed their plans.

Mary and Daniel Gallery had six children:

- U.S. Navy Rear Admiral Daniel V. Gallery, Jr.
- John Ireland Gallery
- Rear Admiral William Onahan Gallery
- Mary Margaret Gallery
- Navy Rear Admiral Phillip Daly Gallery
- Martha Nancy Gallery

Mary Gallery died in Milwaukee, Wisconsin on January 12, 1941. She was buried at Calvary Cemetery in Evanston, Illinois.

== Selected works ==
=== By Mary Josephine Onahan ===
- "John Mitchel's Daughter", Catholic World, 1886
- "Chicago's White City by the Sea", The Irish Monthly, 1893
- Catholic Women's Part in Philanthropy, 1893
- "An Incident in Old Bologna, The Irish Monthly, 1895
- "Pierre Loti", Catholic World, 1895

=== By Mary Onahan Gallery ===
- Life of William J. Onahan : stories of men who made Chicago, 1929
