= Ruth M. Rothstein CORE Center =

Coordinates: 41°52′28.2″N 87°40′37.7″W

The Ruth M. Rothstein CORE Center is a medical facility in the Illinois Medical District, located at 2020 West Harrison Street in Chicago. It was founded by the Cook County Bureau of Health Services, and cares for people with diseases such as HIV/AIDS. In its mission statement, it explains its goals as:

to provide the highest quality care for persons and families affected by infectious diseases, with respect, dignity and compassion, without regard to the ability to pay; to ensure a patient-centered and consumer-guided environment; and to seek to better understand and to prevent these diseases through education and research.

== Design and language access ==
The center was designed with the involvement of "clients and providers". Its design could be seen as futuristic, with glass and white walls throughout.

To address language access needs of diverse-linguistic populations, the center designated a Bilingual Clinic staffed with Spanish-speaking physicians and medical staff for Spanish-speaking consumers. An in-house Spanish language interpreter is staffed to assist patients with limited English proficiency at the facility. Interpreter services through telephonic and video remote interpreting are available for the deaf or hard of hearing and for less common spoken languages.

== Education ==
As well as carrying out its duties to the community, the center provides medical tutoring about HIV/AIDS to local medics. The center has also made attempts to educate the community about the nature of such diseases, with education resources readily available at the site.

== Care ==
The center focuses on social care, primary care and special care:

=== Social care ===
This involves subjects such as support groups and counselling programs. Legal assistance is also provided.

=== Primary care ===
Primary Care at the CORE Center involves screening for sexually transmitted diseases (STDs) and care units for HIV.

=== Special care ===
A wide range of special care is provided:

- Aerosolized pentamidine
- Bone marrow aspiration
- Bronchoscopy
- Chemotherapy
- Colposcopy
- Diagnostic laboratory
- Endoscopy
- Gastroenterology/Hepatology
- Gynecology
- Hematology
- Infectious disease consultations
- Infusion and observation
- Neurology
- Nutrition
- Obstetrics
- Oncology
- Ophthalmology
- Pain management
- Pharmaceutical care

== Research ==
=== Clinical studies ===
The CORE center performs some clinical studies into HIV/AIDS. These are first approved by the Research Committee and the Scientific Committee/Institutional Review Board. The studies are also observed by the Food and Drug Administration. Participants are then required to sign a consent form informing them of any possible danger. All studies are closely monitored by qualified nurses. Not everyone can participate: requirements have to be met so that the staff feel that it is safe to carry out the study.

=== Survey and observational ===
Surveys and observational studies are carried out to investigate the effects of diseases. As with the clinical studies, the participants must first meet requirements set by the center.
