= Groesbeck House =

Historic house in Illinois, United States

Coordinates: 41°53′0″N 87°39′36″W

- U.S. National Register of Historic Places
- Chicago Landmark
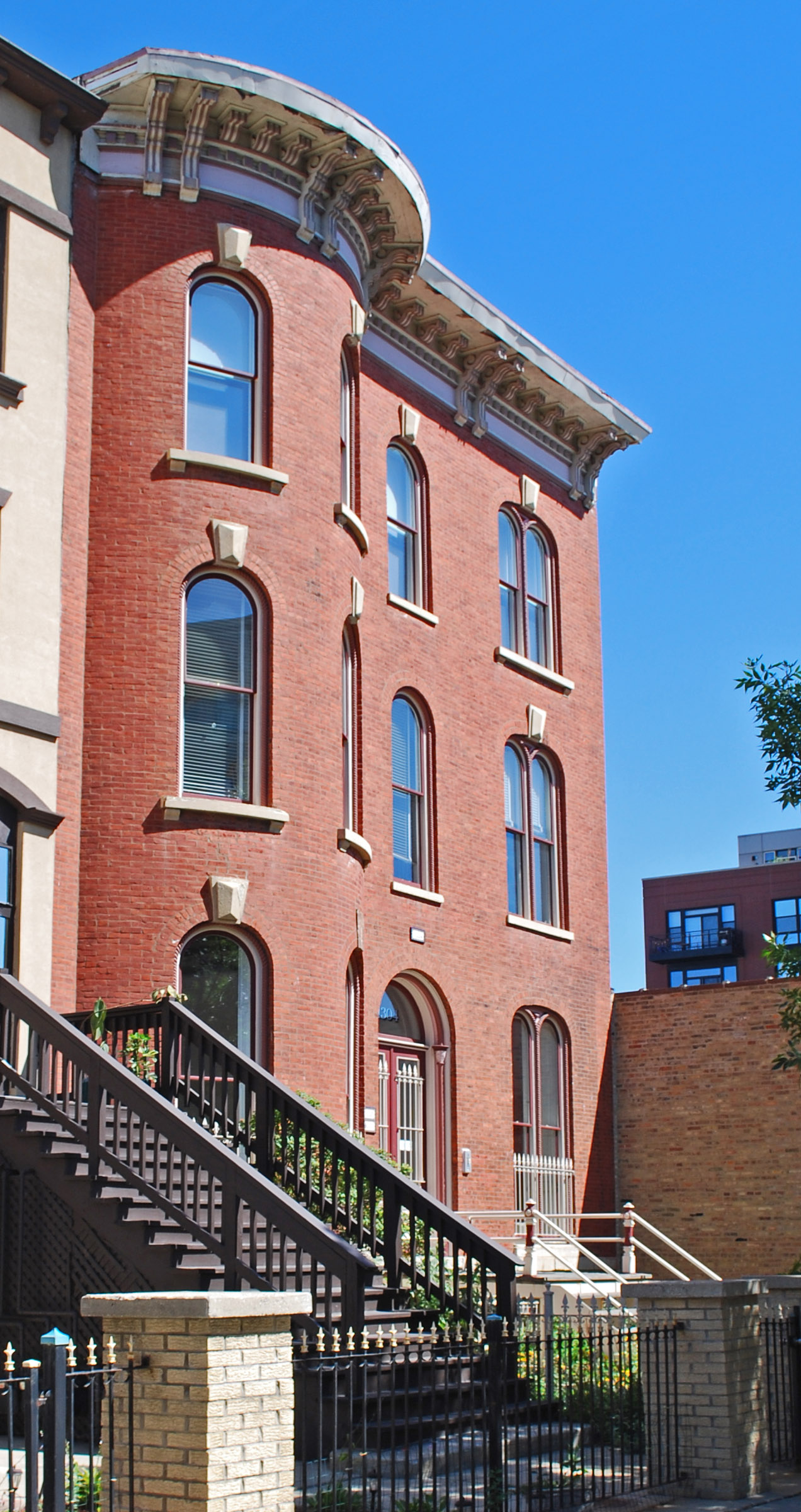
- Location: Chicago, Illinois, United States
- Built: 1869
- Architectural style: Italianate
- NRHP reference No.: 92001841

Significant dates
- Added to NRHP: February 4, 1993
- Designated CHICL: January 12, 1993

The Groesbeck House is an Italianate style house located at 1304 West Washington Boulevard in Chicago, Illinois, United States. The house was built in 1869 by Otis L. Wheelock for Abraham Groesbeck. It was designated a Chicago Landmark on January 12, 1993.
