= Illinois Medical District =

American special-use zoning district

Coordinates: 41°52′5″N 87°40′30″W

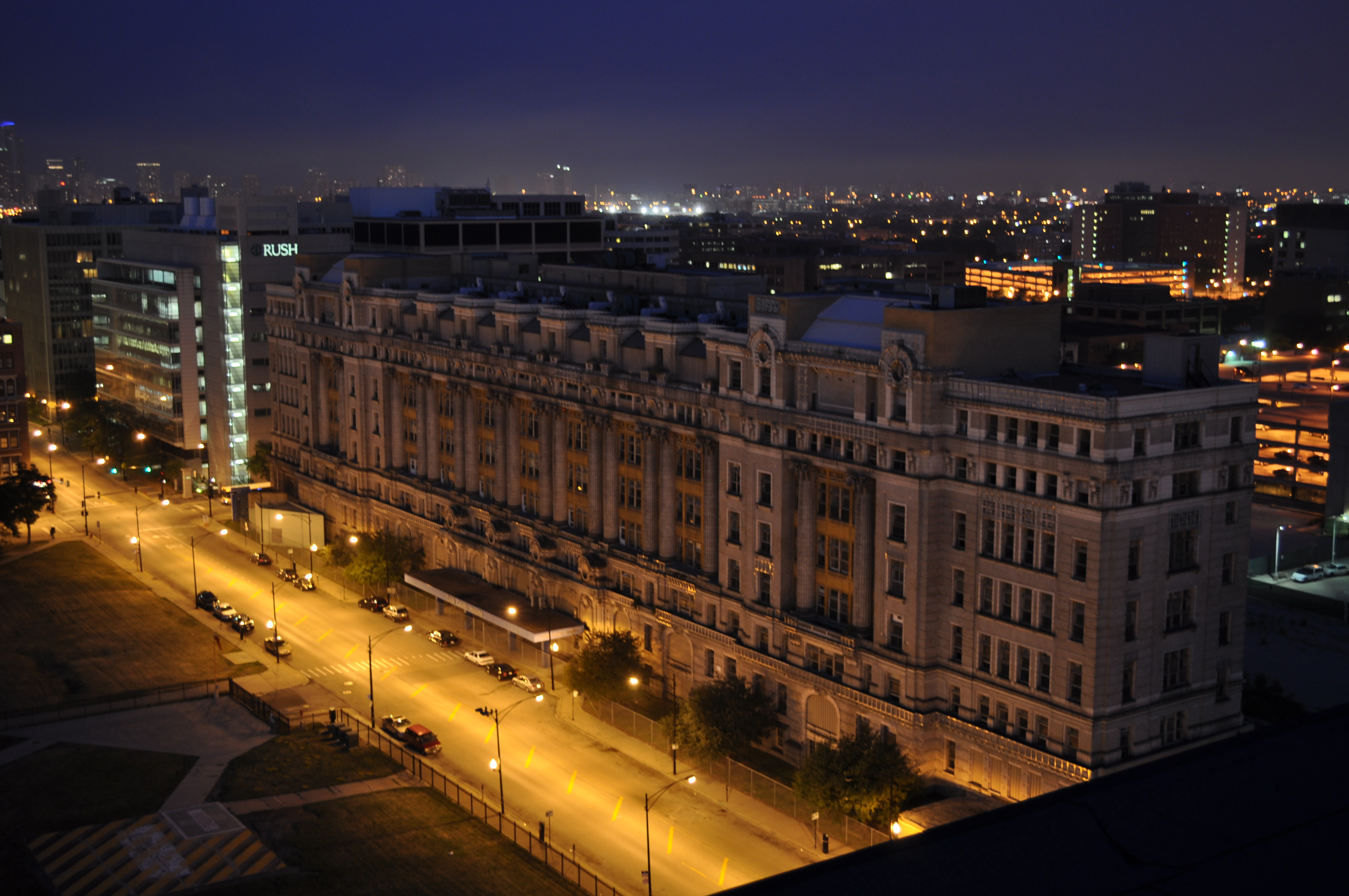
Cook County Hospital, 1912 building, overhead in the Illinois Medical District, Chicago

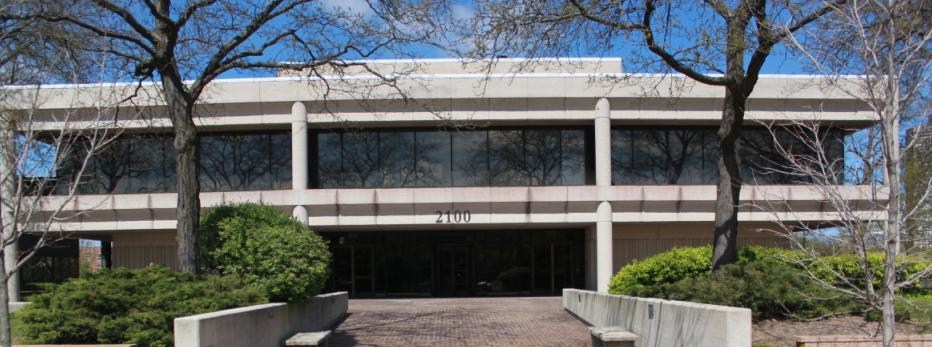
IMDC Headquarters in Chicago

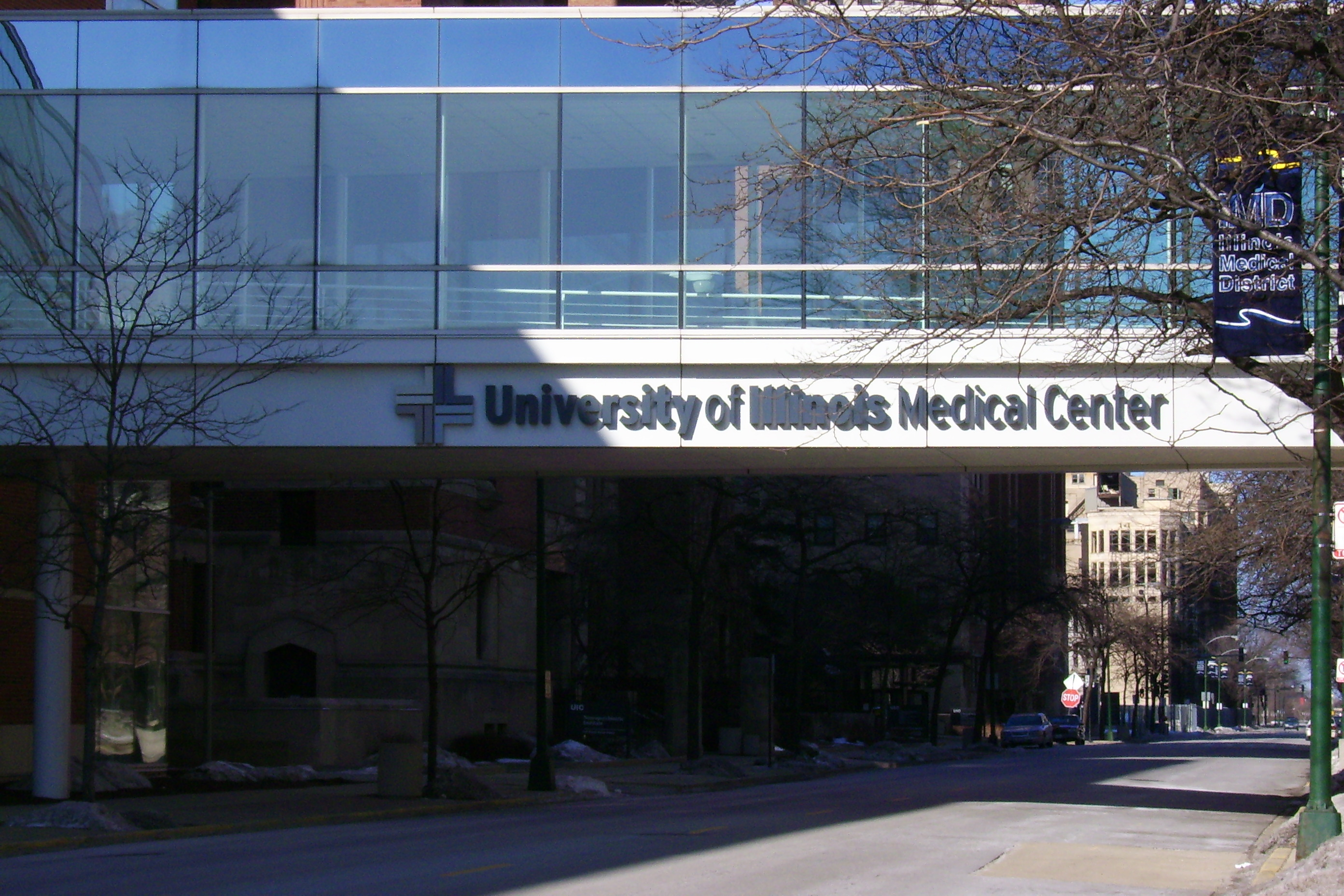
University of Illinois Medical Center is part of the IMD

The Illinois Medical District (IMD) is a special-use zoning district two miles west of the Loop in Chicago, Illinois. The Illinois Medical District consists of 560 acres of medical research facilities, labs, a biotechnology business incubator, a raw development area, four major hospitals, two medical universities, and more than 40 health care related facilities. The IMD has more than 29,000 employees, 50,000 daily visitors and generates $3.4 billion in economic opportunity. The Illinois Medical District is the largest medical district in North America, and has the most diverse patient population on the continent.

Four major hospitals anchor the IMD, including the Jesse Brown VA Medical Center; Rush University Medical Center; The John H. Stroger, Jr., Hospital of Cook County; and The University of Illinois Hospital & Health Sciences System.

Governed by seven appointed commissioners, the district is focused on expanding innovation in healthcare, medical science, information technology, biotechnology, medical devices, clean technology and supportive assisted living. In 2013, the IMD conducted a strategic plan in which four key priorities were identified so that the IMD could remain a leader in patient care and medical research while utilizing its diversity and assets to further drive economic growth. These four areas are what the IMD uses to filter new projects and plans: Infrastructure & Development, Community Health, Translational Research and Clinical Data.

Member institutions include:

- Chicago Children's Advocacy Center
- Chicago Lighthouse
- Easter Seals of Metropolitan Chicago
- FBI
- Furnetic
- Hektoen Institute
- Illinois Eye and Ear Infirmary
- Illinois State Police Forensic Science Center
- IMD Guest House Foundation
- Jesse Brown VA Medical Center
- John H. Stroger, Jr. Hospital of Cook County (Cook County Hospital)
- Rush University Medical Center
- Ruth M. Rothstein CORE Center
- University of Illinois Medical Center

== West Side Grounds and the Chicago Cubs ==
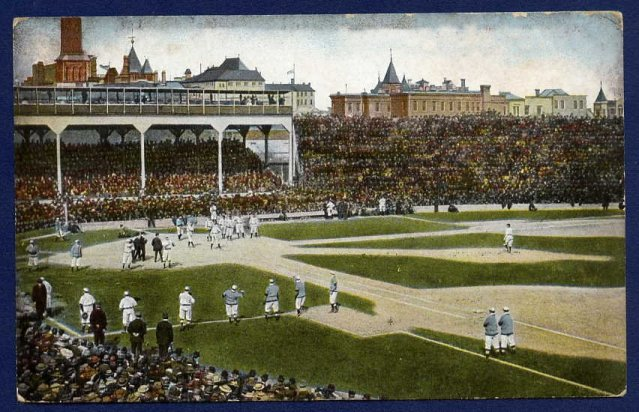

A block within the Illinois Medical District bounded by Taylor, Wood, Polk and Lincoln (now Wolcott) Streets was home to the Chicago Cubs baseball club from 1893 to 1915, at the 16,000 capacity West Side Park. The first game was held on May 14, 1893 (Cincinnati 13, Chicago 12) and the last game was on October 3, 1915 (Chicago 7, St. Louis 2). On October 9, 1906, the ballpark hosted the first intra-urban World Series Game between the Chicago Cubs and the Chicago White Sox.
