= Daniel V. Gallery =

United States admiral (1901–1977)

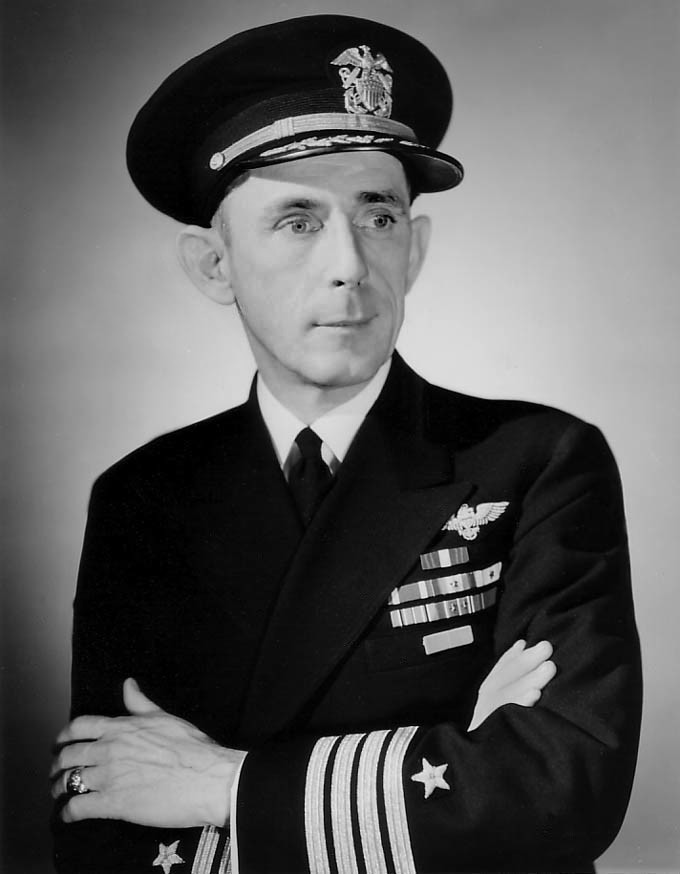
- Gallery in 1945
- Born: July 10, 1901; Chicago, Illinois, U.S.
- Died: January 16, 1977 (aged 75); Bethesda, Maryland, U.S.
- Burial place: Arlington National Cemetery
- Relatives: Mother: Mary Onahan Gallery; Brothers: Philip D. Gallery, William O. Gallery
- Military career
- Allegiance: United States
- Branch: United States Navy
- Service years: 1917–1960
- Rank: Rear admiral
- Commands: U.S. Navy Fleet Air Base, Reykjavik, Iceland; USS Guadalcanal; USS Hancock; Tenth Naval District
- Conflicts: World War II: Battle of the Atlantic
- Awards: Navy Distinguished Service Medal; Bronze Star

Daniel Vincent Gallery (July 10, 1901 – January 16, 1977) was a rear admiral in the United States Navy. He saw extensive action during World War II, fighting U-boats during the Battle of the Atlantic, where his most notable achievement was the June 4, 1944 capture of the German submarine U-505. After the war, Gallery was a prolific author of fiction and non-fiction. During the post-war military cutbacks, he wrote a series of articles criticizing the heavy reductions being made to the U.S. Navy. These articles placed him at odds with the administration during the episode which became known as the Revolt of the Admirals.

== Early life and career ==
Daniel was the son of Daniel Vincent Gallery (born Chicago, July 19, 1865), lawyer, and Mary Onahan Gallery, writer. In 1917, at the age of 16, Gallery entered the U.S. Naval Academy at Annapolis, Maryland. He graduated a year early, in 1920, and competed in the 1920 Olympics in Antwerp on the U.S. wrestling team.

He had three younger brothers, all of whom had careers in the U.S. Navy. Two brothers, William O. Gallery and Philip D. Gallery, also rose to the rank of rear admiral. The fourth brother, John Ireland Gallery, was a Catholic priest and Navy chaplain. Their grandfather Daniel, born about 1839, emigrated to the U.S. from Ennistymon, County Clare, Ireland, in the mid- to late- 1800s.

Gallery was an early naval aviator. He flew seaplanes, torpedo bombers and amphibians. In the late 1930s, he won at the National Air Races in a race-tuned Douglas TBD Devastator torpedo plane. In 1941, while the U.S. was still neutral, he was assigned as the Naval Attaché at the U.S. Embassy in Great Britain. While in Britain, he earned his flight pay by ferrying Supermarine Spitfires from the factory to Royal Air Force aerodromes. He liked to claim that he was the only U.S. Navy aviator who flew Spitfires during the Battle of Britain, but they were unarmed.

== World War II ==
In 1942, Gallery took command of the Fleet Air Base in Reykjavík, Iceland.

In 1943, Gallery was named captain of the escort carrier USS Guadalcanal, which he commissioned. In January 1944, he commanded antisubmarine Task Group 21.12 (TG 21.12) out of Norfolk, Virginia, with Guadalcanal as the flagship. TG 21.12 sank the German submarine U-544.

In March 1944, Task Group 22.3 was formed with Guadalcanal as the flagship. On this cruise, 24-hour flight operations from escort carriers hunted U-boats, which had begun remaining submerged during daylight to avoid carrier-based aircraft. On April 9, the task group sank U-515, commanded by U-boat ace Kapitänleutnant Werner Henke. After prolonged depth charging, the submarine was forced to the surface among the attacking ships and the surviving crew abandoned ship. The deserted U-515 was hammered by rockets and gunfire before she finally sank. The next night, aircraft from the task group caught U-68 on the surface, in broad moonlight, and sank her with one survivor, a lookout caught on-deck when the U-boat crash dived.

=== U-505 ===
On the next cruise of TG 22.3, Gallery took the unusual step of forming boarding parties, in case of another chance to capture a U-boat arose. On June 4, 1944, the task group crossed paths with U-505 off the coast of Africa. U-505 was spotted running on the surface by two Grumman F4F Wildcat fighters from Guadalcanal. Her captain, Oberleutnant Harald Lange, dived the boat to avoid the fighters. But they could see the submerged submarine and vectored destroyers onto her track. The experienced antisubmarine warfare team laid down patterns of depth charges that shook U-505 up badly, popping relief valves and breaking gaskets, resulting in water sprays in her engine room. The captain ordered the crew to abandon ship, during which scuttling measures were not completed.

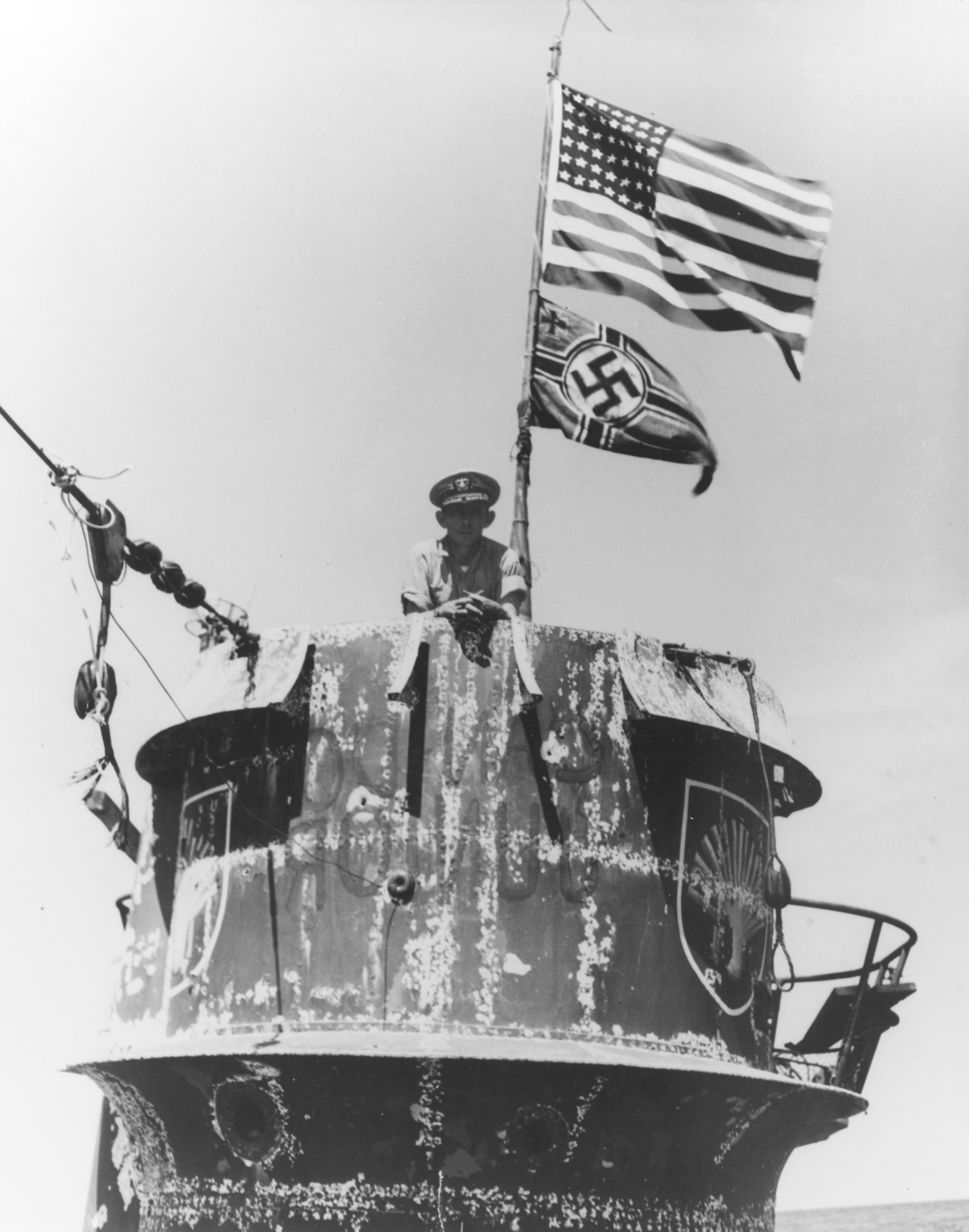
Captain Gallery on the U-505

Gallery ordered the boarding party from the destroyer escort USS Pillsbury to board the foundering submarine and if possible capture her. The destroyers in range used their .50 caliber and 20 mm antiaircraft guns to chase the Germans off the vessel so the boarding party could get onto her. Once on board, the party replaced the cover of the sea strainer, thus keeping the U-boat from sinking immediately. The boarders retrieved the submarine's Enigma coding machine and code books. (This was a primary goal of the mission because it would enable the codebreakers in Tenth Fleet to read German signals immediately, without having to break the codes). They got her under control, and U-505 became the first foreign man-of-war captured in battle on the high seas by the U.S. Navy since the War of 1812.

This incident was the last time that the order "Away All Boarders!" was given by a U.S. Navy captain. Lieutenant Albert David, who led the boarding party, received the Medal of Honor for his courage in boarding a foundering submarine that presumably had scuttling charges set to explode – the only Medal of Honor awarded in the Atlantic Fleet during World War II. For capturing U-505, Task Group 22.3 was awarded the Presidential Unit Citation and Gallery received the Distinguished Service Medal.

He also received a blistering dressing-down from Admiral Ernest J. King, Chief of Naval Operations. King pointed out that unless U-505's capture could be kept an absolute secret, the Germans would change their codes and change out the cipher wheels in the Enigma. Gallery managed to impress his crews with the vital importance of maintaining silence on the best sea story any of them would ever see. His success kept him from getting a court-martial instead of a medal. (Two noted naval historians, Samuel Eliot Morison and Clay Blair, Jr., take opposite views of Gallery's case. Morison saw it as an intrepid act of combat valor in the finest Navy tradition; Blair sided with Admiral King and called it an act of lunacy which could have undone all the work done by the codebreakers on both sides of the Atlantic.) After the war, King personally approved the award of the Presidential Unit Citation to Task Group 22.3 for the capture of the U-boat.

=== Later war ===
Gallery was given command of the aircraft carrier USS Hancock in September 1945. He relinquished command of Hancock on 10 December 1945.

== Post-World War II service ==
After promotion to rear admiral, Gallery became Assistant to the Chief of Naval Operations. He commanded Carrier Division Six during the Korean War.

=== Command of the Tenth Naval District ===
Gallery's final command was the Tenth Naval District in San Juan, Puerto Rico, from December 1956 to July 1960. During this command, with the help of the Rotary and Lions clubs, he established the first Little Leagues in Puerto Rico. It was also there that he first heard the steel bands of Trinidad. He was so taken by the sound that he invested $120 in steel drums for his command's Navy band. He established the first all-American and the only military steel band in 1957. The Tenth Naval District Steel Band – or Admiral Dan's Pandemoniacs, as they called themselves – became the U.S. Navy Steel Band and toured the world as ambassadors of the U.S. Navy until 1999.

Gallery was forced to retire from the Navy in 1960 when he was found medically unfit for service. Shortly before Gallery's retirement, the custom of "tombstone promotion" was abolished. So he was one of the few rear admirals of his era to be retired as only a rear admiral. Most of his contemporaries retired as vice admirals.

He died at the Bethesda Naval Medical Center on January 16, 1977, at the age of 75. He was buried with full military honors in Section 3 of Arlington National Cemetery, adjacent to two of his brothers.

== Awards and honors ==
- Navy Distinguished Service Medal
- Bronze Star
- Presidential Unit Citation
- Navy Commendation Medal
- Victory Medal
- American Defense Service Medal
- American Campaign Medal
- European-African-Middle Eastern Campaign Medal
- Asiatic-Pacific Campaign Medal
- World War Two Victory Medal
- National Defense Service Medal
- Philippine Liberation Medal

The guided-missile frigate USS Gallery was named for Daniel V. Gallery and two of his brothers, Rear Admiral William O. Gallery and Rear Admiral Phillip D. Gallery.

Gallery Park in Glenview, Illinois (where he commanded the Naval Air Reserve Training forces at the Naval Air Station Glenview from 1952 to 1954), is named after him. The park sits at the former site of the Naval Air Station.

== Books ==
=== Non-fiction ===
- Clear the Decks (Morrow, 1951)
- U-505 (original title: Twenty Million Tons Under the Sea) (1956)
- We Captured a U-boat (Popular Book Club, 1958)
- The Pueblo Incident (Doubleday, 1970)
- Eight Bells (original title: Eight Bells And All's Well) (Norton, 1965)

=== Fiction ===
- Now, Hear This! (Paperback Library, 1966)
- Stand By-y-y to Start Engines (Norton, 1966)
- Cap'n Fatso (sequel to Now, Hear This) (Norton, 1969)
- Away Boarders (sequel to Cap'n Fatso) (Norton, 1971)
- The Brink (Warner Books, 1973)

== See also ==
- William O. Gallery
- Phillip D. Gallery
- William Rynne
