= Philip D. Gallery =

United States Navy officer (1907–1973)

Philip Daly Gallery
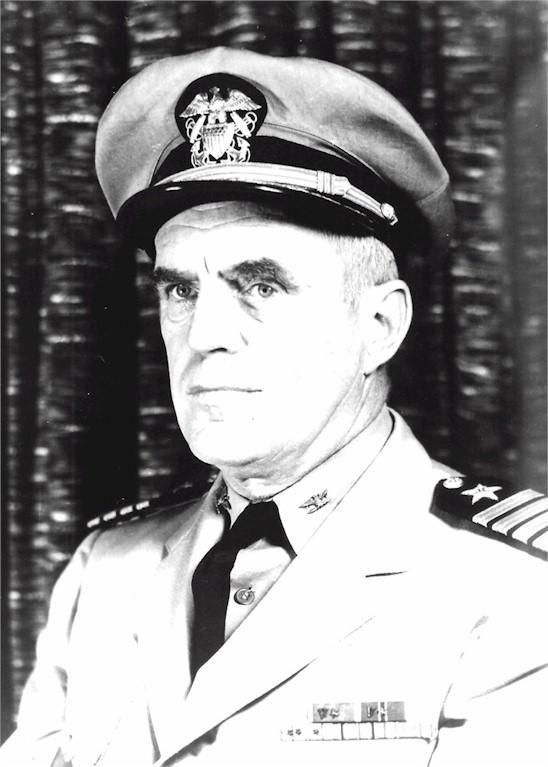
- Born: October 17, 1907
- Died: November 29, 1973 (aged 66)
- Burial place: Arlington National Cemetery
- Relatives: Mother: Mary Onahan Gallery. Brothers: RADM Daniel V. Gallery, RADM William O. Gallery
- Military career
- Allegiance: United States of America
- Branch: United States Navy
- Service years: 1928–1958
- Rank: Rear Admiral
- Commands: USS Jenkins (DD-447); Destroyer Division 72; USS Passumpsic (AO-107); USS Pittsburgh (CA-72)
- Conflicts: World War II; Cold War
- Awards: Legion of Merit (2); Bronze Star (2)

Rear Admiral Philip Daly Gallery (October 17, 1907 – November 29, 1973) was a United States Navy officer who served with distinction on destroyers in the Pacific Theater during World War II, rising to the rank of rear admiral.

Philip Gallery was the son of Daniel Vincent Gallery (born Chicago, July 19, 1865), lawyer, and Mary Onahan Gallery, writer. He graduated from the United States Naval Academy.

During World War II, he was in command of the destroyer USS Jenkins (DD-447), earning the Legion of Merit and two Bronze Stars for his service.

After World War II, his commands included Destroyer Division 72, the fleet replenishment oiler USS Passumpsic (AO-107), and the heavy cruiser USS Pittsburgh (CA-72).

He retired from the navy in 1958. He died in 1973 and was buried with full military honors in Arlington National Cemetery.

Two of his brothers, William O. Gallery and Daniel V. Gallery, also became rear admirals. The USS Gallery is named in honor of the three Admirals Gallery.

== Decorations ==

| 1st Row | Legion of Merit w/ Gold star and "V" Device | | Bronze Star Medal w/ Gold star and "V" Device |
| 2nd Row | American Defense Service Medal | American Campaign Medal | Asiatic-Pacific Campaign Medal w/ four bronze service stars |
| 3rd Row | World War II Victory Medal | National Defense Service Medal | Philippine Liberation Medal w/ two stars |

== See also ==
- William O. Gallery
- Daniel V. Gallery
