= William O. Gallery =

United States Navy admiral

William Onahan Gallery
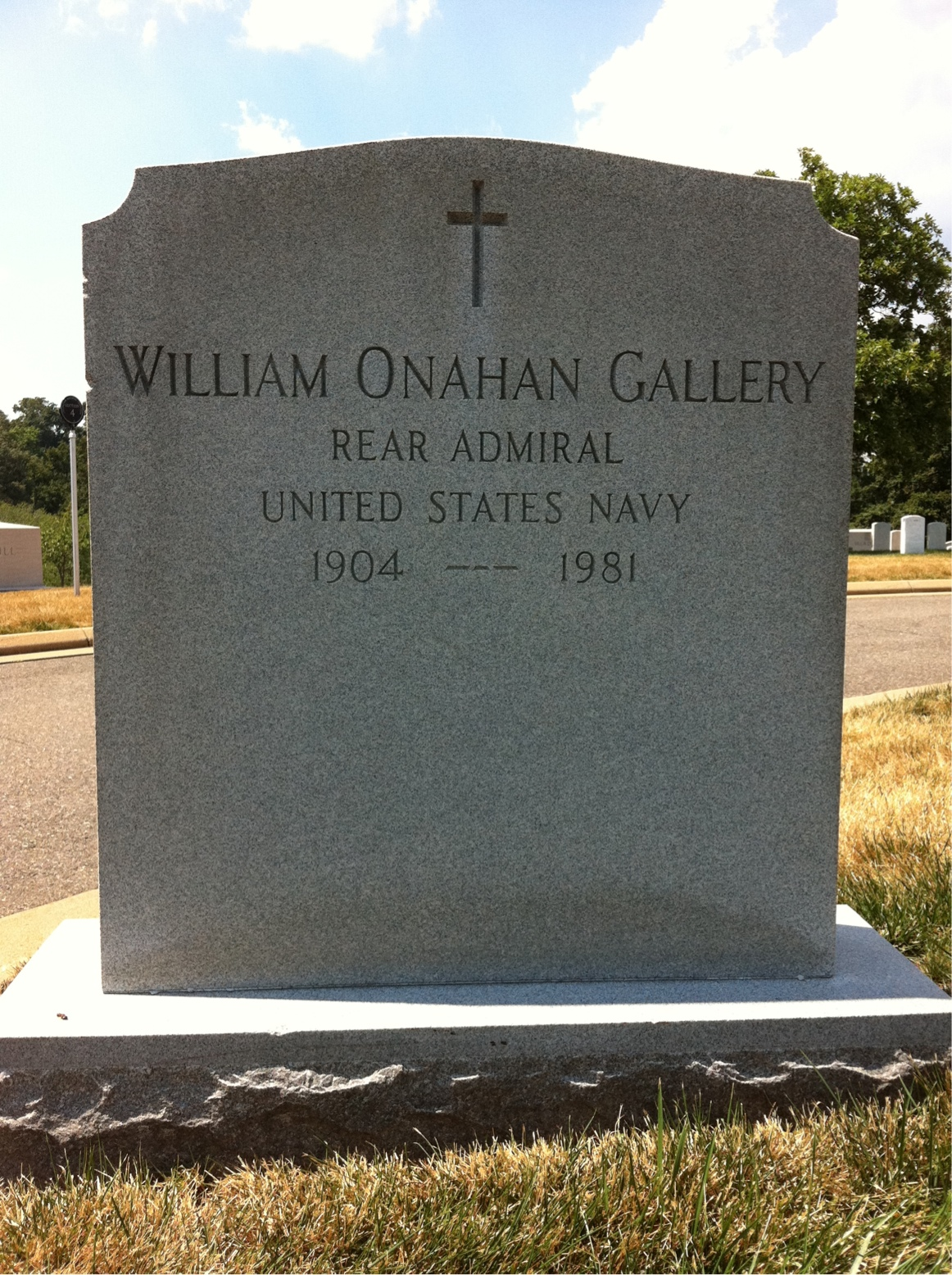
- Grave at Arlington National Cemetery
- Born: June 22, 1904; Chicago, Illinois
- Died: November 15, 1981 (aged 77)
- Burial place: Arlington National Cemetery
- Relatives: Mother: Mary Onahan Gallery. Brothers: RADM Daniel V. Gallery, USN; RADM Philip D. Gallery, USN; Fr. John I. Gallery, Catholic priest; an elder brother died in childhood Sisters: Margaret Gallery; Marsha Gallery
- Military career
- Allegiance: United States of America
- Branch: United States Navy
- Service years: 1925-1955
- Rank: Rear Admiral
- Commands: USS Chicago; USS Siboney; Naval Air Station Guantanamo; USS Princeton
- Conflicts: World War II
- Awards: Distinguished Flying Cross; Legion of Merit

Rear Admiral William Onahan Gallery (22 June 1904 – 15 November 1981) was a United States Navy admiral — one of three brothers who became United States Navy admirals. A graduate of the United States Naval Academy, he was a naval aviator who served with distinction in combat during World War II.

== Biography ==
William Onahan Gallery was born on 22 June 1904 in Chicago, Illinois. He was the son of Daniel Vincent Gallery (born Chicago, July 19, 1865), lawyer, and Mary Onahan Gallery, writer. Gallery entered the United States Naval Academy in 1921, the second of three brothers who would graduate from the Naval Academy.

He received his commission as a United States Navy ensign in 1925. He served aboard the battleship USS New Mexico from 1925 to 1927, followed by duty aboard USS Farragut from 1927 to 1930.

In 1930, Gallery reported for flight training in Pensacola, Florida. After nine months of training, he was awarded his wings as a naval aviator and assigned to Patrol Squadron 6 until 1933. He then transferred as an aviator to USS Omaha, where he served until 1935.

From 1935 to 1937, he served at the Aeronautical Engineering Laboratory in Washington, D.C. Then from 1937 to 1939, he served in Fighter Squadron 6 (VF-6) on the aircraft carrier USS Enterprise. His last assignment before World War II was at the Naval Air Station Alameda, Alameda, California.

In 1941, at the start of World War II, Gallery served on the staff of Admiral Thomas C. Kinkaid where he participated in the Battle of Santa Cruz; and then was based at Guadalcanal where he served in combat with the First Escort Carrier Task Group.

Gallery then joined the PBY night raider ("Black Cats") on USS Half Moon. He was awarded the Distinguished Flying Cross for his method of destroying Japanese night raiders.

On return to the States, he was promoted to the rank of captain and took command of USS Chicago. He followed this command with duty at Eglin Air Force Base; after which he was commanding officer of USS Siboney, then the Naval Air Station Guantanamo, Cuba. This was followed by an assignment as Deputy Chief of Naval Operations (Air), then command of USS Princeton in 1950. In Eight Bells and All's Well, his brother Daniel V. Gallery noted that Bill broke Princeton out of mothballs and had her launching airstrikes off Korea in less than 60 days, a speed record for reactivating an aircraft carrier.

Rear Admiral William Gallery retired from the United States Navy in June 1955. He died in 1981 and was buried at Arlington National Cemetery with full military honors.

USS Gallery is named in honor of the three Gallery admirals — William, Phillip, and Daniel.

== See also ==
William O. Gallery's brothers who were also Navy Rear Admirals:

- Phillip D. Gallery
- Daniel V. Gallery
