= 900 West Randolph =

Skyscraper in Chicago, Illinois

900 West Randolph Street
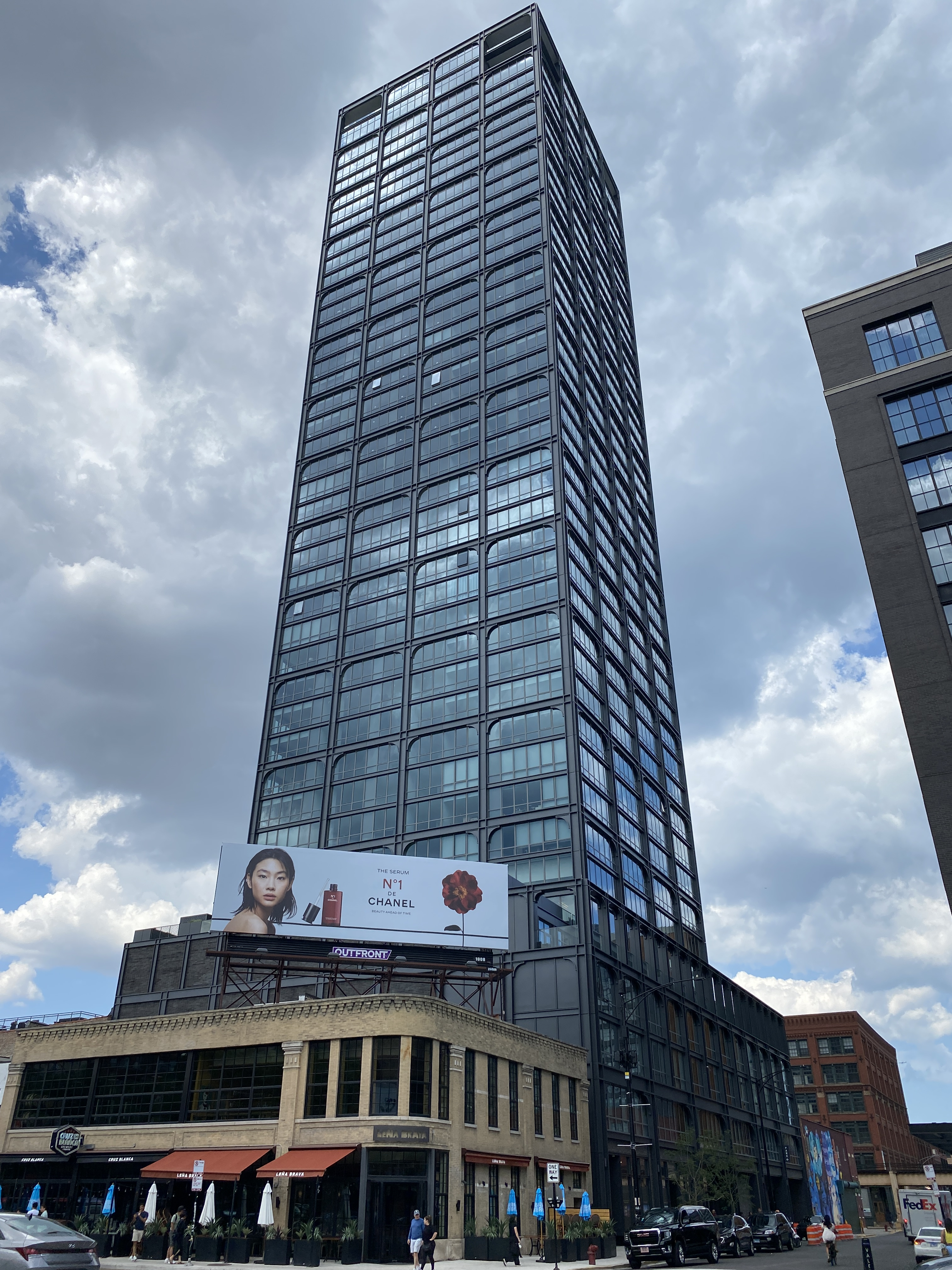
- 900 West Randolph from Randolph Street (July 2023)
- Interactive map of the 900 West Randolph Street area
- Alternative names: The Row; The Row Fulton Market; 170 North Peoria; 164 North Peoria; 160 North Peoria

General information
- Location: 164 North Peoria, Chicago, Illinois, United States
- Coordinates: 41°53′06″N 87°39′00″W
- Completed: 2023

Height
- Height: 495 ft (151 m)

Design and construction
- Architects: Morris Adjmi Architects; Stantec

900 West Randolph Street, also known as 164 North Peoria, The Row and The Row Fulton Market, is a skyscraper in the Near West Side community area of Chicago. It is located in the Fulton Market District section of the West Loop neighborhood, amid a block of landmarked buildings. It was completed in 2023 with 43 stories, slightly shorter than the original proposal of 51 stories after a series of redesigns. It became the city's tallest building west of Halsted Street. 20% of the units are marketed as affordable housing. It was designed by Morris Adjmi Architects, and it is Chicago's first high-rise built by a Black-owned construction firm.

== Architecture ==
The building is built in the Chicago school style with "exaggerated channels and beams" inspired by Mies van der Rohe, and a slender profile to preserve the sightlines of other buildings. Other architectural elements include a brick street front and riveted steel detailing. The exterior facade of glass and metal was inspired by Chicago infrastructure. The interior is in the mid-century modern style.

== History ==
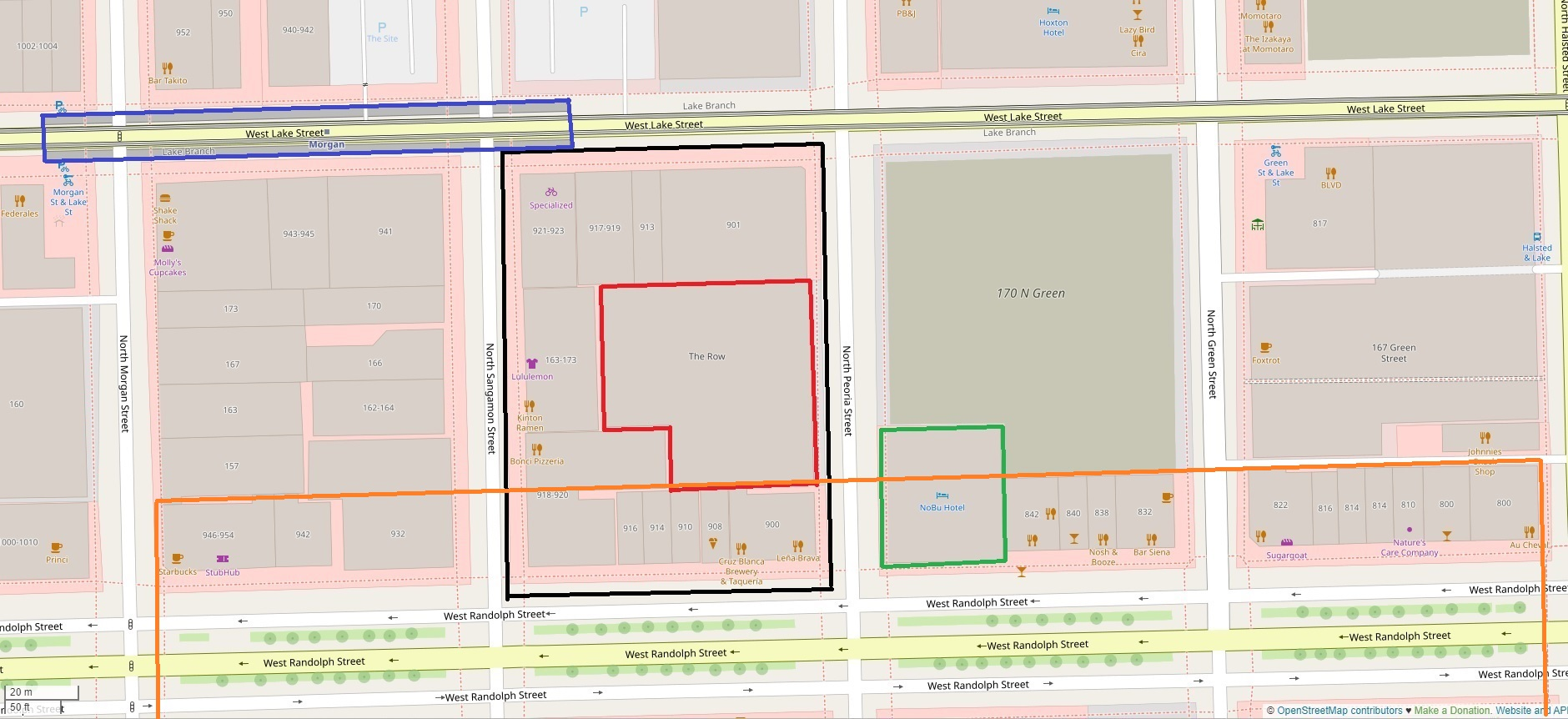
Neighborhood around the block (black) that includes 900 West Randolph (red) and numerous landmark buildings and the neighboring Nobu Hotel (green), north side of Restaurant Row (orange) and Morgan station (blue) in July 2023

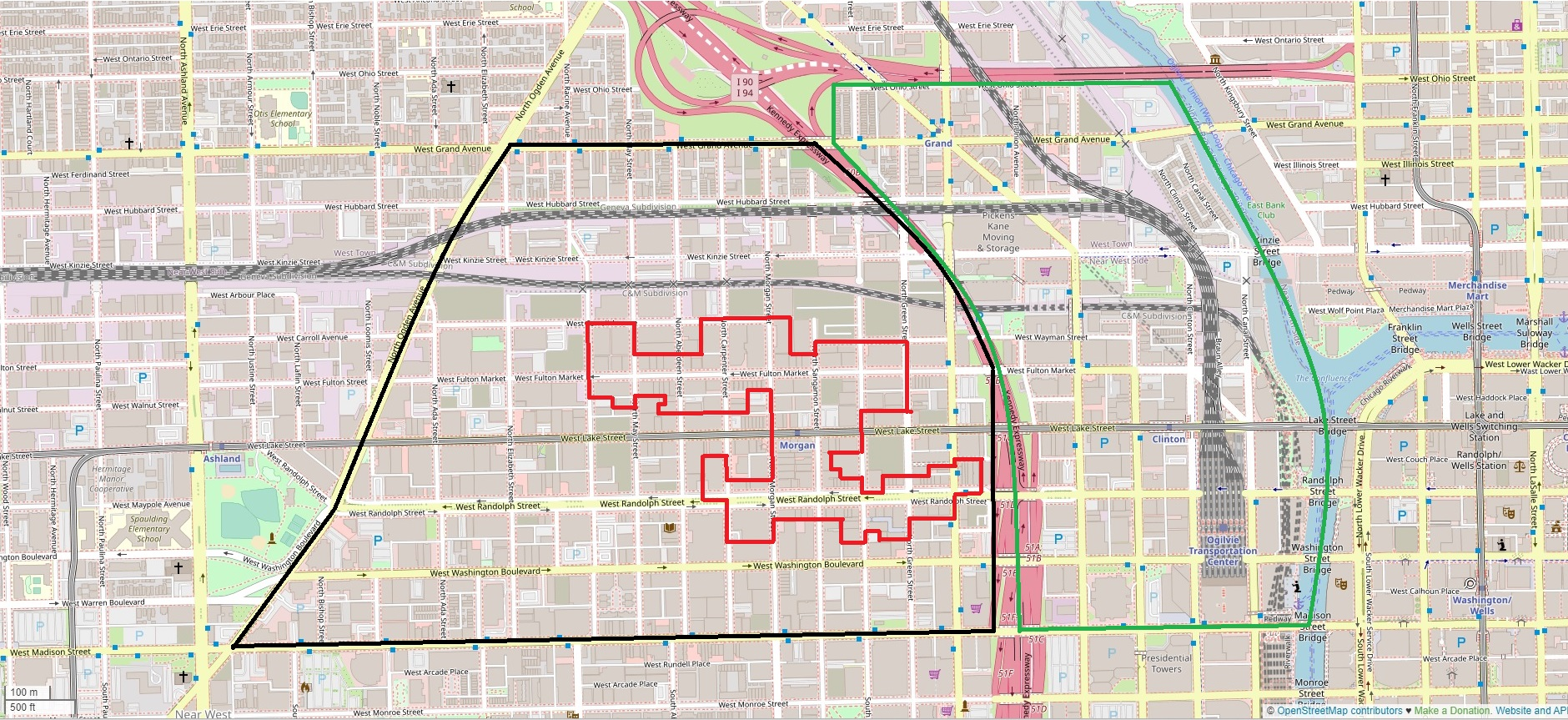
Map depicting the Fulton Market District (black) and its landmarked subsection (red) that surrounds 900 West Randolph as well as the neighboring Fulton River District (green)

In 2012, the Chicago Transit Authority opened the Morgan station. In 2014, West Loop stakeholders were resistant to a 12-story/154-foot (46.9 m) Nobu Hotel building on the northeast corner of Randolph and Peoria Streets. In 2015, Highland Park-based Tucker Development acquired the majority of the block surrounded by Randolph, Peoria, Sangamon, and Lake streets. Tucker planned a 18-story, 260-unit tower from OKW Architects in the center of the block as well as rehabbing numerous preserved low-rise landmarked buildings on the block as of April 2016. The rest of the block was officially designated as part of the Fulton-Randolph Market District Chicago Landmark district in July 2015.

900 West Randolph's zoning application was submitted by Related Midwest and Tucker Development on October 11, 2017. The original 2017 proposal was for a 51-story/570-foot (174 m) tall building with 300 residential units and 220 parking spaces. It was to have a mix of 46,000 square feet (4,274 m^{2}) of retail and 45,000 square feet (4,181 m^{2}) of office space. It was one of two buildings in the West Loop by Related Midwest that raised concern from local residents. Unlike the stakeholders of Related Midwest's even taller proposed 725 West Randolph, Neighbors of the West Loop Development Committee opposed the proposal noting in October 2017 that "The group considered this building – which would be the tallest (existing or proposed) West Loop structure west of Halsted by a factor of three – to be too tall, with too much density for the area. Additionally, the group was concerned that this building would set the new height standard for the West Loop." (Note: This is the tallest building west of Halsted Street. Any taller buildings in the city, such as Park Tower and Mall, that are further west are north of the northern terminus of Halsted Street (3800N) and its Clarendon extension to Lawrence (4800N).) The first renderings of the building were unveiled at the beginning of February 2018 with a 170 North Peoria address. Both 725 and 900 West Randolph required that the city authorize zoning changes. After meeting with resistance, 900 West Randolph was redesigned and presented at 43 stories in March 2018. The 495-foot (151 m) March 2018 redesign was later resubmitted at 36 stories to garner support for the project according to June 2018 correspondences with 27th Ward Alderman Walter Burnett. The building is situated in the section of Randolph Street known as Restaurant Row. The project includes historic restoration of the surrounding buildings that avails additional contiguous footage to 900 West Randolph while matching the low-rise streetwall and setting back the larger upward architectural projection.

In December 2019, the Chicago Plan Commission approved a 43-story version. This 43-storey version was designed by Morris Adjmi of New York with Stantec serving as the local architect of record. In November 2021, Related Midwest selected Bowa Construction to build the skyscraper, making it the first construction company owned by a person of color to construct a high rise building in Chicago. Thus, it has official billing as "the city's first high-rise with an African American Minority Business Enterprise co-leading construction". The building permit for the project was issued to LR Contracting Company for the project that was to be taller than anything west of Halsted. Because of proximity to public transit, including the Morgan station of the Chicago "L"'s Green and Pink Lines, planned on-site parking capacity was lowered to only 75 spaces. Upon completion, the project included 146 parking spaces and 12 electric charging stations. The official address of the completed project is 164 North Peoria Street. The project used new state incentives to provide 20% of the 300 units at affordable housing rental rates rather than market rates. On the other end of the spectrum, when the first move–ins occurred in June 2023, the project included six 42nd and 43rd floor penthouses ranging from 2,358–3,418 square feet (219.1–317.5 m^{2}) with 12-foot-high (3.7 m) ceilings and monthly rents up to over $23,000.

At the time the building opened in June 2023, two buildings of at least 600 feet (183 m) in height were already proposed in the Fulton Market District: 725 West Randolph at 665 feet (203 m), and 420 North May at 600 feet (183 m).

900 West Randolph in July 2023

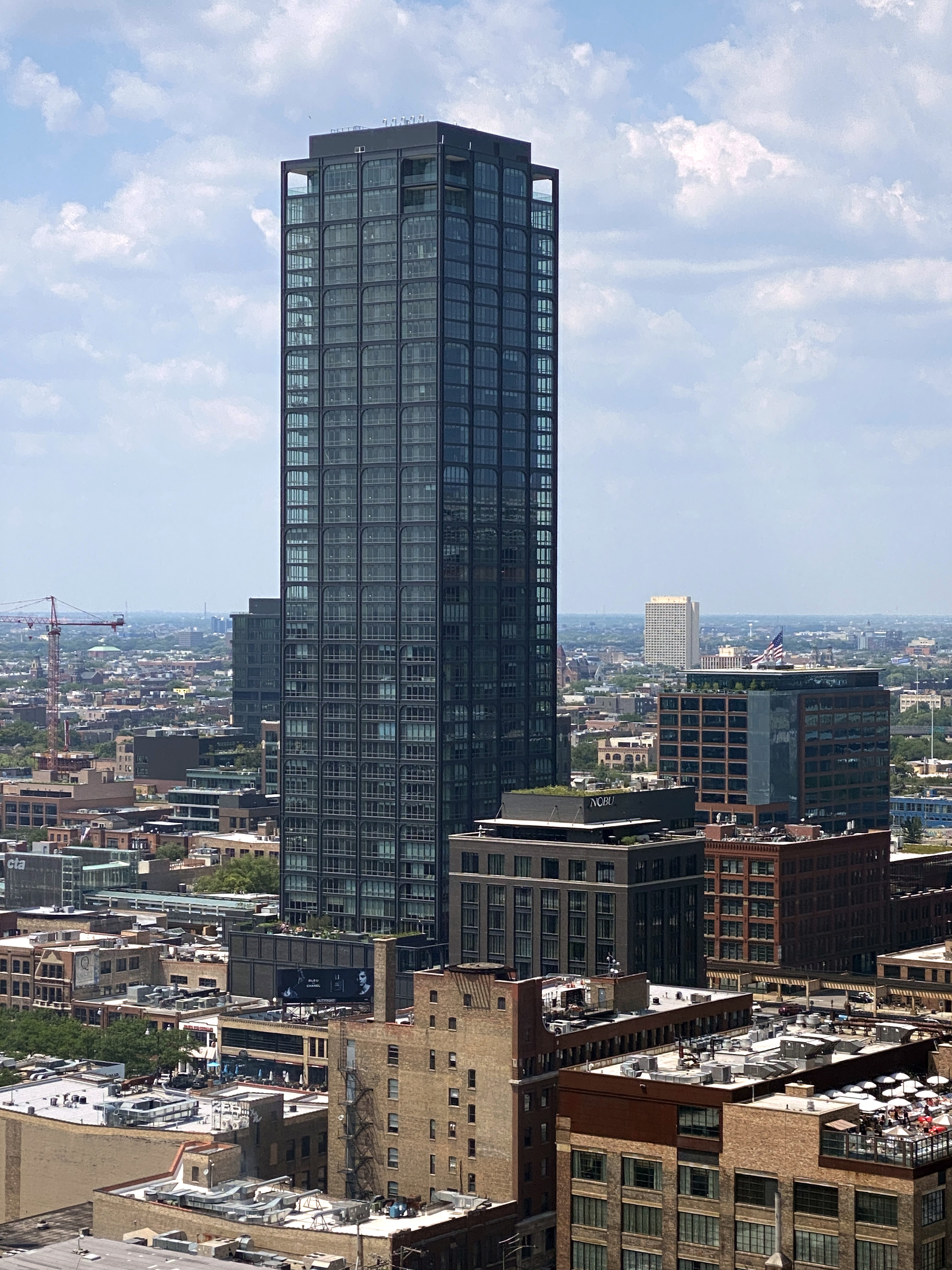
From 727 West Madison

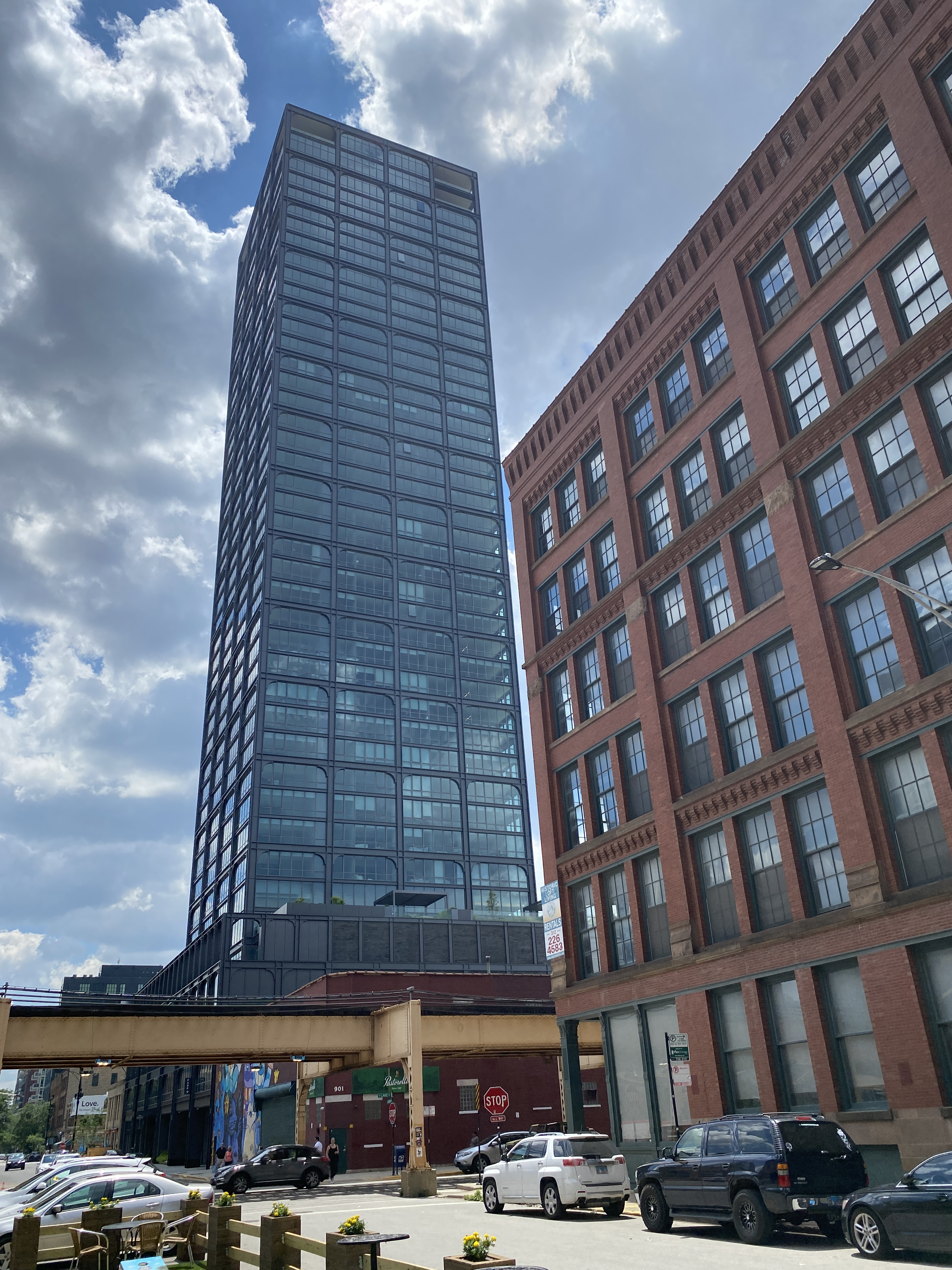
From Peoria Street behind Chicago "L" tracks

== See also ==
- List of tallest buildings in Chicago
