= Hukkster =

American shopping tool

- Website type: E-commerce
- Creators: Katie Finnegan and Erica Bell
- Website: hukkster.com
- Launched: May 2012

Hukkster was a shopping tool that tracked products online for users to notify them about sales and coupon codes. On August 1, 2014, an email to users announced the service was shutting down. On April 9, 2015, Hukkster relaunched with a new business model.

== History ==
Headquartered in New York City, Hukkster was founded in December 2011 by Katie Finnegan and Erica Bell. Finnegan and Bell met as merchandisers at J.Crew and later worked together in retail consulting at A.T. Kearney. The company launched in private beta by invitation only in May 2012 before launching publicly in September 2013.

In November 2012, Hukkster closed $1M in seed financing led by Winklevoss Capital, with participation from Chris Fiore, President of Henri Bendel, and Jerome Griffith, CEO of Tumi Inc.

In March 2013, Hukkster launched an app for the iPhone and iPad.

In April 2013, Hukkster announced its partnership with Self magazine, giving users the ability to "hukk" products directly from the magazine's website. In the same month, Time Inc. listed Hukkster as one of its 10 NYC Startups to Watch.

In May 2013, Hukkster announced a $2M seed round with Lisa Blau, wife of Related Companies president Jeff Blau, joining existing investors Tyler and Cameron Winklevoss.

In October 2013, Hukkster launched its second-generation app which included several product enhancements. On the new generation app, shoppers can input style numbers while browsing in stores to track the products.

In 2014, Fashion Group International named Hukkster a finalist in the annual Rising Star Awards.

On March 12, 2014, Hukkster closed a $1.5M round of venture capital. This round of financing included investment from Martin Trust, CEO of Samtex (USA), Inc; Kris and Tushara Canekeratne, co-founders of global IT firm Virtusa; Rowland Moriarty, chairman of the board of CRA International; and Archie Gottesman, executive vice president at Edison Properties.
