= Brideside =

American online retailer

- Company type: Private
- Founded: 2012
- Headquarters: Chicago, Illinois, {{{location_country}}}
- Key people: Sonali Lamba and Nicole Staple
- Industry: E-commerce
- Website: Brideside

Brideside is an online retailer that sells designer bridesmaid dresses and accessories for the entire bridal party founded by Kellogg School of Management classmates Sonali Lamba and Nicole Staple. Started as an online-only business, the company expanded to include physical retail operations before closing on November 16, 2020.

== History ==
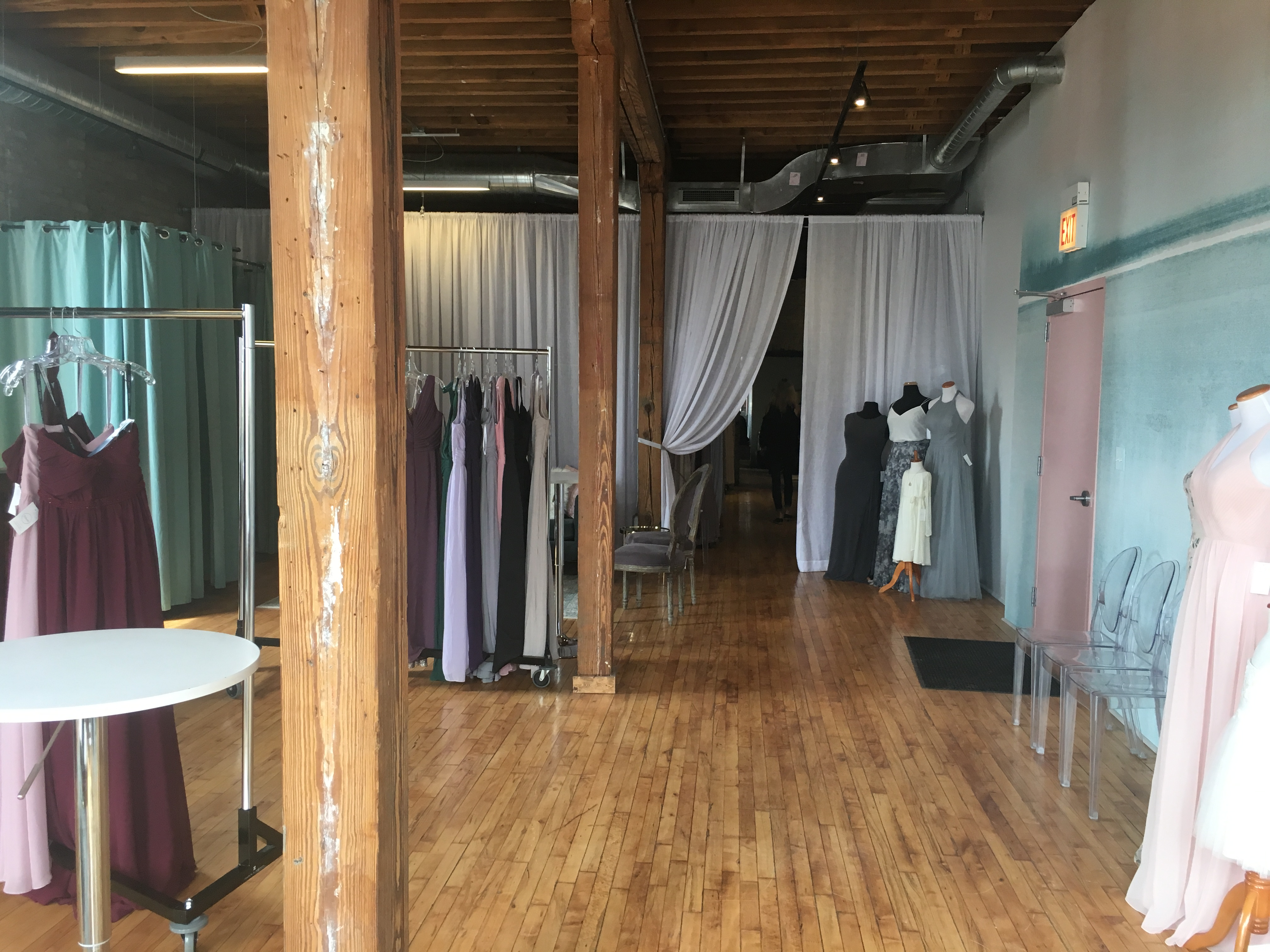
Brideside's original Near West Side showroom

Brideside was started by Lamba and Staple, who met at Northwestern University's Kellogg School of Management in 2010. They founded and incorporated the company in 2012, and it had its major launch in January 2014. The company allows brides to post dress selections online in digital galleries for feedback from bridesmaids and then mails selections to bridesmaids for trials. The business effectively delegates much of the bridesmaid fashion decisions to a Brideside stylist because once the bride has her consultation and posts choices, the stylist works with the bridesmaids.

After Lamba and Staple graduated from Kellogg, they moved to Philadelphia to work in a business incubator, but they returned to launch the business in Chicago, which they felt was the biggest bridal market in the country by spending. After operating for some time as an online only business, the operation added a brick-and-mortar presence in the summer of 2014 by moving to the Fulton River District of the Near West Side community area of Chicago. In 2015, the company got $1.5 million in seed funding. In 2016, the company expanded its website operation along several dimensions. In March 2017, the company made its first partnership with a major retailer, Lord & Taylor. In April 2017, the company opened its second flagship location in Charlotte, North Carolina.

The company had visions of more expansive product lines and grew to market and sell maternity wear.

On November 16, 2020, Brideside sent an email to announce that they had closed due to the impacts of COVID-19 on the wedding industry, writing that "But with two-thirds of weddings cancelled in 2020 and an uncertain year ahead, our chapter has come to an end."
