= 725 West Randolph =

Planned building in Chicago

725 W. Randolph Street
- Interactive map of the 725 W. Randolph Street area

General information
- Status: Proposed
- Location: Chicago, United States
- Coordinates: 41.88414°N 87.64679°W

Height
- Architectural: 615 ft (187 m)

Design and construction
- Architects: Roger Ferris + Partners; Perkins Eastman

725 W. Randolph Street is proposed skyscraper in Chicago designed by architectural firm Roger Ferris + Partners with architect of record Perkins Eastman. As proposed, the building will contain residences and an Equinox-brand hotel. It is one of two buildings under development in the West Loop by Related Midwest that has faced opposition from local residents. The Chicago Plan Commission approved the building in 2018, and Related plans to break ground in 2019. The building is planned to have 40 floors and be 925 thousand square feet.

== See also ==
- List of tallest buildings in Chicago
