= Fulton River District, Chicago =

Chicago neighborhood

Coordinates: 41.889°N 87.643°W

The Fulton River District in November 2006

The Fulton River District is a Chicago neighborhood located on the edge of the city's downtown, northwest of the Loop. The district is bounded by the Chicago River to the east, the Kennedy Expressway to the west, Ohio Street to the north and Madison Street to the south, making it part of the Near West Side and West Town community areas of Chicago in Cook County, Illinois, United States. Just across the expressway to the west is the Fulton Market District (Fulton Market). Money magazine ranked the neighborhood as #4 best place to live in the United States in 2019.

== History ==
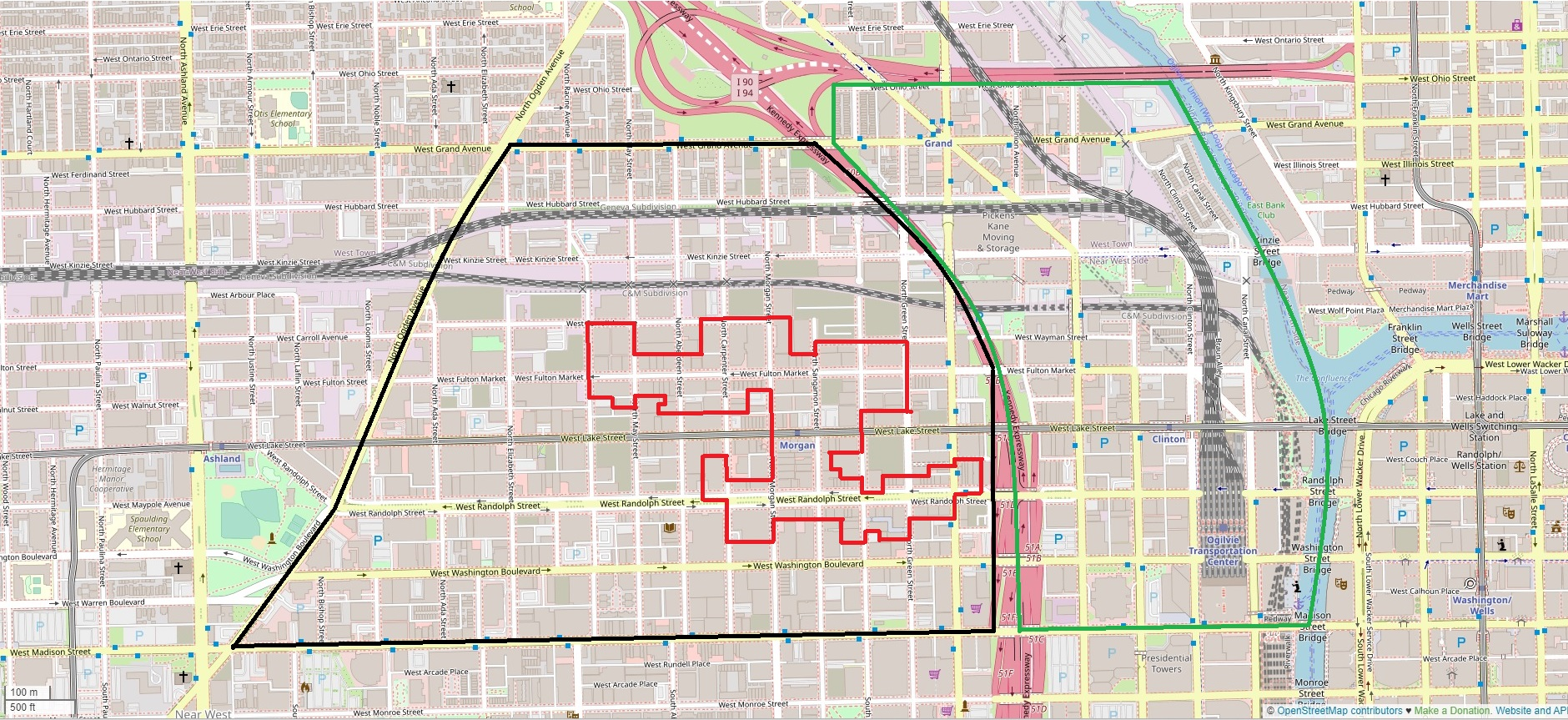
Map depicting the Fulton River District (green outline, right), neighboring Fulton Market District (black outline) and a landmarked subsection (red)

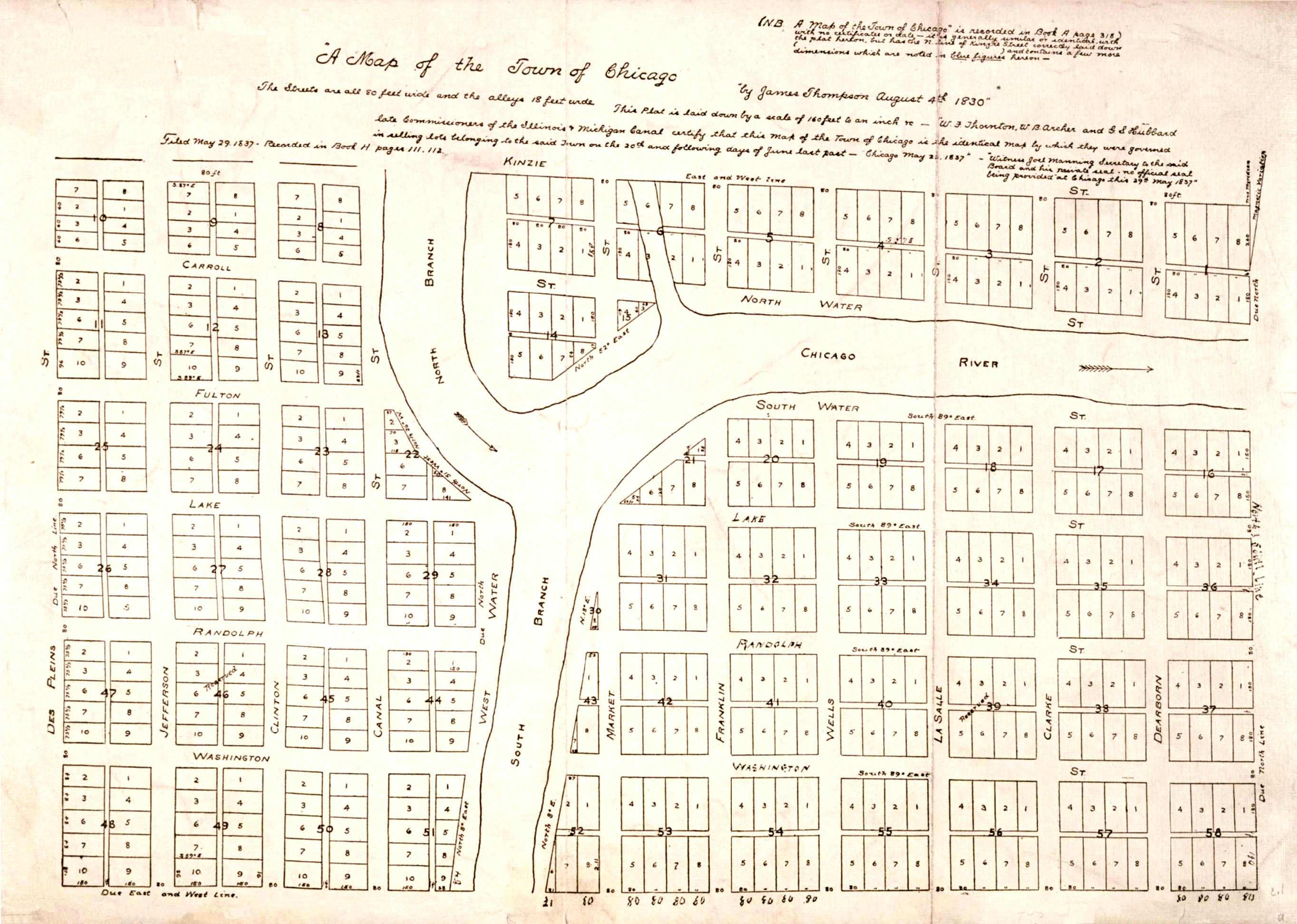
James Thompson's original 1830 plat of Chicago

James Thompson's original 1830 plat of Chicago was centered on Wolf Point at the fork of the Chicago River and included much of the area that is today the Fulton River District. The street grid and block layout imposed on this small area defined the pattern of Chicago's development as the city grew.

Commerce dominated the district for much of its history. Lumber and grain were shipped through the district, and Sears and Roebuck's first mail order warehouse was located at Fulton and Des Plaines. Randolph Street became the center of wholesale produce distribution in the late 19th century and was the site of the Haymarket Square labor riots of 1886 on Des Plaines Street.

== Transportation ==
Historically, the district has also moved people. The city's first railroad terminal was built at Kinzie and Canal in 1848. Another terminal was built a few blocks south along the river and became Union Station. Today, the Ogilvie Transportation Center is a major commuter rail hub, and nearby connections to the Kennedy Expressway make this one of the most accessible places in the region. The CTA provides transportation services such as the Green and Pink Line trains at Clinton, the Blue Line at Grand, and 3 major bus routes, which includes routes: #8 Halsted, #56 Milwaukee, and #65 Grand. It also has other various nearby transit services provided by the CTA.

== Development ==
Fulton River District and surrounding areas in June 2007

In the early 1990s, dance clubs and bars such as Shelter, Drink, China Club and Elxir set up for business in what was considered a gritty neighborhood at that time. In the mid-2000s, the Fulton River District served as a transition from the Loop to the east and River North to the northwest to the lower density, residential neighborhoods of the West Loop and West Town to the west. Originally dominated by industry, warehousing and transportation, the Fulton River District in the 2000s became increasingly residential. Low and mid-rise loft buildings were converted to condominiums and apartments as well as offices. New residential development brought townhomes, mid-rise and high-rise condos and apartments to the district. By the mid-2010s with the arrival of tech companies such as Google to the immediate west in the Fulton Market, the Fulton River District has become an established upscale neighborhood.

The Boeing Company and Ogilvie Transportation Center (formerly Northwestern Station), a major commuter rail terminal, are located in Fulton River District. The neighborhood is known for the scent of chocolate emanating from the Blommer Chocolate Company. The median household income in the neighborhood was $133,322 in 2019, while the median home price was $355,579.
