= Related Companies =

American real estate firm and developer

Related Companies, L.P.
- Type: Private
- Industry: Real estate development
- Founded: 1972; 54 years ago
- Founder: Stephen M. Ross
- Headquarters: 30 Hudson Yards, New York City, New York, United States
- Key people: Stephen M. Ross (Non Executive chairman); Jeff T. Blau (CEO); Bruce A. Beal, Jr. (president); Kenneth P. Wong (COO)
- Total assets: US$70 billion (2025)
- Total equity: US$4 billion (2017)
- Owner: Stephen M. Ross (60%)
- Number of employees: 4,000+ (2023)
- Subsidiaries: Related Midwest; Related California; Related Beal; Related Argent; Related Texas; Related Michigan; Related Affordable; Related Rentals; Related Construction; Related Digital
- Website: www.related.com

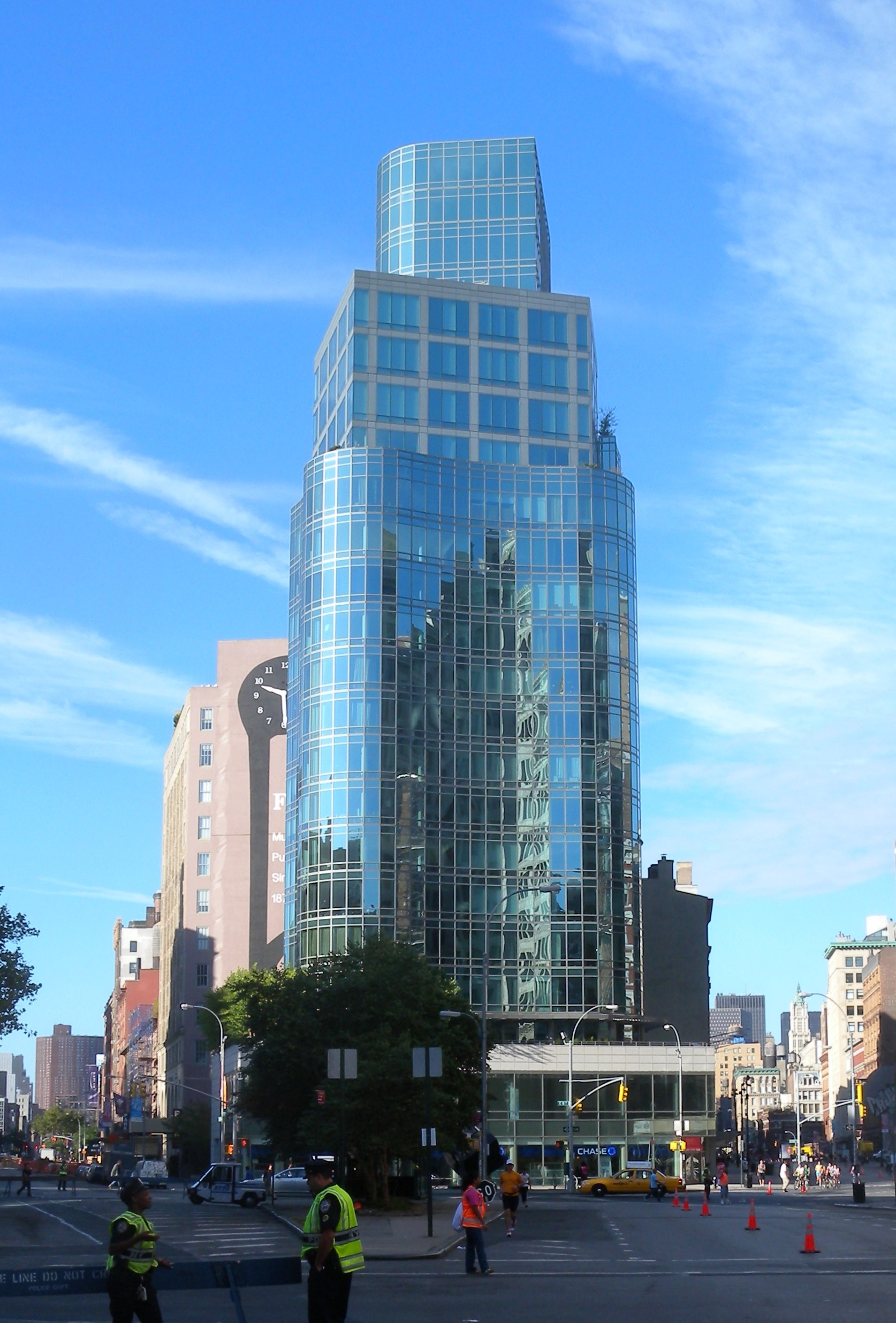
Astor Place

Related Companies, L.P., is an American real estate firm with headquarters in New York City, and with offices around the country including in Chicago, Boston, Los Angeles, San Francisco, as well as in London. Related developed the Hudson Yards Redevelopment Project, which comprises 28 acres (0.11 km^{2}) in Manhattan's Chelsea and Hell's Kitchen neighborhoods. Related is also the largest private owner of affordable housing in the United States.

The company's real estate assets, valued at over $70 billion, is made up of mixed-use, residential, retail, office, hospitality in what the company calls "premier high-barrier-to-entry markets."

Related has developed mixed-use projects such as Deutsche Bank Center, the Grand LA, and CityPlace.

== History ==
=== Company history ===
In 1972, Stephen M. Ross founded Related Companies with a $10,000 loan from his mother and a business plan focused on affordable housing. Related originally began as the Related Housing Companies, which built thousands of subsidized low and moderate income apartments nationwide.

By the 1980s, the company turned towards higher-profile projects. Related hired architect Robert A.M. Stern in the 1990s to design The Chatham on the corner of 65th Street and Third Avenue.

In September 2012, Ross became chairman, and Jeff Blau stepped into the role of CEO.

Boston-based developer Beal Companies merged with Related in 2013 to form Related Beal. In 2014, the United States Department of Justice filed a lawsuit against the company and several other large NYC developers, claiming failure to comply with the Americans with Disabilities Act of 1990.

UK based Related Argent was created by Argent Partners and Related Companies and announced its plans to develop a 180-acre North London neighborhood, Brent Cross Town, in 2020. It is currently under development.

In 2021, Related was one of the founders of energyRe, a clean energy company.

The company announced in July 2024 that Ross would be stepping down as chairman of Related Companies to focus on his other business ventures. Ross will continue to serve as nonexecutive chairman of Related Companies, while Jeff Blau, Bruce Beal Jr., and Kenneth Wong will run the company.

In 2025, Related Companies launched Related Digital, a vertically integrated data center development and investment platform. Related Digital combines Related Companies' real estate and infrastructure to develop energy solutions through its affiliate focused on transmission line development and renewable energy, energyRe. In October 2025, Related Digital broke ground on a 302 MW data center campus in Cheyenne, Wyoming. The $1.2 billion data center marks the first phase of a 115-acre campus in the Cheyenne Business Parkway. Also in October of that year, Related Midwest and PsiQuantum officially broke ground on the 128-acre Quantum Shore Chicago project, which will host the country's first utility-scale quantum computer.

=== Notable projects ===
In 1998, Related announced one of its most notable projects: the $1.7 billion mixed-use Time Warner Center in New York City. In December 2003, as part of one phase of the Time Warner Center development, Related opened the Mandarin Oriental hotel. The Shops at Columbus Circle, which includes retail as well as residences, was completed in 2004. Within four years of its opening, retail rents in the area were up 400 percent. In May 2021, Time Warner sold One Columbus Circle back to Related, and the building was renamed the Deutsche Bank Center.

Their next large New York City large scale development was Hudson Yards, the first phase of which opened in 2019. Also in Hudson Yards, in late 2022, Related entered into a partnership with Wynn Resorts to develop an integrated resort with a casino on the western yard. The proposal underwent many adjustments before Wynn Resorts ultimately withdrew their casino bid in May of 2025, ending the partnership with Related.

In October 2022, the company unveiled The Cortland, a 25-story luxury residential building designed by Robert A.M. Stern and Olson Kundig.

The groundbreaking ceremony for the Hudson Tunnel Project, a new river tunnel that would double the amount of trains coming from and to New Jersey, took place in November 2023. Related is leading the construction of the concrete casing of the Tunnel. The following month, Related broke ground on Willets Point, the largest New York City affordable housing project in 40 years. In December 2025, Willets Point Commons started accepting applications through NYC Housing Connect for the 880 affordable homes located across Buildings 1 and 2.

Related also has presences in other cities. In 2023, Related signed its first major lease with WHOOP at One Kenmore Square as part of the redevelopment of properties under the iconic Citgo sign. The company launched Lantern House in September of 2021.

The Grand LA opened in July 2022. Designed by Frank Gehry, the $1.3 billion development includes a 45-story multifamily structure, a 28-story hotel and 164,000 square feet of retail and restaurant space. Related's Quinn property broke the record for most expensive home sold in Boston's South End in November 2022; the unit sold for $7.4 million.

In 2022, the Boston Planning and Development Agency approved Related Beal's 1.1 million-square-foot Channelside project, a $1.2 billion three-building lab and residential complex along with a public performing arts amphitheater.

In 2023, Related Midwest opened the Row Fulton Market, a 294-unit luxury rental condo that is the tallest building in Chicago's Fulton Market District. That same year, Related and The Olayan Group began the first BTR rental home offering at Author King's Cross.

In October 2023, the University of Michigan approved construction for the $250 million UM Center for Innovation, which will be developed by Related in partnership with ODM.

In March 2026, Related Midwest broke ground on The 78, an urban renewal infill in South Loop, Chicago.
