= Jeff Blau =

American businessman

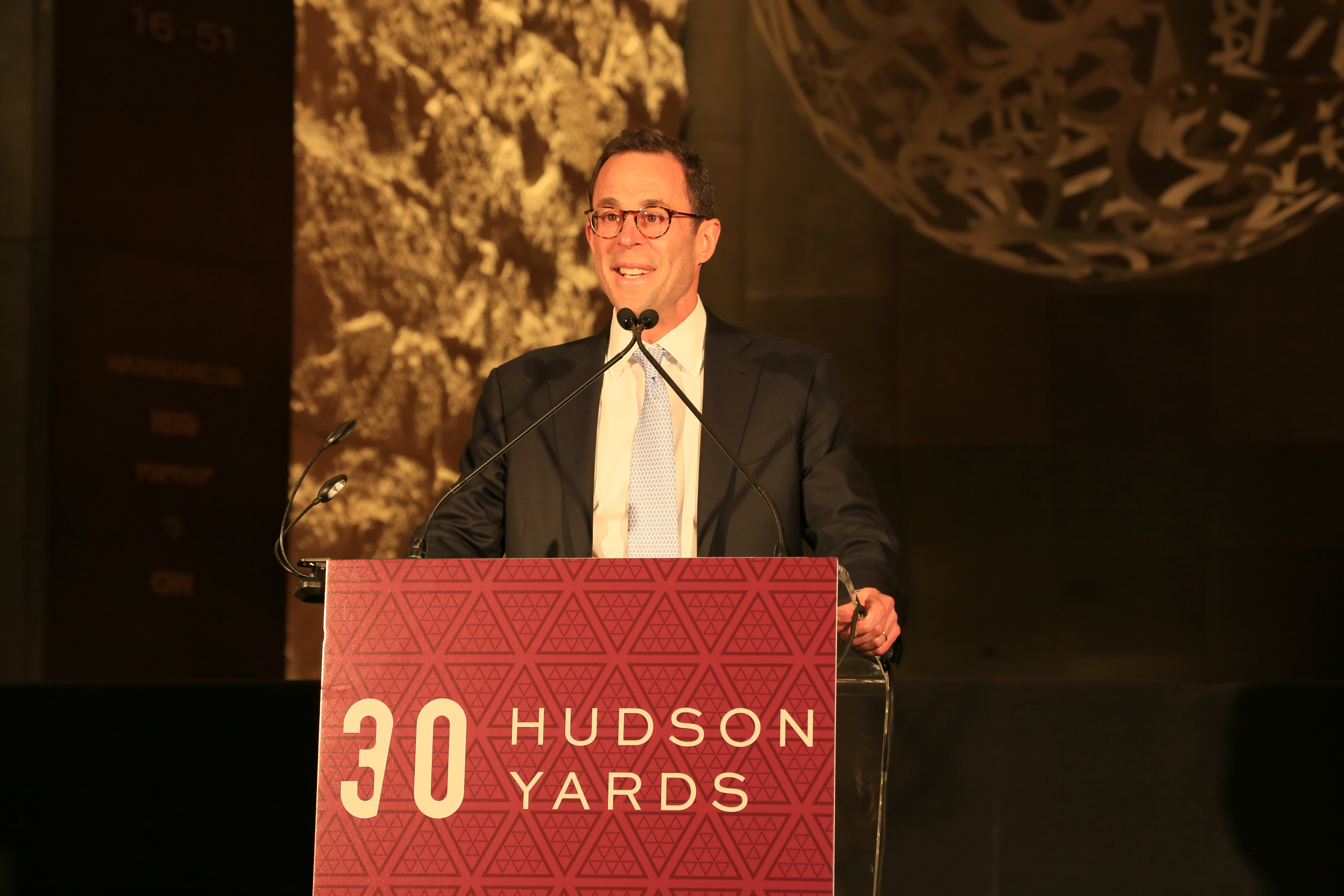
- Born: 1968 (age 57–58); Woodbury, Long Island, New York, US
- Education: University of Michigan; M.B.A. University of Pennsylvania’s Wharton School
- Occupation: CEO of Related Companies
- Children: 3

Jeff Blau (born 1968) is an American businessman and chief executive officer of Related Companies.

== Early life and education ==
Blau was born and raised in Bayside, Queens, spending the first nine years of his life there before later moving to Woodbury, Long Island.

Starting at an early age, he spent summers working on job sites with his father, a builder and contractor, which sparked his love of real estate and development.

Blau attended and graduated from the University of Michigan. While in school, Blau teamed up with a local contractor to buy single-family homes in Ann Arbor and subdivide them into student apartments.

Blau signed up for a graduate-level real estate development class during his junior year. His professor introduced Blau to Stephen M. Ross when Ross delivered an address at a conference.

After Blau graduated from Michigan in 1990, Ross offered him a job at Related Companies. By that time, the market had crashed, leading Blau to attend the MBA at the Wharton School of the University of Pennsylvania from 1990 to 1992, where he earned a Master in Business Administration in 1992. Blau commuted from New York to Philadelphia, taking classes while continuing to work at Related Companies.

== Career ==
In 1994, Blau was project manager of the joint-purchase, along with Apollo Real Estate, of the Tribeca Tower, converting it to an 80/20 building.

Blau was appointed as President of Related Companies in 2000. By then, he had been involved in 25 deals exceeding $2 billion, with another almost $3 billion worth of property under construction.

In 2001, he was included in Crain 40 Under 40 Class of 2001.

Blau closed a deal to develop the Coliseum site at Columbus Circle by convincing Time Warner CEO Richard Parsons to sign on as an anchor tenant.

Since 2012, with more than $15 billion in residential, mixed use and retail assets under management, Ross named Blau has been CEO of Related Companies, as well as a partner at the company.

Since being named CEO, Blau has overseen projects worth over $60 billion. He is most known for spearheading the development and opening of Hudson Yards. Originally a different developer had won the bid to develop the Yards, but backed out in 2008; Related immediately got back involved, with Blau saying he “essentially moved into the office and didn’t leave until the deal got done.” Currently, Blau is working on the company’s efforts to develop the Western Rail Yards, with Related proposing to build a 3 million-square-foot resort tower and 1,700 room hotel.

Blau also is chairman and founding partner of energyRe, a company developing clean energy projects.

== Civic and philanthropic activities ==
Blau and his wife Lisa established the Blau Family Foundation in 2014, which provides grants to organizations that focus on education, health, arts and culture.

Blau founded the holding company Bikeshare Holdings LLC, which operates the Citi Bike sharing system in New York, in 2014.

The University of Michigan named a five story building after Blau in 2016. Jeff T. Blau Hall is part of a $135 million construction project on the Ann Arbor campus.

In 2020, he and Lisa launched the Jeff and Lisa Blau Adolescent Consultation Center for Resilience and Treatment at Mount Sinai, where he is a trustee. Known as The Blau Center, it will be a clinical and research platform to increase understanding of psychiatric illness, particularly schizophrenia.

In 2020, he was named as part of Crain's New Influential List of 25 Leaders Reshaping New York.

Blau is on the Board of Directors of the Central Park Conservancy, the Partnership for New York City, and The Real Estate Roundtable. He is on the Board of Trustees of the Mount Sinai Medical Center and the Urban Land Institute.

In 2023, Blau signed a statement from the Anti-Defamation League titled "Urge the University of Pennsylvania to Investigate Anti-Israel & Anti-Zionist Student Groups". The letter accuses Students for Justice in Palestine of "glorifying Hamas' atrocities" and declares Zionism to be "a fundamental component of Jewish identity".

== Personal life ==
Blau has three children. His primary residence is in New York City.
