= James Thompson (surveyor) =

American surveyor (1789–1872)

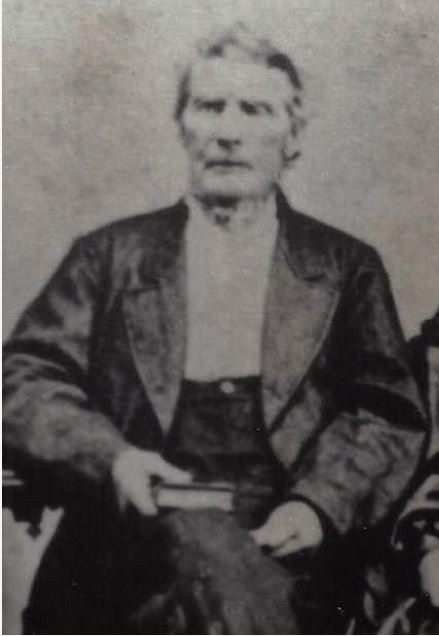
- Thompson in the 1860s

Probate Judge of Randolph County, Illinois
- In office 1831–1848
- Preceded by: Hunt
- Succeeded by: John Campbell (as County Judge)

Member of the Randolph County, Illinois Board of Commissioners
- In office 1820–1821 Serving with David Anderson and Niles Hotchkiss

Personal details
- Born: 1789 Abbeville, South Carolina, U.S.
- Died: October 6, 1872 (aged 82–83) Randolph County, Illinois, U.S.
- Profession: Surveyor

James Thompson (1789 – October 6, 1872) was an American surveyor who created the first plat of Chicago. Born in South Carolina, Thompson moved to Kaskaskia in southern Illinois as a young man and lived in the area for the rest of his life, working primarily as a surveyor. He was hired to plat settlements at the ends of the proposed Illinois and Michigan Canal in northern Illinois; he completed the plat of Chicago, the settlement at the eastern end, on August 4, 1830. After completing his survey of Chicago he returned to the Kaskaskia area and declined an offer of land in Chicago in favor of a cash payment of US$300. In addition to his surveying work, he served in various positions such as probate judge, county commissioner, and officer in the Illinois militia during the Black Hawk War.

Chicago appears on maps from the 17th century and had been inhabited by non-indigenous people since the late 18th century. Thompson's plat fixed the location associated with the word "Chicago", which had previously been used for various places around the southwestern shore of Lake Michigan, and allowed the residents of the area to obtain legal title to their property. Extensions of Thompson's plat were made in the following years as Chicago experienced rapid expansion. Chicago incorporated as a town in 1833 and as a city in 1837 as growth continued, and by 1890 had more than a million inhabitants and was the second-most-populous city in the United States. Thompson has been commemorated several times in Chicago's history; his grave, which was originally unmarked, was given a monument by the city of Chicago in 1917.

== Early life ==
James Thompson was born in 1789 in Abbeville, South Carolina, to Mary Glasgow and John Porter Thompson. His parents were Scots-Irish immigrants who had moved to the area prior to the American Revolution. Members of the Scots-Irish community in Abbeville created a settlement near Kaskaskia in Randolph County, Illinois, in 1802. Two of Thompson's uncles moved to the settlement in 1804, followed by Thompson and a brother in 1814. Thompson served as a teacher in Kaskaskia for three years before marrying his cousin Margaret in October 1817 and thereafter living in nearby Preston. The couple would ultimately raise 12 children.

== Career ==
=== Early career ===
Thompson surveyed the Kaskaskia and Covington Road in 1819, linking Randolph County to St. Clair and Washington counties. Serving as a county commissioner during 1820 and 1821 alongside David Anderson and Niles Hotchkiss, he implemented the 1820 United States census and a contemporaneous state census in Randolph County. In 1821 he was appointed as a United States surveyor and held that position for over 20 years. He undertook other surveying projects in and around Randolph County, including a road linking Kaskaskia to the then-state capital of Vandalia in 1824 and the boundary of Randolph and Monroe counties in February 1830.

=== Plat of Chicago ===
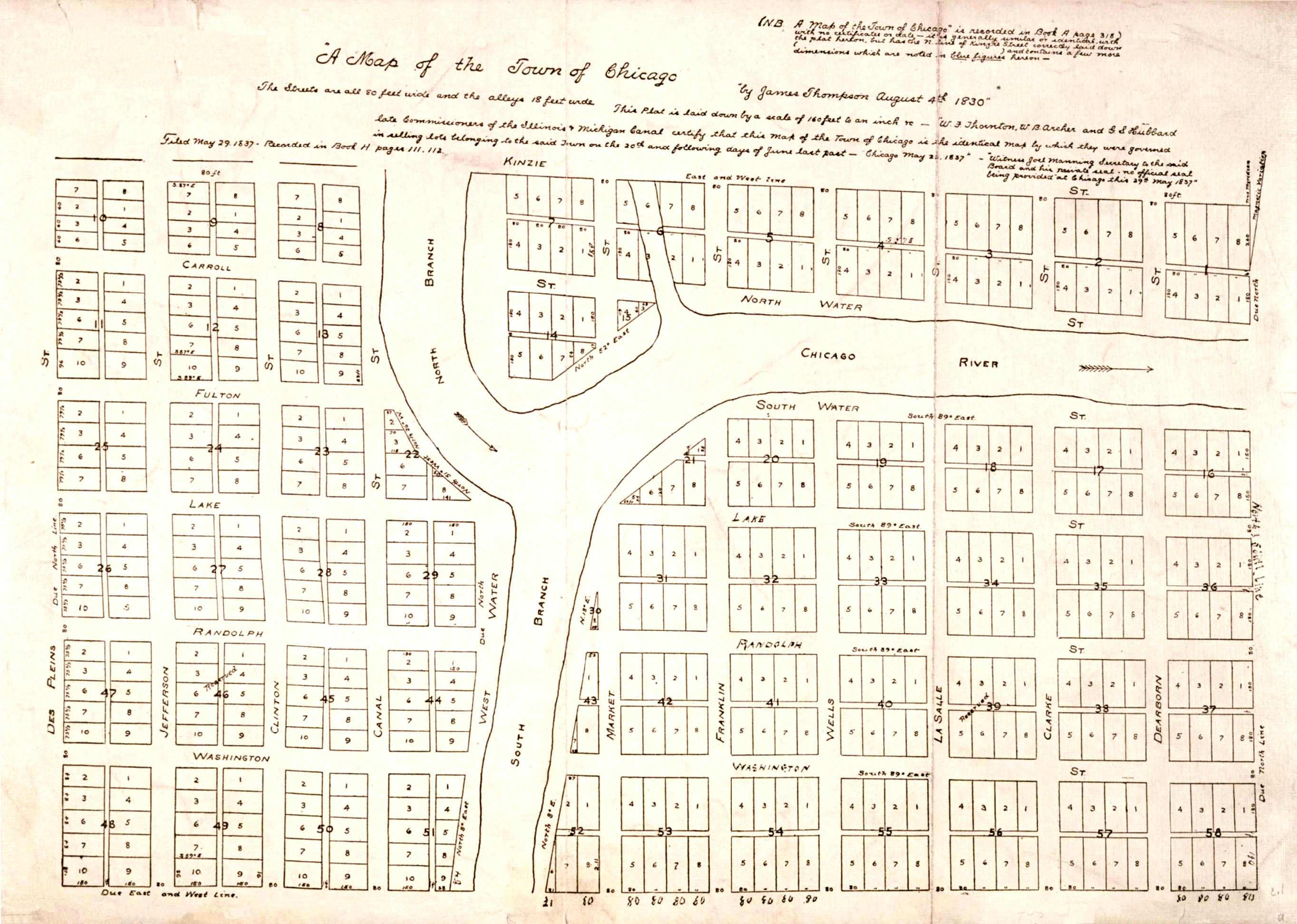
Thompson's plat of Chicago

Shortly after attaining statehood in 1818, Illinois planned to connect the Illinois River to the Eastern United States by a canal connecting it with the Great Lakes and thereby the Erie Canal. Congress granted the state a right of way for the proposed Illinois and Michigan Canal in 1822, and augmented that grant in 1827 with parcels of land adjoining the proposed canal to sell and raise funds for its construction. The canal was planned to span from Ottawa at the Illinois River in the west to Chicago at Lake Michigan in the east. In 1830, state-appointed commissioners of the proposed canal hired Thompson to survey the two ends; Thompson finished surveying Ottawa on July 5 and Chicago on August 4.

Thompson's survey of Chicago was bounded by Kinzie Street, Madison Street, State Street, and Desplaines Street, (Note: The Chicago Tribune wrote in 1955 that the northern and western boundaries of Thompson's survey were actually Hubbard Street and Union Street, respectively. Kinzie Street and "Des Pleins Street" are the respective northernmost and westernmost named streets in the copy of the plat held by the Chicago History Museum.) an area of about 0.375 square miles (0.97 km^{2}). It did not extend to Lake Michigan because Fort Dearborn, which had been built by the United States government in 1803, occupied land on the lakeshore. The plat area was divided into 58 blocks, which were assigned numbers from northeast to southeast in a boustrophedon order, and contained streets 66 feet (20 m) wide and alleys 16 feet (4.9 m) wide. The pioneer Mark Beaubien's cabin ended up in the middle of one of the streets; he bought two lots of the plat and moved his property by a couple of yards.

Thompson named the streets in the area. Several, such as Randolph Street, were named after Randolph County and its surrounding counties. Lake Street was named as it was felt to be the likeliest street to first reach Lake Michigan due to its position near the Chicago River just south of the fort. Dearborn Street was similarly named for being the closest named north–south street to the fort. Kinzie, LaSalle, and Wells Streets were named for historical figures associated with the area. (Note: The family of the pioneer John Kinzie, the explorer René-Robert Cavelier, Sieur de La Salle, and the soldier William Wells, respectively.) State and Madison Streets were unnamed on the plat, State Street serving merely as the boundary between the plat area and the fort.

=== Later years ===
After completing his survey of Chicago, Thompson returned to Randolph County and declined an offer of land in Chicago in favor of a cash payment of US$300. (Note: equivalent to $9,070 in 2025) Revisiting his earlier projects, he resurveyed the Kaskaskia and Covington Road in 1831 and the road between Kasaskia and Vanadalia in 1833. He was the probate judge of Randolph County from 1831 to 1848; his tenure ended when a new Illinois Constitution made the County Judge of a county automatically in charge of probate, and the County Judge John Campbell thereby assumed probate. In this capacity Thompson dealt with the estates of early Illinois politicians such as Shadrach Bond and Pierre Menard. In the Black Hawk War of 1832 he served as a lieutenant and later captain in the Illinois Mounted Volunteers. He did surveying work for various other towns and counties in Illinois, in later years assisted by some of his sons. By 1859 he had become Deputy Surveyor of Randolph County, at which point his reputation was such that "whenever the name of James Thompson is mentioned, the idea of surveying is suggested." Many of Thompson's family members would also become surveyors, including a brother, several sons, and a son-in-law. Thompson died in Randolph County on October 6, 1872, and was buried in Preston's cemetery.

== Legacy ==
Chicago at the time of James Thompson's plat; the black dot marks the location of the du Sable house. Thompson's plat area Fort Dearborn Modern shoreline

Chicago appears under various spellings in maps dating from the 17th century and is present in most 18th-century maps of North America. Jean Baptiste Point du Sable was the first non-indigenous permanent resident of the area, settling at the mouth of the Chicago River no later than 1790. The United States government built Fort Dearborn in the area in 1803, and more pioneers settled in the early 19th century, numbering approximately 75 by 1830.

Prior to Thompson's survey the word "Chicago", derived from an indigenous word for the wild leeks in the area, was used to refer to several locations in the area, such as the modern Chicago River and the modern Des Plaines River. Thompson's survey defined the geography entailed by the word and allowed it to be bought and sold in parcels. Thompson's plat created a grid system for Chicago's street layout, and gave its residents legal title to their land. Chicago started expanding rapidly in the 1830s, receiving ts first town charter in 1833 and its first city charter in 1837, and the plat was extended starting in 1834. The plat and its grid represented the commodification of land in the city that would define its 19th-century development; the grid combined with the advent of balloon-frame construction fueled Chicago's rapid growth. Chicago's expansion was bolstered in the mid-19th century as it became a transportation hub for the United States, and by 1890 it had over a million residents and was the second-most-populous city in the United States.

The intersection of State and Madison Streets was selected as the origin of Chicago's address system in 1909 because they were the baseline of Thompson's plat. The Real Estate Board of Chicago commemorated the 100th anniversary of Thompson's plat by giving away land around Chicago to winners of an essay contest; a great-great-niece of Thompson's received third prize and land in Wheaton. The Chicago Tribune celebrated the plat's 125th anniversary as "Chicago's birthday", and asserted that Chicago was the sole major city in the world to have such a definitive date. The original copy of the plat is held by the Chicago History Museum, to whom it was donated by P. W. Kunning of the Chicago Association of Commerce and Industry in 1954. The Block 37 development in the Chicago Loop is named after one of the numbered blocks in Thompson's plat.

Thompson's grave was originally unmarked. In 1917 a Chicago alderman is said to have wondered why State and Madison were chosen as the baselines of Chicago's grid given that their intersection is located far east of the city's geographic center. An investigation into the matter discovered that Thompson had used those streets as the baseline of his survey, and revealed Thompson's historical significance to Chicago. The Chicago City Council allocated funds to a monument to Thompson on his grave, which was dedicated by mayor William Hale Thompson on May 30.

== Works cited ==
- Andreas, Alfred Theodore (1975) [1884–1886]. History of Chicago. Vol. 1. New York: Arno Press. OCLC 42465156.
- Miller, Donald L. (1996). City of the Century: The Epic of Chicago and the Making of America. New York: Simon & Schuster. ISBN 0-684-80194-9.
- Montague, E. J. (1948) [1859]. Leighty, Elisabeth Pinkerton (ed.). The History of Randolph County, Illinois, including old Kaskaskia Island. Sparta, Illinois: Sparta, Ill.
- Quaife, M. M. (June 1928). Quaife, M. M. (ed.). "Property of Jean Baptiste Point Sable". The Mississippi Valley Historical Review. 15 (1). Oxford, England: Oxford University Press: 89–96. JSTOR 1891669.
