= Fulton Market District =

District in Illinois, United States

Coordinates: 41°53′08″N 87°39′04″W

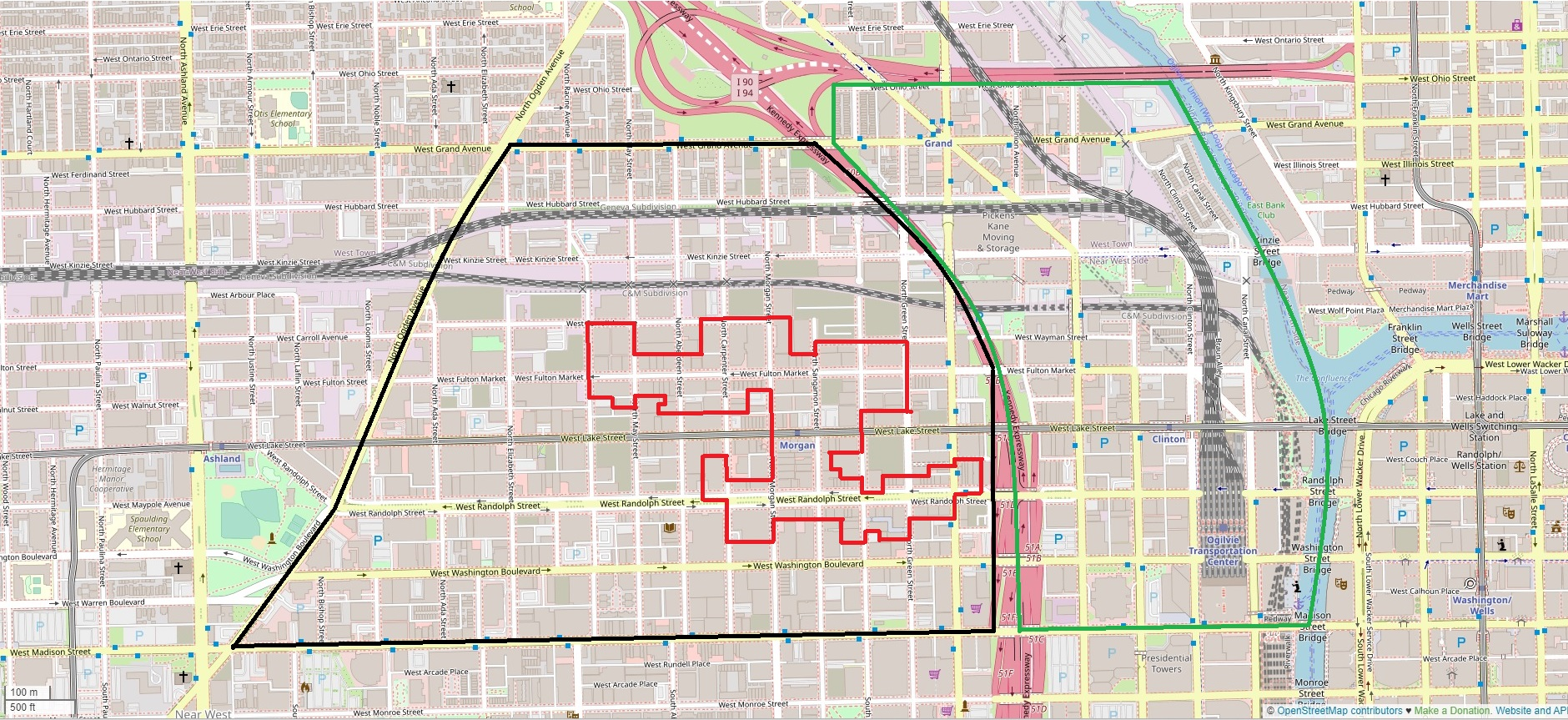
Map depicting the Fulton Market District and its landmarked subsection as well as the neighboring Fulton River District (green)

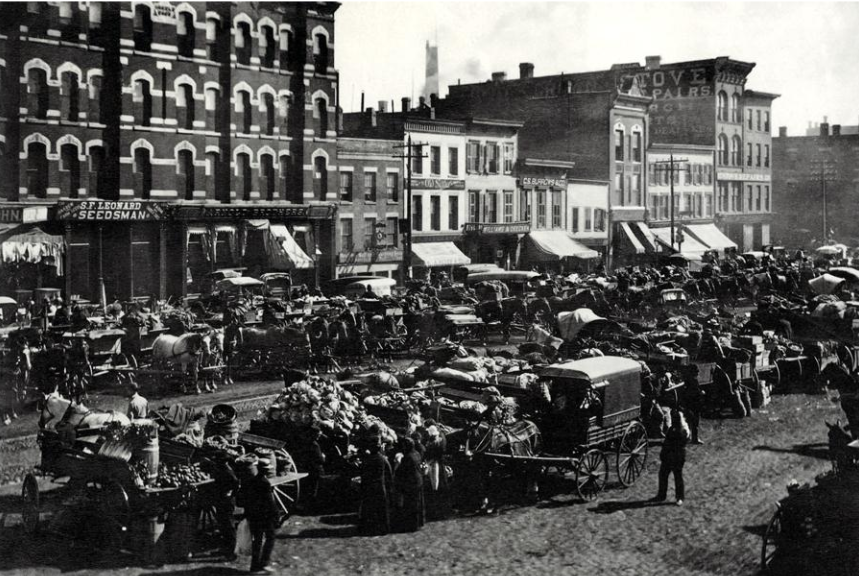
Looking east on Randolph street in Chicago 1880

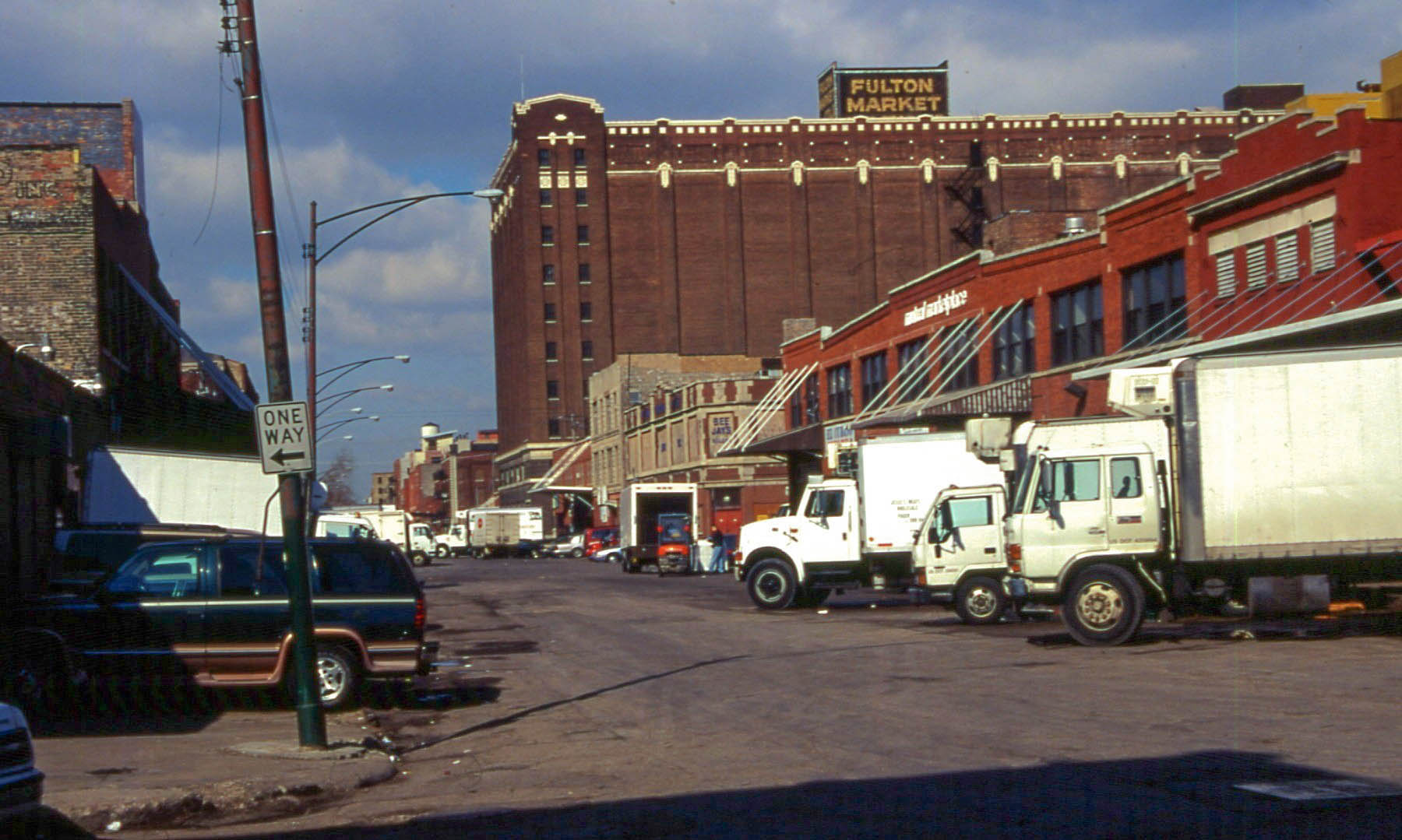
The market in 2002

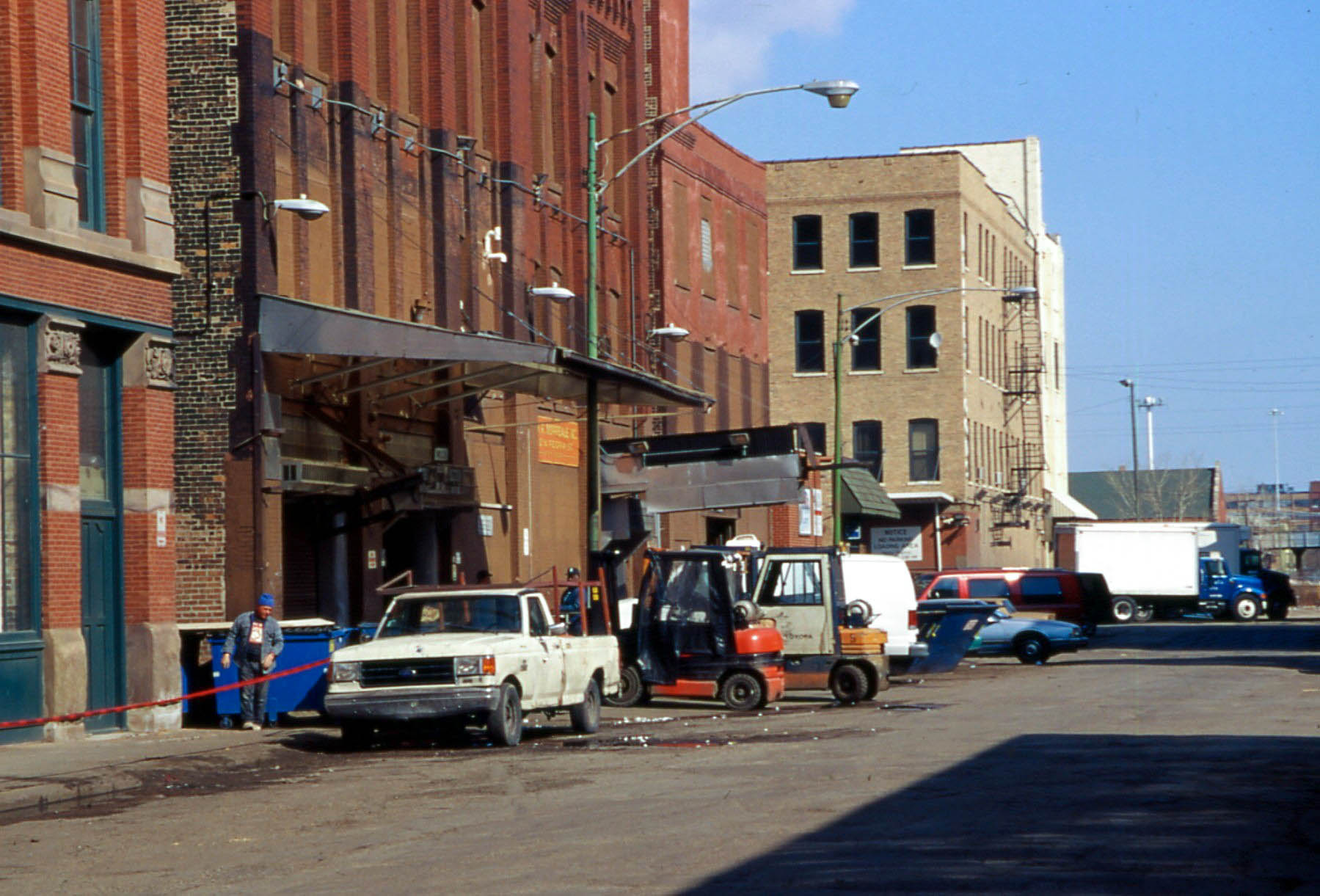
The market in 2002

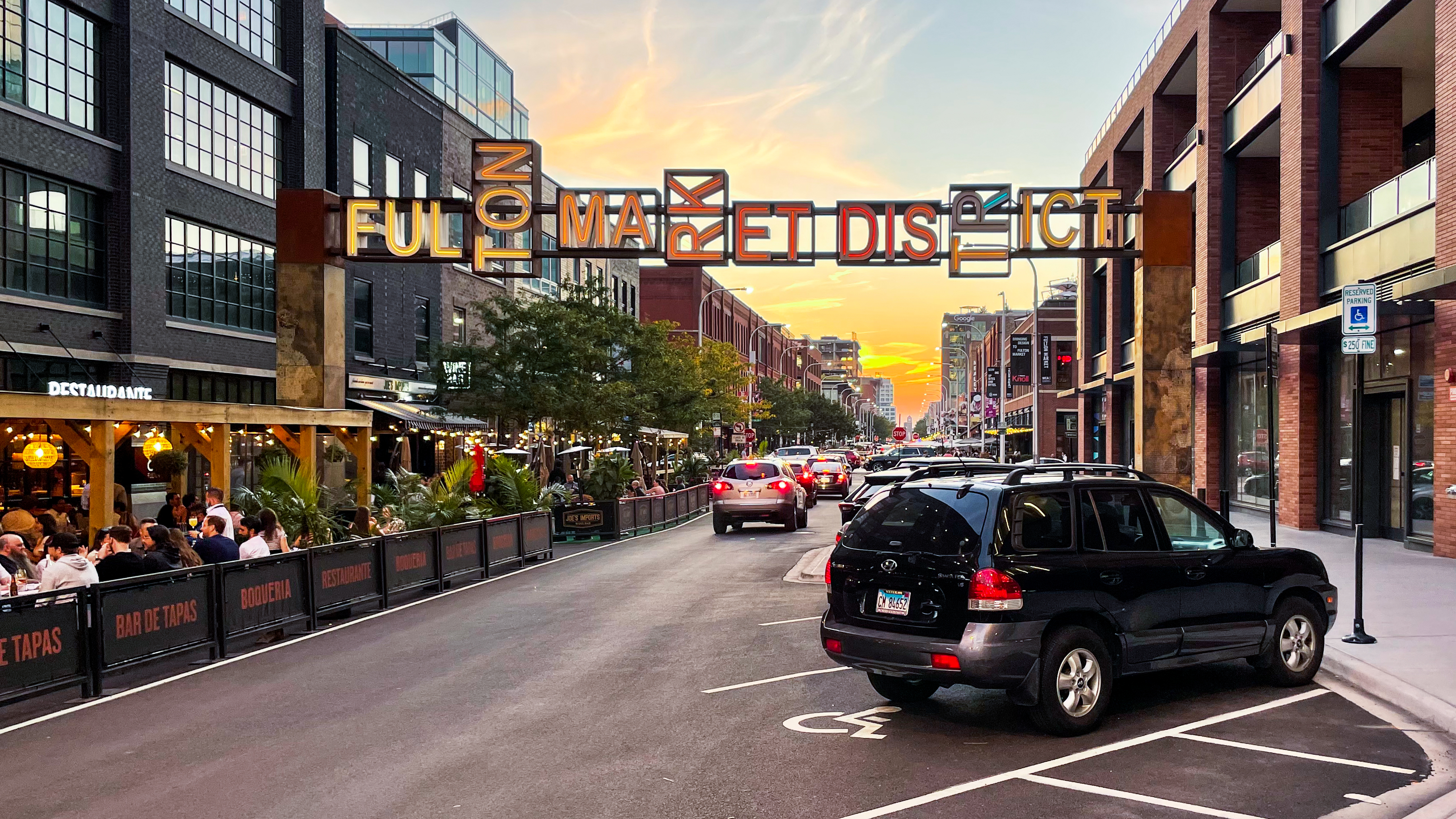
Seen from Fulton Street & Halsted Street in 2021

Fulton Market District is on the Near West Side of Chicago. In the 19th and 20th centuries, it served meat-packing, warehouse and industrial purposes, but has gentrified in the 21st century with corporate headquarters, tech industry, hotels, bars, restaurants, and retail. Randolph Street and Lake Street are the main East-West streets, and Halsted Street the major North-South artery. The district's name commemorates American inventor Robert Fulton and it is just across the expressway from the Fulton River District to the east.

A portion of the district (named the Fulton-Randolph Market District) was granted Landmark District status by the City of Chicago in 2015. The landmarked portion of the district is around 74 acres in size. It is served by the CTA's Green and Pink Lines at the Morgan 'L' station, as well as several bus routes. It borders the Warehouse District to the east, and the West Loop to the west. Fulton Market District has some of the highest value commercial real estate in the Chicago area.

In the 2010s it attracted both corporate and regional headquarters for many corporations including McDonald's, Google, Kimberly Clark, Dyson, Herman Miller, and Mondelez among others.
