= WLS-FM =

Classic hits radio station in Chicago

- Chicago, Illinois; United States
- Broadcast area: Chicago metropolitan area
- Frequency: 94.7 MHz (HD Radio)
- RDS: WLS-FM
- Branding: 94-7 WLS-FM

Programming
- Language: English
- Format: Classic hits
- Subchannels: HD2: Simulcast of WLS (talk radio)

Ownership
- Owner: Cumulus Media; (Radio License Holdings LLC)
- Sister stations: WKQX; WLS

History
- First air date: January 1, 1948
- Former call signs: WENR-FM (1948–1964); WLS-FM (1964-1971); WDAI (1971–1980); WRCK-FM (1980); WYTZ (1986–1991); WKXK (1996–1997); WXCD (1997–2001); WZZN (2001–2008)
- Call sign meaning: derived from sister station WLS

Technical information
- Licensing authority: FCC
- Facility ID: 73228
- Class: B
- ERP: 4,400 watts
- HAAT: 468 meters (1,535 ft)
- Transmitter coordinates: 41°52′43.9″N 87°38′9.1″W

Links
- Public license information: Public file; LMS
- Webcast: Listen live
- Website: www.947wls.com

WLS-FM (94.7 MHz) is a commercial classic hits FM radio station licensed to serve Chicago, Illinois. Owned by Cumulus Media, the station serves the Chicago metropolitan area, and is the radio home of Dave Fogel. The WLS-FM studios are located at the NBC Tower in the city's Streeterville neighborhood, while its transmitter is located at Willis Tower.

== History ==
=== Early years ===
The American Broadcasting Company (ABC), owners of Chicago's ABC Radio Network affiliate WENR (890 AM)—which operated in a time-share arrangement with WLS (890 AM), radio adjunct of the Prairie Farmer and itself an ABC affiliate—launched this station as WENR-FM on January 1, 1948. This time-share agreement ended in February 1954, when ABC's parent company American Broadcasting-Paramount Theatres and the Prairie Farmer merged their AM stations into one, WLS becoming the surviving entity and jointly owned by both. WENR-FM retained its call sign but began simulcasting WLS's programming, later adopting its own separate programming formats (which included classical and Broadway theater show tunes) for part of the day. ABC purchased the Prairie Farmer in November 1959, giving it sole ownership of WLS and WENR-FM.

In 1964, WENR-FM became WLS-FM, with a beautiful music format broadcasting in stereo from noon to midnight, as well as Blackhawks home games. By 1968, WLS-FM expanded its hours on the air to 6 a.m. to Midnight, simulcasting WLS (AM)'s Clark Weber morning show from 6 to 8 a.m. and carrying Don McNeill's Breakfast Club from 8 to 9 a.m.

In the summer of 1968, WLS-FM experimented with a locally produced underground progressive rock show. Dubbed "Spoke", and using the tag-line "The Flash That Holds The Wheel Of Life Together", the program aired from 10 p.m. to midnight and featured unnamed announcers using stage-whisper delivery laden with plate reverb, obtuse biker-style free verse intros delivered over backgrounds of electronic music, mid-eastern music and sound effects. It was replaced in 1969 with a syndicated program from the ABC Radio Network entitled "Love", voice-tracked by "Brother John" Rydgren, and which aired from 7 p.m. to 1 am. Shortly afterward, WLS-FM adopted a full-time progressive rock format.

=== Rock to disco to Top 40 and CHR ===
In 1970, ABC decided to change the call signs on all of their FM radio stations to distinguish them from their co-owned AM (and excluding two markets, TV) counterparts; this not only included WLS-FM, but WABC-FM in New York City, WXYZ-FM in Detroit, KXYZ-FM in Houston, KGO-FM in San Francisco, and KQV-FM in Pittsburgh. While ABC had originally selected WXAI as a replacement call sign for WLS-FM, WDAI for WXYZ-FM, and WRIF for WABC-FM, the FCC instead assigned WRIF as WXYZ-FM's replacement, and renamed WLS-FM as WDAI; WABC-FM selected WPLJ as a replacement call sign.

As part of this new FM initiative by ABC, all six FM stations dropped the "Love" progressive rock format and each adopted album-oriented rock formats. At age 19, Jim Kerr hosted mornings at WDAI and did additional work at WLS before finding future success at WPLJ and WAXQ. WDAI became the original Chicago radio home of Steve Dahl in January 1978, and used the slogan "Chicago's Best Rock" with the Morning Sickness with Steve Dahl.

WDAI switched to all-disco as "Disco DAI" at the stroke of midnight on New Year's Day, 1979, marking the switch by going from Don McLean's ""American Pie"" to "Stayin' Alive" by the Bee Gees. Steve Dahl would wind up the morning host at former crosstown rival WLUP, and would anchor the "Disco Demolition Night" promotion in July 1979, that would later be cited as a harbinger for the genre's popular collapse in America during 1980. The station stayed with the disco craze until 7 am on May 22, 1980, when, after stunting by playing Donna Summer's "Last Dance" on a loop, 94.7 became WRCK-FM, "95 W-ROCK", a hybrid of adult Top 40 and oldies, and featured Bob Sirott in mornings for a brief time. The 1978 switch to disco was the first in a series of format changes that continued up to its switch to classic hits in October 2012.

On October 20, 1980, WRCK-FM switched to a Top 40/CHR format with a partial simulcast of WLS (AM) and changed its call sign back to WLS-FM. The simulcast included Larry Lujack during the morning drive and Brant Miller's evening show into the mid-1980s, while airing its own programming during the day. WLS-FM was thereafter programmed separately during the day and simulcast WLS (AM) at night. Both WLS (AM) and WLS-FM simulcast selected concerts from ON TV and WSNS-TV, as well as WLS-TV's local music video show "Rock On Chicago" in stereo.

On January 20, 1986, WLS-FM ended simulcasting the AM and became known as WYTZ, "Z-95". Initially, the station retained its mainstream Top 40/CHR format. For a short period of time in mid-1989, the station slowly went towards a rock-lean, though it returned back to mainstream a couple of months later; at the time, competitor "B96" increasingly focused on R&B and dance music. WYTZ, which was briefly rebranded as "Hell" (an aborted and controversial one-week stunt) and then "Hot 94.7" in March 1991, became rhythmic for a short period of time. Despite the format tweaks, the station could not withstand the competition from "B96". This competition left "Q101" the only mainstream Top 40/CHR station in the Chicago area until "B96" went towards mainstream by late 1991-early 1992.

=== Rotating formats ===
WYTZ again became WLS-FM at 7 pm on October 25, 1991. After playing "Everybody's Talkin'" by Harry Nilsson, the station switched formats to talk radio, again simulcasting WLS (AM) much of the time. On June 13, 1994, WLS-FM split off from simulcasting and launched its own "Young Talk" format featuring former popular WKQX (Q101) morning host Robert Murphy ("Murphy in the Morning"), Rich Roeper, Rush Limbaugh (in simulcast with the AM), Jay Marvin, Lise Dominique, Turi Ryder and Johnny Vonn, as a way to compete against WLUP-FM's hot talk format. This failed to turn around ratings, and WLS-FM went back to a full-time simulcast once again with WLS (AM) on June 2, 1995.

After still achieving low ratings, WLS-FM separated from WLS (AM) again on November 22, 1995. After stunting with Christmas music throughout November and December, the station switched to a country music format and became "94.7 Kicks Country", WKXK, at Noon on December 26. The first song aired on "Kicks Country" was "Gone Country" by Alan Jackson. However, Infinity Broadcasting (now Audacy) station WUSN continued to do well as the heritage country station, while WKXK was unable to even achieve mediocre ratings.

On May 1, 1997, WKXK dropped the country format and flipped to classic rock, branded as "CD 94.7" (with new WXCD call letters being implemented on May 23). After some early ratings success, former heritage classic rocker and competitor WLUP-FM, which had earlier switched to a modern adult contemporary format, returned to the classic rock format, resulting in mediocre ratings at WXCD. WXCD abruptly dropped classic rock on November 29, 2000, and flipped to a 1980s hits format, rebranded as "The Zone", and changed its call sign to WZZN. The flip promptly led existing 1980s hits station WXXY to drop the format and flip to Spanish hits in January 2001. By July 2001, the station evolved into a gold-based modern AC format. On September 14, 2001, WZZN changed formats again to alternative rock to compete with WKQX, which previously had the format to itself.

By 2003, the station evolved into more of an active rock format, all the while using "94.7 The Zone" as its handle, and positioning itself on the air as "the hardest rock on the planet". However, the station continued to flounder in the ratings. By 2004, the station began beating WKQX with the shift to active rock, but yet beaten again by WKQX during the spring and summer of 2005, when WDRV moved from classic hits to classic rock and WLUP-FM from classic rock to mainstream rock.

=== Oldies years ===
After long-time oldies station WJMK dropped its 1960s and 1970s oldies format in June 2005 for a variety hits format branded as "Jack FM", at noon on September 26, 2005, WZZN dropped its active rock format (and the "Zone" branding) and flipped to oldies as "94.7 True Oldies", with programming from Scott Shannon's The True Oldies Channel except for morning and afternoon drive times, when the station aired local programming. The final song on "The Zone" was "For Whom the Bell Tolls" by Metallica, while the first song on "True Oldies" was "Rock and Roll Music" by The Beatles.

In 2006, the station added some local air personalities who were previously at WJMK when it was an oldies station. Eventually, the station was live and local (which included hosts such as John Landecker, Dick Biondi, and Greg Brown) except for overnights, when they would continue to run True Oldies Channel programming. In 2007, Walt Disney Company sold its ABC Radio radio division, including WLS (AM) and WZZN, to Citadel Broadcasting. From 2007 to 2008, the oldies format was modified to include a small amount of 1980s hits and a focus on oldies from 1964 to 1979. The station continued to play a couple pre-1964 oldies per hour.

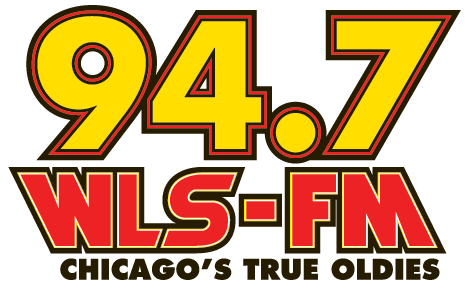
Former logo used between June 26, 2008, and October 1, 2012

On June 19, 2008, Citadel announced that WZZN would become once again WLS-FM. The WZZN call sign was dropped at Midnight on June 25, 2008 (with the final song on "True Oldies" being "Time Is on My Side" by The Rolling Stones), and as of 12:01 am on June 26, 2008, the station has officially been known as WLS-FM. The idea was to bring back the heritage of WLS and its old Top 40 format and jingles. The station was then branded as "94.7 WLS-FM" with the slogan "Chicago's Greatest Hits Of All Time". The first song on the current incarnation of WLS-FM was a special radio edit of "Life Is a Rock (But the Radio Rolled Me)" by Reunion, one played as a Top 40 hit on the original WLS which would explicitly mention the station in their lyrics; it would be cued up to launch the format by being preceded by a series of former WLS-FM jingles and a personal recorded reintroduction by Dick Biondi.Citadel merged with Cumulus Media on September 16, 2011.

=== Shift to classic hits ===
On October 1, 2012, WLS-FM modified its oldies format to a classic rock-leaning classic hits format. The Scott Shannon "True Oldies Channel" branding, programming, and voice tracking were removed. The pre-1964 oldies were dropped entirely, while Motown and 1970s pop and disco hits were cut back, and more 1980s songs were also added. The focus on the station was now hits of the 1970s and early 1980s with only several 1960s songs per hour. Morning DJ Dave Fogel was released to make room for Brant Miller's return to the station (Fogel was hired at WJMK just two days after being let go from WLS). Fred Winston was also hired as a full-time DJ in afternoons. In 2013, Robert Murphy was hired as an afternoon jock; Winston was let go.

On November 3, 2014, Jack Diamond, formerly of sister station WRQX in Washington, D.C., became WLS-FM's new morning show host, with Miller shifting to a co-hosting role. Diamond would leave the station in July 2015, with Miller re-assuming a main hosting role. Kim Berk, formerly of WWFS in New York, joined Miller as co-host in January 2016. Robert Murphy was released from the station in December 2016 to be replaced by Ron Parker (from WCBS-FM in New York) to handle afternoon duties. As of late 2017, the focus is now mainly hits of the 1970s through the early 1980s, with a small sampling of pre-1970/post-1989 and mid- to late-1980s and early 1990s hits mixed in due to the playlist being limited. The start of 2018 brought Dave Fogel back to WLS-FM as Berk's morning co-host, with Miller briefly moving to a weather reporting only position, until being released.

On November 17, 2017, WLS-FM became Chicago's only classic hits station when rival WJMK changed formats to classic hip-hop.

Following the shift to classic hits, the station would gradually downplay the connection to WLS (AM), including the phaseout of their signature five-note "sonic logo" in promotions in favor of simply saying the name without musical accompaniment at some undetermined point around 2015. The sonic logo would return to WLS-FM on March 11, 2024, with an updated package of other sonic branding from TM Studios calling back to 890 AM's musical legacy.

== See also ==
- List of three-letter broadcast call signs in the United States
