= WMVP =

ESPN Radio station in Chicago

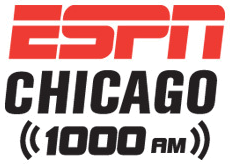
- Chicago, Illinois; United States
- Broadcast area: Chicago metropolitan area
- Frequency: 1000 kHz
- Branding: ESPN 1000; ESPN Chicago

Programming
- Language: English
- Format: Sports radio
- Network: ESPN Radio
- Affiliations: Chicago Bears; Chicago White Sox; Chicago Wolves; Northwestern Wildcats

Ownership
- Owner: Good Karma Sports; (Good Karma Broadcasting, L.L.C.)

History
- First air date: June 19, 1926
- Former call signs: WCFL (1926–1987); WLUP (1987–1993)
- Former frequencies: 610 kHz (1926–1927); 620 kHz (1927–1928); 970 kHz (1928–1941)
- Call sign meaning: Most Valuable Player

Technical information
- Licensing authority: FCC
- Facility ID: 73303
- Class: A
- Power: 50,000 watts (day); 37,000 watts (night)
- Transmitter coordinates: 41°32′32.1″N 88°02′5.2″W
- Repeater: 100.3 WTBC-FM HD2 (Chicago)

Links
- Public license information: Public file; LMS
- Webcast: Listen live; Listen live (via iHeartRadio)
- Website: goodkarmabrands.com/espn-chicago/

WMVP (1000 kHz) is a commercial AM radio station licensed to Chicago, Illinois, carrying a sports radio format. Owned by Good Karma Sports, the station serves the Chicago metropolitan area as the market affiliate of ESPN Radio, the flagship station of the Chicago Bears, Chicago White Sox, and the Chicago Wolves (the AHL affiliate of the NHL's Carolina Hurricanes) and is the home of local personalities David Kaplan, Tom Waddle and John Jurkovic. Formerly an ESPN Radio owned-and-operated station, WMVP's studios are co-located with WLS-TV in the Chicago Loop while the transmitter is located in Joliet. In addition to a standard analog transmission, WMVP is simulcast over the second HD subchannel of WTBC-FM and is available online.

From 1926 to 1987, 1000 AM was WCFL, the radio voice of the Chicago Federation of Labor. WMVP is a Class A radio station, broadcasting at 50,000 watts, the maximum power for commercial AM stations. It shares 1000 AM, a clear channel frequency, with KNWN in Seattle and XEOY in Mexico City. WMVP uses a directional antenna to avoid interfering with those other stations. WMVP's powerful nighttime signal allows it to be heard by listeners around the Midwestern United States and Central Canada.

== History ==
=== Early years ===
Edward Nockels

In 1922, the American Federation of Labor (AFL) began discussions regarding owning and operating its own radio station. By 1925, the AFL decided not to enter the broadcasting business but to purchase time for organized labor's message on commercially operated radio. The dream stayed alive with the Chicago Federation of Labor, who believed having an owned and operated radio station would be an effective way to spread its message. In 1924, the Federation gave its approval to work toward establishing a radio station. The original plan for WCFL called for it to be a non-commercial station, operating on the support of its listeners; in a sense it was one of the first large-scale efforts at public radio. Spearheading the drive to make WCFL a reality was the Federation's Secretary, Edward Nockels; without his efforts, there would have been no radio station at all.

WCFL officially began on December 4, 1925; the Federation's hopes were temporarily dashed when the US Department of Commerce–the regulator of radio broadcasting in the United States before the 1927 establishment of the Federal Radio Commission (FRC) and the 1934 establishments of the Federal Communications Commission (FCC)–refused to grant WCFL a wavelength on January 13, 1926. Just five days after what could have become an end to the station, the Federation announced it would go ahead with building it anyway.

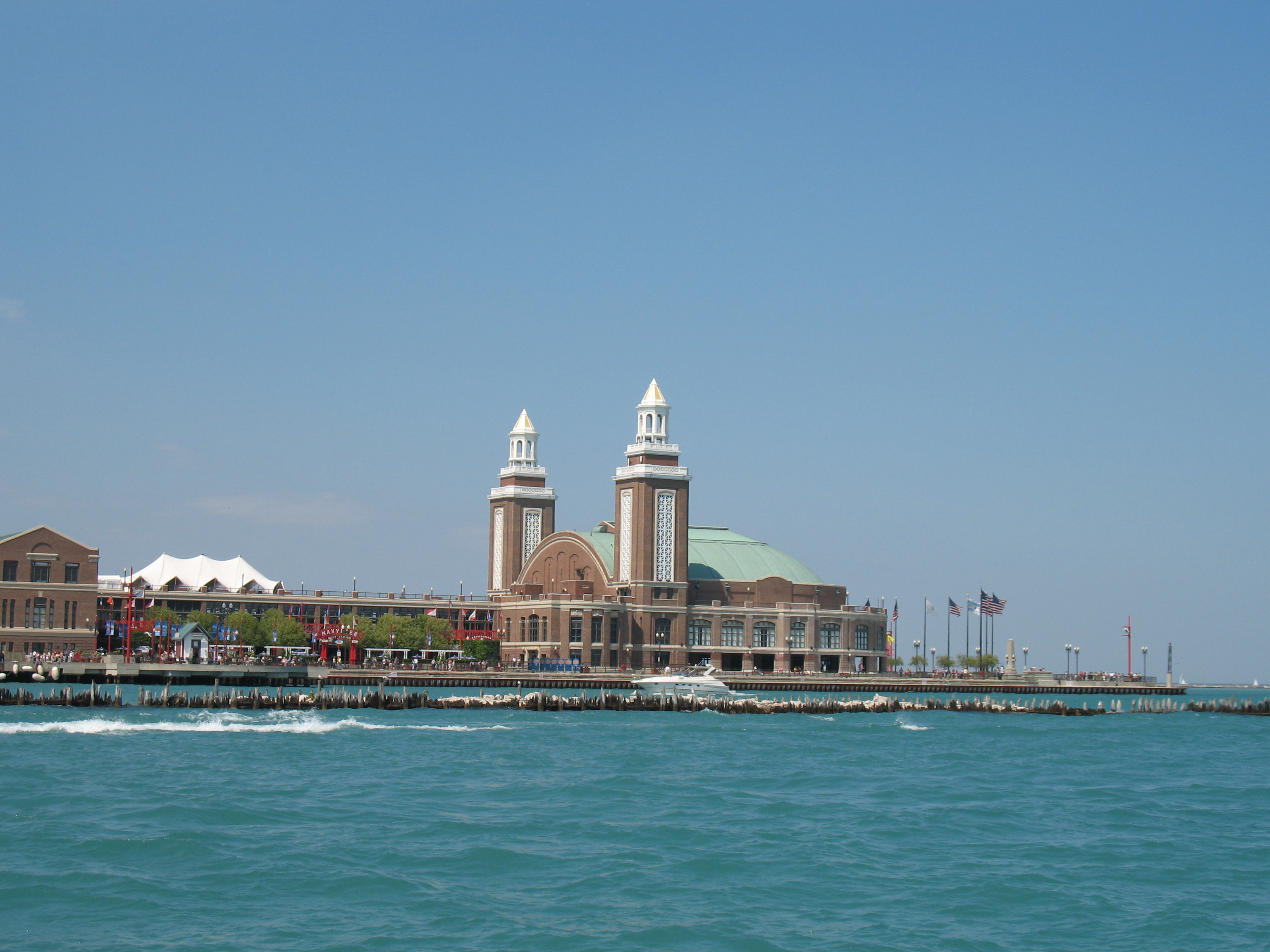
Navy Pier, where WCFL's first transmitter was located. The Downers Grove site went into operation in 1932.

The first WCFL transmitter stood on Chicago's Navy Pier (then called Municipal Pier); the Federation was able to lease the pier's North Tower for 10 years at $1 per year and its willingness to make WCFL available for city broadcasts. Initially the Illinois Manufacturers' Association attempted to keep WCFL off the air by protesting the use of public property for the station's transmitter and broadcasting site. The station purchased the land in Downers Grove for its eventual transmitter site in 1928 and broke ground there in 1932. The Federation originally purchased 100 acres (0.40 km^{2}) of land in the western suburb; 20 of them were allotted for the WCFL transmitter, while the other 80 were subdivided as lots for 258 homes and 72 businesses in "WCFL Park". Nockels believed having a union-based community spring up around the WCFL transmitter would be beneficial to both those purchasing lots and building homes and to the station itself. The labor union entered the real estate business shortly before the Great Depression hit. After selling no lots in the early part of the 1930s, the Federation put WCFL Park on hold, reviving it again in 1939 with the building of a model home on one of the lots, all of which would eventually be divested.

The station began operation in test broadcasts on June 19, 1926; the Commerce Department granted it the WCFL call sign on July 10, 1926. It was officially on the air the next day on 610 kHz, with 1,000 watts of power, one of the last non-profit radio stations to take to the airwaves. The first broadcast consisted of two hours of music. In November 1926, with an eye toward being self-sustaining, the Federation added a shortwave station to the Navy Pier transmitter site, planning to use WCFL Radio Telegraph to help offset broadcasting costs. The station initially used studios at Navy Pier, but during the winter of 1926–1927 found that the weather often made them inaccessible.

By 1927, WCFL was broadcasting from 623 South Wabash in Chicago (today the home of Columbia College, Chicago) producing a quarterly radio magazine, and operating on 620 kHz; the frequency being shared with the Lane Tech High School radio station, WLTS. In 1928, WCFL applied to the Federal Radio Commission for an increase in its transmitter power and hours of operation. Several other radio stations were now also operating on the 620 kHz frequency along with WCFL and the Lane Tech station. The commission disagreed with the reasoning that such increases were necessary to serve union members. Further, it cut the operating power of WCFL to only 1,500 watts. General Order 40 brought WCFL to the 970 kHz frequency, shared with KJR in Seattle, still at 1,500 watts and now allowed to operate in daylight only. The Federal Radio Commission had labeled the station as a "propaganda" type, not truly worthy of a license. The FRC would grant WCFL a 5,000-watt license in 1932, but it would take some years of expensive discussions to attain clear-channel, 50,000-watt status.

While the original idea of a self-supporting WCFL was based on each Federation member's donation of $1 a year for all station operating expenses, by 1926, 30% of the membership had donated. The donations continued to spiral downward as time passed, especially after 1928, when WCFL's operating power was cut and it was limited to "dawn to dusk" broadcasting—from sunrise to sunset. The dawn-to-dusk operation limitations were lifted in 1929, but there was still no clear channel yet for WCFL. That year, the station notified the Federation that unless members made their dollar donations, WCFL would need to implement some type of commercial broadcasting to stay afloat. This was the reason why the transmitter land had been purchased in 1928, but no construction was able to be done on the Downers Grove transmitter site until 1932. By 1930, commercials had become a reality on WCFL; the station did not show a profit until 1940.

In 1927, WCFL broadcast the Gene Tunney-Jack Dempsey championship boxing match at Soldier Field, challenging the National Broadcasting Company's exclusive claim to the event. This led to an arrangement whereby WCFL became one of three affiliates in Chicago of the Blue Network of NBC; WCFL broadcast non-sponsored, or sustaining, NBC programs not carried by WENR or WLS, as well as selected major sporting events and any broadcast speeches by union leaders aired by the network. WCFL became a member of the Mutual Broadcasting System in December 1949. When the Federal Communications Commission forced NBC to sell the Blue Network, WCFL's affiliation continued with the network through its new identity as the American Broadcasting Company, ending with the merger of WENR and WLS in 1959. Prior to this, the station offered selected programming from the network. WCFL was also to become an affiliate of the Amalgamated Broadcasting System in 1933, but that network collapsed after only a month of operations, prior to its planned westward expansion from New York. The usual broadcast day included dance and classical music, comedy, as well as radio programs in 11 different languages designed to reach out to Chicago's immigrant population.

=== Television, WCFL-FM, and evolution to Top 40 ===
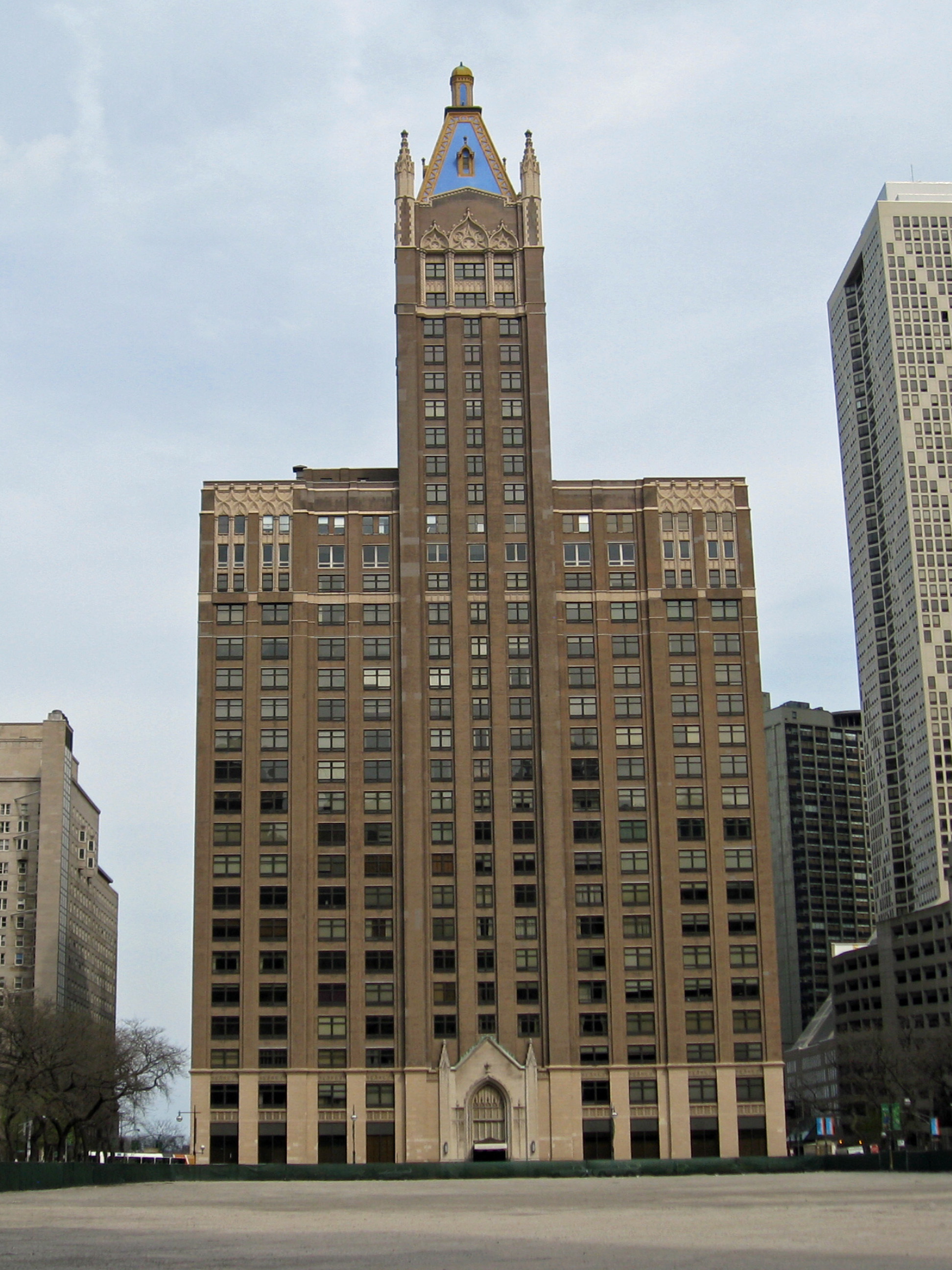
American Furniture Mart: Home to WCFL from 1931–1964.

WCFL was also involved in early experimental television broadcasts, and operated a shortwave repeater station, W9XAA, in the 1930s. This was the first television station in Chicago. On June 19, 1928, Ulises Armand Sanabria, a local television pioneer, made the first Chicago television broadcast using the WCFL Navy Pier transmitter to send the video portion of the signal and Chicago radio station WIBO for the audio portion. Those with receivers were able to see a head and shoulders view of Edward Nockels, the Federation secretary and driving force behind WCFL. It's also possible the broadcast was simulcast by the WCFL shortwave station, W9XAA. Accounts of later broadcasts at WMAQ specify their shortwave station was used for this purpose. As the Federation tried to revive their "WCFL Park" real estate project near the Downers Grove transmitter, the decision was made to abandon W9XAA in 1937, preferring to concentrate on gaining more transmitter power for WCFL. New Federal Communications Commission rules insisted that shortwave stations have a minimum of 5,000 watts of power; the cost to WCFL to upgrade to this level would have been around $10,000. In the 1941 NARBA reallocation, WCFL moved to 1000 kHz. The same year, it was granted a Class 1-B clear channel license, and increased its power to 10,000 watts. In 1948, its power was increased to 50,000 watts.

In the fall of 1937, the station was one of several Chicago radio stations to donate airtime to Chicago Public Schools for a pioneering program in which the school district provided elementary school students with distance education amid a polio outbreak-related school closure.

In 1948, the Federation was granted a license for an FM radio station, WCFL-FM on 104.3 MHz. Its transmitter was atop the American Furniture Mart, where WCFL's studios and offices had been located since 1931. WCFL-FM went on the air March 12, 1949, and simulcast its sister AM station's programming for six hours a day–from 3 p.m. to 9 pm. This time the Federation was impatient for its new radio station to become profitable, having gone from 1926 to 1940 before WCFL was "in the black". On January 10, 1950, WCFL-FM went off the air permanently; the Federation believed its dollars were better spent for its AM radio station. (Today, the frequency is occupied by WSCR-FM.)

During the 1940s, the Federation's thoughts turned once again to television, and in 1953, it applied for VHF channel 11 in Chicago. The Federation lost the bid to the city's educational groups, who would put WTTW on the air in 1955. An early 1960s try netted the Federation a license for Chicago UHF channel 38. In June 1968, plans were made for building a transmitter and antenna atop Chicago's John Hancock Center, as well as other construction needs to get WCFL-TV on the air. By late 1970, the Federation had begun to look at other uses for the station's license which did not involve the organization. Christian Communications purchased WCFL-TV in August 1975, with the FCC approving the license transfer in early 1976. At the time of the sale, WCFL-TV had yet to be on the air; it became WCFC-TV and, later, WCPX-TV.

The station carried general entertainment over the decades, but by the late 1950s, WCFL evolved into a popular music station, which had banned all Elvis Presley records from its playlist in late November 1957. The pre-Top 40 talent lineup included Dan Sorkin in the morning, Mike Rapchak following him and Sid McCoy's all-night jazz program. It was Sorkin who introduced a young Chicago comedian, Bob Newhart, to Warner Bros. in 1959. Bob Elson did both White Sox games and interviewed celebrities at The Pump Room; his sports cohort, Milo Hamilton, also wore two hats, talking football and playing music. Rapchak, who quit on the air in 1965 due to WCFL's new format, returned there in 1978, once again playing big band and jazz music.

=== Top 40 at the "Voice of Labor" ===
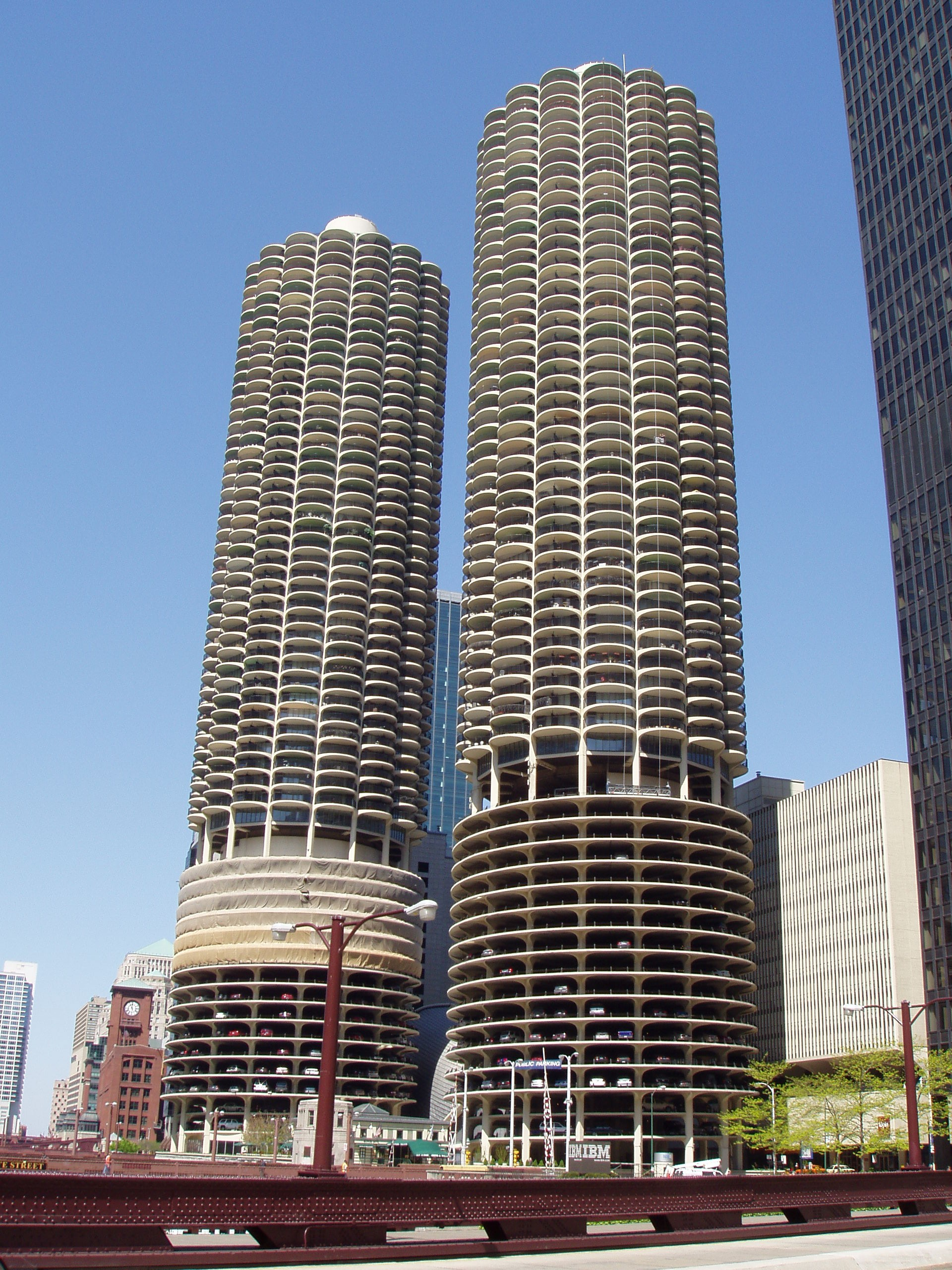
Marina City–WCFL's address from 1964 to 1985. The commercial building where the station was located is behind the towers.

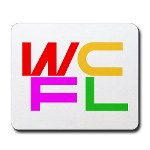
WCFL logo from 1965 to c. 1972

Between 1963 and 1965, WLS was the only Top 40 station in Chicago. This situation was unusual, as most major cities had two or even three stations featuring pop music. Consequently, WLS had become somewhat complacent as it had no real competitors. This all changed in 1965, when WCFL became a Top 40 music station, competing with WLS. The station also moved from the American Furniture Mart where it had been since 1931, to the then new Marina City, where it remained for the next 20 years. While the station itself was on the 16th floor of the Commercial Building (today the Hotel Chicago Downtown), WCFL also had a "VIP Room" on the fifth floor where the "WCFL VIPs" (DJs) hosted various events such as record parties and autograph sessions for listeners who were members of the WCFL VIP Club. One of the station's first promotions was the "Bold" campaign-describing itself as a bold, new way of presenting today's music and its listeners (who wore "I'm Bold!" buttons) as bold enough to want a change.

General Manager Ken Draper ran the station from 1965 to 1968 and brought many of the original staffers with him from the big Cleveland station KYW/WKYC he had run before. These included not only DJs but also chief engineer Mike King (later, Jim Loupas), and members of the crack newsroom team, which included the unstoppable Jeff Kamen. WCFL gained fame in 1966 when Kamen followed Chicago Civil Rights leader and comedy star Dick Gregory to Mississippi and was beaten by KKK members while reporting on a voter registration protest. The network TV film of the attack was seen by millions, with a still picture appearing on newspapers' front pages. Prior to Draper's establishment of an eight-person news department, news was gathered by taking the copy from the station's news wires and reading it on the air.

In their Top 40 years, some famous disc jockeys on WCFL included Jim Runyon, Joel Sebastian, Dick Williamson, (who was already with WCFL at the time of the format change), Jim Stagg, Ron Britain, ("America's First Psychedelic Disk Johnny"), who did a second stint at the station in 1978, the legendary Dick Biondi, whose Mutual Radio–syndicated Dick Biondi's Young America show was heard here three years before his actual arrival, Barney Pip, Ron Riley, and Sid McCoy and Yvonne Daniels with late night jazz during the earliest days of the change to Top 40. In late 1966, WKYC popular afternoon DJ Jerry Ghan (now Jerry G. Bishop) also decided to follow Draper to WCFL for morning drive. Later, WIND's former long-time morning man Howard Miller, who was a decided departure from the youthful staff, came to helm WCFL's 6-9AM spot in 1968. He was replaced before long by Clark Weber, long-time WLS morning man.

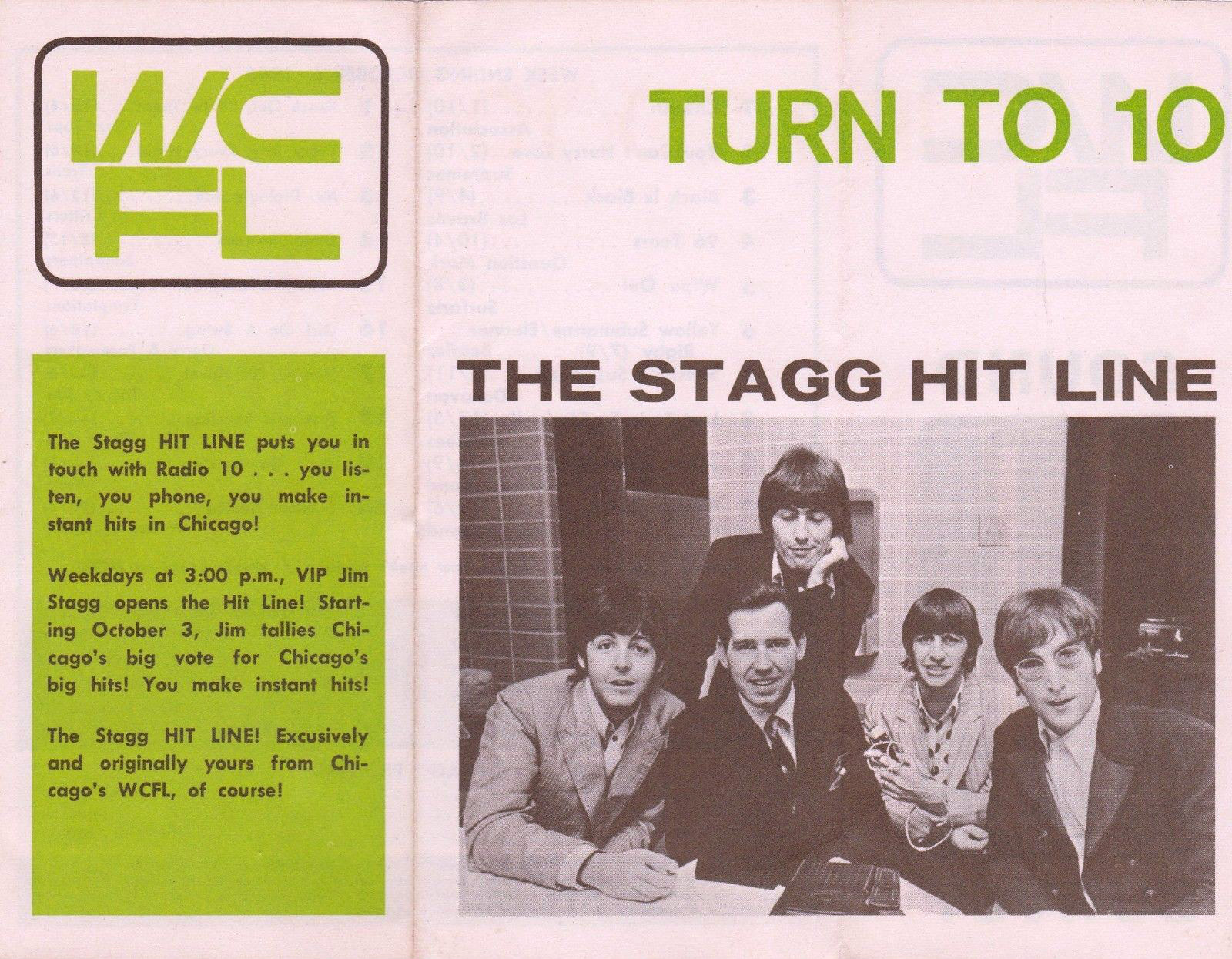
WCFL Sound 10 Survey, October 1966. Jim Stagg is shown with the Beatles.

The DJ secretary during this era was Connie Szerszen, who went on to forge her own career on the air in Chicago radio, appearing on WIND and other stations. WCFL general manager Ken Draper also hired Carole Simpson as one of radio's first female newscasters; Carole went on to a big career with ABC-TV. Also on staff at that time was continuity director Barbara Sternig, who left for Los Angeles once the Beatles broke up, became Rona Barrett's writer, and later Senior Reporter in Hollywood for the National Enquirer. Draper is also credited with the introduction of the Sound 10/WCFL survey, which became a competitor to the WLS "Silver Dollar Survey" that station issued weekly beginning in 1960. From 1966 to 1970, the station produced six "branded" record albums. Later in the "SuperCFL" era, Larry Lujack and Art Roberts came to WCFL.

WCFL's coverage of the Beatles 1965 and 1966 U.S. tours was provided by Jim Stagg, who traveled with the group. The station began a weekly British Countdown program with British DJ Paul Michael, in 1965.

During the late 1960s and early 1970s, WCFL also featured a popular Sunday night program of "underground" album-oriented music called Ron Britain's Subterranean Circus. Due to madcap DJ Britain's sure ear for the innovative and his highly inventive sketches, plus WCFL's powerful AM nighttime signal, these programs gained huge listenership not just in the Chicago area, but in other parts of the country as well. Britain's "Sub Circus" made WCFL one of the few AM stations to feature this kind of music, which was a major staple of "underground" FM stations. The station also supported local bands with its Sunday evening "Chicago Countdown", hosted by Ron Britain, featuring the recordings of Chicago area music groups.

The comedy feature Chickenman, a satire based on the Batman TV series, originated on Jim Runyon's morning drive-time show in the fall of 1966. It was created by WCFL staffer Dick Orkin, who was also brought from Cleveland to Chicago by Ken Draper. All the voices were done by Orkin, Runyon, and Jane Roberts, who also did WCFL's morning traffic reports as "Trooper 36-24-36" (She became Mrs. Jim Runyon.). The Chickenman program was subsequently syndicated to radio stations worldwide.

In August 1968, sales manager Lew Witz replaced Draper as WCFL general manager. Witz continued to make changes to the station during his tenure. It was Witz who lured Larry Lujack away from WLS in 1972, and the "less talk-more music" philosophy continued. On August 8, 1974, Richard Nixon announced his resignation from the office of President of the United States. The announcement occurred at 8 pm. Chicago time, but there was no acknowledgement of it on WCFL's airwaves until 11:30 pm. Witz defended his decision by saying there was ample local and national coverage of the story so there was no need to interrupt the music on WCFL. Gary Deeb, media critic for the Chicago Tribune, blasted Witz in print, saying it was this decision and many others like it that turned WCFL from, "a bright, civic-minded 50,000 watt rock powerhouse into a sonic slum". By the time the station prepared to enter its beautiful music phase in early 1976, Witz had totally done away with WCFL's news department. Under the management of Witz, the station's turntables used for transferring music onto tape cartridges for broadcast were speeded up from 45rpm to 48rpm. This was meant to make for a "brighter sound" than the station's main rival, WLS, and meant that since it was faster, more music could be aired. Witz also insisted his on-air personalities broadcast false time checks, in the event listeners might be part of Arbitron ratings households.

An internet radio tribute station to this era of WCFL was launched on Labor Day 2013, including original airchecks, commercials, jingles and Chickenman episodes; jingle producer TM Productions waived its licensing fees to assist J. R. Russ, developer of the internet station.

=== The end of "Super CFL" and the sale to Mutual ===
On March 15, 1976, after two years of falling ratings, WCFL abruptly dropped its Top 40 format in favor of The World's Most Beautiful Music, leaving WLS as Chicago's only AM Top 40 station. Station management released all disc jockeys who did not have "no cut" clauses in their contracts with the official explanation of the format change as "being more in keeping with the labor movement". Larry Lujack, still under contract with the station, stayed on at WCFL playing easy listening music until moving back to WLS in September 1976. The easy listening format was already heard in stereo on FM beautiful music stations WLOO and WLAK. By 1978, the easy sounds were replaced by a gold-based adult contemporary format.

WCFL and the Chicago Federation of Labor enjoyed the support of Mayor Richard J. Daley throughout his 1955–1976 administration. He proclaimed January 11, 1966, as "WCFL Day in Chicago" to mark the 40th anniversary of the station. In 1976, when it became evident it was time for the Federation to sell the radio station, Federation President William A. Lee turned to his long-time friend, Mayor Daley, for advice.

After deciding its profit margin was too small for the Chicago Federation of Labor to maintain, on April 10, 1978, it was announced that WCFL would be sold to the Mutual Broadcasting System, at the time a subsidiary of the Amway Corporation, for $12 million. The history of the first and longest-lived labor radio station was over; after nearly 52 years, the "Voice of Labor" had been stilled. The station began to identify itself as "Mutual/CFL". A magazine-type news/talk format was adopted, with sports talk in the evening hours and Mutual's Larry King Show overnight, but ratings remained low. In January 1981, WCFL flipped to a middle of the road format playing adult standards and pop hits of the 1950s and 1960s mixed in with some softer oldies and AC cuts, and even a few currents. Ratings were still low; and later that year, WCFL evolved into an adult contemporary format.

=== Religious years ===
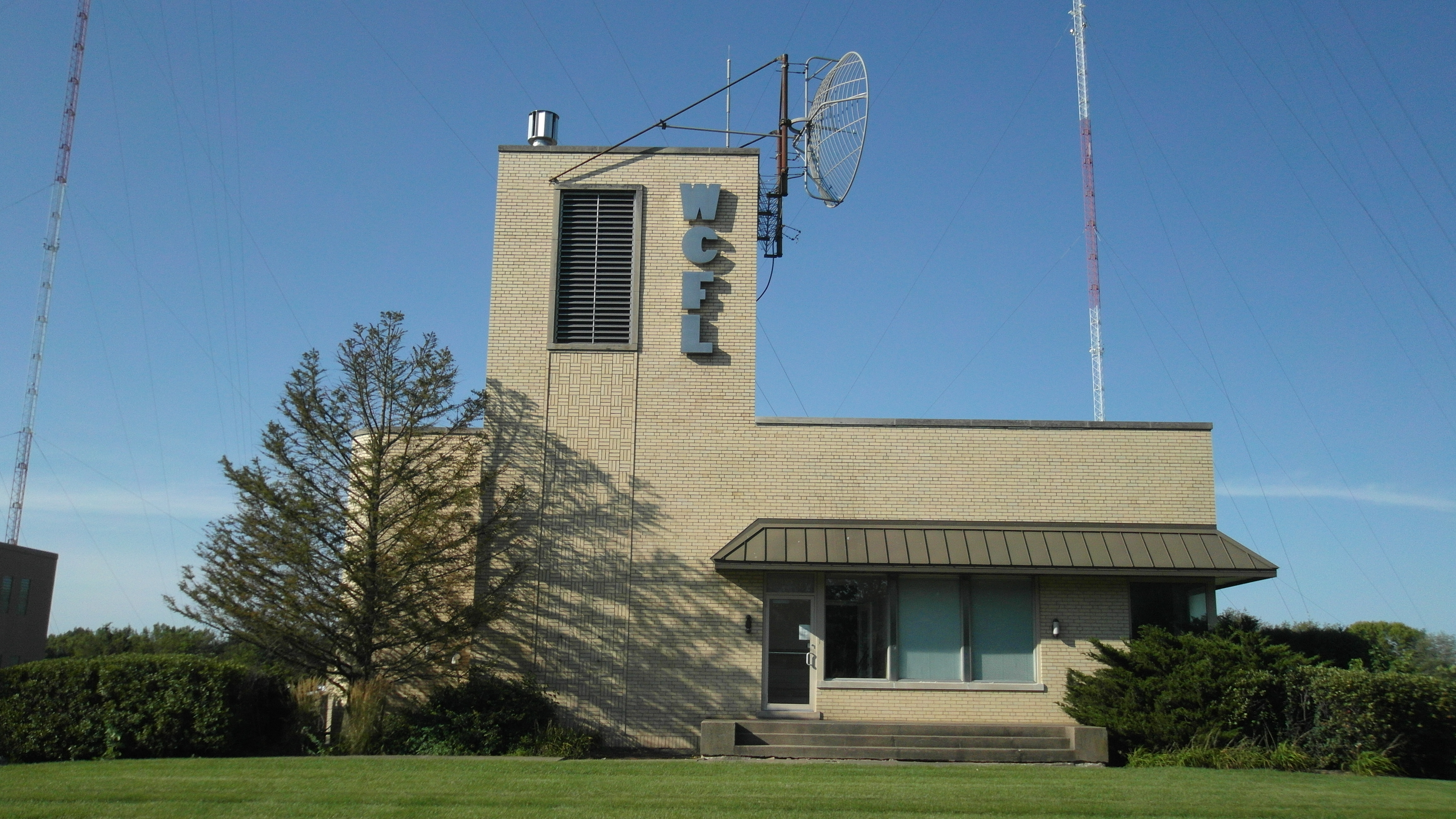
WMVP's former transmitter building in Downers Grove, still displaying the WCFL call sign

On November 4, 1983, WCFL was sold by Mutual to Statewide Broadcasting. Statewide switched WCFL to adult contemporary Christian music about 10 hours a day and teaching programs the rest of the time on May 22, 1984. WCFL sold brokered programming in 30-minute blocks of time to Christian radio organizations and preachers. The format was profitable but received low ratings. At that time, WCFL advertised its call letters as standing for "Winning Chicago For The Lord". In early 1985, the station moved from Marina City into the backup studio at its original transmitter building in Downers Grove. Statewide Broadcasting specialized in religious formats but merged with a secular company called Heftel Broadcasting in early 1987. Although no longer in use, the former call letters WCFL, rendered massively in stainless steel, remained on the exterior wall of the transmitter building off 39th Street in Downers Grove.

=== 1000 WLUP ===
Following the Heftel takeover, WCFL remained religious alongside AOR-formatted WLUP (which had been purchased by Heftel in 1979) until just after the stroke of midnight on April 29, 1987. The call letters of the station were changed to WLUP, and its FM sister station became WLUP-FM. WLUP-FM remained an AOR station, while WLUP switched to a full service rock format focusing on personality, comedy and talk programs with a few rock cuts an hour. After 7 pm, WLUP and WLUP-FM simulcast the AOR format until dawn. As it concentrated on Spanish radio, Heftel sold its English-language stations, including WLUP-AM-FM; Evergreen Media bought WLUP-AM-FM in 1988. From October 1992 until August 1993, WLUP (AM) was the first Chicago affiliate for The Howard Stern Show.

=== WMVP ===
ESPN 1000 logo used from 2008 to 2012.

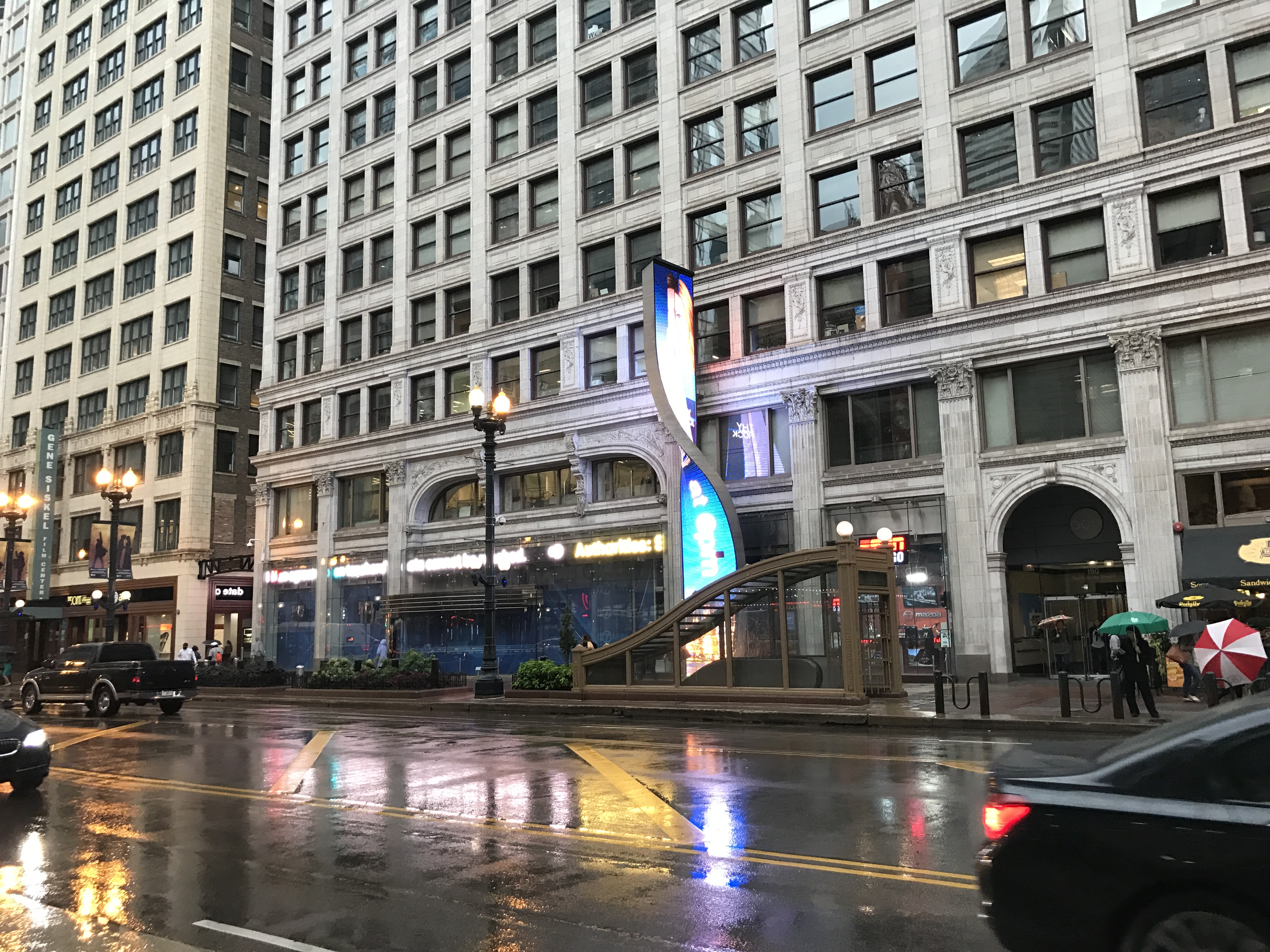
WMVP's former streetside studio on North State Street with WLS-TV, located in front of the entrance to the Lake station for the CTA Red Line.

Initially, the AM and FM stations remained the same under Evergreen. But on September 27, 1993, WLUP-FM switched to a full-service talk/comedy format, while WLUP (AM) became all-sports. To differentiate between WLUP-FM and to reflect the new format, WLUP's call sign changed to WMVP, for "Most Valuable Player". WMVP's schedule included some nationally syndicated shows such as The Fabulous Sports Babe and Ferrall on the Bench as well as play-by-play of local sports games. Despite broadcasting 24/7, the station trailed in the ratings to (at the time) daytime-only WSCR (820 AM) and to WMAQ's Sports Huddle at night. WMVP dropped its all sports format at 6 a.m. on June 5, 1996, the day before the Chicago Bulls opened the NBA Finals against the Seattle SuperSonics, and returned to mostly simulcasting WLUP-FM. WMVP did carry its own night-time sports talk program, and play-by-play broadcasts of the White Sox, Blackhawks and Bulls, and would later air some shows from hosts who were moved over from the FM beginning that September.

Evergreen later merged with Chancellor and sold WLUP-FM to Bonneville International in July 1997, with WMVP permanently splitting from WLUP-FM. WMVP began airing its own talk/sports format, simply called "AM 1000". In August 1998, WMVP was sold by Chancellor to Disney–ABC, and flipped back to sports on October 12, this time affiliated with co-owned ESPN Radio.

=== Good Karma Brands takeover ===
On August 28, 2019, it was announced by ESPN Radio that day-to-day management of the station would move from direct purview by ESPN to a management agreement with Good Karma Brands (GKB), a company owned by Craig Karmazin which has had sustained success running ESPN Radio stations to the north in Madison and Milwaukee, along with Cleveland and West Palm Beach, Florida. General manager, Jim Pastor, retired at the end of the year, with Good Karma beginning to operate the station on September 29, 2019, under a lease with Disney.

The lease made WMVP a sister station to GKB's Milwaukee cluster of WTMJ, WKTI, WGKB, and WAUK, and the Madison market's WTLX (WTMJ carries a local news/talk format, with WGKB airing local format of Black talk). No changes to personnel and facilities in the near future were expected under the lease agreement, though the station's morning schedule was adjusted in August 2020 due to the national network's large-scale schedule overhaul.

In late June 2021, GKB entered into an agreement with Hubbard Broadcasting to simulcast WMVP in HD Radio, over WSHE-FM's HD2 subchannel to allow FM access to the station in some manner. In December 2021, Andrew Marchand of the New York Post reported that GKB planned to acquire WMVP outright. The deal was filed with the FCC on December 20, and did not include WMVP's transmitter site. The purchase was consummated on March 1, 2022. In August 2023, Good Karma applied to the FCC to move WMVP's transmitter from its longtime site in Downers Grove to WCPT's transmitter site near Joliet. In May 2025, building infrastructure at the Downers Grove site was demolished; in June 2025, the radio towers were dismantled to pave way for a subdivision consisting of 35 single-family homes.

On November 1, 2022, the NFL's Chicago Bears announced that they would move their radio flagship to WMVP starting in the 2023 season, replacing a 22-season long stint with WBBM.
