= Ed Schwartz =

American radio host (1946–2009)

"Chicago Ed" Schwartz
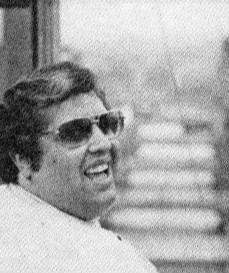
- Schwartz at WIND in 1976
- Born: Ed Schwartz; May 5, 1946; Chicago, Illinois, U.S.
- Died: February 4, 2009 (aged 62); Waukegan, Illinois
- Presenting career
- Stations: WIND (AM); WGN (AM); WLUP

Ed Schwartz (May 5, 1946 – February 4, 2009) was a Chicago media personality who hosted local late-night radio programs from the mid-1970s to the mid-1990s. He was nicknamed "Chicago Ed."

== Early life and education ==
A native of the Southeast Side of Chicago, Schwartz' interest in radio began as a youngster with the gift of a portable radio from his grandparents. He fell asleep each night tuned to the Jack Eigen Show on WMAQ (AM). When his part-time high school job took him to the WLS (AM) studios for a delivery, WLS personality Dex Card invited Schwartz to come into the studio and watch him broadcast. The experience made him even more determined to secure a job in radio. Schwartz graduated from Bowen High School, and then attended Columbia College where he studied radio production. Some of Schwartz' classmates included Pat Sajak, Bob Sirott, and Bruce DuMont; he was the first of the group to get a broadcasting job. Schwartz also attended Triton College where he became a certified paramedic.

== Professional career ==
After working as a gofer at WLS (AM) and WIND (AM), where he was hired as the music librarian, Schwartz became a full-time late-night host at WIND in 1973. Ed Schwartz did not have a voice that was naturally suited for radio. His multiple attempts to win an on-air position at both WLS-AM and WIND had failed, but feeling he had something to offer the public via the airwaves, Schwartz never gave up his hopes.

The beginning of his on-air career was something of an accident. A half-hour before airtime, the usual late-night radio personality phoned the station to say he would not be in. WIND had made no arrangements for a replacement because of such short notice. Schwartz was there and was asked to fill in. It soon became his full-time overnight job, as the audience liked his style of honestly speaking his mind and addressing community concerns. During his programs, Schwartz led discussions on local Chicago issues, inviting listeners to call in with their problems so that Schwartz and the listening community could offer some assistance. He frequently telephoned aldermen in the middle of the night to inform them of listener complaints, and he held open forums on racism, poverty, and health care. While still at WIND, Schwartz started a dating service for listeners of his show. There were 22 weddings before management made the decision to close it down because of possible legal issues.

Ed Schwartz enlivened late-night radio—tracking news stories and doing various types of interviews, along with his willingness to use the power of the media to solve listeners' problems. While other late-night radio programs set a tone of quiet entertainment or discussion, Schwartz's shows kept a pace like those done at earlier times of the day. Another regular feature of Schwartz's radio shows was his Chicago History programs. Schwartz' panel of experts would gather at the studio and invite listener questions; stumping the panel meant winning a prize. At the end of these shows, both the panel and the audience learned something about the history of the city. The interviews Schwartz did with local television personalities provided much historic background for a book on Chicago children's television, The Golden Age of Chicago Children's Television. His interviews with Frazier Thomas and Ray Rayner are cited in the book; he is mentioned in the authors' acknowledgments.

In 1982, at the suggestion of popular WGN radio host Bob Collins, Schwartz moved his program to the more powerful WGN (AM), where he began his Good Neighbor Food Drive. This event annually raised up to $200,000 while collecting several tons of food; it was the largest one-day food drive in the United States. According to Schwartz, the food drive was initially a response to mayor Jane Byrne's decision to spend several thousand dollars on fireworks while Chicago food pantries were struggling to feed the homeless. Schwartz's generous deeds brought him much attention throughout the Chicago area, and by 1992, his program was reaching nearly 380,000 listeners a week and was considered the top-rated overnight radio show in Chicago. Even though Schwartz was no longer on the air in 1996, WMAQ (AM) played host to the food drive and invited him to preside over it on their airwaves. WBBM-AM has hosted this annual holiday event since 1997.

Rival radio personalities, especially those at WLUP, frequently ridiculed Schwartz's upbeat radio program and made light of his battles with obesity. Kevin Matthews, for example, portrayed a character named "Ed Zeppelin”. This character sang parody songs about food and overeating; another was Steve Dahl. Schwartz rarely acknowledged their barbs, however, and actually accepted an offer to join WLUP in 1992. However, Schwartz failed to attract the same number of listeners he enjoyed while at WGN, due in large part to a constantly changing time-slot, and he parted ways with WLUP in 1995. Afterward, Schwartz became a columnist for Lerner Newspapers, which published neighborhood-specific periodicals throughout the Chicago area.

A few weeks before his death, Schwartz made his last appearance on radio with host Geoff Pinkus at his old station, WIND.

== Health problems and death ==
Schwartz was diagnosed with renal failure in September 2005, not long after he was no longer writing his column. Several radio colleagues began organizing fund-raisers to help pay for his medical treatment. After spending a year in a nursing facility, Schwartz returned home in 2006 and began writing a novel based on his life experiences. However, Schwartz continued to suffer from kidney and heart problems, and died on February 4, 2009, aged 62. He was laid to rest under sunny skies after graveside services at Jewish Waldheim Cemetery in Forest Park.
