= K. Patrick Okura =

- Occupation: Psychologist
- Spouse: Lily A. Okura
- Awards: Japanese American of the Biennium (1978); American Psychological Association Lifetime Achievement Award (2002)

Academic background
- Education: University of California, Los Angeles

Kiyoshi Patrick Okura (1911 – 2005) was a Japanese American psychologist and civil rights leader. He and his wife Lily were among the 120,000 Japanese Americans imprisoned in internment camps during World War II. In 1990, as two of 65,000 survivors, Okura and his wife Lily were each granted a $20,000 check and a written apology from President George H. W. Bush for wrongful detention. He and his wife used their checks to educate Asian-American mental health and human services professionals about policy development.

Okura was named Japanese American of the Biennium by the Japanese American Citizens League in 1978. Other honors include an honorary doctorate awarded by the Philips Graduate Institution in 2001 and the American Psychological Association Lifetime Achievement Award in 2002. The Kun-Po Soo Award from American Psychiatric Association Committee of Asian-American Psychiatrists was awarded posthumously to Okura in 2005. Okura was also honored by the emperor of Japan in 1999.

== Biography ==
Okura was born in 1911 and grew up in the South Bay region of Los Angeles, CA as the first son of a family of Japanese immigrants. Okura attended the University of California, Los Angeles where he obtained a B.A. in 1933 and a M.A. in 1935 at UCLA. Notably, Okura was the first Asian American to receive a Master's degree in Psychology at the university and the first Japanese American to play on the UCLA varsity basketball team.

In 1938, Okura had reportedly begun working as a personnel examiner with the city of Los Angeles Civil Rights Commission and he became the city's highest-ranking Japanese American. He was accused by a newspaper columnist of plotting to sabotage the city's water and power plants. This accusation occurred right before President Franklin Roosevelt signed Executive Order 9066 authorizing the forced relocation and internment of 120,000 Japanese Americans. Okura and his wife, who had both been interned at the Santa Anita Assembly Center, were taken out of the camp by Rev. Edward Flanagan who obtained permission to retrieve 50 Japanese Americans to come to Omaha, NE to replace workers. Okura was offered a position as Boys Town's staff psychologist and held the position for 17 years.

In 1971, Okura relocated to the Washington area and held an executive assistant position to the director of the National Institutes of Health, where he began launching programs to address social problems in minority communities.

Okura was President of the Japanese American Citizens League for two years starting in 1962. He participated in the first March on Washington for Jobs and Freedom in 1963, and was involved in efforts seeking reparations from the U.S. Government from Japanese Americans incarceration during WWII. Okura served as the Executive Assistant to the Director of the National Institute of Mental Health from 1971 to 1981 and helped to launch programs that addressed the social issues prevalent in many minority communities.

Okura founded the Okura Mental Health Leadership Foundation in 1988. The foundation was established as leadership development for minority individuals who wanted to become mental health professionals and awards grants through the American Psychological Foundation and the Asian American Psychological Association. He was also inducted into the Montgomery County, Md., Human Rights Hall of Fame, in the year 2002.
