= Q101 (internet radio) =

Internet radio station in Chicago, Illinois (2011–2022)

Q101 Chicago
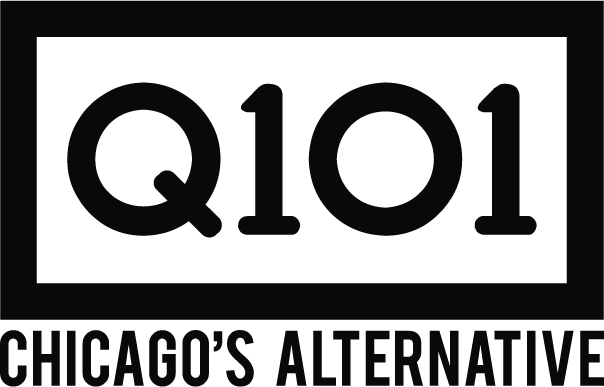

Chicago, Illinois; United States
- Broadcast area: Chicago metropolitan area Worldwide
- Frequency: Online only
- Branding: Q101 Chicago

Programming
- Language: English
- Format: Modern rock

Ownership
- Owner: Broadcast Barter Radio Networks

History
- First air date: July 15, 2011
- Last air date: April 18, 2022

Q101 Chicago is a former commercial internet radio station based in Chicago, Illinois, that operated from June 2011 to April 2022. Owned by Broadcast Barter Radio Networks, the station streamed a modern rock format promoted as a "continuation" of "Q101," the intellectual property and related trademarks of Chicago-licensed terrestrial radio station WKQX (101.1 FM) between 1992 and 2011 (divested from then-station owner Emmis Communications in July 2011). While this station reverted to a modern rock format in 2014 following a subsequent ownership change, it opted to brand instead as "101WKQX".

Q101 Chicago ceased operations after current WKQX owner Cumulus Media repurchased the brand and all related assets in April 2022, restoring the "Q101" brand onto WKQX on May 3, 2022.

== History ==
On June 21, 2011, WKQX (101.1 FM) and sister station WLUP (97.9 FM) were sold by then-owner Emmis Communications to Merlin Media, who had plans to launch an all-news station on WKQX's frequency. That July 14, the day before Merlin was to take over both stations via a local marketing agreement, Emmis divested the intellectual property of "Q101" – the name, history from 1992 to 2011, logos, social media profiles, trademarks and domain name – to Broadcast Barter Radio Networks, headed by Matt Dubiel and Mike Noonan. Consequently, the Internet stream of WKQX ceased as a stream of the station at midnight and began programming separately as a new streaming service, initially without DJs or commercials, under the "Q101.com" name. Thus, July 15, 2011, can be regarded as the "start date" for the current "Q101 Chicago."

Upon taking over WKQX, Merlin Media changed the station's callsign to WWWN, then to WIQI; the WKQX calls were "parked" on a then-silent radio station in Watseka, Illinois owned by Merlin Media's CEO. Then, on April 30, 2012, Merlin Media began leasing WLFM-LP, a low-power analog television channel broadcasting on analog channel 6 but whose aural power is receivable at 87.7 MHz, changed the callsign to WKQX-LP and launched a modern rock format of their own as "Q87.7." At the same time, the operators of "Q101 Chicago" began a simulcast of their audio stream at various times on WJJG (1530 AM), an AM radio station licensed to operate during the daytime hours managed by Matt Dubiel, one of the people behind BBRN. BBRN then filed a trademark infringement suit against Merlin Media following the launch of "Q87.7"; the case would be settled out of court.

WIQI and WLUP were taken over by Cumulus Media in a local marketing agreement announced on January 3, 2014; the modern rock format heard on "Q87.7" would be moved over to WIQI, which concurrently changed back to the WKQX callsign. After a month-long simulcast period with WKQX-LP with oblique "101.1 FM" branding, WKQX was relaunched as "101WKQX" on February 17, 2014, with no connection to "Q101 Chicago" and would not use the "Q101" moniker.

On April 18, 2022, current WKQX owner Cumulus Media announced it had acquired all trademarks and IP relating to Q101 Chicago, including ownership of the stream, and would be re-placing the brand back onto the 101.1 frequency shortly thereafter. Cumulus Chicago Vice President/Market Manager Marv Nyren reported to Daily Herald journalist Robert Feder that discussions had been ongoing for over four years to reach a deal with Dubiel to reacquire the rights to the brand.
