= Chickenman (radio series) =

American radio series

- Running time: 1-2 minutes
- Country of origin: United States
- Language: English
- Home station: WCFL
- Syndicates: 1,500 total, including Armed Forces Radio
- Created by: Dick Orkin
- Recording studio: Chicago, Illinois
- Original release: 1966

Chickenman was an American radio series created by Dick Orkin that spoofs comic book heroes, inspired by the mid-1960s Batman TV series. The series was created in 1966 at Chicago radio station WCFL, and was then syndicated widely, notably on Armed Forces Radio during the Vietnam War. According to the radio show This American Life, "Chickenman first soared the radio airwaves from 1966 to 1969; nearly every day there would be a new episode. The episodes are each about one or two minutes in duration. The program’s distribution spread to over 1,500 radio stations. According to the people who syndicate Chickenman, it has been translated into German, Dutch, and Swedish."

In the series, Benton Harbor, a shoe salesman at a large downtown Midland City department store, spends his weekends striking terrific terror into the hearts of criminals everywhere as that fantastic feathered fighter, Chickenman. Or, at least, that's what he tells everyone. In reality, he mostly hangs around the Police Commissioner's office and irritates the Commissioner's secretary, Miss Helpinger.

Each episode begins with an overly-dramatic theme, a four-note trumpet sound echoed with Benton Harbor's "Buck-buck-buck-buuuuuck" chicken call, which is followed by a rousing cry of "Chicken-mannnn!" and voices shouting, "He's everywhere! He's everywhere!" This tagline became a memorable catchphrase, especially because it's repeated again at the end of each episode, two and a half minutes later.

In 1973, Orkin added special weekend episodes called Chickenman vs. the Earth Polluters. In 1976, a special LP was created by Orkin and Bert Berdis: Chickenman Returns, and an updated radio show in 1977, Chickenman Returns for the Last Time Again.

== History ==
Chickenman was created in 1966 by Dick Orkin, at the time a production director at WCFL in Chicago. WCFL's Program Director, Ken Draper, was inspired by the success of the Batman TV show, and asked Orkin to put together a two-and-a-half-minute comedy feature with a similarly "camp" sensibility.

In a 1996 article, Orkin explained, "I was never clear about what 'camp' meant, except that I guess it had something to do with the sacredness of absolute values that, when extended to irrational limits, became just plain silly... Thank God I hadn't known 'camp' was later considered a literary technique, or that would have killed the doing of it for me."

Orkin's Chickenman series was part of the late morning show hosted by Jim Runyon. Orkin played the male characters, including Benton Harbor and Police Commissioner Benjamin Norton. In a 1992 interview, Orkin admitted that Benton's character was "a little cardboardy," and refuted the rumors that Benton roughly resembles Orkin's own character: "This is, of course, nonsense. The resemblance is not even close to rough. It's precise."

The female characters on the show were performed by Jane Roberts, a Chicago theater actress who worked at WCFL as the traffic reporter. "She would listen to municipal traffic channels and coordinate the information for airing on WCFL," Orkin recalls. "She would put on a rather husky, sexy voice and play herself off as Trooper 36-24-36. Jane was the only 'female' talent I had available to me. And she was the best at what she did." Roberts' characters included the almost-unflappable Miss Helfinger, Chickenman's mother Mildred Harbor, his mother's oldest friend Emma Leckner, and Emma's attractive-and-still-single daughter Sadye.

Runyon performed the narration, including a closing tag for each episode that memorably began with an astonished "Well-l-l-l-l." According to Orkin, "Jim was incredible, he would adlib an ending for each episode. Jim made the work enjoyable and fun — because we never knew what he was going to come up with. His big goal was to break us up at the ending and make us laugh."

Chickenman's rogues gallery includes the Choker, the Hummer, the Chicken-Plucker, the Dog Lady, Big Clyde Crushman, the Bear Lady, the Very Diabolical [sic], Rodney Farber (a childhood playmate who never forgave Benton Harbor for breaking his red wagon one Christmas Day), and the Couple From SHTICK (Secret Henchmen To Injure Crime Killers). Benton Harbor is prone to spoonerisms, such as "I shall not rest while rime runs crampant in the streets of Midland City."

Chickenman roams Midland City seeking criminals in his yellow crime-fighting car, appropriately known as the Chicken Coupe. He has a secret headquarters, the Chicken Cave, accessible through a trap door in his bedroom closet. His armaments include the "geshtunkena ray gun", which is not lethal but makes the target "geshtunken" (drunk) for 24 hours. When Chickenman is busy, his mother Mildred fills in as "the Maternal Marauder", sometimes known as "the Masked Mother".

As the popularity of the show grew, Orkin created a production company: "I only intended the Chickenman series to run for a period of two weeks — but obviously it lasted much longer — it went on for four or five months. Suddenly, a syndication company from Texas came in and asked if they could distribute the program nationally. Naturally, we said "yes." It was then that we formed an actual company, at the station, to continue producing the series. Chickenman was produced under the station's production banner for the next five years, then I bought the show just prior to leaving WCFL in the early 1970s. I continued to produce and syndicate it on my own."

== Spinoff series ==
In 1967, during a break in the production of Chickenman, Orkin produced the series Amazon Ace, an action hero who was a cross between Tarzan and the Lone Ranger, accompanied by his faithful Indian companion Bernard. The series was produced under the name Camp Associates but also distributed by SPOT Productions which had distributed Chickenman.

In 1973, Orkin's production company revived the series as Chickenman vs. the Earth-Polluters, an ecology series in which the "Fearless Feathered Fighter" battles pollution in Midland City, organizing the BEAK (Beautiful Earth & Air Keepers) Patrol. A total of 52 episodes were recorded.

In 1977, Orkin produced Chickenman Returns for the Last Time Again. The "Wonderful White-Winged Warrior" feels that time had passed him by and he decides to open a crime-fighting school to carry on his crusade. However, there is only one student: Leon Cablemouth (played by Orkin's then-partner, Bert Berdis). Orkin and Rich Koz co-authored several of the episodes, which numbered 65.

In 1995, Orkin brought Chickenman out of retirement for a 30th anniversary tribute episode on Poultry Slam 1995, Episode 3 of the WBEZ public radio program This American Life (then called Your Radio Playhouse). In "Chickenman Challenges a Fate Named Frank," Benton Harbor realizes that he's getting older, and goes to the doctor, who tells him that his cholesterol is high and he should stop being a crime-fighting superhero. Chickenman goes to an employment agency, but all of the available jobs are even more physically strenuous than fighting crime, except for a napkin-folder in a nouveau Italian-Chinese restaurant. He tries a geriatric counselor, who recommends he move to a superhero retirement community. Faced with those disappointing options, Chickenman chances it all and challenges the fates. The story was repeated in the next year's Poultry Slam 1996, when This American Life was syndicated nationally.

== Rebroadcasts ==
Chickenman episodes are regularly played on the American Forces Radio and Television Service (AFRTS), especially on stations broadcasting to service personnel outside the continental United States. It first appeared on AFRTS during the Vietnam War.

In 1992, the Museum of Television & Radio (now The Paley Center for Media) acquired the complete collection of Chickenman episodes for their archive. A compilation of episodes is available for museum visitors to listen to.

== Releases ==
In 2001, Dick Orkin's Radio Ranch released Chickenman Can't Fly!, 100 episodes on four CDs.

In 2003, Radio Ranch released The Original, Complete & Unexpurgated Story of Chickenman, 273 episodes in a 14-CD set. The set includes the original 1966 episodes and the 1973 Chickenman vs the Earth Polluters series, along with station promos and two CDs of behind-the-scenes interviews with Orkin and sound engineer Mike King. (The CD set does not include the 65 episodes of the 1977 Chickenman Returns for the Last Time Again series.)

In 2009, Orkin's syndication company, the Chicago Radio Syndicate, partnered with BFM Digital to release the 273 episodes for digital download on iTunes and Amazon.

In 2017, Earwolf podcast network started reairing the episodes.

KBPI station in Denver is re-airing the episodes since Willie B, the DJ, purchased the rights to re-air the episodes. They air usually around 7:45-8am Mountain time. Can be heard on iHeart Radio.

== See also ==
- Super Chicken
