= Lisa Porché-Burke =

American psychologist and academic administrator (born 1954)

- Born: November 9, 1954 (age 71); Los Angeles, California, U.S.
- Occupations: Psychologist, educator, academic administrator
- Spouse: Peter Alston Burke
- Children: 3

Academic background
- Education: University of Southern California (BA); University of Notre Dame (MA, PhD)

Academic work
- Discipline: Psychology
- Sub-discipline: Counseling psychology, multicultural psychology
- Institutions: California School of Professional Psychology; Phillips Graduate Institute

Lisa Porché-Burke is an American psychologist, educator, and academic administrator. She served as chancellor of the Los Angeles campus of the California School of Professional Psychology and later as president and chief executive officer of Phillips Graduate Institute. Her work has focused on counseling psychology, multicultural psychology, higher education, and the training of mental health professionals. She has also held leadership positions in the American Psychological Association and other professional organizations.

== Early life and education ==
Lisa Porché-Burke was born on November 9, 1954, in Los Angeles. She was adopted and raised in a multicultural Creole family. She later said that experiences of racial discrimination influenced her interest in multicultural psychology.

Porché-Burke attended the University of Southern California (USC) where she earned her B.A. in psychology in 1976. She received her M.A. (1981) and Ph.D. (1983) in counseling psychology at the University of Notre Dame. She was the first Black woman to earn a doctorate in counseling psychology from Notre Dame.

== Career ==
Porché-Burke worked briefly at Boston City Hospital and Boston University School of Medicine, and then was appointed to the faculty at California School of Professional Psychology (CSPP) beginning in 1985. She was appointed Provost and later Chancellor of the Los Angeles campus of CSPP in 1991, where she focused on community mental health initiatives and multicultural training.

Porché-Burke became President and CEO of Phillips Graduate Institute (PGI) in 1999, where she remained until her departure in 2009. During her presidency, PGI added doctoral and organizational leadership programs and introduced curricula in leadership and human resources management. She resigned from PGI in 2009 during a dispute involving the institute’s accreditation by the Western Association of Schools and Colleges.

Porché-Burke held leadership positions in the American Psychological Association and the California Psychological Association and was involved in the National Multicultural Conference and Summit. She also worked on efforts to recruit and retain students and faculty of color in psychology programs.

Her awards include the Distinguished Contributions Recognition from APA Division 45 and the Jack Krasner Award from APA Division 29.

Porché-Burke has served on the boards of the People of America Foundation and Holy Family Services Adoption and Foster Care.

== Personal life ==
Porché-Burke is married to Peter Alston Burke, an attorney. She has three children.
