= Connie Szerszen =

American radio personality

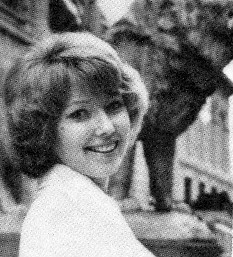
Szerszen in 1976.

Connie Szerszen is an American female radio personality. Szerszen is a native Chicagoan of Polish ancestry. While she was talent coordinator at WCFL, Szerszen was discovered by air personality Penny Lane, who called WCFL one day and soon talked Szerszen into auditioning as a disc jockey for WSDM-FM, "The Station With the Girls and All That Jazz--Smack Dab in the Middle". In October 1969, Szerszen started her broadcasting career at WSDM-FM. Her radio name was Den Pal Dawn where she featured "The Bachelor Boy Household Hint of the Day" and celebrity gossip between songs. She eventually did the morning show before leaving for WIND (AM).

On Christmas Day, 1971, Connie started DJing at WIND and did irregular shifts for the station. (Chicago Daily News, Norman Mark, April 12, 1972) In March 1974, Szerszen became America's first female rock jock to have her own PRIME TIME program on AM radio in a major market as announced in a WIND press release in March 1974. (Original press release is pictured in her memoir, Top Rock Girly Jock--A Chicago Radio First!) That was 6-10 p.m. as a D.J. on WIND in Chicago, a popular AM station then owned by Westinghouse Broadcasting, a/k/a Group W. Szerszen was entered into the U.S. Congressional Record for that achievement. The Chicago Sun-Times Midwest Magazine made her a cover story, crediting her as "The Woman Who Invented Strip Radio." WBBM-TV in Chicago did a feature story on her show for its 5 p.m. newscast with Bill Kurtis on May 7, 1976, and broadcast on Channel 2 News in Chicago=

Szerszen was also an on-air personality for several other Chicago stations, including WJMK, WJEZ, WJJD, and WUSN "US-99." On August 13, 2005, Connie was also the 1st woman in America to broadcast "live" on an all-digital radio station, WJMK 104.3 HD2. She appeared on local TV shows and guest-hosted WCIU-TV's Kiddie-A-Go-Go in October 1970.

When ABC7 was searching for a hostess for its daytime talk show, Program Manager Jeff McGrath interviewed Connie and viewed her guest appearance on the NBC show, Tilmon's Tempo, with weather forecaster/pilot Jim Tilmon. (Photo from NBC "Christmas Show" in Top Rock Girly Jock--A Chicago Radio First, p 204.) All went well, until he informed her at the end of the interview that they would also be talking to a woman from out of town named Oprah Winfrey. Connie lost out to Oprah.

On June 14, 2011, ABC7 featured Connie on Chicago Close-Up as a pioneering female DJ in the 4 p.m. news segment with Janet Davies. In December 2008, Steve Sanders interviewed Connie on the WGN-TV Mid Day News.

Her next book, COMFORTS—BLESSED ARE THEY.., was an inspirational work for those who are grieving and published in August 2016.

Connie Szerszen is known to her listeners as the Top Rock Girly Jock and Polish Princess and ends her shows with "Jeszcze Polska nie zginęła", the first line of the Polish national anthem.

In addition, Szerszen is a portrait artist. Szerszen's portraits of donors hang in the main entrance at St. Luke's Medical Center in Milwaukee, Wisconsin, and in the Karen Yontz Women's Cardiac Awareness Centers in Milwaukee and West Allis, Wisconsin. Her works also hang at The Oconomowoc Hospital's Cancer Center; St. Mary of Nazareth in Chicago; Inverness Golf Club; Holy Family Parish, Inverness, Illinois; and the Village Hall in Roselle, Illinois. She has also done works for private and corporate clients, such as USG Corporation. On October 19, 2003, THE DAILY HERALD did a full page cover story on Connie's art. In February 2006, Crain's Chicago Business did a feature story on her portraiture. In 2011, Paraclete Press requested permission to use her painting of Pope John Paul II on the cover of GOD WILL PROVIDE by Patricia Treece.

Szerszen has attended School of the Art Institute of Chicago, American Academy of Art, Northwestern University and The Palette & Chisel in Chicago with Dave Becker in October 2002,and The Studio of Long Grove with Romel de la Torre in 2003.
