= WKQX =

Alternative rock radio station in Chicago

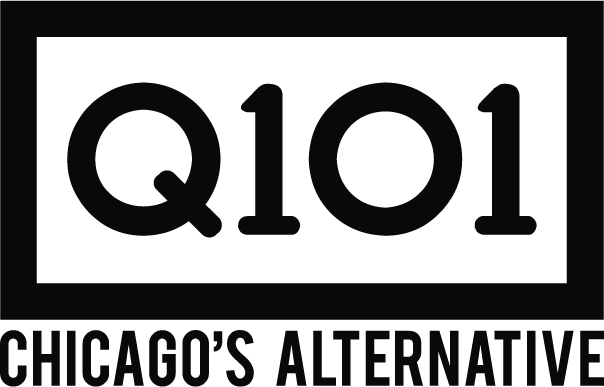
- Chicago, Illinois; United States
- Broadcast area: Chicago metropolitan area
- Frequency: 101.1 MHz (HD Radio)
- Branding: Q101

Programming
- Language: English
- Format: Alternative rock
- Subchannels: HD2: The Loop (classic rock)

Ownership
- Owner: Cumulus Media; (Radio License Holdings LLC)
- Sister stations: WLS; WLS-FM

History
- First air date: October 13, 1948
- Former call signs: WMAQ-FM (1948–74); WJOI (1974–75); WNIS-FM (1975–77); WKQX (1977–2011); WWWN (2011); WIQI (2011–14)
- Call sign meaning: Former FM sister to WMAQ, the callsign was first used for the station's "experimental" AOR format in the 1970s

Technical information
- Licensing authority: FCC
- Facility ID: 19525
- Class: B
- ERP: 5,700 watts
- HAAT: 425 meters (1,394 ft)
- Transmitter coordinates: 41°53′56.1″N 87°37′23.2″W

Links
- Public license information: Public file; LMS
- Webcast: Listen live; Listen live (HD2)
- Website: q101.com; wlup.com (HD2); Previous sites: https://web.archive.org/web/20120804071254/http://i101chicago.com fmnewschicago.com 101wkqx.com

WKQX (101.1 FM) is a commercial radio station licensed to Chicago, Illinois, featuring an alternative rock format known as "Q101". Owned by Cumulus Media, the station serves the Chicago metropolitan area. WKQX's studios are located in the NBC Tower, while the station transmits from atop the John Hancock Center. In addition to a standard analog transmission, WKQX broadcasts over two HD Radio channels.

WKQX is best known for carrying an alternative rock format that, from 1992 until 2011 and since 2022, has used the "Q101" brand. A sale of the station to Merlin Media in August 2011 saw outgoing owner Emmis Communications sell the "Q101 Chicago" name, intellectual property and all underlying trademarks for a unrelated internet radio station bearing the same name, while WKQX itself flipped to all-news radio under Merlin Media as WWWN, then to adult contemporary as WIQI. Reverting to alternative under a long-term local marketing agreement by Cumulus Media in 2014, the station branded instead under the restored WKQX call sign until Cumulus reacquired the Q101 trademarks on May 3, 2022. A former NBC Radio owned-and-operated station, WKQX's studios were located in the Merchandise Mart from the station's 1948 launch to 2016; the station relocated to the NBC Tower, the current home of onetime sister station WMAQ-TV, on August 4, 2016.

WKQX-HD2 airs a classic rock format branded as "The Loop" that was previously heard on the former WLUP (97.9 FM), now WCKL.

== History ==
=== The NBC years ===
NBC, which had an owned-and-operated station in Chicago since 1931 with WMAQ (670 AM), signed on WMAQ-FM on October 13, 1948, from studios in the Merchandise Mart. Its transmitter was located atop the Civic Opera Building, where it broadcast with an ERP of 24,000 watts. In its early years, WMAQ-FM generally operated as an outright simulcast of WMAQ.

The station began airing a classical music format afternoons and evenings in 1966, though it continued to simulcast WMAQ during mornings and early afternoons. By the early 1970s, it had adopted an easy listening format. In 1970, the station's transmitter was moved to the John Hancock Center.

In late 1972, WMAQ-FM adopted an automated adult hits format, with programming from TM Productions. In 1974, the station's call letters were changed to WJOI. In January 1975, WMAQ 670 adopted a country music format. WJOI followed suit, and aired an automated country music format aimed at a somewhat younger audience than WMAQ, with programming from TM Productions.

In June 1975, the station's call letters were changed to WNIS-FM, and it adopted an all news format carrying NBC Radio Network's News and Information Service (NIS).

In January 1977, the station's call sign was changed to WKQX, and it adopted an album-oriented rock (AOR) format. The program director was Bob Pittman, who later created MTV and is now CEO of iHeartMedia. Bob Heymann served as assistant program director and morning drive host, and Bob King was the music director. Mitch Michaels did afternoon drive and Lorna Ozmon did nights.

In the spring of 1977, Chicago gained another AOR station, WLUP, resulting in four FM rock stations (WKQX, WXRT, WDAI, and WLUP) competing against each other. In 1978, WKQX began "sponsoring" the Triad music magazine, which was formerly associated with free-form Chicago radio station WXFM. By January 1979, WDAI switched to an all-disco format and WKQX became an adult contemporary station; Joel Sebastian hosted mornings.

=== Q101 ===
In the early 1980s, WKQX began to be branded "Q-101". By the mid-1980s, the station had evolved into a hot AC format. During this period, the station carried Sexually Speaking with Dr. Ruth Westheimer and the Rick Dees Weekly Top 40.

From 1983 to 1993, Robert Murphy was the morning drive host on Q101. Tommy Edwards joined the station as program director in 1986. Starting in 1987, NBC began a two-year-long divestiture of their radio properties. In 1988, Emmis Communications purchased WKQX, along with four other NBC radio stations, for $121.5 million.

In the mid to late 1980s, WKQX aired an adult top 40 format, with the slogan "Today's Music". Q101 continued to evolve, and on July 14, 1992, WKQX adopted an alternative rock format as "Chicago's New Rock Alternative". Bill Gamble was the station's Program Director.

Q101 logo used for much of WKQX's existence as an alternative station

In July 1993, former MTV VJ Mark Goodman was hired as morning host, replacing Robert Murphy, but he remained in this position less than a year. In July 1998, Q101 became the new home of Mancow Muller's morning show after he left WRCX the previous month.

Specialty shows on the station, like Local 101, showcased promising local acts, many of whom went on to achieve greater prominence.

On April 1, 2005, WKQX went "on shuffle", with its playlist expanded from 200 to approximately 1,000 songs. Instead of focusing solely on new music, they expanded their playlist to include classic alternative rock from the 1980s and 1990s, and some 1970s artists. Mancow was dropped by the station on July 14, 2006, with Emmis Communications replacing his show with one that they felt would better appeal to their target demographic.

On September 18, 2006, Q101 launched The Morning Fix, a morning show led by former WXDX-FM Pittsburgh personality Alan Cox, and presented in a manner similar to The Daily Show, featuring a blend of current events and pop culture. However, on November 9, 2007, The Morning Fix underwent major changes when it was decided that morning airtime would be more wisely used playing music; the changes resulted in only 2 of the shows' original 6 members remaining, Alan Cox and Jim "Jesus" Lynam. On August 1, 2008, Cox and Lynam were let go, with management moving Brian Sherman and Steve Tingle from afternoons to the morning slot.

During its tenure as an alternative rock station, WKQX served as host to several music festivals and events, mainly Jamboree at Tweeter Center in Tinley Park every June, and Twisted (formerly Twisted Christmas) at various venues every December.

=== Purchase by Merlin Media ===
On June 21, 2011, Emmis announced that it would sell WKQX, sister station WLUP-FM, and WRXP-FM in New York City to Merlin Media, whose CEO was former Tribune Company and Clear Channel Communications executive Randy Michaels. Emmis, who retained a minority stake in Merlin Media, granted Merlin a local marketing agreement to operate WKQX and WLUP-FM from July 15 until the sale officially closed on September 1. A format flip for WKQX, from alternative rock to all-news, was rumored after the sale was announced. Michaels was on record as saying, "My favorite format has always been spoken radio... it's time for spoken word to move to FM."

The entire airstaff at Q101 was dismissed upon Merlin Media's formal takeover that July 14. That same day, Emmis sold off the "Q101" name, related intellectual properties, and the Q101.com web domain, to Broadcast Barter Radio Networks.

Q101's final on-air staffed show, "Local 101", concluded at approximately 1:01 a.m. on July 15; the program ended with "Tonight, Tonight" by Chicago-based The Smashing Pumpkins, The Cure's "Friday I'm in Love" (the first song played at Q101's 1992 inception as an alternative station), and formal goodbyes by Chris Payne, Pogo, and other Q101 staffers. Q101 would continue solely as an online stream programmed, in part, by Emmis' KROX-FM, before BBRN eventually relaunched it as an internet-only station. WKQX itself continued without on-air staffing until Midnight on July 19; after playing "Closing Time" by Semisonic, WKQX began stunting with adult contemporary music along with news reports as "FM New". Robert Murphy returned to the station after 19 years to host mornings along with Lise Dominique for a few weeks until the full format switch took place.

=== FM News 101.1 ===
The "FM News 101.1" logo (2011–2012; a similar logo was used for the FM New branding before the format officially became news)

On July 21, 2011, WKQX changed its call letters to WWWN, a call sign moved from a silent signal in Watseka, Illinois licensed to Randy Michaels' Radioactive LLC. Eight days after the call letter change, on July 29, at 4 pm, WWWN launched an all-news format branded as "FM News 101.1".

At the outset, "FM News 101.1" sought to differentiate itself from WBBM by highlighting its round-the-clock newswheel (as opposed to Chicago Bears flagship WBBM), aiming for a looser, less formal news presentation with a conversational tone, and deviating from hard news in favor of lifestyle, health and entertainment features. The initial on-air and newsroom staff at "FM News 101.1" included several with Chicago radio ties, including Debra Dale and Jennifer O'Neill (both WBBM alumna), Brant Miller and Monica DeSantis (WLS alums), and Ed Curran and Rob Hart (WGN alums). The station's call letters were changed again in December 2011 to WIQI.

"FM News 101.1" was criticized in its early weeks for what was seen as an amateurish, unpolished, and unprepared presentation. Moreover, Merlin's top management (including Michaels) admitted that the format for both stations were still a work in progress, and "FM News" underwent a continual series of format adjustments. These included: the addition of sports and business updates; the "informal" testing of a news partnership with WMAQ-TV; and the addition of daily commentary segments from Clark Howard and Lionel. Later staff changes and reassignments at the station would lead to an increased reliance on "shared anchor arrangements" with its New York counterpart WEMP, as well as a non-linear, voicetracking-style of arranging reports, sometimes without any anchor transitions. WIQI also began an advertising campaign that included a controversial series of billboards using the face of imprisoned former Illinois Governor Rod Blagojevich and the "He Never Listens... to FM News 101.1" tagline.

By June 2012, WIQI began phasing in blocks of "Expanded News Coverage" where the station entered a programming approach similar to talk radio. Personalities such as Mancow Muller, Neil Steinberg, Kevin Matthews, Mike North and Dan Jiggets and former WGN morning host Greg Jarrett all hosted informal auditions under the "Expanded News Coverage" banner. Jarrett himself was promoted to host morning drive on WIQI during the formats' final three weeks of existence.

In spite of constant format tweaks and alterations, the all-news format failed to achieve better than a 0.4 Arbitron ratings share. "FM News" was outperformed by the final ratings book for "Q101" and WKQX-LP, the aural signal of a low-power analog television station operated by Merlin under a local marketing agreement with an alternative rock format dubbed "Q87.7".

=== i101 ===
At 9 a.m. (CT) on July 17, 2012, with both WIQI and WEMP languishing on the eve of their one-year anniversaries, "FM News" was abruptly dropped on both stations. WIQI flipped to a 1990s-centric adult hits format targeted at females between the ages of 18 and 49, and was branded as "i101". The first song on "i101" was Bye Bye Bye by NSYNC. With a few exceptions, most of the WIQI and WEMP news staffs were immediately dismissed, with subsequent layoffs occurring in the following weeks and months.

After one month on the air, "i101" would move towards a hot adult contemporary approach. "i101" included some limited use of on-air staff, including morning host and former WLUP-FM staffer Jane Monzures, who shared morning duties with fellow "Loop" alum Pete McMurray between August and October 2012. In late 2013, the station shifted to a rhythmic adult contemporary format.

=== 101 WKQX ===
Logo used after WKQX reverted to alternative rock, based on the Flag of Chicago. As the "Q101" name and intellectual property were used at the time by an unrelated webcaster, the station branded under their call letters.

On January 3, 2014, Merlin Media announced a local marketing agreement (LMA) with Cumulus Media that would see Cumulus take over operations of WIQI, WLUP and WKQX-LP. The deal, which includes an option for Cumulus to purchase WIQI and WLUP, resulted in Merlin relinquishing operations of its last remaining radio stations, and also saw an expansion of Cumulus' Chicago cluster, which includes WLS and WLS-FM. Cumulus executives indicated that they, at the time of rebranding, had no intentions of acquiring back the online rendition of "Q101" and related intellectual properties from the stations' 1992-2011 era.

In announcing the LMA, Cumulus indicated that it would move the alternative rock format from WKQX-LP onto the 101.1 facility. The move took place on January 10, 2014, when the stations began a transitional simulcast. "Closing Time" by Semisonic was the last song played on "i101", while the first song played on the 101.1/87.7 simulcast was "Times Like These" by Foo Fighters. The simulcast ended February 17, 2014, when Merlin Media's LMA for 87.7 ended and Tribune Broadcasting began a local marketing agreement for the station (which is now WRME-LD). The WKQX call sign was restored on the 101.1 facility on January 17.

101 WKQX's airstaff initially included Brian Phillips, Lou Lombardo, Lauren O'Neil, PJ Kling, and "wALT" (Walter Flakus of Stabbing Westward). In September 2015, Portland radio personality Marconi joined WKQX to host weeknights (replacing PJ Kling). Marconi left WKQX in January 2018. Brian Sherman, former on-air personality at Q101 from 2001 to 2011, and one half of the duo Sherman and Tingle, was hired as an on-air personality for weekends. Sherman retained his weekday on air role at suburban classic rocker WFXF. Russell Tanzillo from North Central College's WONC joined as a weekend host in September 2015. In April 2016, the station hired James VanOsdol, another former Q101 personality, to host a new local music showcase titled "Demo 312" (in reference to Chicago's well-known main area code).

Logo for WKQX-HD2, "The Loop"

In November 2015, WKQX and WLUP announced their move from the Merchandise Mart, where the 101.1 frequency has been broadcast from since first taking the airwaves in 1948, in favor of a new studio at the NBC Tower. Until the new facility was completed, WKQX broadcast from a temporary facility at 190 N. State. On August 4, 2016, the move of WKQX and WLUP to the NBC Tower was finalized.

In January 2018, as part of Cumulus Media's bankruptcy proceedings, the company requested that a U.S. Bankruptcy Court release the company from several "extremely unprofitable" contracts, including its LMAs with WLUP and WKQX. Cumulus stated that under the agreement, which carries a monthly fee of $600,000, the company had lost $8.4 million on the two Merlin stations. WLUP was sold by Merlin to the Educational Media Foundation. On April 3, 2018, it was announced that Cumulus would acquire WKQX and the intellectual property of WLUP for $18 million. The sale to Cumulus was consummated on June 15, 2018. The Loop's classic rock format moved to WKQX-HD2. 101.1 HD2 previously aired a smooth jazz format.

=== Returning to Q101 ===
On April 18, 2022, Cumulus Media announced their purchase of Q101 Chicago from Broadcast Barter Radio Networks, as well as the Q101.com domain name, all underlying trademarks and related intellectual property that Emmis had divested in 2011. Cumulus Chicago Vice President/Market Manager Marv Nyren revealed to Daily Herald journalist Robert Feder that discussions had been ongoing for over four years to reacquire rights to the "Q101" brand. The internet station ceased operations, while WKQX reverted to "Q101" during the station's "10th anniversary" concert on May 3, 2022 (celebrating the launch of the current iteration of the format over the former WKQX-LP).
