= Dave Fogel =

American classic hits radio disc jockey

Dave Fogel (born October 2) is an American classic hits radio disc jockey. He has worked in Chicago, Detroit, Washington D.C., San Diego and Kansas City. The bulk of his radio work has been in Chicago, and he is the current morning show host on 94.7 WLS-FM.

== Early life ==
Fogel was born in Rochester, New York, the son of actor, DJ and talk radio host Jerry Fogel. At the age of six, he moved to Hollywood, California when his father started working on the TV series The Mothers-in-Law.

Fogel attended Granada Hills High School in suburban Los Angeles, where he played on the football team with Super Bowl MVP John Elway.

In order to live a more "normal" life, Fogel's father moved the family to Kansas City, where Fogel attended the University of Missouri-Columbia. There, he was a member of the Sigma Chi fraternity, living in the house with Brad Pitt.

While in college, Fogel got into the radio business, first at KJMO-FM in Jefferson City, MO as overnight DJ, and then at KCMQ-FM (Columbia, Missouri) as the night DJ.

== Radio career ==
After earning a Bachelor of Arts degree, Fogel worked for the night show at KJLA-AM, an all-disco station in Kansas City, Missouri. He then worked as the overnight DJ for KBEQ-FM (Kansas City).

In 1985, Fogel moved KSDO-FM in San Diego for three years of night disc-jockey work. His next stop was WAVA-FM in Washington, DC, also for the night show. He was hired away in 1989 as the afternoon drive DJ for WHYT-FM Detroit, Michigan, where he spent seven very successful years. He also started his family.

Fogel moved to Chicago in 1996, replacing former child star Danny Bonaduce on WLUP-FM. He then moved to WTMX-FM, where he spent almost eight years as a top rated afternoon personality on 101.9 The Mix.

After his contract expired in 2004, Fogel headed back to Kansas City to KMXV-FM as midday host before eventually moving to morning drive at sister station KCKC-FM. He was on the morning show there for three years before returning to Chicago to host mornings at WLS-FM in 2010, replacing former morning man (and current WMAQ TV weatherman) Brant Miller. Fogel was morning host at WLS for nearly three years before being replaced by the man he displaced, Brant Miller.

Fogel was immediately picked up by WJMK-FM in Chicago, where he eventually moved into the morning slot, superseding longtime market veterans Eddie and Jobo.

After five years at "K-Hits", CBS Radio sold the station and the format flipped to hip-hop. Fogel was released in November 2017 and was quickly signed by WLS-FM once again. For the second time, Fogel would replace Brant Miller at WLS-FM.

In March of 2018, Fogel began doing the midday show on KCMO-FM in Kansas City. This is a sister station of WLS-AM/FM, and he does the show from their studios in Chicago.

== Personal life ==
In February 2017, Fogel revealed to his radio audience that he had been diagnosed with prostate cancer. He missed just one day of work on the air (surgery day), as he did his morning show broadcast from his home for the next three weeks. He said that the PSA blood test saved his life, and has emphasized awareness since his diagnosis. Later tests revealed that the surgery was not a complete success, and radiation treatments became necessary.

Fogel has been married to his college sweetheart, Melanie, since August of 1985. They have two children.
