= Zakk Tyler =

American broadcaster

Zakk Tyler or Zakk (born Dominic Joseph Zaccagnini) is an American multi-media manager, sports, news and talk show personality.

== Radio career ==
Upon graduation from Indiana University of Pennsylvania (1990) he began his career in Pittsburgh, Pennsylvania (WRRK) and later in Louisville, Kentucky (WTFX-FM), Memphis, Tennessee (WMFS) and then in Greenville, South Carolina (WTPT) as both the station program director and morning show host.

The show moved to San Francisco to rock radio network (KSJO) that was broadcast to San Jose-Monterey-Contra Costa, California and distributed to company owned stations in Nashville, Tennessee and Greenville.

In Chicago the show aired afternoon drive on WLUP. Zakk hosted NFL Chicago Bears pregame show and was frequent guest on sports television show Sports Page.

The Zakk Tyler Show aired morning drivetime at WZGC (also known as "Dave-FM") in Atlanta, where Zakk was pregame and postgame host for Atlanta Falcons which aired on over 30 stations throughout the Southeast and Midwest.

Zakk (Dominic Zaccagnini) hosted a nationally syndicated sports show with former NFL quarterback Jack Trudeau (Zakk and Jack) weekday mornings from 2010 to 2012 that was carried throughout the Fox Sports Radio Network.

In 2012, Zakk returned to WLUP in Chicago as an on-air personality and sports director for Merlin Media who would later sell the radio station to Cumulus Media who promoted Zakk to Program Director, Afternoon Drive at KSAN in San Francisco postgame host for San Francisco 49ers and pregame host for Kansas City Chiefs on KCFX-FM

Joining iHeartRadio in 2022 and following a short stint as Program Director, News, Sports and Personality at WHAM-AM, WAIO-FM and WSYR-AM, Zakk was transferred by the company to Dallas-Fort Worth as Program Director and Personality for KEGL-Dallas Radio Home of Dallas Mavericks and KZPS

== Albums ==
Caught Between Heaven & Hell (1999) of bits, parodies and segments from the Zakk Tyler Show and full length debate between Sharon Osbourne and a local, Christian minister who was attempting to ban Black Sabbath from performing at the local BI-LO Center (later renamed as Bon Secours Wellness Arena). The debate was hosted by Zakk and co-host Kimberly and was filmed by Penelope Spheeris to be later included in the Black Sabbath 2001 documentary film We Sold Our Souls for Rock 'n Roll. The double-length compact disc collection reached Number 1 on the album charts where it was locally sold in the Upstate of South Carolina.

Naughty Lizards & Songs with Bongs (2000) of bits, parodies and segments from the Zakk Tyler Show. It was a downloadable disc made available at Zakkster.com which parodied Napster.com

== Acting ==
Zakk appeared as himself in the Black Sabbath documentary '"We Sold Our Souls for Rock 'n Roll" (2001).

Zakk was a consultant for episode 204 of the VH-1 sitcom Free Radio (2009) as storylines were based on his past radio experiences.

== Current roles ==
Retired from broadcast media since 2025, Zakk is certified by the Motorcycle Safety Foundation for Harley-Davidson Riding Academy and GoMoto Training.

== Radio awards ==
- 2004 Best Rock Radio Personality (Radio & Records)
- 2000, 1998, 1997 Best Local Radio Personality (Creative Loafing Magazine)
- 2003 Top 10 Radio Stunts of Year (Radio & Records Magazine)
- 1997 Program Director of the Year, runner-up (Billboard Magazine)
- 1997 Program Director of the Year for Active Rock, runner-up (FMQB Magazine)

== Other notable recognition ==
- 2013 Top 50 Singles in Chicago (Today's Chicago Woman Magazine)
