= Donna Hilbert =

American writer (born 1946)

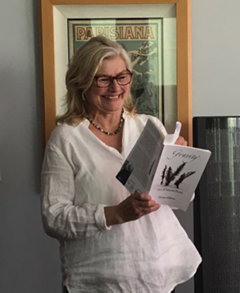
- Born: June 25, 1946 (age 80); Grandfield, Oklahoma
- Occupation: Author
- Writing career
- Genres: Poetry, short story, non-fiction, theater
- Notable works: Women Who Make Money and the Men Who Love Them (1994)
- Notable awards: Staple First Editions
- Website: donnahilbert.com

Donna Hilbert (born June 25, 1946) is an American poet who also writes short stories, plays, and essays. She was a founding member of the Progressive Dinner Party in Long Beach, California, and she is also known for her commitment to progressive politics and community arts programs.

== Life ==
Hilbert was born in 1946 in Grandfield, Oklahoma, a small town near the Texas border south of Deep Red Creek and north of the Red River. Her family was Methodist. At the age of seven, she moved with her parents to the San Fernando Valley of Southern California, first in Van Nuys, then Reseda, and finally in Northridge. At the age of eighteen, she married into an upper middle class Catholic family. Hilbert and her husband raised three sons. In the summer of 1998, her husband was killed on his early-morning bicycle ride by a motorist driving home from a methadone clinic. She has lived in Long Beach, California since 1998.

== Career ==
Hilbert did not begin writing until after her father's death. By that time, she had thoroughly committed herself to the domestic heavy-lifting of many women in her generation, putting obligations as wife and mother before her own education or career. But Hilbert had long fostered an emerging ambition of her own by studying such diverse writers as Albert Camus, Sigmund Freud, Graham Greene, Omar Kayam, and Grace Metalious. She eventually completed an undergraduate degree in political science from California State University, Long Beach (in 1978), as well as a graduate degree in psychotherapy from the California Family Study Center (in 1987).

In 1980, Hilbert began publishing poems in literary journals, and an editor at Event Horizon Press noticed her work, launching her debut collection, Mansions, in 1990. Her subsequent books include a fiction collection, Women Who Make Money and the Men Who Love Them (1994), which won the Staple First Editions prize in England, and six other books of poetry: Deep Red (1993), Feathers and Dust (1996), Transforming Matter (2000), Greatest Hits (2001), Traveler in Paradise: New and Selected Poems (2004), and Gravity: New & Selected Poems (2018). Hilbert's writing is not easily slotted into a single tradition; she experiments with free-verse lyricism, formalism, and prose poetry. In more recent work, one can find elements of sardonic allegory, even surrealism.

Long Beach poet and fiction writer Gerald Locklin authored Two Novellas in collaboration with Hilbert and has since shared the lectern with her many times at readings in the U.S. and United Kingdom. He describes Hilbert's writing as “musical,” “imagistic,” and “much more poetic than most contemporary poetry without lapsing into the ‘pseudo-poetic’ or trite.” He also stresses that the trajectory of Hilbert’s career outside the traditional academy has been an unquestionable asset to her development as a writer: “She probably has more in common with the unselfconscious women writers of earlier generations than the more professionally or commercially driven women of our MFA generation.”

In the past three years, Hilbert has experimented in other genres, including nonfiction, playwriting, and the novel. For PEN USA, she taught workshops for Emerging Voices poetry fellows.

Hilbert's life and work since the tragic loss of her husband have become the subjects of an independent biopic, Grief Becomes Me: A Poet's Journey, produced and directed by award-winning filmmaker Christine Fugate. The first installment of the film premiered at the annual Kentucky Women Writers Conference in 2004.

== Bibliography ==
- Beals, Ellen Wade, ed. Solace in So Many Words. Weighed Words, 2011.
- Blackman, Roy, and Michael Laskey, eds. Aldeburgh Poetry Festival Anthology, 1989-1998. Aldeburgh Poetry Trust, 1999.
- Claman, Elizabeth, ed. Writing Our Way Out of The Dark. Minneapolis, Minnesota: Queen of Swords Press, 1995.
- Coggin, Linda, and Clare Marlow, eds. Everybody's Mother. Cornwall: Peterloo Poets, 2001.
- Cole-Dai, Phyllis, and Ruby R. Wilson, eds. Poetry of Presence: An Anthology of Mindfulness Poems. West Hartford, Connecticut: Grayson Books, 2017.
- Fisk, Molly, ed. California Fire & Water: An Anthology of Poems. 2020.
- Gemin, Pamela, and Paula Sergi, eds. Boomer Girls: Poems by Women from the Baby Boom Generation. Iowa City, Iowa: University of Iowa Press, 1999.
- Gray, Jeffrey, et al. The Greenwood Encyclopedia of American Poets and Poetry. Westport, Connecticut: Greenwood Publishing Group, 2005.
- Hilbert, Donna. Deep Red. Desert Hot Springs: Event Horizon Press, 1993.
- Hilbert, Donna. Gravity: New & Selected Poems. Huntington Beach, California: Tebot Bach, 2018.
- Hilbert, Donna. Greatest Hits. Johnstown, Ohio: Pudding House Publications, 2001.
- Hilbert, Donna. "Iowa by the Sea." The Los Angeles Times. 19 February 2004. Print edition: F7.
- Hilbert, Donna. The Green Season. Huntington Beach, California: World Parade Books, 2009.
- Hilbert, Donna. Threnody. Whittier, California: Moon Tide Press, 2021.
- Hilbert, Donna. Transforming Matter. Long Beach, California: Pearl Editions, 2000.
- Hilbert, Donna. Traveler in Paradise: New and Selected Poems. Long Beach, California: Pearl Editions, 2004.
- Hilbert, Donna. Women Who Make Money and the Men Who Love Them. Derbyshire: Staple First Editions, 1994.
- Lapidus, Jacqueline, and Lise Menn, eds. The Widow's Handbook: Poetic Reflections on Grief and Survival. Kent, Ohio: The Kent State University Press, 2014.
- Masek, Alys, and Kelly Mayhew, eds. Mamas and Papas On the Sublime and Heartbreaking Art of Parenting. San Diego, California: Sunbelt Publications, 2010.
- Mcgovern, Robert, and Stephen Haven, eds. And What Rough Beast: Poems at the End of the Century. Ashland, Ohio: Ashland Poetry Press, 1999.
- Measham, Donald, and Bob Windsor, eds. Twenty Years of Twentieth Century Poetry. Staple, 2001.
- Schafer, Janette, et al., eds. Is It Hot In Here Or Is It Just Me?: Women Over Forty Write on Aging. 2019.
- Scott-Coe, Jo. "An Interview with Donna Hilbert." The Chiron Review, Issue 84, Autumn 2008: 3–5.
- "Starting Something Big: Chicks with Checks." O Magazine January 2006.
- Stetler, Charles, et al., eds. A New Geography of Poets. Fayetteville, Arkansas: University of Arkansas Press, 1992.
- Wizansky, Margot, ed. Mercy of Tides: Poems for a Beach House. Dartmouth, Massachusetts: Salt Marsh Pottery Press, 2003.
