= Dick Orkin =

American actor (1933–2017)

- Born: Richard Alan Orkin; July 9, 1933; Williamsport, Pennsylvania, U.S.
- Died: December 24, 2017 (aged 84); Thousand Oaks, California, U.S.
- Education: Franklin and Marshall College (BA); Phillips Graduate University (MS); Yale University (MFA)
- Spouses: Blanche "Bunny" Grosky (m. 1954; died 2007); Diane Lantz (m. 2009)
- Children: 4

Richard Alan Orkin (July 9, 1933 – December 24, 2017) was an American voice actor and commercial radio producer who created the Chickenman radio series and The Secret Adventures of the Tooth Fairy. His voice was used in many radio advertisements and public-service announcements.

== Early life and education ==
Born in Williamsport, Pennsylvania, Orkin received his Bachelor of Arts degree in speech and theater from Franklin & Marshall College in 1956. He received a master's degree in clinical psychology from the Phillips Graduate Institute, and attended Yale Drama School, studying for a Master of Fine Arts degree in theater.

== Career ==
After graduating from Yale Drama School in 1958, Orkin was hired as the news director at radio station WLAN in Lancaster, Pennsylvania. Later he worked at KYW in Cleveland, and from there he was recruited to come to Chicago and work in radio advertising for WCFL in 1963. He gained acclaim with his comedy radio commercials (until 1982 in collaboration with Bert Berdis) for Time magazine, GMAC, the Gap and other clients. His radio spots, mini dramas dubbed by Newsweek as "The Advertising Theater of the Absurd", won many awards.

Orkin and Christine Coyle co-wrote two animated specials for CBS, Christmas Every Day and The Canterville Ghost. Orkin and Coyle are the founders of Radio Ranch, the radio production company that was originally known as Dick Orkin's Radio Ranch and Home for Wayward Cowboys.

Orkin's best-known radio series, Chickenman, was produced at Chicago station WCFL from 1966 to 1969. 217 episodes were produced.

In 1967, during a break in the production of Chickenman, Orkin produced Amazon Ace, an adventure serial that was described as a cross between Tarzan and the Lone Ranger; Ace was accompanied by his faithful Indian companion Bernard.

In 1971, Orkin produced The Secret Adventures of the Tooth Fairy, starring Orkin as Newton Snookers, a dental assistant who claimed to be the Tooth Fairy. 325 episodes were produced.

Orkin returned to Chickenman in 1973 for a weekend series with an environmental theme: Chickenman vs. the Earth Polluters. The serial was designed to air on Saturdays and Sundays, on stations that were playing the original Chickenman series on Mondays through Fridays. 56 episodes were produced.

In 1976, Orkin produced a Colonial-era comedy serial called The Masked Minuteman, starring Orkin as a similarly hapless hero involved with Revolutionary-era historical figures. The show aired as part of The Great American Birthday Party, a Bicentennial-themed series airing on WGN in Chicago. 65 episodes were produced.

Orkin also produced an LP in 1976 called Chickenman Returns, and a follow-up series in 1977, Chickenman Returns for the Last Time Again. 65 episodes were produced.

== Personal life and death ==
Orkin married Blanche "Bunny" Grosky, and together they had four children. After Bunny's death in 2007, Orkin married Diane Lantz. He moved from Chicago to Southern California in the late 1970s, and lived there for the rest of his life.

Orkin died of a hemorrhagic stroke in Thousand Oaks, California, at the age of 84.

== Honors and awards ==
Orkin was inducted into the National Radio Hall of Fame, the NAB Broadcasting Hall of Fame, the Illinois Broadcasters Hall of Fame, the Pennsylvania Broadcasters Hall of Fame and the Radio Advertising Bureau Hall of Fame.

On January 21, 2010, Orkin wrote to the National Association of Broadcasters, requesting them to remove his name from the Hall of Fame, because he did not wish to share the honor with radio talk show host Rush Limbaugh. According to Orkin, Limbaugh showed "reckless insensitivity" with his remarks regarding the 2010 Haiti earthquake. Orkin referred to Limbaugh as a "dangerous hate-monger" and a "perfidious human being".
