= WIND (AM) =

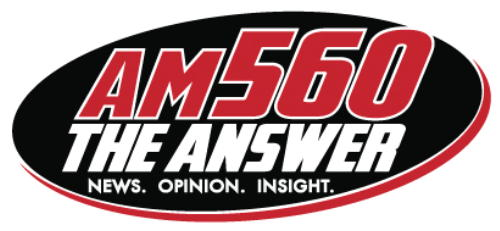
- Chicago, Illinois; United States
- Broadcast area: Chicago metropolitan area
- Frequency: 560 kHz
- Branding: AM 560 The Answer

Programming
- Format: Conservative talk radio
- Affiliations: Fox News Radio; Premiere Networks; Salem Radio Network; Townhall; Northern Illinois Huskies (NCAA Division I)

Ownership
- Owner: Salem Media Group; (Salem Media of Illinois, LLC)
- Sister stations: WYLL

History
- First air date: August 16, 1927
- Former call signs: WJKS (1927–1933)
- Call sign meaning: Indiana (originally licensed to Gary, Indiana); The Windy City

Technical information
- Licensing authority: FCC
- Facility ID: 67068
- Class: B
- Power: 5,000 watts
- Transmitter coordinates: 41°33′54.13″N 87°25′11.14″W

Links
- Public license information: Public file; LMS
- Webcast: Listen live
- Website: 560theanswer.com

WIND (560 kHz) is a commercial radio station licensed to Chicago, Illinois, and broadcasting a conservative talk radio format. It is owned by the Salem Media Group with studios on NW Point Boulevard in Elk Grove Village.

WIND transmits with 5,000 watts, using a directional antenna with a four-tower array, in Griffith, Indiana. Due to its location near the bottom of the AM dial, transmitter power, and the surrounding region's flat land, WIND's daytime signal covers much of Northeast Illinois, Northwest Indiana and Southeastern Wisconsin. Its nighttime pattern concentrates its signal in the Chicago and Milwaukee areas.

== Programming ==
WIND carries the Salem Radio Network line up of hosts, including Hugh Hewitt, Mike Gallagher, Chris Stigall, Larry Elder, Alex Marlow and Scott Jennings. From Premiere Networks, WIND also carries The Sean Hannity Show. WIND airs two local shows on weekdays, Chicago's Morning Answer with Dan Proft, and Shaun Thompson in afternoons. Most hours begin with an update from Townhall News.

Much of the weekend is devoted to specialty talk shows on money, health and real estate, some of which is paid brokered programming. WIND is the flagship station for Carl Amari and Lisa Wolf's nationally syndicated nostalgia & showbiz program "Hollywood 360" which airs Saturday evenings. Northern Illinois Huskies football games air in the fall.

== History ==
=== Early history ===
The station began broadcasting on August 16, 1927. Its original call sign was WJKS, and its original city of license was Gary, Indiana. It initially operated at 1290 kHz, and shared time with WSBC. Its studio and transmitter were located in the Gay Mill Ballroom, in Gary's Miller Beach neighborhood. The station was owned by the ballroom's owners, Thomas Johnson and Frances Kennedy. In 1928, its frequency was changed to 1360 kHz, where it shared time with WGES. Ralph Atlass purchased a 50% stake in the station in 1931. In 1932, WJKS's studios were moved to the Gary State Bank Building.

The station moved to its present 560 kHz frequency in 1933, after Chicago stations WIBO and WPCC, which had been operating at 560 kHz, were shut down. The station began full-time operations, and ran 1,000 watts. Its call sign was changed to WIND the same year. In 1934, the station's daytime power was increased to 2,500 watts and in 1935 its daytime power was increased to 5,000 watts. Its nighttime power was increased to 5,000 watts in 1941.

From the 1930s until 1985, WIND played "The Whiffenpoof Song" every night at 2 am.

In the fall of 1937, the station was one of several Chicago radio stations to donate airtime to Chicago Public Schools for a pioneering program in which the school district provided elementary school students with distance education amid a polio outbreak-related school closure.

In 1944, WIND's studios were moved to Chicago's Carbide & Carbon Building, and in 1947 its studios were moved to the South tower of the Wrigley Building.

In 1946, Ralph Atlass sold his stake in WIND to newspaper publisher John S. Knight for $800,000. Atlass remained station manager of WIND.

=== Popular music era ===
Eddie Hubbard began hosting a popular music program called the ABC Club in 1945. By the late 1940s, much of the station's schedule was devoted to contemporary music. WIND was Chicago's leading hit music station in the 1950s.

Howard Miller was WIND's program director from 1945 to 1949. In 1950, Miller started a longtime run as Chicago's top rated morning DJ. Miller would remain Chicago's top rated radio personality until leaving the station in 1968. Other WIND personalities during its music years included Jim Lounsbury, Linn Burton, Jay Trompeter, Bernie Allen, Lee Rogers, Dick Williamson, Perry Marshall, Bruce Lee, Kassidy, Joel Sebastian, Robert W. Morgan, Chuck Benson and Kurt Russell, Ron Britain, Bob Del Giorno, and Connie Szerszen.

From 1945 to 1957, WIND held the exclusive local rights to broadcast Chicago Cubs baseball. Sportscasters on WIND during this period included Bert Wilson, Milo Hamilton, and Jack Quinlan.

In 1956, the station was sold to Westinghouse Broadcasting for $5.3 million, which at the time was a record amount for a radio station. At the time of the purchase, WIND had no news department, though the station subscribed to wire services. Westinghouse established a news department at the station, and it aired 5-minute newscasts every hour. Earl Finckle was the station's meteorologist for a period.

In the 1960s, WIND shifted to a middle of the road, pop contemporary/pop standards format. In 1967, the station began adding some harder tracks to its playlist. Phil Nolan became general manager of WIND in 1969.

In 1971, WIND evolved into an oldies-heavy adult contemporary format, playing hits from 1955 to present day. In addition to the music played on the station, WIND aired Contact, a nighttime talk show hosted by Dave Baum. Larry "The Legend" Johnson hosted overnights. Ed Schwartz served as a substitute host for Johnson, before replacing him as overnight host in 1973. Schwartz had previously held several behind-the-scenes positions at WIND. Schwartz continued as overnight host on WIND until 1981, when he moved to 720 WGN.

In 1973, WIND won the George Foster Peabody Award for their series "From 18th Street: Destination Peking".

=== First talk era ===
In September 1978, WIND switched to a news/talk format. Local personalities included Clark Weber, Eddie Schwartz, Dave Baum, Steve King, and Jimmy Piersall. Syndicated personalities heard on WIND included British-American talk show host Michael Jackson and Dr. Toni Grant. The Larry King Show was heard overnight.

=== Spanish era ===
In 1985, Westinghouse announced that they would sell WIND to Tichenor Radio for $6.85 million. On December 12, 1985, at 1:03 pm, on the same day of the closing of the sale to Tichenor, WIND officially signed off the air by playing "The Whiffenpoof Song" and "The Star-Spangled Banner". Soon thereafter, WIND signed back on the air, with a Spanish language format. The station aired Mexican mariachi and ranchera music and was branded "La Tremenda". By the late 1990s, the station was airing a Spanish talk/romantica format. In 1997, Tichenor Media merged with Heftel Broadcasting to form the Hispanic Broadcasting Corporation, which merged with Univision Communications in 2004. In October 2003, the station's talk programming moved to AM 1200 WRTO, and it began airing a Spanish adult contemporary format.

=== Second talk era ===
In 2004, Univision Radio announced a multi-station swap with Salem Communications. This resulted in Salem acquiring WIND, while Univision Radio received 106.7 WZFS (now WPPN).

On November 1, 2004, WIND once again became an English-language talk station. Its original line-up included Bill Bennett, Laura Ingraham, Dennis Prager, Michael Medved, Michael Savage, Hugh Hewitt, and Mike Gallagher.

In July 2005, WIND entered into an agreement with the University of Illinois to carry Fighting Illini football and men's basketball games, as well as the coaches shows, through the Illini Sports Radio Network. Those broadcasts continued through the 2013 football season, with the Illini moving back to their longtime Chicago affiliate, WSCR. WIND was formerly the alternate station of the Chicago Blackhawks and the Northwestern Wildcats in the case of scheduling conflicts at their flagship, WGN.

On January 21, 2013, WIND rebranded as AM 560 The Answer, to follow suit with other Salem Communications-owned stations.

In 2014, WIND became the Chicago radio home for Northern Illinois Huskies football. "Beyond The Beltway" with Bruce DuMont was heard on Sunday evenings until January 19, 2025.
