= Clark Weber =

Radio Personality

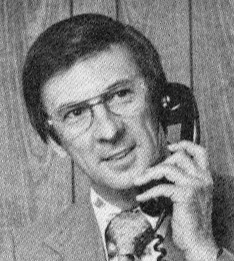
Weber at WIND Radio, 1976.

Clarence Henry "Clark" Weber (Born November 24, 1930, in Wauwatosa, Wisconsin died March 7, 2020) was an American radio personality in Chicago, Illinois. He also ran his own radio advertising consultancy, Clark Weber Associates. In July 2008 he published a book, Clark Weber's Rock and Roll Radio: The Fun Years, 1955-1975. It is published by Chicago's Books Press (ISBN 0979789222; ISBN 978-0-9797892-2-9).

== Career ==
Weber attended the University of Wisconsin-Milwaukee and served in the U.S. Navy during the Korean War.

Clark Weber, who always referred to himself as "Mother Weber's Oldest Son", began his start in radio as an amateur (ham) radio operator in 1950. After leaving the navy in 1954, Weber's first radio job was at WAUX in Waukesha, Wisconsin. He also worked at WBKV in West Bend, Wisconsin and WRIT in Milwaukee, Wisconsin.

He moved to Chicago in 1961 where he joined the staff of WLS, initially working as a graveyard shift DJ and climbing to program director. This is where Weber became well known spinning Top 40 records. Weber worked in Chicago for WCFL, WMAQ, WIND, WJJD, and recently WAIT, where he did a Friday morning show.

Weber promoted A Senior Moment with Clark Weber, a pre-recorded program series for radio stations targeting senior health issues. In 2015, Weber made the decision to retire from broadcasting; he was 84 at the time. Just prior to his retirement, Weber was named to the Illinois Broadcasters' Hall of Fame.

Weber died of cancer on March 7, 2020, at age 89.
