= WCKL (FM) =

K-Love radio station in Chicago

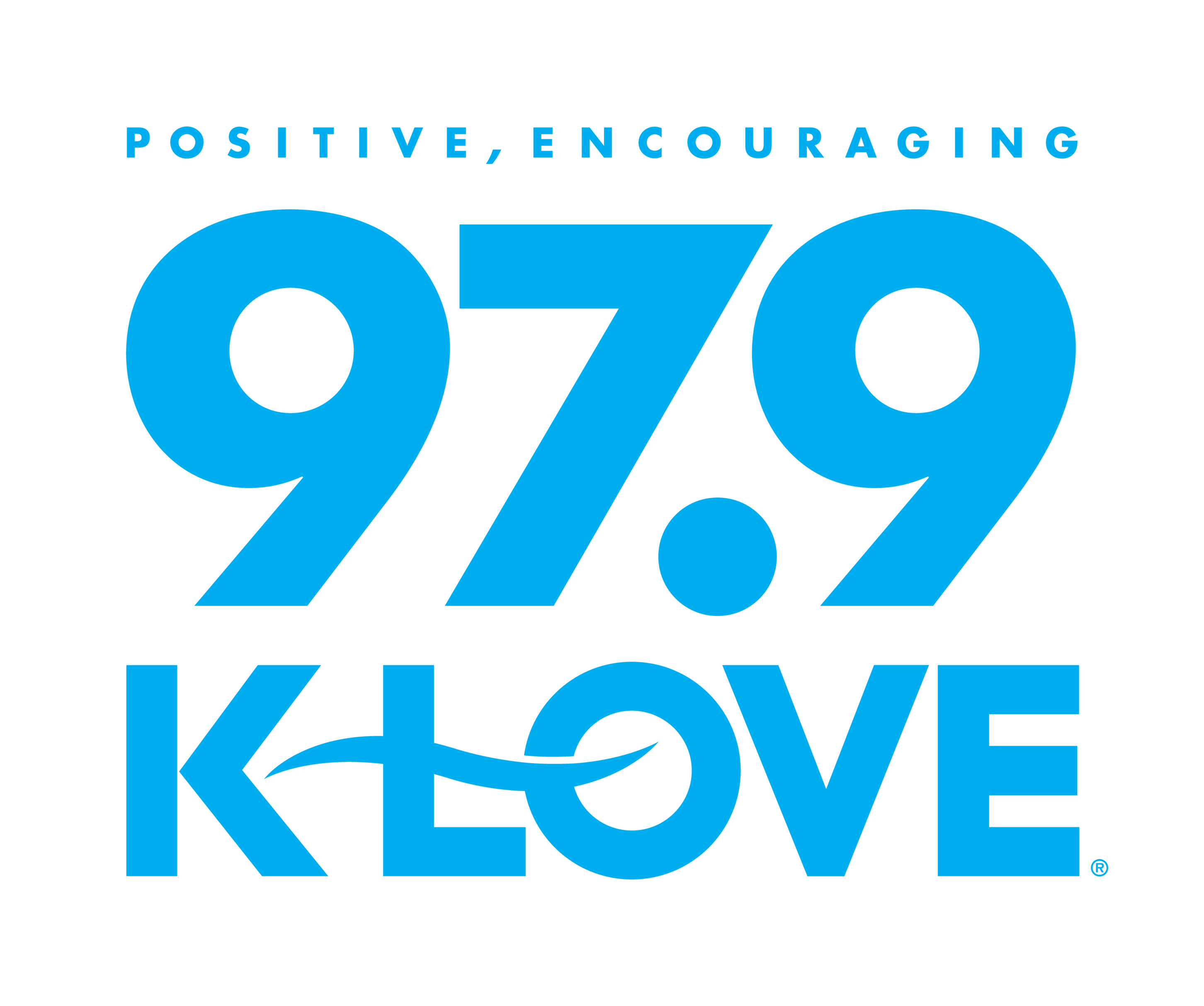
- Chicago, Illinois; United States
- Broadcast area: Chicago metro area
- Frequency: 97.9 MHz (HD Radio)
- Branding: K-Love

Programming
- Format: Christian contemporary
- Subchannels: HD2: Air1; HD3: Christian hip hop
- Network: K-Love

Ownership
- Owner: Educational Media Foundation
- Sister stations: WAWE; WAWY; WLWX; WOKL; WSRI; WZKL

History
- First air date: April 7, 1942
- Former call signs: W83C (1942–1943); WEHS (1943–1963); WHFC (1963–1965); WSDM (1965–1977); WLUP (1977–1987); WLUP-FM (1987–2018); WCKL-FM (2018–2020)
- Former frequencies: 48.3 MHz (1942–1946); 100.1 MHz (1946–1947)
- Call sign meaning: "Chicago's K-Love"

Technical information
- Licensing authority: FCC
- Facility ID: 73233
- Class: B
- ERP: 4,000 watts
- HAAT: 425 meters (1,394 ft)
- Transmitter coordinates: 41°53′56.1″N 87°37′23.2″W
- Translators: HD1: 99.1 W256CA (Joliet); HD3: 97.5 W248BB (Chicago); HD4: 101.5 W268AY (Seward Township)

Links
- Public license information: Public file; LMS
- Webcast: Listen live
- Website: klove.com; myboostnation.com/chicago/ (HD3); nuevavida.com (HD4)

WCKL (97.9 MHz) is a non-commercial FM radio station licensed to Chicago, Illinois, featuring a Christian contemporary format via the K-Love network. Owned and operated by Educational Media Foundation (EMF), WCKL serves the Chicago metro area with a transmitter located atop the John Hancock Center.

One of the oldest surviving FM stations in Chicago, this station signed on the air on April 7, 1942, as W83C. Throughout the station's early existence, it changed callsigns, formats and owners before relaunching itself on March 14, 1977, as WLUP "97.9 The Loop", a nod to the Chicago Loop. As WLUP, the station aired various formats ranging from classic rock, pop rock, pop alternative, and adult alternative formats. It changed ownership several times before being sold to Merlin Media in 2011 and subsequently entered a local marketing agreement (LMA) with Cumulus Media in 2014. This LMA was terminated after Cumulus entered into bankruptcy proceedings, prompting Merlin Media to sell the station to EMF, which relaunched the station as part of the K-Love network on March 10, 2018. The classic rock format and "Loop" branding was retained on the second HD subchannel of WKQX.

In addition to a standard analog transmission, WCKL broadcasts over four HD subchannels and is available online. WCKL-HD2 carries Air1 programming, WCKL-HD3 carries "Boost Radio" Christian hip hop and WCKL-HD4 features Radio Nueva Vida programming.

== History ==
=== Early years as W83C/WEHS/WHFC ===
The station was first granted a construction permit on April 7, 1942, with the call sign W83C, licensed to broadcast at 48.3 MHz on the original 42-50 MHz FM broadcast band. The station was owned by Richard W. Hoffman, who also owned WHFC. Its studios and transmitter were initially located at the Medinah Athletic Club building at 505 N. Michigan Avenue, but were moved to the Bankers Building at 105 West Adams by 1945.

On November 1, 1943, the station was assigned the WEHS call sign, and it was granted its first license on October 8, 1945. The callsign stood for "Elizabeth Hoffman's Station", named for owner Richard Hoffman's mother. In January 1946, the station received permission from the FCC to go silent to convert to operation on the new 88-108 MHz FM broadcast band, which the FCC had created on June 27, 1945. On July 31, 1946, the station was reassigned to 100.1 MHz, and then granted a move to 97.9 MHz on September 23, 1947. WEHS was the first commercial radio station to air "storecasts". It broadcast background music for National Tea grocery stores in the Chicago area. When the contract with National ran out in the mid-1950s, WEHS simulcast the foreign language and Black programming of co-owned WHFC for six hours a day, the minimum broadcast time to keep the license. In 1952, WEHS's studios and transmitter were moved to WHFC's studio and transmitter site at 3350 S. Kedzie.

L & P Broadcasting Corporation purchased WEHS in February 1963, along with WHFC, for $1 million. The Chess family of Chess, Checker and Cadet Records fame owned L & P Broadcasting (the "L" stood for Leonard Chess while the "P" stood for brother Phil Chess). Leonard primarily ran the record labels and recording studio while brother Phil was president of the radio company. The WHFC call sign was moved to WEHS on March 3, 1963, while WHFC was assigned the WVON ("The Voice of the Negro") call sign. WHFC aired an R&B format and simulcast WVON 24 hours a day.

=== WSDM ===
On March 8, 1965, WHFC's call sign was changed to WSDM, which stood for "Smack Dab in the Middle", in reference to the station's position at the middle of the FM dial. The station was also known as "the station with the girls and all that jazz", as it featured all female DJs known as "Den Pals", which included Yvonne Daniels, Danae Alexander, Cody Sweet, Penny Lane, Nancy Plum, Connie Szerszen, known on the air as "Dawn", and Linda Ellerbee, known on the air as "Hush Puppy". WSDM played "pop-oriented jazz and jazz oriented pop". Program director was Mickey Shorr and later Burt Burdeen.

In 1968, the station began airing a nighttime progressive rock program called Underground Den on weekends. In early 1971, WSDM began to mix rock music with its light jazz. The station positioned itself as "jazzed up rock". Ownership of the station was transferred to Phil Chess effective October 22, 1971. Phil Chess' son, Terry Chess, was general manager. In 1972, WSDM's transmitter was moved to the John Hancock Center. Actress Cindy Morgan was a DJ on the station in the 1970s.

=== WLUP ===
The Loop's logo during most of its 40 years as a rock station. Without the frequency, it remains the logo for WKQX-HD2's iteration of The Loop.

The call sign was changed to WLUP on March 14, 1977. The station adopted an album-oriented rock (AOR) format and was rebranded as "The Loop", referring to the nickname of Chicago's central business district. Jay Blackburn was Program Director and Tommy O'Toole served as the station's first morning host and was the first Loop DJ to sign on the air. The first song O'Toole played on "The Loop" was "Morning Has Broken" by Cat Stevens. The original Loop air staff included Tommy in mornings, William "Captain Billy" Martin in middays, Lester "Les" Tracy in afternoons, and Bob Shannon evenings. Other early Loop DJs included Greg Budell, Ford Colley, Don Davis, and Glory-June Greaif.

Heftel Broadcasting Corporation, owned by Hawaiian Congressman Cecil Heftel, purchased the station effective March 5, 1979, for $3 million. Lee Abrams was hired as consultant. The rock format was kept in place, but emphasis was put on harder-edged rock. Jesse Bullit was the program director. Steve Dahl, who had been unemployed since WDAI (94.7 FM) went to a disco format in December 1978, began hosting mornings on March 19, 1979. On July 12, 1979, Dahl staged one of the most famous promotions in radio and sports history, Disco Demolition Night. Garry Meier, known over the air at the time as "Matthew Meier", was an overnight DJ, and was later teamed with Dahl as the morning newsman. Soon thereafter, Meier became Steve's full-time sidekick, and used his real name, Garry Meier.

In 1979, Jeff Schwartz became head of sales and Mitch Michaels was hired as afternoon DJ. Michaels became program director shortly thereafter. Sky Daniels was also hired in 1979, and served as disc jockey and music director. Chuck Swirsky provided sports reports for a period in the early 1980s. Buzz Killman was newsman. On February 6, 1981, Steve Dahl was fired for what WLUP's management and Dahl said was a contract dispute, though Heftel Broadcasting said it was for violating "community standards". Garry Meier left the station as well, to remain Dahl's sidekick. A series of morning men including Matt Bisbee, Mark McEwen, and the team of R.J. Harris and Pat Still tried their hand until Jonathon Brandmeier was hired in late 1982. Kilman remained as newsman, and Bruce Wolf joined the station as a sports reporter in 1982. Greg Solk became program director in 1983. Dr. Demento was carried on WLUP from 1978 through 2010, just prior to when Dr. Demento ceased over-the-air broadcasting. Steve and Garry returned in 1986 to host afternoons.

In late December 1986, Heftel Broadcasting merged with Statewide Broadcasting, owner of WCFL (1000 AM). In April 1987, WCFL became WLUP, and the FM station was assigned the WLUP-FM call sign. WLUP (AM) became a partial simulcast of WLUP-FM, and Steve and Garry moved to the AM station. In 1988, WLUP-AM-FM were sold to the newly formed Evergreen Media. By 1989, the AM station would evolve to mostly talk with a few rock songs mixed in per hour.

In the early 1990s, WLUP aired a popular television commercial featuring a fat man dubbed "Joey Bag O' Donuts" dancing. In the time span since the original commercial was aired, the footage of the dancing fat man in the commercial has been used by numerous other radio stations across the country and abroad.

In September 1992, Steve and Garry returned to mornings on WLUP-FM. In September 1993, the pairing of Steve Dahl and Garry Meier broke up. Shortly thereafter, Dahl moved to AM 1000, which had recently added ESPN sports programming and changed call letters to WMVP.

On September 27, 1993, the station's lineup was overhauled, and it shifted towards a hot talk format. Garry Meier moved to middays on WLUP-FM, Brandmeier would move to afternoons, and Kevin Matthews moved to mornings for a time (though Brandmeier would later move back to mornings, and Matthews would move to middays). Danny Bonaduce hosted evenings, Ed Schwartz hosted overnights, and Seka hosted a program Saturday evenings. Liz Wilde was hired to host evenings in March 1995, but her show was cancelled by November of the same year. In February 1996, sister station WYNY in New York City simulcasted WLUP for a day as part of a week-long stunt of simulcasting sister stations nationwide before flipping formats to rhythmic adult contemporary as WKTU. In June 1996, WMVP (1000 AM) dropped their sports format and returned to simulcasting WLUP.

WLUP switched to a format featuring a "blend of pop rock, pop alternative, and adult alternative" music on September 30, 1996. Brandmeier remained the morning man and Dave Fogel was brought in for afternoons. In 1997, Evergreen and Chancellor Media merged. In order to stay under federally mandated ownership limits, Evergreen opted to sell WLUP to Bonneville International in July. On July 21 at 5 a.m., after stunting with all-The Who songs as part of a Who concert that previous weekend, WLUP switched back to a rock format. The first song under the relaunched "Loop" was "Rock and Roll" by Led Zeppelin. Also that month, Jonathon Brandmeier would be released from the station due to the ownership change. In June 1998, WLUP shifted to classic rock and adopted the slogan, "Classic Rock That Really Rocks". During this period, full-time on air personalities included Byrd (now with WDRV Chicago), Steve Downes, Eddie Webb, Pete McMurray, Seaver, Cara Carriveau, Sari, and Mark Zander.

In October 2004, Emmis Communications traded three of their stations in Phoenix to Bonneville for WLUP-FM and $70 million; the swap was completed in December of that year. While under Emmis ownership WLUP evolved into a mainstream rock format, but in January 2011 it reverted to classic rock.

In 2005, Emmis brought back Jonathon Brandmeier to do mornings on The Loop and hired Zakk Tyler to host afternoon drive. Erin Carmen began hosting middays in 2006, remaining with the station until 2009. Brandmeier also exited WLUP in 2009.

On January 15, 2007, Chicago's NBC owned-and-operated station, WMAQ-TV (channel 5), began a new weekday morning show called Barely Today which aired from 4:30–5 a.m. The new morning show was simulcast on WLUP-FM and hosted by Bruce Wolf, who was the former weekday morning traffic/sports anchor for WMAQ. The show would be cancelled five months later due to poor ratings.

Through 2010, WLUP served as the de facto flagship station for Dr. Demento, the nationally syndicated comedy and novelty music show. The show remained produced in California at host Barret Hansen's home studio; WLUP had been given special dispensation to carry the show for free to ensure carriage in a large market, whereas he charged money to his other affiliates to license the show. WLUP cancelled the program in 2010, prompting Hansen to withdraw the program from syndication and move the show exclusively to a paid online offering for the rest of its run.

On June 21, 2011, Emmis announced that it would sell WKQX, sister station WLUP-FM, and New York's WRXP to Merlin Media, a group headed by former Tribune Company executive Randy Michaels. Emmis, who would retain a minority stake in Merlin Media, would grant Merlin a local marketing agreement to operate WKQX and WLUP-FM from July 15 until the sale to Merlin officially closed on September 1.

On May 3, 2012, Merlin added a satellite-fed version of the smooth jazz format on WLUP's HD3 subchannel (97.9-HD3).

Radio personality and WEBN alum Maxwell Slater "Max" Logan (Benjamin Bornstein), best known for his years as host of The Maxwell Show at WMMS and WNCX in Cleveland, took over as the WLUP-FM morning host on July 30, 2012. Former personality Zakk Tyler (Dominic Zaccagnini) also returned.

On January 3, 2014, Merlin Media announced a local marketing agreement (LMA) with Cumulus Media that would see Cumulus take over operations of WLUP-FM and sister station WIQI as well as inherit Merlin's LMA for WKQX-LP. The deal included an option for Cumulus to purchase the stations from Merlin. The deal saw Merlin relinquish operations of its last remaining radio stations. The deal also sees an expansion of Cumulus' Chicago reach; the company already owned and operated news/talk station WLS (890 AM) and classic hits station WLS-FM (94.7 FM).

On September 12, 2014, WLUP released morning hosts Maxwell (Benjamin Bornstein) and John Czahor and afternoon host Patrick Capone. On September 15, 2014, a new weekday lineup was announced, with Lyndsey Marie hosting middays, Tim Virgin hosting afternoons, and Pyke hosting evenings. Virgin previously worked at The Loop in the mid-1990s. Mornings remained open. On March 30, 2015, Mancow Muller joined WLUP as its new morning show host.

WLUP's first ever "Rock Girl", Lorelei Shark, was the official spokesperson and the face of The Loop in the late 1970s and 1980s. In 2005, the Loop Rock Girl was reintroduced, with Erica Gustafson being the new holder of the title. Another prominent Loop Rock Girl prior to the station's 2018 closure was April Rose Haydock, who also served in that role in 2007.

=== Sale to EMF ===
In January 2018, as part of Cumulus Media's bankruptcy proceedings, the company requested that a U.S. Bankruptcy Court release the company from several "extremely unprofitable" contracts, including its LMAs with WLUP-FM and WKQX. Cumulus stated that under the agreement, which carries a monthly fee of $600,000, the company had lost $8.4 million on the two Merlin stations.

On March 5, 2018, Merlin Media sold WLUP-FM to Educational Media Foundation (EMF) for $21.5 million; with the sale, EMF announced it would convert the station to non-commercial educational status. The sale was prompted by Cumulus Media's Chapter 11 bankruptcy filing, in which it was determined that Cumulus would not proceed with the existing LMA or a sale of WLUP-FM from Merlin to Cumulus. The move gives EMF its second full-power outlet in Chicago; the organization also owns translators and lower-power stations in the market. On March 6, Cumulus ended staffed operations on WLUP-FM and the entire air staff was dismissed; however, the Mancow show continued via its independent online streaming platform. An automated playlist of music continued until March 10 at midnight, when EMF took control of the frequency from Merlin under a new LMA and assumed the K-Love schedule carried by future sister station WJKL (94.3 FM). Cumulus also retained the WLUP-FM call sign, warehousing it on an existing station in Cambridge, Minnesota. Merlin retained the "Loop" intellectual property and transitioned that branding to WKQX-HD2 in a fully automated form.

The sale of WLUP-FM also ended the annual "Loopfest", a sponsored event the most recent version of which was planned for August 3, 2018 at Hollywood Casino Amphitheatre, with Lynyrd Skynyrd to support their final tour with .38 Special and the Marshall Tucker Band. WLUP-FM informed listeners who bought tickets that the event was canceled immediately after the station announced it the previous February, despite leaving event details on its website while not indicating who may take over the sponsorship.

Upon hearing the news of the sale, Steve Dahl pointed to WLUP-FM's legacy and heritage, saying:

As I look back on my 40 years on the radio in this market, I am reminded almost daily of The Loop's impact not only my career, but also rock and roll history in Chicago, and around the world. They just don't make brave risk-taking local radio stations like that anymore, and that's everybody's loss. I hope the last song they play there is AC/DC's 'Highway to Hell'!

On March 9, 2018, Dahl gave listeners a chance to say goodbye to WLUP-FM via a simulcast of his afternoon program on WLS. Dahl also brought back alumni Sky Daniels and Kevin Matthews to help give WLUP-FM a proper send off, while WDRV paid homage to the station with a day long tribute led by Bob Stroud, another WLUP-FM veteran, with guests and surprises. WGN's 'Dave Plier Show' also aired a reunion of ex-WLUP-FM DJs, including Kevin Matthews, current WGN hosts Wendy Snyder and Bill Leff, and broadcast executive Larry Wert, paying tribute to its legacy.

The LMA with EMF took effect March 10, 2018 at midnight, at which point the station switched to K-Love. In a last jab at the impending transition to Christian music, WLUP-FM, after spending a majority of their final hour playing songs themed around farewells and/or departures, closed by playing, for their final block of music, "Shout at the Devil" by Mötley Crüe, "The Number of the Beast" by Iron Maiden, and (as Dahl suggested) "Highway to Hell". EMF's purchase of WCKL-FM was consummated on May 31, 2018.

On January 16, 2020, EMF changed the station's call sign to the current WCKL. Around that time, EMF returned the HD Radio subchannels to the air with its Christian worship-formatted Air1 network on WCKL-HD2 and Christian classic hits from K-Love Classics on WCKL-HD3. In late 2020, with the demise of the K-Love Classics format, that network became "K-Love Christmas" for the duration of the holiday season. Following that, WCKL-HD3 debuted "K-Love 2000s", a Christian classic hits variant. In March 2021, WCKL-HD3 adopted the "Boost Radio" Christian pop/hip hop format from KXBS in St. Louis as part of an agreement between that station's owners and EMF, and began simulcasting on translator 97.5 W248BB.

== Translators ==
Call sign	Frequency	City of license	FID	ERP (W)	Class	Transmitter coordinates	FCC info	Notes
W256CA	99.1 FM	Joliet, Illinois	145160	10	D	41°32′26.1″N 88°2′8.2″W	LMS	—
W248BB	97.5 FM	Chicago, Illinois	144731	250	D	41°53′6.1″N 87°37′18.1″W	LMS	Relays HD3
W268AY	101.5 FM	Seward Township, Illinois	145107	250	D	41°53′56.1″N 87°37′23.2″W	LMS	Relays HD4
