= Southeast Side, Chicago =

Coordinates: 41°46′N 87°34′W

The Southeast side of Chicago officially begins East of State Street going southwards. It extends south and east to the city limits, generally keeping between Lake Michigan and Lake Calumet. Politically, the Southeast side is contiguous with the 10th Ward.

There are many neighborhoods within the boundaries of the Southeast side, including Windsor Park, Calumet, Hyde Park, Bronzeville, Chatham South Chicago, the East Side, Irondale, South Deering and Hegewisch.

In 2024, the far southeast side was 5.24 percent white, 20.22 percent Hispanic or Latino, 72.09 percent black or African American, 0.37 percent Asian, and 2.08 percent other.
