= Phillips Graduate University =

Graduate school in Los Angeles, California

Coordinates: 34.242023°N 118.567625°W

- Former names: Phillips Graduate Institute; California Family Study Center
- Type: Private graduate school
- Active: 1971–2019
- Founders: Clinton E. Phillips; T. David Jansen
- Location: Chatsworth and Sunnyvale, California, United States

Phillips Graduate University was a private graduate school in Chatsworth, Los Angeles, with an administrative office in Sunnyvale, California. It provided numerous degrees including doctoral degrees in Business Administration, Psychology, Organizational Management & Consulting and master's degrees in family therapy, art therapy, and human relations.

== History ==
In 1971, Clinton E. Phillips and David Jansen, who had worked in the field of family systems theory and family therapy with Paul Popenoe at the American Institute of Family Relations, founded the California Family Study Center. Its first location was in Burbank, but it later relocated to campuses in North Hollywood, Encino, and Chatsworth. In 1992, the institution was renamed Phillips Graduate Institute and in 2016 it was changed to Phillips Graduate University. The university transferred the marriage and family therapy program in 2019 to Campbellsville University which opened an off-campus instructional site, the Los Angeles Education Center, at the former location of Phillips Graduate University.

Until April 30, 2019, it was accredited by the Western Association of Schools and Colleges. It trained more than 2,700 family therapists, and worked in conjunction with the California Family Counseling Center which operated in the same location.

Presidents at PGU have included Ed Cox (1981–1999), Lisa Porché-Burke (1999–2009), and Yolanda J. Nunn Gorman (2009–2016).

== Academics ==
The university's focus was on master's degree and professional doctorate degrees in psychology and the field of human relations, and organizational development, as well as post-graduate credential programs and continuing education workshops for mental health practitioners interested in furthering their knowledge.

== Publications ==
From 1992 to 1998, seven volumes of the peer-reviewed journal Progress: Family Systems Research and Therapy were published by Phillips Graduate Institute.

== Notable alumni ==
- Margaret Avery
- Donna Hilbert
- Barbara Minkus
- Dick Orkin
- Carol Potter
