= WBBM =

WBBM may refer to the following broadcast media outlets in the Chicago, Illinois area:

- WBBM-TV, a television station (digital channel 12 or virtual channel 2) licensed to Chicago and an owned-and-operated affiliate of the CBS Television Network
- Any of three radio stations formerly owned by CBS Radio and currently owned by Audacy:
  - WBBM (AM), a radio station (780 AM) licensed to Chicago that broadcasts an all-news format and is affiliated with ABC News Radio
  - WBBM-FM, a radio station (96.3 FM) licensed to Chicago and broadcasting a contemporary hit radio format
  - WCFS-FM, a radio station (105.9 FM) licensed to the Chicago suburb of Elmwood Park, Illinois that simulcasts the all-news format of WBBM (AM)
