= WJJD =

WJJD may refer to:

- WJJD-LP, a radio station (101.3 FM) licensed to Kokomo, Indiana, United States
- WYLL, a radio station (1160 AM) licensed to Chicago, Illinois, United States, which held the call sign WJJD from 1924 until April 1997
- WSCR-FM, a radio station (104.3 FM) licensed to Chicago, Illinois, United States, which held the callsign WJJD-FM from 1961 until 1977
