= WSCR-FM =

Simulcast with WSCR, Chicago
- Chicago, Illinois; United States
- Broadcast area: Chicago metropolitan area; Northwest Indiana
- Frequency: 104.3 MHz (HD Radio)
- Branding: 104-3 The Score

Programming
- Language: English
- Format: Sports radio
- Subchannels: HD2: Sports and betting talk BetMGM Network
- Affiliations: BetMGM Network; Chicago Bulls; Chicago Cubs; DePaul Blue Demons; Illinois Fighting Illini; Westwood One Sports

Ownership
- Owner: Audacy, Inc.; (Audacy License, LLC)
- Sister stations: WBBM; WBBM-FM; WCFS-FM; WSCR; WUSN; WXRT

History
- First air date: September 1953
- Former call signs: WSEL (1953–1960); WJJD-FM (1960–1977); WJEZ (1977–1984); WJMK (1984–2017); WBMX (2017–2026)
- Call sign meaning: Sports score

Technical information
- Licensing authority: FCC
- Facility ID: 28621
- Class: B
- ERP: 4,100 watts (analog); 163 watts (digital)
- HAAT: 480 meters (1,570 ft)
- Transmitter coordinates: 41°52′44.1″N 87°38′8.2″W

Links
- Public license information: Public file; LMS
- Webcast: Listen live (via Audacy); Listen live (via iHeartRadio)
- Website: www.audacy.com/thescorechicago

WSCR-FM (104.3 FM, 104-3 The Score) is a commercial radio station in Chicago, Illinois, serving the Chicago metropolitan area and Northwest Indiana. The station is owned by Audacy, Inc. and airs a simulcast of WSCR's sports radio format.

WSCR-FM's studios and offices are located at Two Prudential Plaza in the Chicago Loop. The station has an effective radiated power (ERP) of 4,100 watts, with its transmitter atop the Willis Tower (formerly Sears Tower). WSCR-FM broadcasts in the HD Radio format, with simulcasting on co-owned AM station WSCR.

== History ==
=== WSEL ===
The station began broadcasting in September 1953, holding the call sign WSEL. It aired beautiful music, light classical music, recorded music and show tunes along with news reports. The station had an ERP of 40,000 watts, and its transmitter was located atop Chicago's Randolph Tower. WSEL was owned by Chicago Skyway Broadcasting Company.

A previous station in Chicago had briefly operated on 104.3 MHz in 1949. WCFL-FM, owned by the Chicago Federation of Labor, broadcast from 3 to 9 p.m. as a 400-watt simulcast of WCFL, but the owners surrendered the station's license, as it was not profitable.

In 1958, WSEL's transmitter was moved to the Willoughby Tower at 8 South Michigan Avenue. In 1960, the station was sold to Plough Broadcasting for $50,000, and it was taken silent.

=== WJJD-FM ===
The station returned to the air January 2, 1961, with its call sign changed to WJJD-FM. It was co-owned with 1160 WJJD by Plough Broadcasting. At the time, 1160 WJJD was a daytimer. WJJD-FM initially aired classical music, show tunes, folk music, and jazz.

On February 15, 1965, WJJD adopted a country music format, and WJJD-FM simulcast 1160 WJJD, with WJJD-FM continuing WJJD's country programming after sunset.

In 1971, the station's transmitter was moved to the Prudential Building, and its ERP was reduced to 14,100 watts.

=== WJEZ ===
In February 1977, the station's call sign was changed to WJEZ. The station adopted a "beautiful country" format, playing easy listening country music, with large amount of instrumentals, in an approach patterned on the beautiful music format.

In September 1978, the station adopted a "modern country" format, with a playlist that was approximately 80% country, 20% adult contemporary. The station was branded "Z-104". In 1982, WJEZ gained competition as WUSN also adopted a country format. At that point, WJJD 1160 adopted an adult standards format, known as "The Music Of Your Life". In 1984, Infinity Broadcasting acquired WJEZ and WJJD for $13.5 million.

=== Oldies era ===
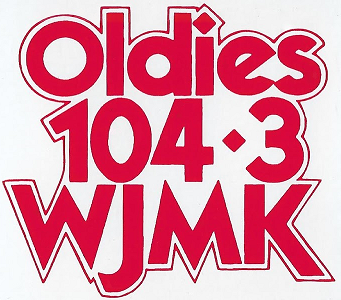
Logo in the 1990s as "Oldies 104.3"

In early August 1984, the station adopted an oldies format as "Magic 104" and its call sign was changed to WJMK.< Dick Biondi was the first disc jockey heard on "Magic 104". Ron Britain was also one of WJMK's original DJs. Initially, "Magic 104" included a few currents in its playlist, but by early 1985, all songs from the current decade were dropped, with the station playing music from the 1950s, 1960s, and early 1970s.

In 1987, the station's transmitter was moved to the Sears Tower, and its ERP was reduced to 4,100 watts.

In 1991, the station's moniker was changed to "Oldies 104.3". In early September 1993, John Records Landecker joined WJMK as morning drive DJ, remaining with the station until 2003.

In 1996, Infinity Broadcasting was purchased by the parent company of CBS.

In 1999, with competition from the new Jammin' Oldies format of WUBT, WJMK increased the number of 1970s songs playing 3 to 4 per hour on the station while reducing the number of 1950s songs to about 2 per hour, and playing a total number of pre-1964 to about 3 per hour. The station added several dozen 80s songs playing about 1 every 2 hours. By 2002, the station had replaced the All Request Saturday Night oldies show with a 1970s and early 80s program.

On February 15, 2002, WJMK returned to its former moniker, "Magic 104.3", and its playlist was shifted to include more 1980s music, while further reducing the music played from the '50s and early '60s. In July 2003, the station once again changed monikers, going back to "Oldies 104.3" and its playlist was refocused on music of the '60s and '70s. In 2004, the station dropped the "Oldies" moniker and became known simply as "104.3 WJMK" with the slogan "The Greatest Hits of the 60s and 70s".

=== Jack FM ===
On June 3, 2005, at 4 pm, WJMK switched to an adult hits format known as "Jack FM". On the same day, veteran oldies station WCBS-FM in New York City made the same switch exactly one hour later at 5 pm. The station had a 1980s centric playlist, along with some titles from the 1960s, 1970s, 1990s, and 2000s. It usually had no live DJs and instead used sarcastic remarks voiced by Howard Cogan during breaks.

Though WJMK's previous oldies format continued to be streamed online and on the WJMK's second HD Radio subchannel, complaints about WJMK's switch were numerous. In July 2006, in a cost-cutting move by CBS Radio, the entire DJ staff of WJMK-HD2 was laid off. Shortly thereafter, 94.7 WZZN, which had recently switched to an oldies format, hired several of WJMK's former airstaff.

With a format change on WCKG from hot talk to adult contemporary, Steve Dahl and Buzz Kilman moved to WJMK to host mornings on November 5, 2007. Dahl was dismissed on December 5, 2008. With the exception of Dahl and Kilman, Chicago's Jack FM had no live personalities.

WJMK's ratings plummeted after the switch to Jack FM, and the station saw further ratings erosion when Bonneville International debuted "Rewind 100.3" (a mostly 1980s-based format) on rival WILV in June 2010.

=== K-Hits ===
On March 10, 2011, CBS Radio announced the station would return to their previous classic hits format as "104.3 K-Hits", setting the time of relaunch for the following Monday, March 14, at 1:04 pm; at 12:30 that afternoon, after playing "Goodbye to You" by Scandal, the station began stunting with a 34-minute montage of songs and pop culture clips, demarked year by year from 1966 to 1989; at the time promised, "K-Hits" was then launched with "Beginnings" by, fittingly, Chicago.

Chicago radio personalities Ed Volkman and Joe "Bohannon" Colborn (Eddie and JoBo) hosted the station's morning show, along with Gary Spears in middays, Bo Reynolds in afternoon drive time and George McFly heard in the evening. Weekend hosts included Tommy Edwards, Ken Cocker, and John Calhoun.

Eddie and JoBo were released on December 6, 2012, with the station citing low ratings as the main factor. Mornings were then hosted by Dave Fogel, formerly of WLS-FM. Tommy Edwards retired from radio on September 12, 2014. The rest of the station's final airstaff included Brian Peck in middays and Jeffrey T. Mason in afternoon drive.

In its last year, WJMK primarily played music from the 1970s and 1980s.

=== 104.3 Jams ===
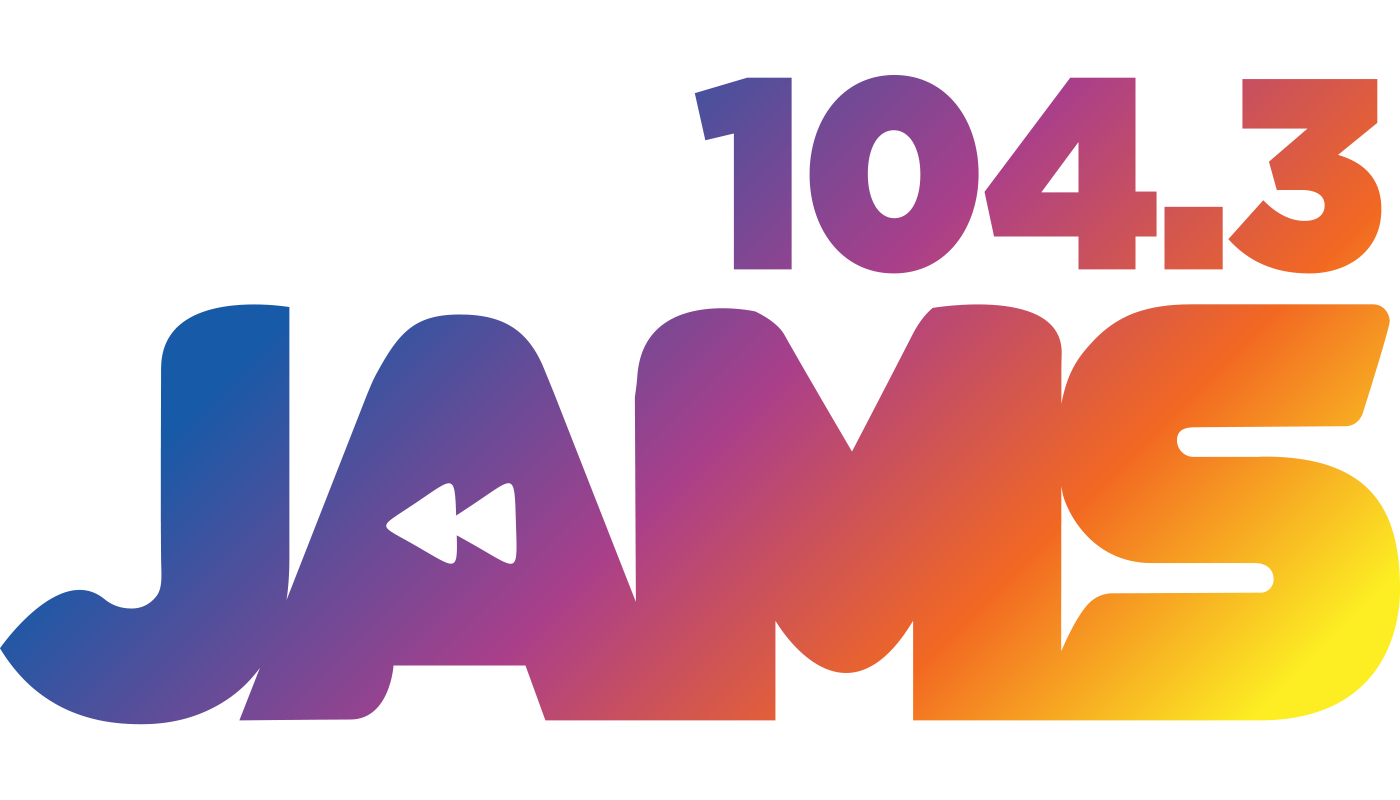
Logo as 104.3 Jams, 2017-2026

On February 2, 2017, CBS Radio announced it would merge with Entercom. The merger was approved on November 9, and was consummated on November 17.

On November 17, at 10 am, after playing "The Long and Winding Road" by The Beatles and "Changes" by David Bowie, WJMK began stunting with sound effects and clips of a man giving occasional comments, such as "What's going on here?" and "It's almost time to start." One hour later, WJMK flipped to classic hip-hop, branded as "104.3 Jams", which began with an introduction by legendary rapper, actress, radio DJ, and station voice MC Lyte. The first song on "Jams" was "Hypnotize" by The Notorious B.I.G.

Entercom applied to move the WBMX call sign to 104.3 from its sister station in Boston to match the new format; the change took effect on December 4, 2017. The WBMX call letters had previously been used by new rival WVAZ from 1974 to 1988. In addition to WVAZ, WBMX also competed with WPWX and WGCI in the urban radio market.

WBMX was the second station in Chicago to use the "Jams" moniker, the first station being WEJM in the mid-1990s.

=== WSCR sports simulcast ===
In March 2023, radio news outlet RadioInsight reported a rumor that WBMX would begin simulcasting co-owned sports talk station WSCR and merge its personnel and playlists with that of WBBM-FM, complete with Audacy registering a 1043thescore.com web domain. While the rumors proved unfounded at the time, WBBM-FM did, from that time forward, gradually assume more classic hip-hop songs into their playlist and effectively assume the prime focus for Audacy Chicago afterwards, as WBMX was slowly de-emphasized as a prime format.

On January 14, 2026, both RadioInsight and Chicago news outlet Barrett Media officially reported confirmation that WBMX would drop its classic hip-hop format and begin simulcasting sister station WSCR on February 2; in particular, RadioInsight confirmed WSCR staffers were notified of the move that morning and that Audacy had reactivated the 1043thescore.com web domain; Audacy officially confirmed the rumors in a press release that afternoon. Concurrent with the format change, the WBMX call sign would be returned to WWBX in Boston, with the official filing for a callsign exchange for WSCR-FM filed on January 16.

While the station ran mostly jockless following the announcement of the move, afternoon host Sean "Sonic" Leckie, the only remaining host native to the station (and who himself moved to WBBM-FM following the move), hosted an hour-long goodbye show for the "Jams" format on January 29 from 6-7 p.m., including replaying the November 2017 launch as a tribute to station imaging producer John Ross, before signing off his last show on "Jams", and effectively the live run of the station, with "End Of The Road" by Boyz II Men. Though the following block of songs was punctuated with songs with the word "Jam" in their titles (including the first four consecutive songs after the show), the station otherwise continued to run, albeit jockless, until 6 a.m. the following day. After playing "No Diggity" by Blackstreet (notably featuring Chicago native Dave Hollister), the station finally ended the "Jams" format and began temporarily simulcasting WBBM-FM (with the simulcast even being branded on Audacy as "B96 on 104.3 Jams") as a final transition until the simulcast with WSCR began at 8 a.m. on February 2. (Notably, the "Score" simulcast debuted with a live-in-studio performance of "The Star Spangled Banner" by John Vincent, who is the resident singer of the national anthem at Wrigley Field before games of the Chicago Cubs, for whom 104.3 serves as the FM flagship station.)
