= Two Prudential Plaza =

Skyscraper in Chicago, Illinois

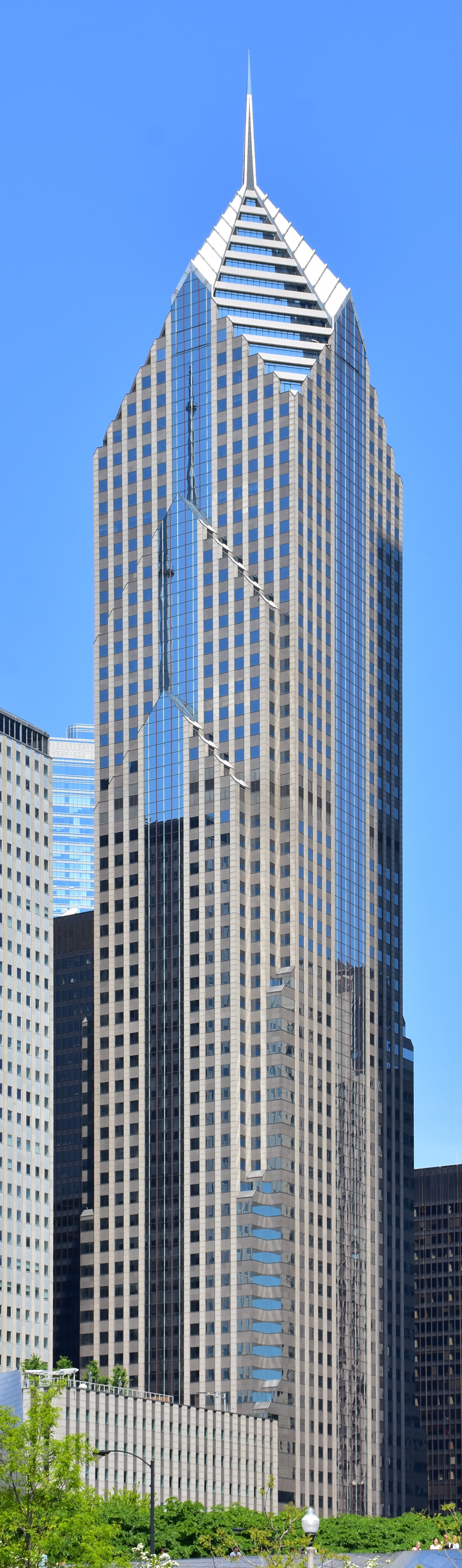
- Two Prudential Plaza in May 2016

- Location within Chicago metropolitan area Location within Illinois Location within the United States

General information
- Status: Completed
- Type: Mixed use
- Architectural style: Postmodernist
- Location: 180 N. Stetson Av. Chicago, Illinois; United States
- Coordinates: 41°53′08″N 87°37′22″W
- Construction started: 1988
- Completed: 1990

Height
- Architectural: 995 ft (303 m)
- Top floor: 820 ft (250 m)

Technical details
- Floor count: 64
- Floor area: 1,399,986 sq ft (130,063.0 m^{2})

Design and construction
- Architects: Loebl Schlossman & Hackl; Stephen T. Wright
- Structural engineer: CBM Engineers Inc.
- Main contractor: Turner Construction Company

Website
- onetwopru.com

Two Prudential Plaza is a 64-story skyscraper located in the Loop area of Chicago, Illinois, United States. At 995 feet (303 m) tall, it is the seventh-tallest building in Chicago as of 2022 and the 33rd-tallest in the U.S., being only five feet from 1,000 feet, making it the closest of any building under 1,000. Built in 1990, the building was designed by the firm Loebl Schlossman & Hackl, with Stephen T. Wright as the principal in charge of design. It has received eight awards, including winning the Best Structure Award from the Structural Engineers Association of Illinois in 1995.

== History ==
Construction started in 1988, and Two Prudential Plaza was completed in 1990. At the time of completion, Two Prudential was the world's tallest reinforced concrete building. Its distinctive shape features stacked chevron setbacks on the north and south sides, a pyramidal peak rotated 45°, and an 80-foot (24 m) spire.

The building is attached to One Prudential Plaza (formerly known as the Prudential Building) since 1992. Without its spire, the building's height is still slightly greater than that of One Prudential Plaza's pinnacle.

In May 2006, BentleyForbes, a Los Angeles–based real estate investment firm run by Frederick Wehba and his family, purchased Two Prudential Plaza, along with its sister property, One Prudential Plaza for $470 million (equivalent to $751 million in 2025).

In 2015, BentleyForbes defaulted on the mortgage for the towers due to the Great Recession and New York–based investors 601W Companies and Berkley Properties took control of the property after investing more than $100 million (more than $136 million in 2025) in equity to recapitalize. BentleyForbes continues to have an interest in the owning partnership.

== Tenants ==
The Consulate General of Canada in Chicago is located in Suite 2400. The Flag of Canada is flown next to that of the United States in the building's Lake Street plaza.

Audacy occupies the ninth to twelfth floors, including WBBM, WBBM-FM, WBMX, WXRT, WUSN, WSCR and WCFS.

== In popular culture ==
The building and the plaza appear in the 1994 film Richie Rich as Rich Industries Inc.

== Gallery ==
Two Prudential Plaza
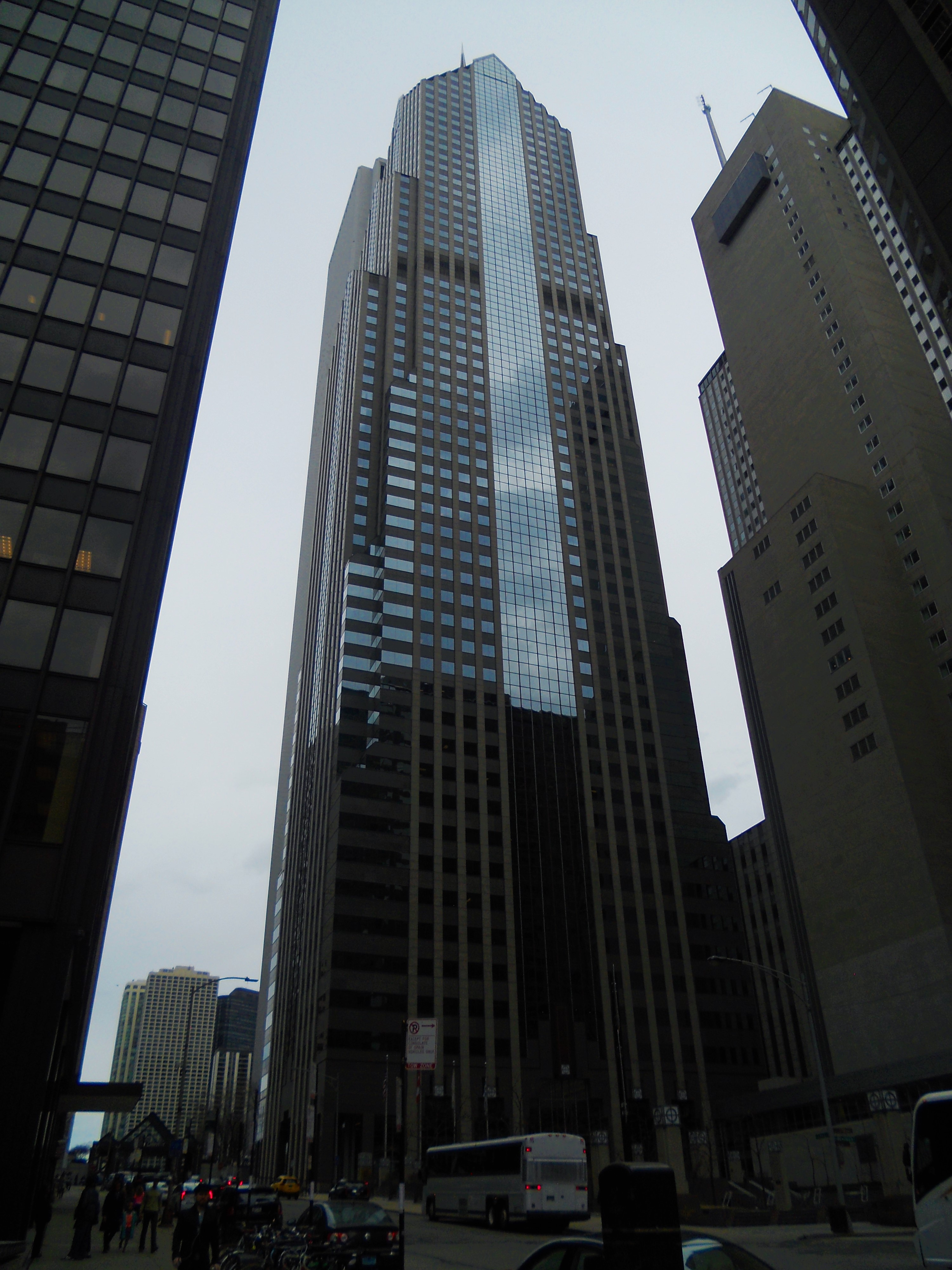
Pictured in 2015

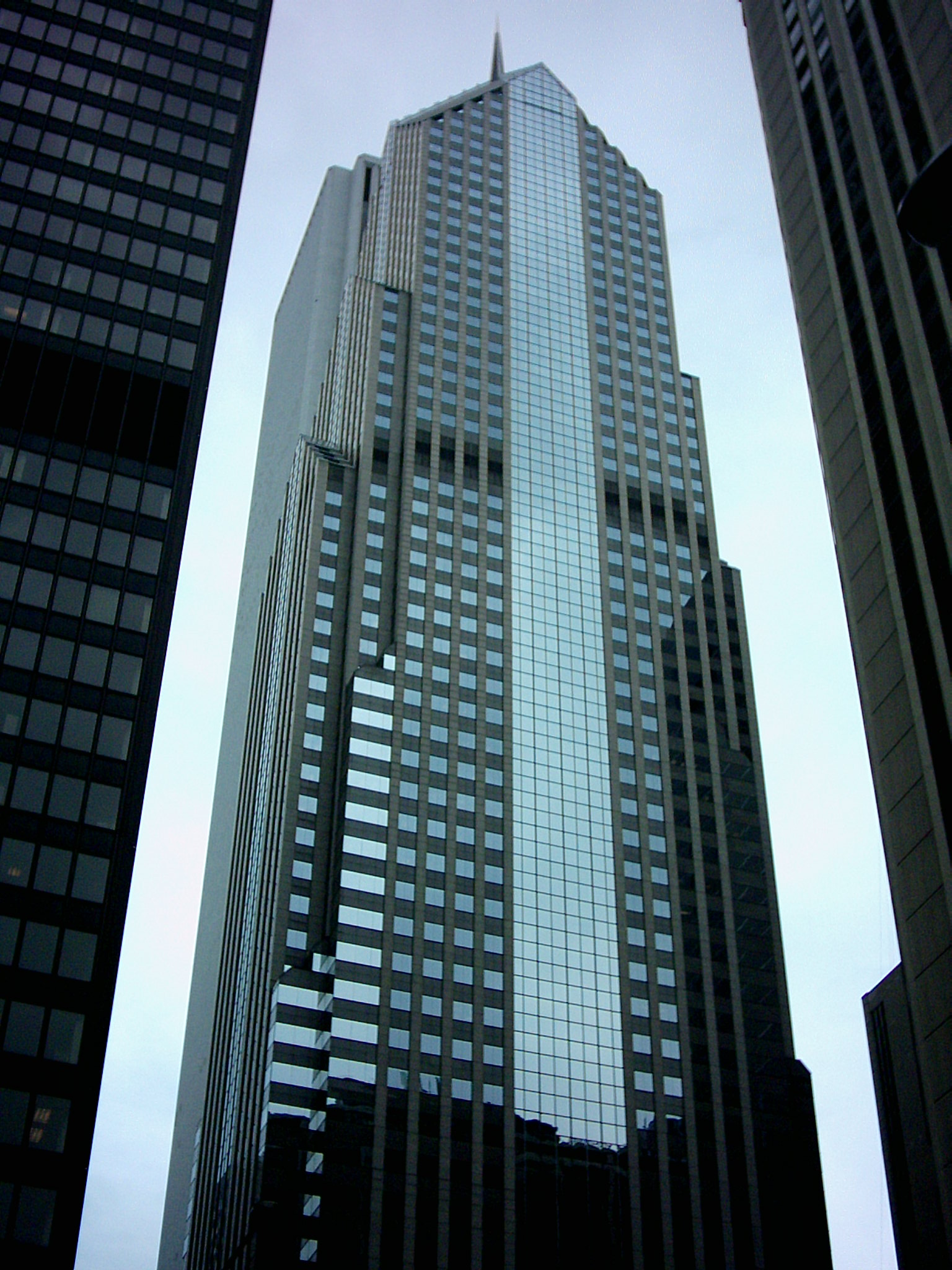
Pictured in 2006

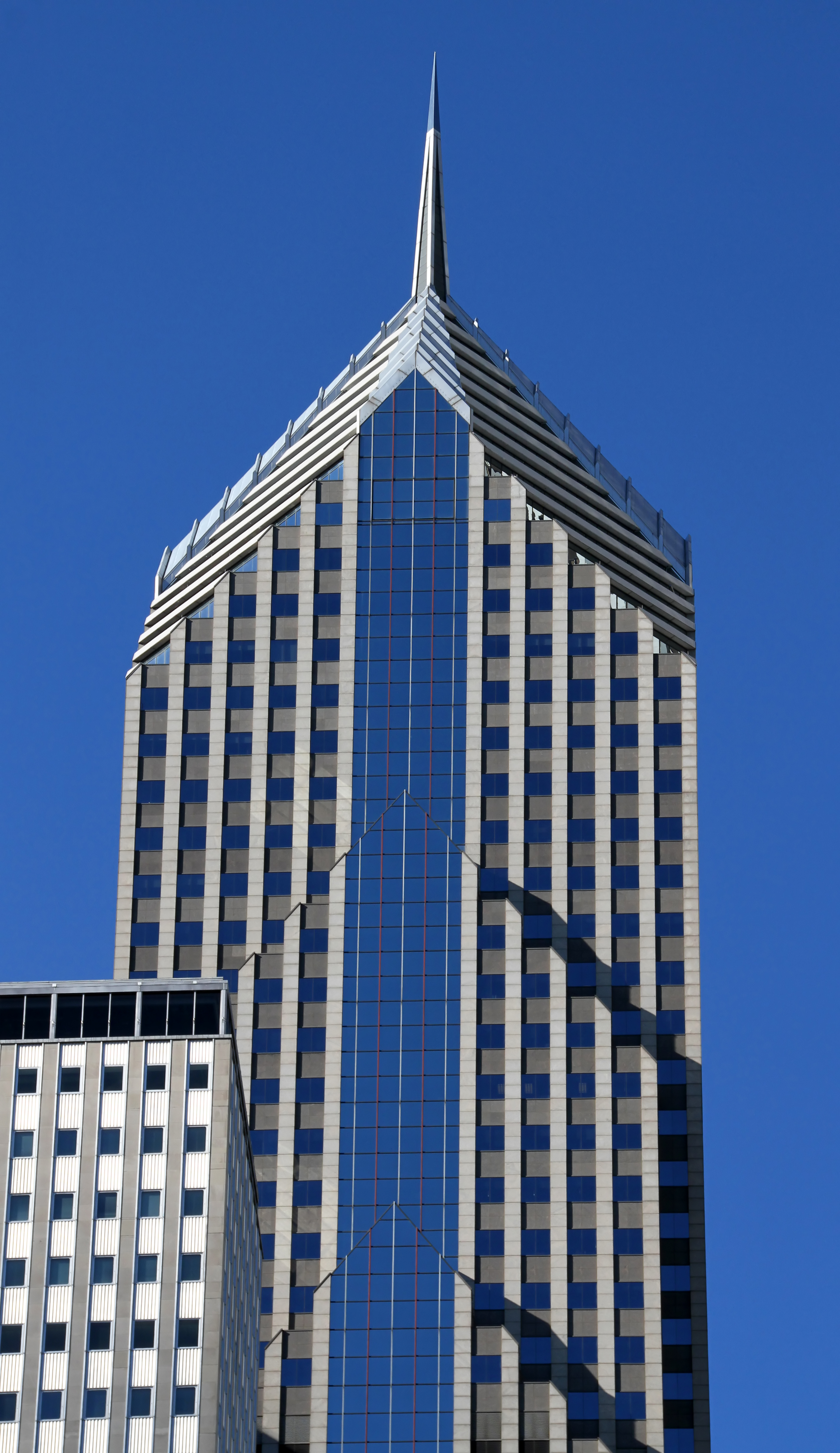
Building top in 2014

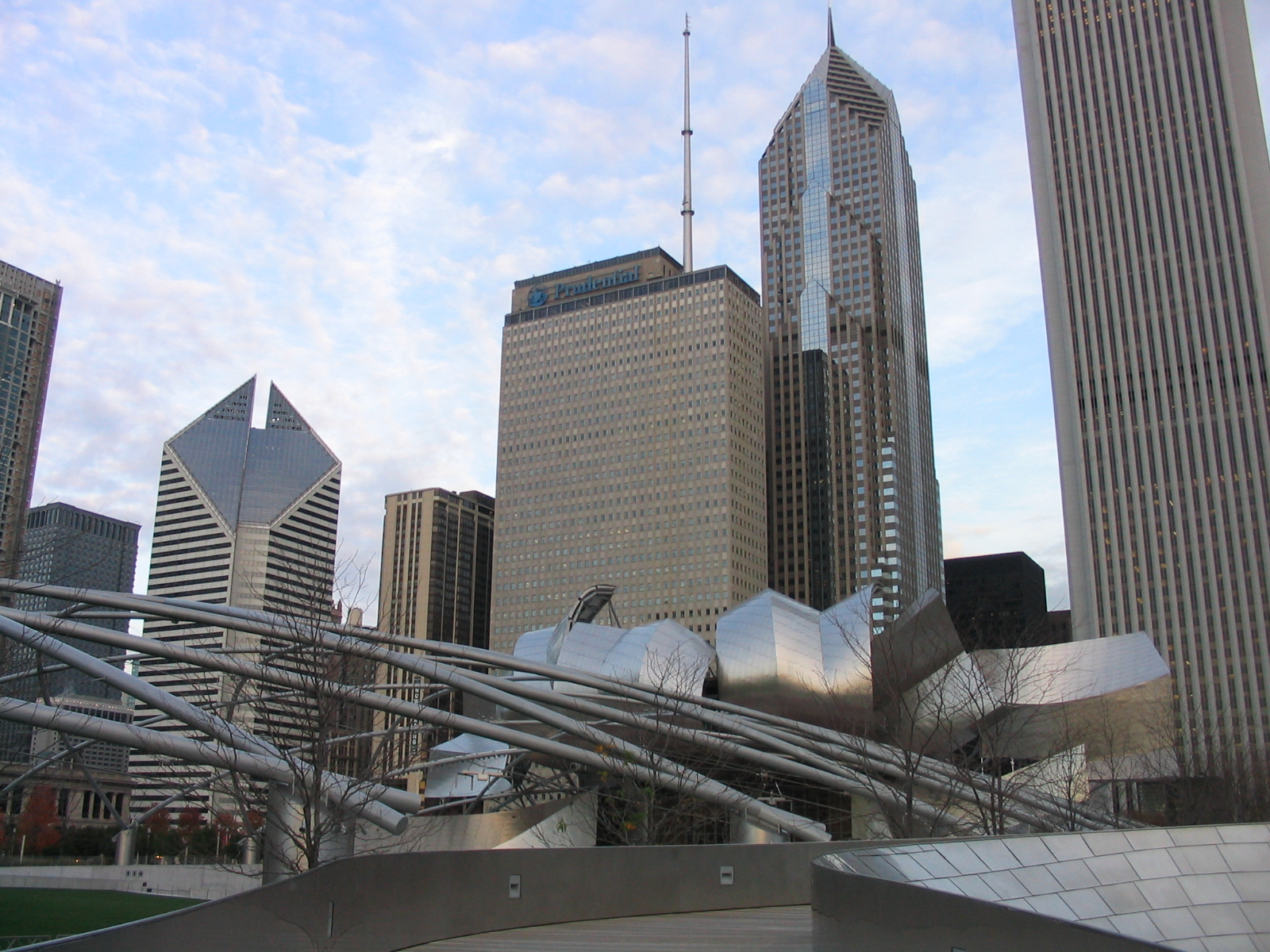
2004 with the Smurfit-Stone in foreground

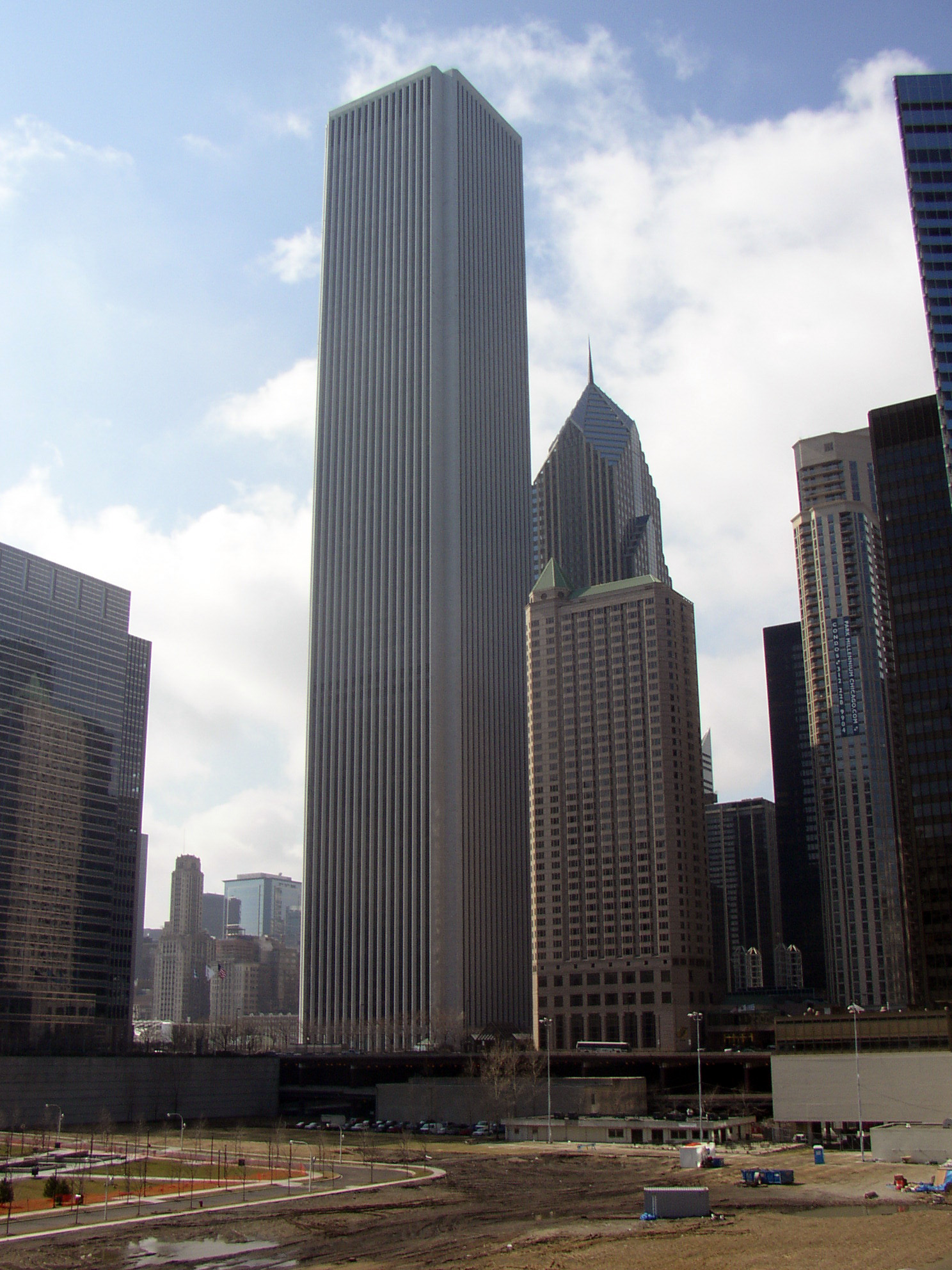
Aon Center

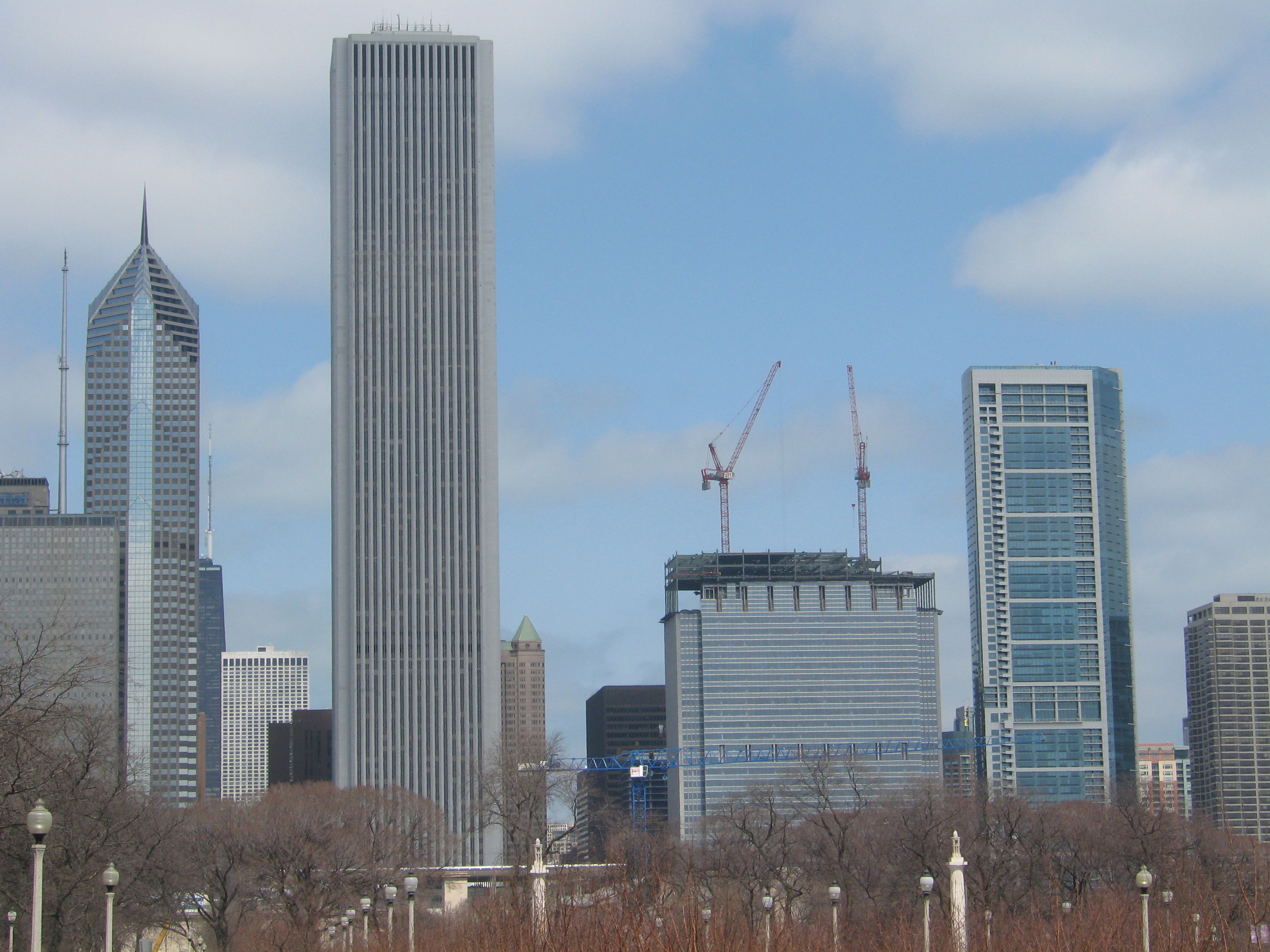
Grant Park North

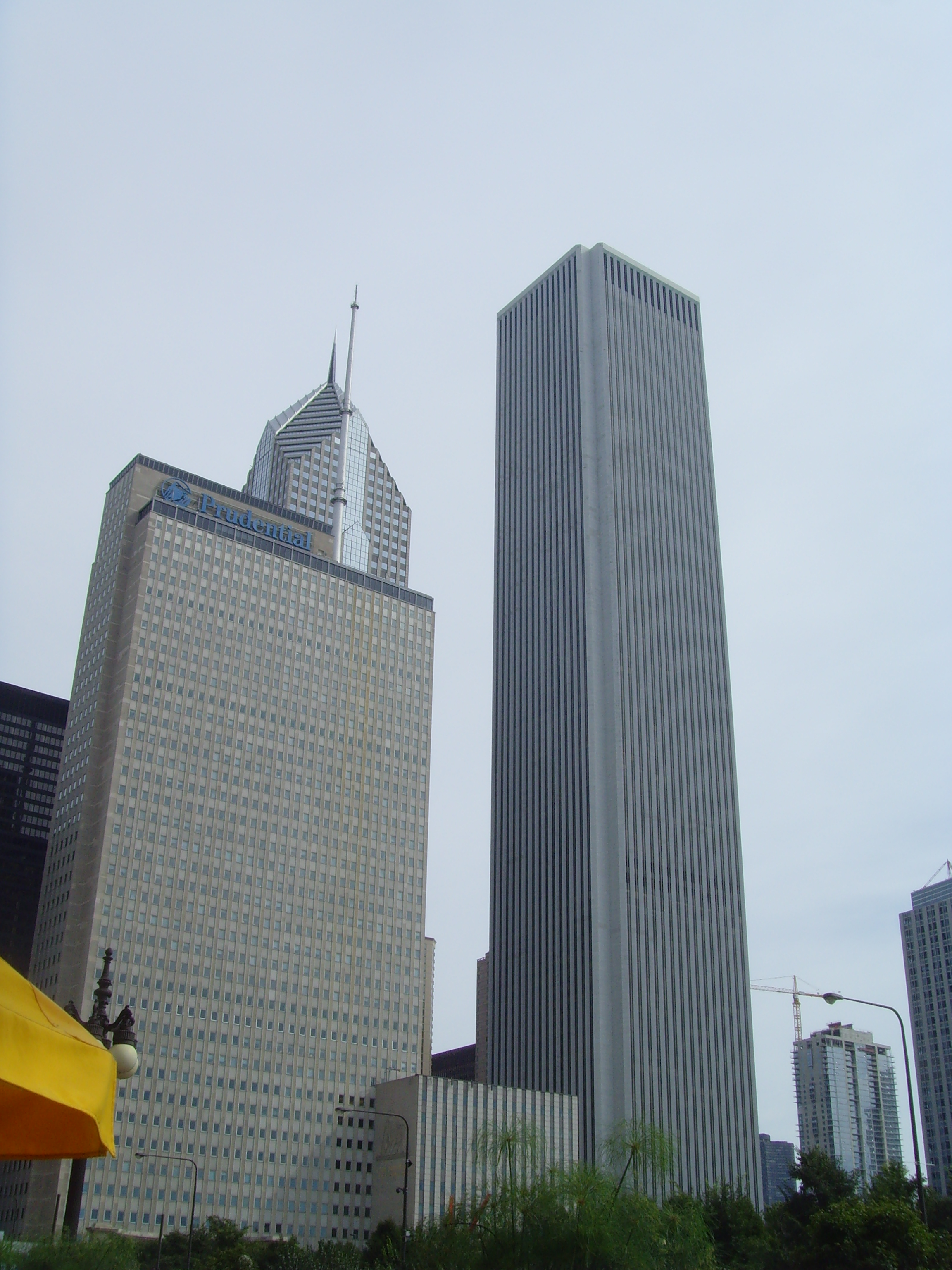
Three Chicago Towers

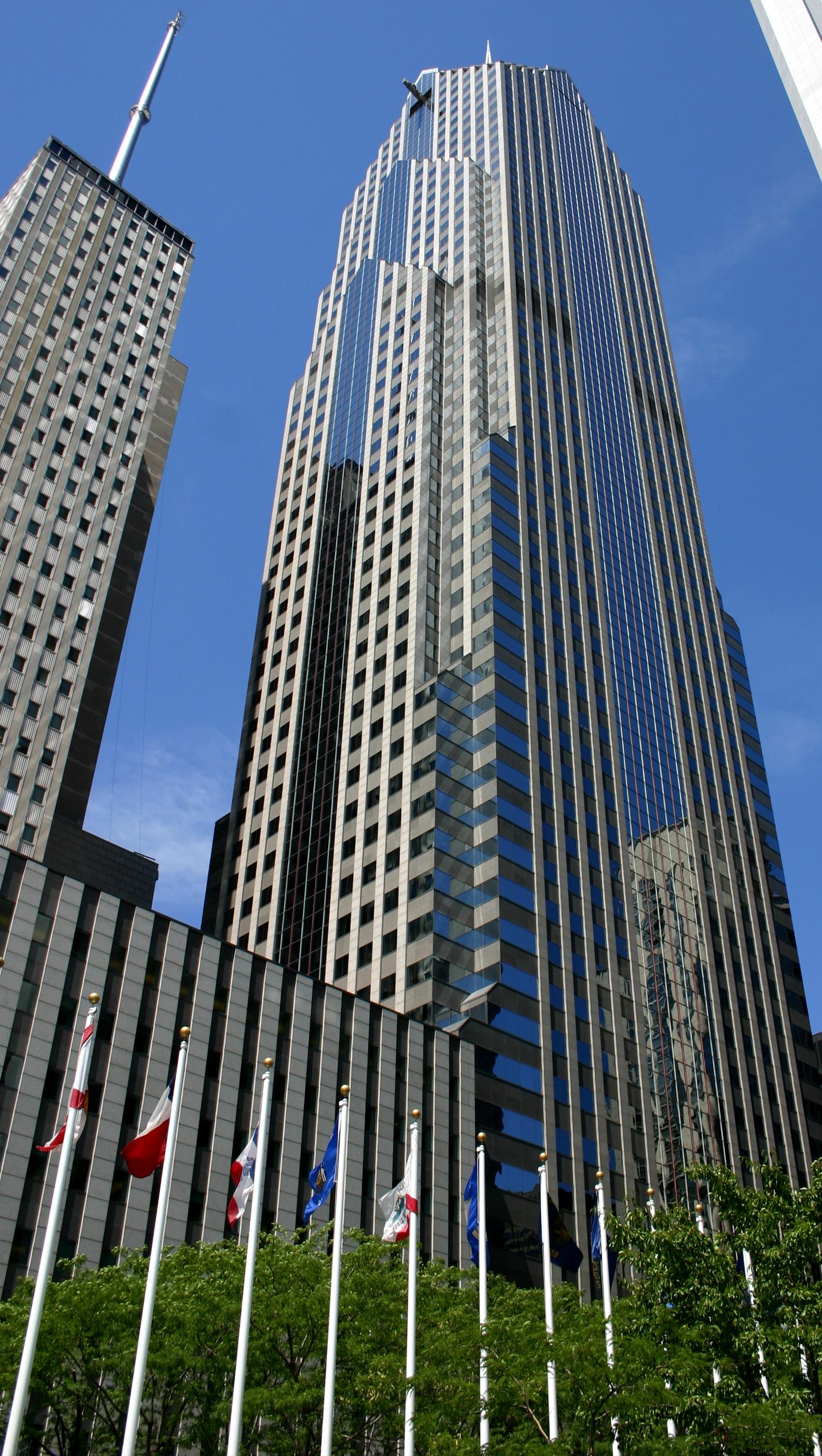
2006

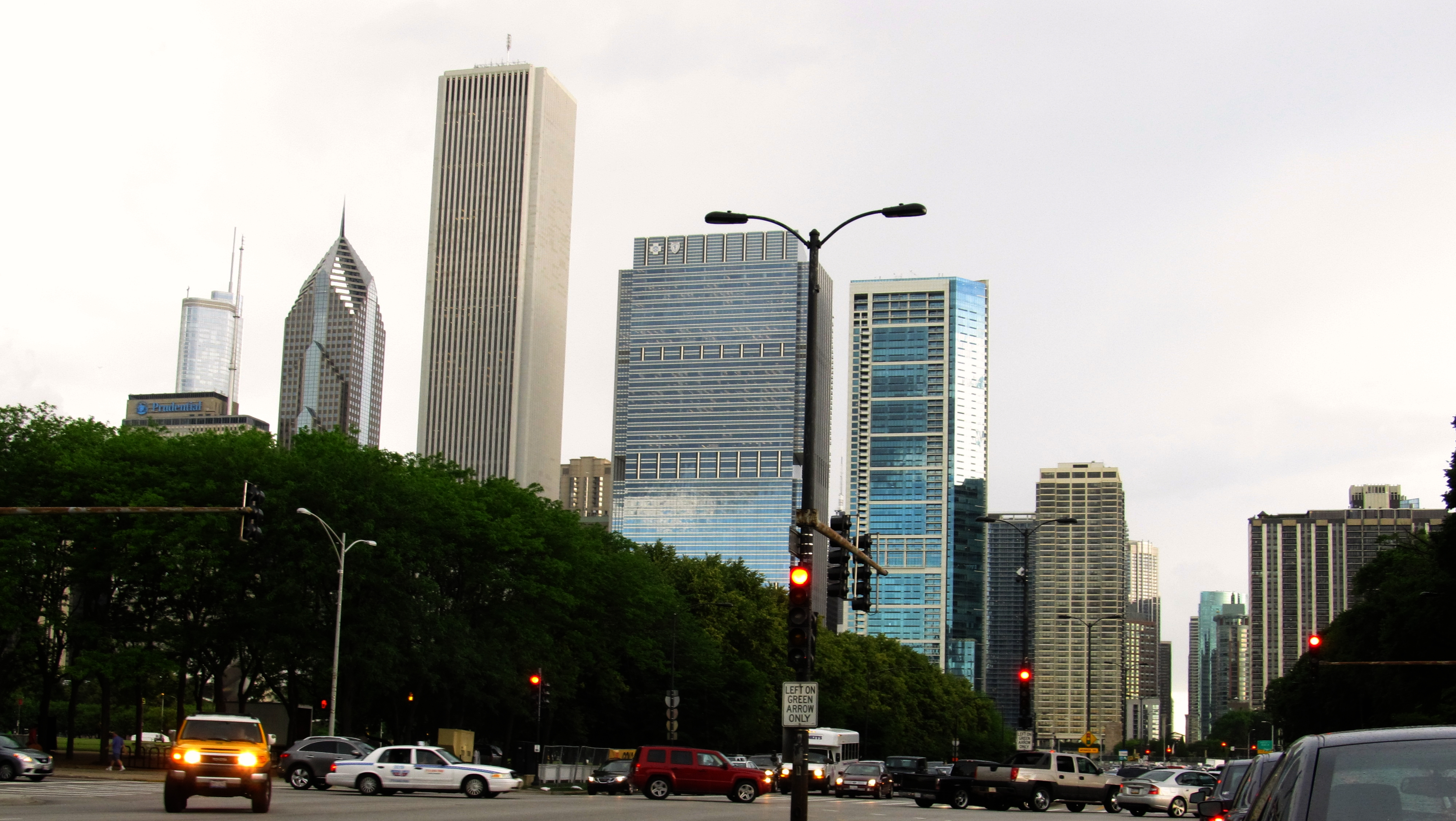
From Lake Shore Drive

== Position in Chicago's skyline ==
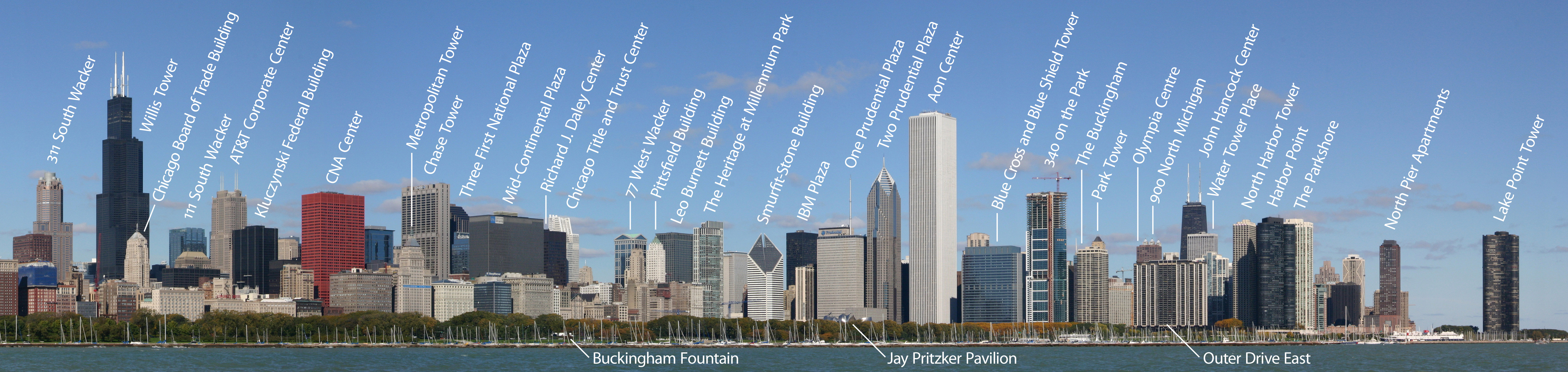

== See also ==
- List of buildings and structures
- List of tallest buildings
- List of tallest buildings in Chicago
- List of tallest buildings in the United States
- List of tallest buildings and structures
