= Triad (music magazine) =

Chicago music magazine Triad, 1973(?) - 1978(?)

cover of July, 1974 issue

Triad was a Chicago music magazine published monthly by the "underground" or free-form program Triad Radio, broadcast mainly on station WXFM, beginning around July 1971. Every month it contained a detailed listing of the programming for each day, as well as regular articles on astrology and reviews of records, concerts, books and film. It was available for free at most record stores in the greater Chicago area. Its last known issue was published in November of 1978.

"The eclectic Triad [radio] playlist included John Cage, Sun Ra, The Art Ensemble of Chicago, Albert Ayler, Kraftwerk, Alice Coltrane, Last Poets, Frank Zappa, Captain Beefheart, 13th Floor Elevators, King Crimson and Hawkwind, as well as lectures by such '70s icons as Alan Watts and Sri Chinmoy", and the magazine reflected that focus. By 1977, it contained 120 newsprint pages, and had a glossy cover. In September of 1977, as the radio programming changed broadcasting stations, the magazine separated itself and tried publishing biweekly for a few months. It also discontinued the program listings, but retained the astrology articles. In 1978, it became a newsprint tabloid, and was sponsored by radio station WKQX in Chicago.
