= Field Building (Chicago) =

Building in Chicago, Illinois

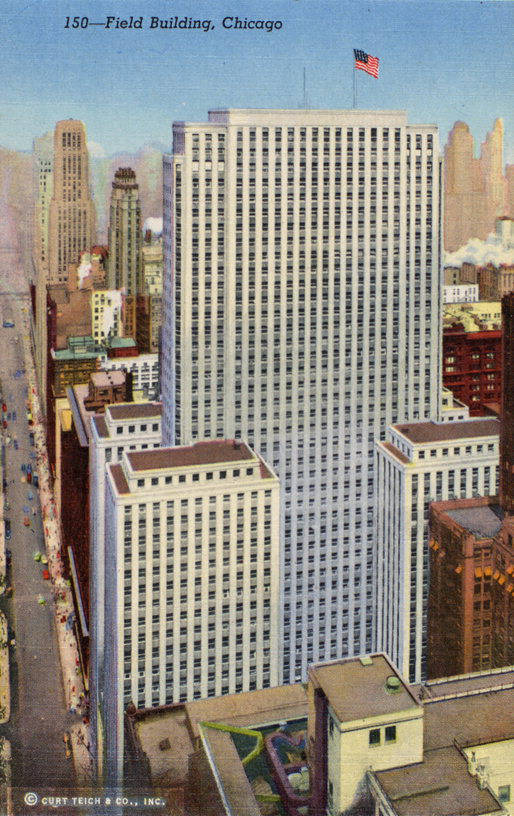

- Location in Chicago Location in Illinois Location in United States
- Alternative names: LaSalle National Bank Building; Bank of America Building

General information
- Location: Chicago, Illinois USA
- Coordinates: 41.8798°N 87.6316°W
- Construction started: 1931
- Completed: 1934

Height
- Roof: 535 ft (163.1 m)

Technical details
- Floor count: 45 total
- Floor area: 1,200,000 sq ft (110,000 m^{2})

Design and construction
- Architect: Graham, Anderson, Probst & White

Chicago Landmark
- Official name: Field Building
- Designated: February 9, 1994

The Field Building, also known as the LaSalle National Bank Building and Bank of America Building is an art deco office building at 135 South LaSalle Street in the Loop community area of Chicago, Illinois in the United States. The building was designated a Chicago Landmark February 9, 1994.

== History and description ==
The construction of the Field Building was completed 1934 as a 535 feet (163.1 m) 45-story skyscraper on the site bounded by South Clark Street, South LaSalle Street and West Adams Street. The architect was the firm of Graham, Anderson, Probst & White. It is considered the last major office building erected in Chicago prior to the Great Depression/World War II construction hiatus which ended with the building of One Prudential Plaza in 1955.

Many of the latest innovations such as high-speed elevators and air conditioning were incorporated into the building's design. The lobby features a multi-level arcade between LaSalle and Clark Streets allowing pedestrians to walk between the two streets and access the retail space without exiting the building. The elevator indicator panel and mailbox in the lobby are in an integrated design which resembles the building's exterior shape.

The building rises from a four-story base that covers the entire site. The exterior of the first story is faced in polished black granite. Windows are framed with polished aluminum or monel metal and have black and polished aluminum spandrel panels. The entrances on the east and west facades rise the entire height of the base and are also framed in black granite. Five pilasters faced in white Yule Marble separate the bays containing revolving doors that provide access to the lobby.

The upper stories are sheathed in limestone with windows grouped vertically and recessed to emphasize the building's height. The 45-story rectangular tower is centered on the base and buttressed by a shorter 22-story tower at each of its four corners.

Several buildings occupied this site until construction commenced in 1931. The world's first skyscraper, the Home Insurance Building (1885–1931), occupied the western portion facing LaSalle and Adams Streets. On December 7, 2004, a fire broke out on the 29th floor that also spread to the 30th floor; 25 people were injured.

== Utilization ==
Much of the building's rentable area was occupied by the LaSalle Bank, with the remainder occupied by various private tenants. In 2007, LaSalle Bank was sold by its European owner ABN AMRO to Bank of America and the building's name changed to the Bank of America Building. In August 2008, the Bank sold the building to AmTrust but continues to occupy 0.8 million square feet (74,000 m^{2}) of the 1.2 million square feet (110,000 m^{2}) in the building under a lease that runs through 2020. In April 2017, the bank announced it would relocate its offices to a new tower under development at 110 North Wacker.

Mechanical spaces are located at the 25th and 45th floor levels. The 43rd and 44th floors house executive dining rooms for use by the bank and selected other tenants, with a cafeteria located on the concourse level. The west side of the ground floor is utilized by Bank of America for retail banking, with the east side rented to merchants. The rest of the floors consist of typical office space. As was customary in the 1930s, the building does not have a 13th floor.

The 45th floor housed FM radio station WEFM. The station was owned by Zenith Radio Corporation. It broadcast classical music from 1940 to 1977. It subsequently played rock music.
