= Suzanne Le Mignot =

American television news anchor

Suzanne Le Mignot is a television news anchor and reporter for WBBM-TV in Chicago.

== Early life and education ==
Le Mignot earned a bachelor's degree with honors in mass communications from the University of South Florida in 1993.

== Professional career ==
Le Mignot began her broadcasting career while she was in college, working from 1989 until 1993 at the University of South Florida-owned, PBS-affiliated, WUSF-TV in Tampa, Florida as a production assistant and associate producer. She also worked as a news anchor and reporter at Radio & Television Serbia, Trecan Kanal, and RTV Studio B in Belgrade, Serbia from 1991 until 1992.

After college, Le Mignot joined WBBM radio in Chicago as a news anchor and reporter in 1994. In 1995, she joined WTMJ-AM in Milwaukee as an anchor-reporter. She also worked briefly as a news anchor at WGN-AM in Chicago before rejoining WBBM in late 1996.

Le Mignot began working for WBBM-TV as a free-lance reporter in 1995, and moved up to full-time status with the station (and therefore quit WBBM radio) in late 1999, when she became WBBM-TV's correspondent for Chicago's South Side and south suburbs. In 2000, Le Mignot became an early morning news anchor at WBBM-TV, a role she held until 2001, when she returned to dayside general assignment reporting duties.

In February 2002, the Chicago Sun-Times reported that Le Mignot's contract would not be renewed by WBBM-TV, and she briefly left the station. However, she signed a new contract in June 2002 and returned to the station.

In early 2006, Le Mignot became the weekend morning news anchor at WBBM-TV. She co-anchored with Mike Puccinelli until its cancellation in 2009. However, she was later reinstated to the weekend morning show in 2017, just 4 years after the newscast was revived. She also performs general assignment reporting during the week.

In 2007, WBBM-TV management considered promoting Le Mignot to being weekend evening news anchor. However, station bosses promoted Mai Martinez to the role instead.

== Awards ==
Le Mignot won an Associated Press award in 2007 for a piece she reported on the inability by commuter railroads' bomb-sniffing dogs to detect explosives. She also won local and national Emmy awards in 2008.

== Personal ==
Le Mignot lives in the Gold Coast area of Chicago with her daughter.
