= WUSN =

Country music radio station in Chicago

- Chicago, Illinois; United States
- Broadcast area: Chicago metropolitan area; Northwest Indiana
- Frequency: 99.5 MHz (HD Radio)
- Branding: US✶99

Programming
- Format: Country music

Ownership
- Owner: Audacy, Inc.; (Audacy License, LLC)
- Sister stations: WBBM; WBBM-FM; WCFS-FM; WSCR; WSCR-FM; WXRT

History
- First air date: February 2, 1940
- Former call signs: W51C (1940–1943); WWZR (1943–1946); WEFM (1946–1982)
- Call sign meaning: "US Ninety-nine" (frequency)

Technical information
- Licensing authority: FCC
- Facility ID: 28620
- Class: B
- ERP: 5,700 watts
- HAAT: 425 meters (1,394 ft)
- Transmitter coordinates: 41.899°N 87.623°W

Links
- Public license information: Public file; LMS
- Webcast: Listen live (via Audacy); Listen live (via iHeartRadio)
- Website: www.audacy.com/us99

WUSN (99.5 MHz) is a country music radio station in Chicago, Illinois. Owned by Audacy, Inc. and branded as "US✶99", it is based at Two Prudential Plaza in the Loop, and transmits from atop the John Hancock Center with an HD Radio signal.

== History ==
=== Founding and classical music era ===
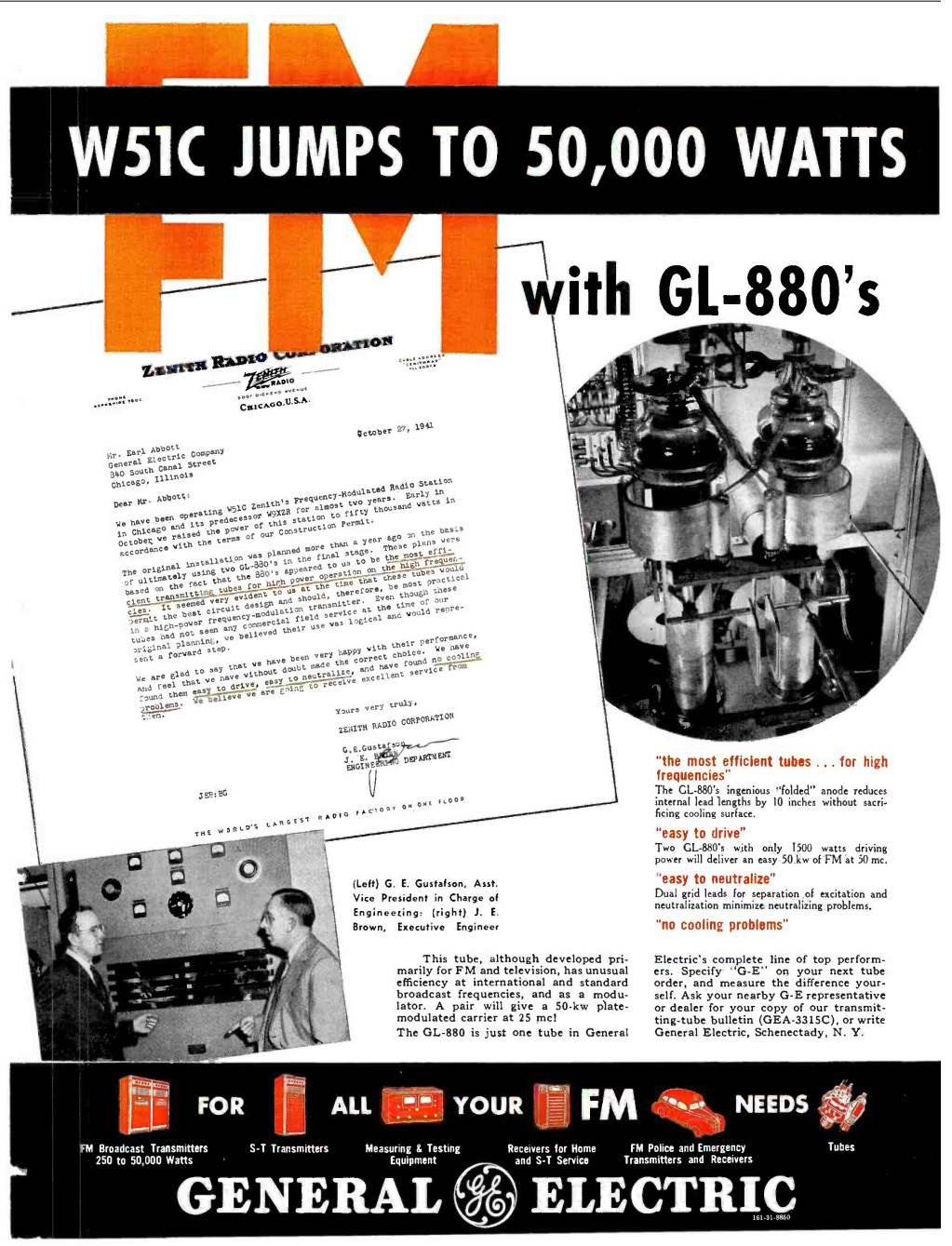
1942 General Electric advertisement featuring W51C.

The station began broadcasting on February 2, 1940, as experimental station W9XEN, licensed to Chicago-based radio/television manufacturer Zenith Radio Corporation. In May 1940, the Federal Communications Commission (FCC) announced the establishment, effective January 1, 1941, of an FM radio band operating on 40 channels spanning 42–50 MHz. On October 31, 1940, the first fifteen construction permits for commercial FM stations were issued, including one to Zenith for a station in Chicago at 45.1 MHz, which was issued the call sign W51C. It was one of the first FM stations in the United States, and is the country's oldest FM station still in operation. Its transmitter was located atop the Field Building.

Effective November 1, 1943, the FCC modified its policy for FM call letters, and the station was assigned new call letters of WWZR. In 1946, the station's call sign was changed to WEFM, which were the initials of Zenith president Eugene F. McDonald. On June 27, 1945, the FCC announced the reassignment of the FM band to 80 channels from 88–106 MHz, which was soon expanded to 100 channels from 88–108 MHz, and WEFM began broadcasting on 98.5 MHz, while temporarily continuing to also broadcast at 45.1 MHz. In 1947, the station's frequency was changed to 99.5 MHz.

From 1940, when the station began broadcasting, until February 1978, the station aired a classical music format. On June 1, 1961, WEFM became the second station in the United States to broadcast in FM stereo. Few advertisements were aired, and until 1966 the only advertisements were for Zenith products. In 1966, the station began to sell advertising time, though commercials were limited to five minutes per hour and the ads had to be compatible with WEFM's classical music format. In 1972, the transmitter was moved to the John Hancock Center.

=== General Cinema Corporation ownership ===
In the early 1970s Zenith agreed to sell WEFM to General Cinema Corporation, which intended to change the station's call letters to WICV (pseudo-Roman numerals for 99.5) and institute a rock format. Litigation delayed the sale and format change until February 1978. As part of the settlement to allow the station's sale, WEFM's classical music library was donated to WNIB and WBEZ. General Cinema converted the station to a top 40 format with program director Brian White and afternoon drive personality Don Cox, but decided not to change the call sign. The station was branded "We-FM" and initially broadcast from the studios used by the Zenith classical music format at 120 West Madison street in the Chicago loop. General Cinema moved studios to the 13th floor of the Hancock Center at 875 N. Michigan Ave in 1980, where the transmitter resides on the 93rd floor. The station leased a 67 kHz subcarrier to the Physicians Radio Network, a news service for medical doctors. In early 1981, the station adopted a MOR format, with programming from the syndicated Schulke II package.

The WEFM call sign is now used on 95.9 FM in nearby Michigan City, Indiana, which also is imaged as "We-FM."

=== US✶99 ===
In 1982, the station was purchased by First Media Corporation for $9.2 million. On February 6, 1982, the station adopted a country music format, branded "US-99", and its call sign was changed to WUSN on February 25, 1982. The station's initial promotion was that four songs would be played before any commercial break ensued, and that $25,000 would be given to the first person to call if the guarantee was not fulfilled. Within the first week, two mistakes were noticed by listeners and $50,000 was given away.

Lee Logan was hired as program director from KFMK in Houston, remaining with the station until 1987, when he departed for KLAC in Los Angeles. From 1982 to 1985, Don Wade was the station's morning host. Wade was briefly midday host on the station, before moving to WLS. Shock-Jock Gary Dee replaced Wade as morning host in 1985, but was fired a year later.

The station's initial country music competitors in Chicago were 670 WMAQ, 104.3 WJEZ, and 1160 WJJD, which switched to the adult standards Music of Your Life format within weeks of "US-99"'s debut. In years when the station lacked major local competition, it has ranked as the nation's most-listened-to country station.

In 1993, Infinity Broadcasting bought WUSN. Infinity was acquired by the parent company of CBS in 1997.

On August 8, 2016, WUSN rebranded slightly as "US✶99", dropping the .5 from their moniker and unveiling a new logo and slogan, "Chicago's Hottest Country". The traditional five-pointed star, which is a common feature of the logos of American country music radio stations representing the Flag of the United States, was changed in the new version to the six-pointed variety represented in the acclaimed Flag of Chicago, with the logo coloring following suit using the flag's light blue and red.

On February 2, 2017, CBS Radio announced it would merge with Entercom. The merger was approved on November 9, 2017, and was consummated on the 17th.

==== Awards ====
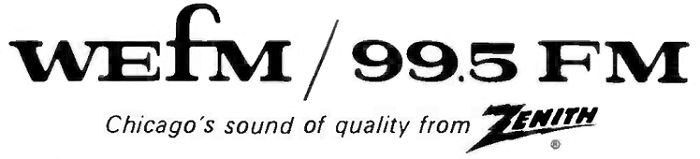
WEFM's logo as a classical station

In 1967, WEFM won the National Federation of Music Clubs' "Special 4-Star Award" for "outstanding programming devoted to American composers".

WUSN won the Country Music Association's Large Market Station of the Year in 1993 and the Major Market Station of the Year award in 2006. It won Major Market Station of the Year from the Academy of Country Music in 2015.

In 2005, WUSN host Lisa Dent won the Country Music Association's Major Market Personality of the Year award.

In 2010 and 2011, the station won Country Radio Broadcasters/Country Aircheck Awards for Station of the Year for a Major Market; the Lisa Dent and Ramblin' Ray Show for Major Market Morning Show and Marci Braun (weeknight host/MD) for Major Market MD.

In 2010 and 2015, Lisa Dent and Ramblin' Ray Stevens won the Country Music Association Major Market Personality of the Year for the Lisa Dent and Ramblin' Ray Morning Show.

==== Controversy ====
On April 13, 2001, a memo from WUSN management asking on-air station employees to attend the George Strait Country Music Festival on May 26, 2001, at their own expense and "work the crowd" on behalf of the station was leaked to Robert Feder's media column for the Chicago Sun-Times.

On July 7, 2003, country music radio personality Cliff Dumas sued Infinity Broadcasting Corporation and WUSN in United States District Court, seeking monetary damages. Dumas alleged that station management had induced him to resign gainful employment at a New Mexico radio station to take a job which was offered but then never materialized.
