= Eddie & JoBo =

American radio personalities

Ed Volkman and Joseph "Bohannan" E. Colborn or more commonly known by their on-air names Eddie & JoBo, were radio personalities in Chicago, Illinois. The duo are best known for their 26-year run at WBBM-FM, known on-air as B96, for 24 years from 1984 to 2008. They were fired from B96 in 2008 and were hired by WLS-AM as Saturday night talk show hosts in 2010. On March 10, 2011, it was announced that the duo would be returning to the CBS Radio Chicago cluster as the morning show on the new 104.3 K-HITS starting March 14, 2011. It was announced on December 6, 2012, Eddie & JoBo had their last day on 104.3 KHiTs. Subsequently, the two enjoyed a brief stint at WLS-AM as weekend hosts but had not worked together on-air until a one-time reunion on B96 in 2024.

Eddie is the son of Harry Volkman, a longtime meteorologist at Chicago television stations WBBM and WFLD. He served as the morning drive host on WSSR from 2019 to 2026 while JoBo retired from radio in 2013; he died on November 24, 2025 at the age of 70.

== History ==
Joe Bohannon first signed on at WBBM-FM, known on-air as B96, in 1984 hosting an evening show as "JoBo In Chicago". Ed Volkman started at B96 in 1986 hosting the morning show along with Karen Hand and Mike Elston. Elston left B96 in 1988 and Bohannon was moved to mornings along with Volkman and Hand; the creation of "Eddie & JoBo".

The duo enjoyed success in the late 1980s and early 1990s. They invited their listeners, who they dubbed "The World's Most Dangerous Audience", to assist in pranks such as cold water wake-up calls, the daily Twinkie check, and mattress attacks. Eddie & JoBo rode a wave of success, but on May 10, 1994, they were fired in the aftermath of a multimillion-dollar defamation lawsuit filed against them by former WMAQ-TV News anchor Joan Esposito. Esposito sued Eddie & JoBo in 1993 after JoBo falsely aired a statement that she had been impregnated by a member of the Chicago Bulls. Esposito eventually won a public apology and $1 million.

It was then that B96 decided to move the morning drive in a new direction, asking the listeners to “choose” the new morning drive in what was known as “The B96 Morning Show Open Auditions” which ran through the summer of 1994. Terry Jacobs and Bill Cody were chosen by the listeners to be the successors of Eddie & JoBo. However, very few people warmed up to “T.J. & Wild Bill” and the number of listeners dropped when compared to Eddie & JoBo's show.

Caving in to pressure from a campaign led by former co-workers and former on-air host Karen Hand, plus many phone calls and letters sent by Eddie & JoBo loyalists, B96 announced on December 12, 1996, that Eddie & JoBo had been re-hired, and would be returning to host the morning drive along with Frankie “Hollywood” Rodriguez starting January 13, 1997, from 5–8 am.

B96 began to see significant improvements in their morning drive ratings as the combo “Eddie & JoBo And Frankie” show and “Private Lives” slowly crept its way up the ratings. Afraid of another possible lawsuit, station management stepped in to exert more control over the show. They made on-air staff changes and imposed a taped delay, at times as long as 20 minutes. Every word spoken by the duo was closely monitored and had to be approved by a member of management prior to airing. In addition, a member of management had to be in the studio with Eddie & JoBo at all times or they could not broadcast.

Eddie & JoBo adapted to the changes, and ratings continued to climb back to their former glory. Private Lives was dropped from morning drive in 1999 and Eddie & JoBo hosted from 5–10am under tight restrictions until May 29, 2002. Rival station WKSC-FM 103.5 made an offer to them to do morning drive unrestricted on their station. B96 pulled the show as a negotiation tactic in the hopes of keeping the show. Negotiations continued until July when B96 announced that Eddie & JoBo signed on with the station in a 7-year, $21 million deal that began immediately. Also, B96 agreed to drop all restrictions on the show.

Eddie & JoBo resumed a live show on July 22, 2002. However, the show began to see a marked decline in ratings. Many attributed this to the station's overall severe decline in ratings ever since dropping its heavy dance music format for an all hip-hop & rap format in the late 1990s. Ever since abandoning dance music, B96 witnessed a steady decline from #1 in 1998, all the way down to #9, and even lower in recent years.

On November 21, 2008, Eddie, JoBo and Erica were relieved of their morning show duties.

Following Eddie and JoBo's yearlong stint at WJMK-FM in Chicago, following the station's revamped "K-HITS" branding, the two's career remained dormant for several years before a possible resurgence in 2014. In June 2014, it was announced that a deal at WLS-FM for the two DJs was in the works, with the final stages of the contract being laid out and possibilities being up in the air. However, at the last minute, JoBo opted out of the contract, resulting in the station not wanting just Eddie to hold the position and the offer was terminated. The two assured the split was amicable and both remained friends.

Both Eddie and JoBo served as the spokesmen for United Auto Insurance, a Chicago-based insurance company. On April 1, 2024, they returned to B96 to promote a freestyle music event they were hosting at the Rosemont Theatre.

As of 2026, Eddie was the morning drive show on WSSR from 2019 until his layoff in September 2026, and hosted the morning show on WFXF from 2018 to 2019. JoBo retired from radio and died at his home in Freeport, Illinois, on November 24, 2025, at the age of 70.

== Career at WLS AM ==
After being fired in November 2008, Facebook groups were made petitioning for Eddie & JoBo to be put back on the air. B96 still aired the United Auto Insurance radio commercials until their contract expired. Months later, they served as fill-in personalities on the WLS-AM weekday talk show The Roe Conn Show. This led to their hiring by WLS as Saturday night hosts. Their show aired every Saturday night from 7-9pm, occasionally 9:30pm-Midnight. The show was dubbed "Eddie and Jobo's Saturday Night Talk Party," but was cancelled in 2012.

== CDs ==
B96 has released CDs from its many DJs and "mixmasters", the most notable being Too Kool Kris. Eddie, JoBo, and B96 released 2 CDs titled Eddie & JoBo Funny Songs Vol. 1 and Eddie & JoBo Funny Songs Vol. 2. However, these CDs did not contain just songs, regardless of the fact that Eddie & JoBo had made enough songs to do so.

Funny Songs Vol. 1 came out in 2001, in the Chicago area stores. It was released by MCA Records and sold at area stores. It was an enhanced computer CD and included parodies of songs by Backstreet Boys, Enrique Iglesias, The Outhere Brothers, Ohio Players, Reality and others.

== Funny Songs Vol. 1 Track Listing ==
1. Intro
2. Sammy Sosa
3. Psycho Shower
4. Jazz Boys
5. Mrs. Pillafuff's Answering Machine Message
6. Boom Boom Valpo
7. Mrs. Pillafuff Searches For NSYNC Tickets
8. Another Bite
9. Marge McDouche's Answering Machine Message
10. Tonya
11. Marge McDouche's Crab Love Test!
12. Buy More Clothes
13. Quit Blowing Fumes From Cigars
14. Backstreet Boys Interview (Part 1)
15. Backstreet Boys Interview (Part 2)
16. Backstreet Boys Interview (Part 3)
17. Backstreet Boys Interview (Part 4)
18. Eddie & JoBo's Christmas Song

Other songs by Eddie & JoBo "Ken Doll" (parody of "Barbie Girl" by Aqua), "Dumber Girls" (parody of "Summer Girls" by LFO) and "Man, I Feel Like a Man!" (parody of "Man, I feel like a Woman" by Shania Twain).
