= One Prudential Plaza =

Office skyscraper in Chicago, Illinois

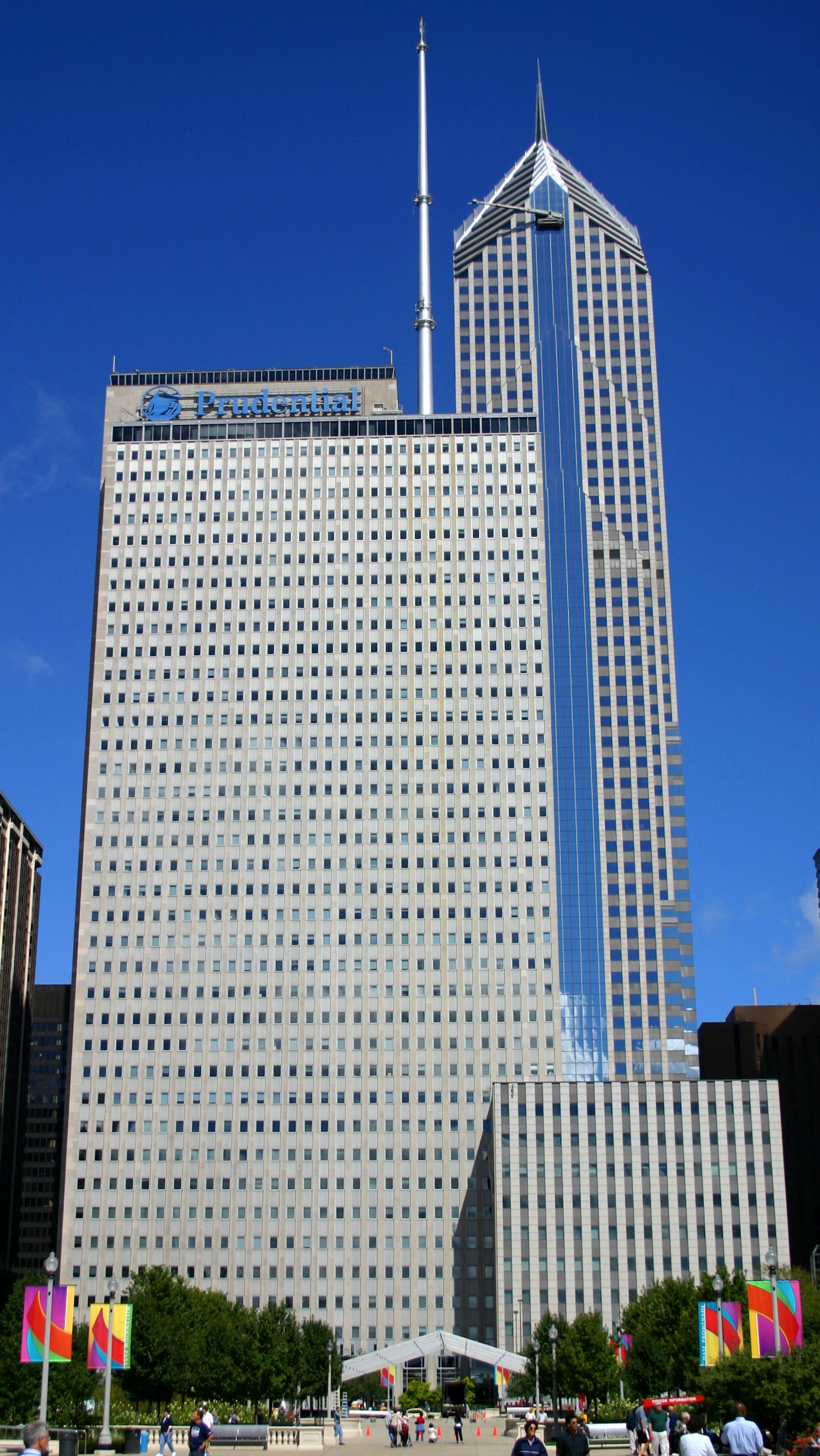
- One Prudential Plaza with Two Prudential Plaza towering behind
- Interactive map of the One Prudential Plaza area
- Former names: Prudential Building

General information
- Status: Completed
- Location: 130 E. Randolph St. Chicago, Illinois; United States
- Coordinates: 41.8849°N 87.6233°W
- Completed: 1955

Height
- Antenna spire: 912 ft (278 m)
- Roof: 601 ft (183 m)

Technical details
- Floor count: 41
- Floor area: 1,762,989 ft^{2} (163,787.0 m^{2})

Design and construction
- Architects: Naess & Murphy
- Structural engineer: Naess & Murphy
- Main contractor: George A. Fuller Co.

One Prudential Plaza (formerly known as the Prudential Building) is a 41-story structure in Chicago completed in 1955 as the headquarters for Prudential's Mid-America company. It was the first skyscraper built in Chicago since the Great Depression of the 1930s and the Second World War. The plaza, including a second building erected in 1990, is owned by BentleyForbes and a consortium of New York investors, since the Great Recession of the early 21st century.

== History of construction ==
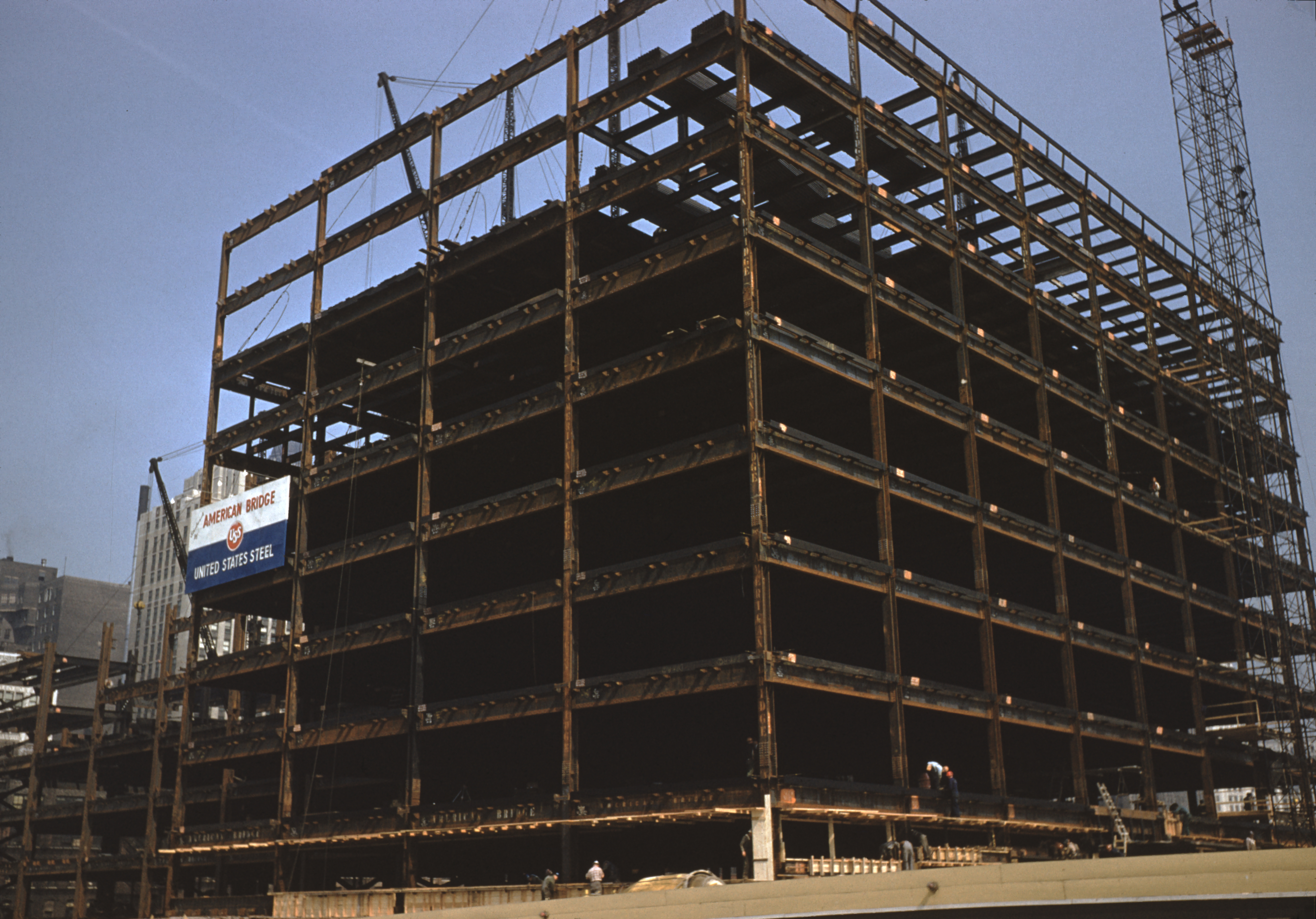
The structure being built in the 1950s

The structure was significant as the first new downtown skyscraper constructed in Chicago since the Field Building, 21 years earlier and was built on air rights over the Illinois Central Railroad. It was the last building ever connected to the Chicago Tunnel Company's tunnel network. When the Prudential was finished it had the highest roof in Chicago with only the statue of Ceres on the Chicago Board of Trade higher. Its mast served as a broadcasting antenna for Chicago's WGN-TV. The architect was Naess & Murphy, a precursor to C.F. Murphy & Associates and later Murphy/Jahn Architects.

The building originally hosted two restaurants. Stouffer's Gibraltar Room was located off the lobby, and Stouffer's Top of the Rock was on the 41st floor, with views of four states. But as other, higher, buildings were erected around it, the restaurants lost business, Top of the Rock closing in 1976, and the Gibraltar Room in 1982.

== Later purchase ==
In May 2006, BentleyForbes, a Los Angeles-based real estate investment firm run by Frederick Wehba and his family, purchased One Prudential Plaza, along with its sister property, Two Prudential Plaza for $470 million.

After a default on the mortgage encumbering the towers during the Great Recession of the early 21st century, New York-based investors 601W Companies and Berkley Properties took control of the towers after investing more than $100 million in equity to recapitalize. BentleyForbes, the prior controlling owner of the towers, continues to have an interest in the owning partnership.

== Tenants ==
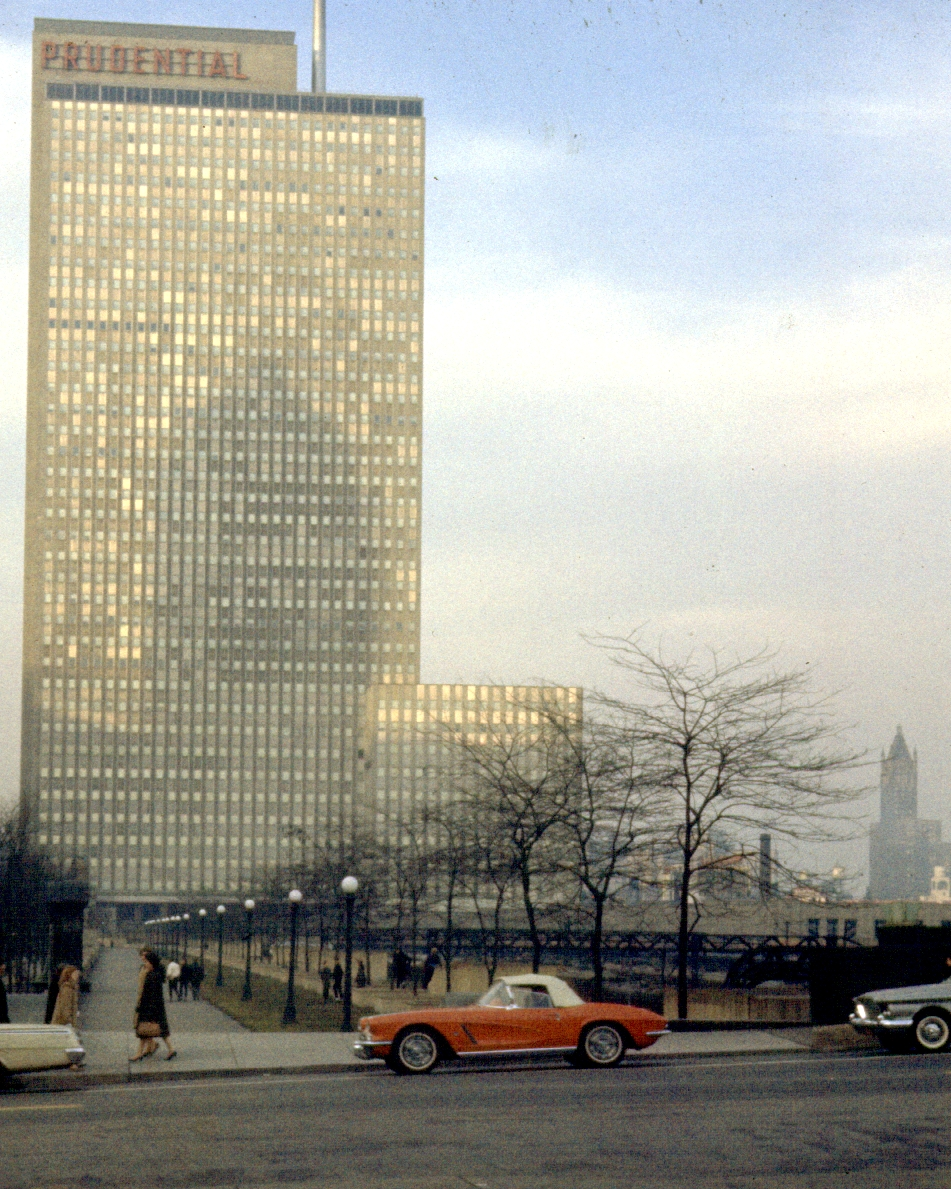
in 1964

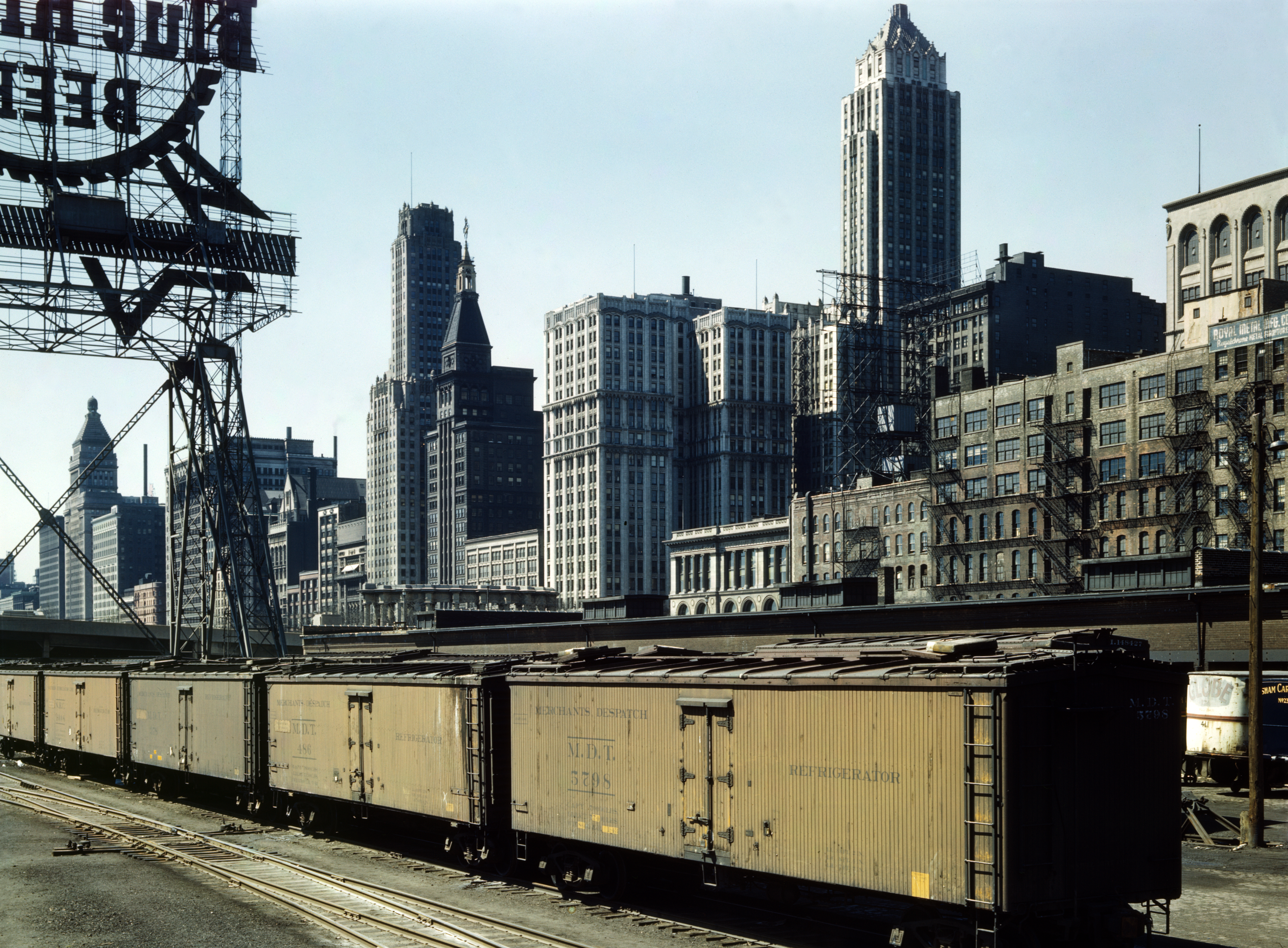
1943 view from One Prudential Plaza location

- Chicago Federation of Labor
- Society of Women Engineers — Global Headquarters, 35th Floor
- American Institute of Steel Construction
- Wilson Sporting Goods
- Hillrom Corporate Headquarters
- Marketing Werks
- Cision
- Conversion Alliance
- No Limit Agency
- McGraw Hill (Education And Test Prep Editorial)
- Vanderbilt Office Properties
- Envisionit Agency
- S&P Global Ratings
- Bowman, Barrett & Associates Inc.
- OppLoans
- Hubbard Chicago
- Painters District Council 14
- Optiver

The building was the home of the Chicago Tribune and Tribune Publishing after leaving Tribune Tower in July 2018 until January, 2021.

== See also ==
- List of buildings and structures
- List of tallest buildings in Chicago
- List of tallest buildings in the United States
- List of tallest buildings in the world
- World's tallest structures

== Position in Chicago's skyline ==
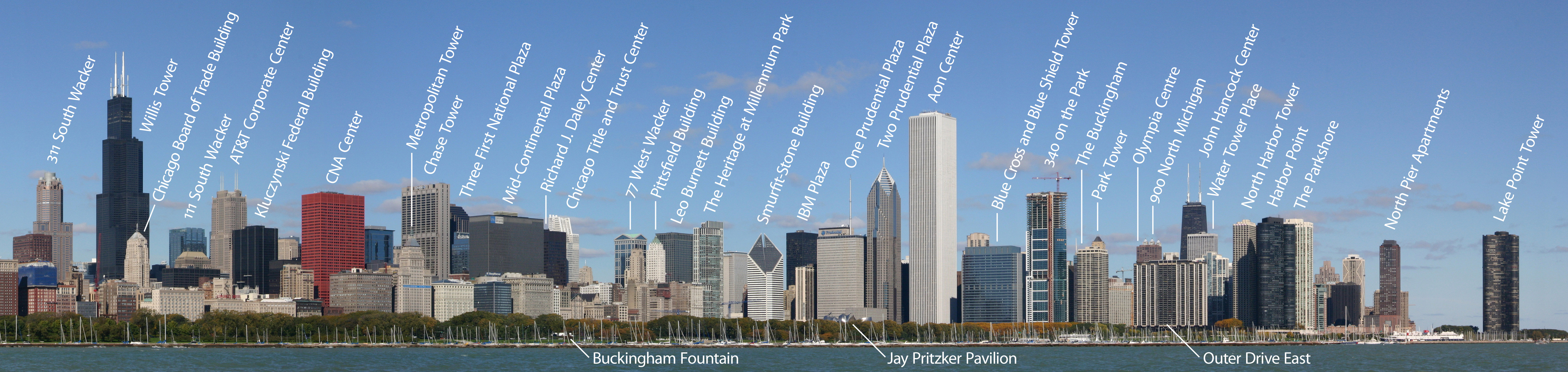
