= John D. Cruickshank =

Canadian journalist and media executive

John D. Cruickshank (born c.1953) is a Canadian newspaper publisher, broadcasting executive, journalist, and diplomat. He is the current Canadian Consulate-General, Chicago, a position he has held since March 2017. He was formerly the chief operating officer and publisher of the Chicago Sun-Times, publisher of the Toronto Star; managing editor of The Globe and Mail, and editor-in-chief of the Vancouver Sun.

== Life and career ==
Cruisckshank was born in Toronto and graduated from the University of Toronto with a degree in English literature. He began his career as a journalist for The Kingston Whig-Standard in Kingston, Ontario, followed by a position with the Montreal Gazette. He served as the managing editor of The Globe and Mail and editor-in-chief of the Vancouver Sun before leaving Canada for the United States in 2000 to take the post of vice president of editorial affairs at the Chicago Sun-Times. In that position, he ran the newsroom until 2003, when he succeeded F. David Radler as chief operating officer and publisher of the paper following Radler's ousting due to corruption charges in the Black and Radler scandal. In 2004, he publicly revealed a circulation scam by the Chicago Sun-Times that had been on-going for years under its previous leadership. His revelation, while damaging to the newspaper's relationships with advertisers and the public, earned him a reputation for high integrity. He stepped down from his position at the Chicago Sun-Times in 2007 to take a position with the Canadian Broadcasting Corporation as the head publisher of English-language content for television, radio, and online media.

From 2008 through 2016, Cruickshank served as the publisher of the Toronto Star. He also served as co-chair of Canadian Press Enterprises and chairman of the Canadian Journalism Foundation. In 2017, he succeeded Canadian diplomat Roy Norton as the Canadian Consulate-General, Chicago.

Cruickshank is married to S. Jennifer Hunter, an established journalist who also worked for the Chicago Sun-Times, along with positions at Maclean's Magazine, the Globe and Mail and the Montreal Gazette. Their two children attended the University of Chicago and are now both working in the U.S., one in Chicago, the other in New York.
