= WBBM (AM) =

Radio station in Chicago, Illinois

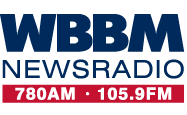
- Chicago, Illinois; United States
- Broadcast area: Chicago metropolitan area
- Frequency: 780 kHz
- Branding: Newsradio 105.9 WBBM

Programming
- Format: All-news radio
- Affiliations: ABC News Radio; Bloomberg Radio; WBBM-TV

Ownership
- Owner: Audacy, Inc.; (Audacy License, LLC)
- Sister stations: WBBM-FM; WCFS-FM; WSCR; WSCR-FM; WUSN; WXRT

History
- First air date: February 6, 1924
- Call sign meaning: None (sequentially assigned), but founder Frank Atlass announced that they stood for "We Broadcast Better Music"

Technical information
- Licensing authority: FCC
- Facility ID: 9631
- Class: A
- Power: 45,000 watts (day); 43,000 watts (night)
- Transmitter coordinates: 41°56′3.11″N 88°4′22.25″W (main); 41°56′18″N 87°45′5″W (aux)
- Repeater: 105.9 WCFS-FM (Elmwood Park)

Links
- Public license information: Public file; LMS
- Webcast: Listen live (via Audacy)
- Website: www.audacy.com/wbbm780

WBBM (780 kHz) – branded Newsradio 105.9 WBBM – is a commercial all-news AM radio station licensed to serve Chicago, Illinois. Owned by Audacy, Inc., its studios are located at Two Prudential Plaza in the Chicago Loop, while the station's transmitter—diplexed with sister station WSCR—is in the nearby suburb of Bloomingdale.

WBBM is a Class A station that broadcasts on a clear-channel AM frequency, powered with 45,000 watts by day and 43,000 watts at night, using a non-directional antenna. Its daytime signal provides at least grade B coverage to most of the northern two-thirds of Illinois (as far south as Springfield) as well as large portions of Wisconsin, Iowa, Michigan and Indiana. Its city-grade coverage reaches as far north as Milwaukee. At night, WBBM can be heard across much of North America under favorable conditions, but is strongest in the Midwest.

In addition to a standard analog transmission, WBBM is simulcast over WCFS-FM (105.9), and is available online via Audacy.

== Programming ==
The most-common program on WBBM is a live rolling news cycle that begins at the top of each hour, structured into segments of news, traffic, weather, sports, and business updates from Bloomberg Radio. The scheduling of these segments is similar to that of several co-owned all-news stations including KNX in Los Angeles, KCBS in San Francisco and WWJ in Detroit. This news cycle can be interrupted for breaking local or national news events that necessitate longer-form coverage.

WBBM is the Chicago affiliate station for the Notre Dame Fighting Irish football team.

Other programs featured on WBBM include: Noon Business Hour; At Issue, public affairs interviews with Craig Dellimore; CBS News Weekend Roundup; old-time radio program When Radio Was; audio portions of 60 Minutes and Face the Nation.

WBBM broadcasts 60-second light segments throughout the day, such as Real Estate Feature, Made in Chicago, Innovation Minute, Eating Right, among others. These segments are also available as podcasts. On-air staff includes: Cisco Cotto, Keith Johnson, Nick Young, Lisa Fielding, Bernie Tafoya, Mai Martinez, Andy Dahn, Rachel Pierson, Nancy Harty and Rob Hart.

== History ==
=== Early years ===
WBBM was first licensed on January 31, 1924, to the Frank Atlass Produce Company at 110 Park Place in Lincoln, Illinois. The station's primary founder, 29-year-old Harry Leslie "Les" Atlass, had extensive earlier radio experience. In 1911, he had reportedly constructed a simple spark transmitter set. Three years later, his then 11-year-old younger brother, Ralph, constructed an apparently unlicensed amateur radio station at the family home, that was described as "chief wireless station" of the newly formed Lincoln United Wireless Association.

With the April 1917 entrance of the United States into World War I the federal government took full control of the radio industry, and it became illegal for civilians to operate radio transmitters and receivers. After the conclusion of the war, the civilian radio restrictions were lifted. Les Atlass' continuing interest in radio led in mid-1923 to his obtaining a license to operate an amateur radio station, 9DFC.

Although the original spark radio transmitters were only capable of producing the dots-and-dashes of Morse code, the development of vacuum tube transmitters made audio transmissions practical. In the early 1920s, this led to the introduction of organized broadcasting, and by the end of 1922, over 500 broadcast stations were operating in the United States. Amateur radio stations were not permitted to make broadcasts intended for the general public. However, during April 1923, Les Atlass, in conjunction with the Lincoln Courier newspaper, broadcast local election results over 9DFC, claiming as a technicality that instead of a prohibited public broadcast, he was merely transmitting information to a second amateur, which by chance (and through newspaper publicity) others might overhear.

=== WBBM Lincoln ===
A few months later, Atlass procured a proper broadcasting station license with the call sign WBBM, which made its debut on the evening of February 6, 1924, transmitting on 1330 kHz. The station's call letters had been randomly assigned from an alphabetic list maintained by the Department of Commerce, and during the inaugural broadcast, Atlass adopted a representative slogan of "We Broadcast Better Music". Over the years, additional slogans would include "We Broadcast Broadmoor Music", "World's Best Broadcast Medium", and "Where Better Broadcasts Materialize".

WBBM's time in Lincoln was brief. In mid-February 1924, it was announced that the Frank Atlass Produce Company, the family business where Les Atlass was president, had been sold, and he was preparing to move to Chicago. The last reported broadcast in Lincoln occurred on April 14, after which the station was dismantled, and its equipment shipped to Les Atlass' newly purchased Chicago home. The station was officially deleted a few months later.

=== WBBM Chicago ===
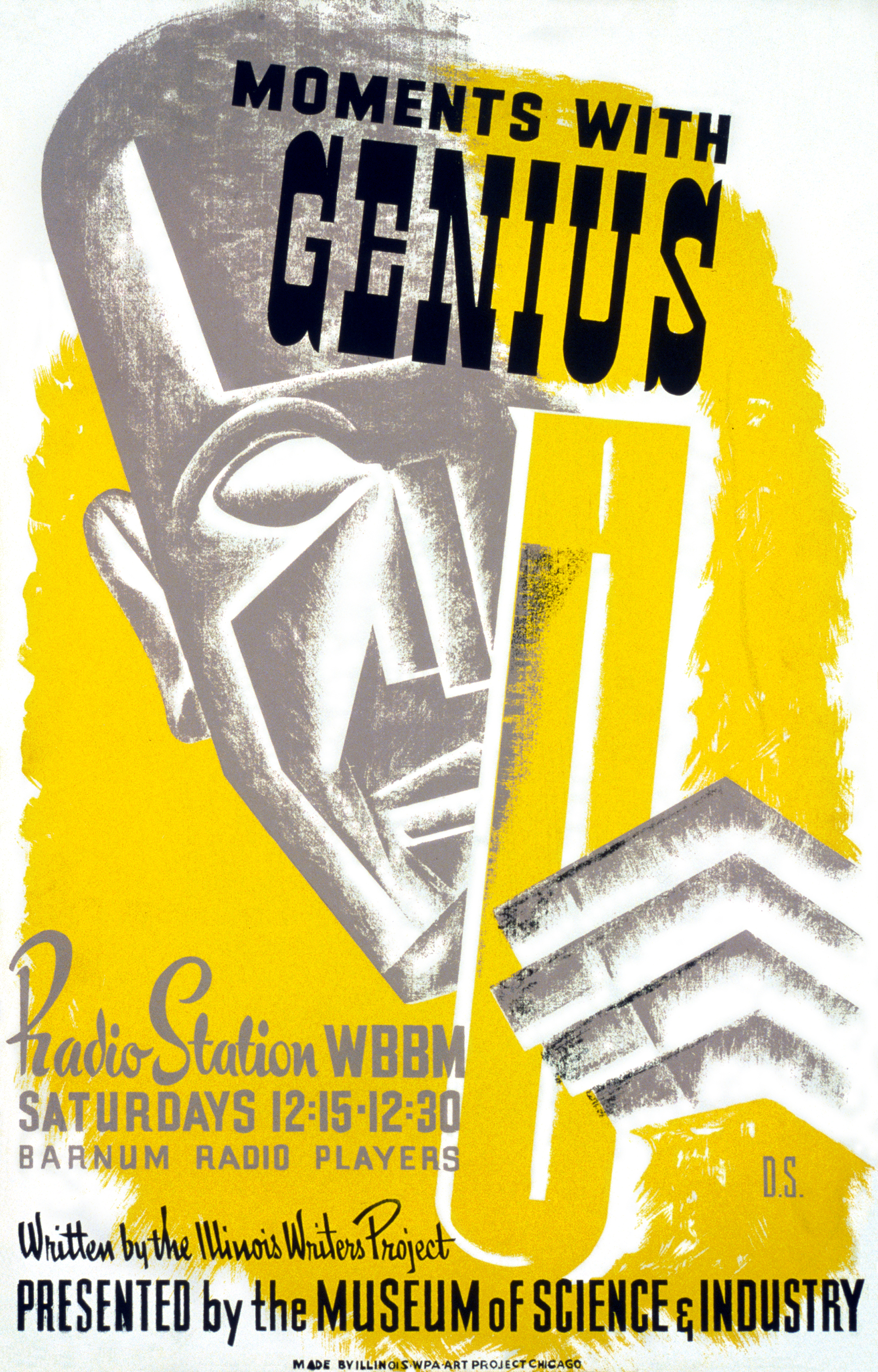
Poster for the WPA Illinois Writers Project radio series Moments with Genius, broadcast on WBBM c. 1939.

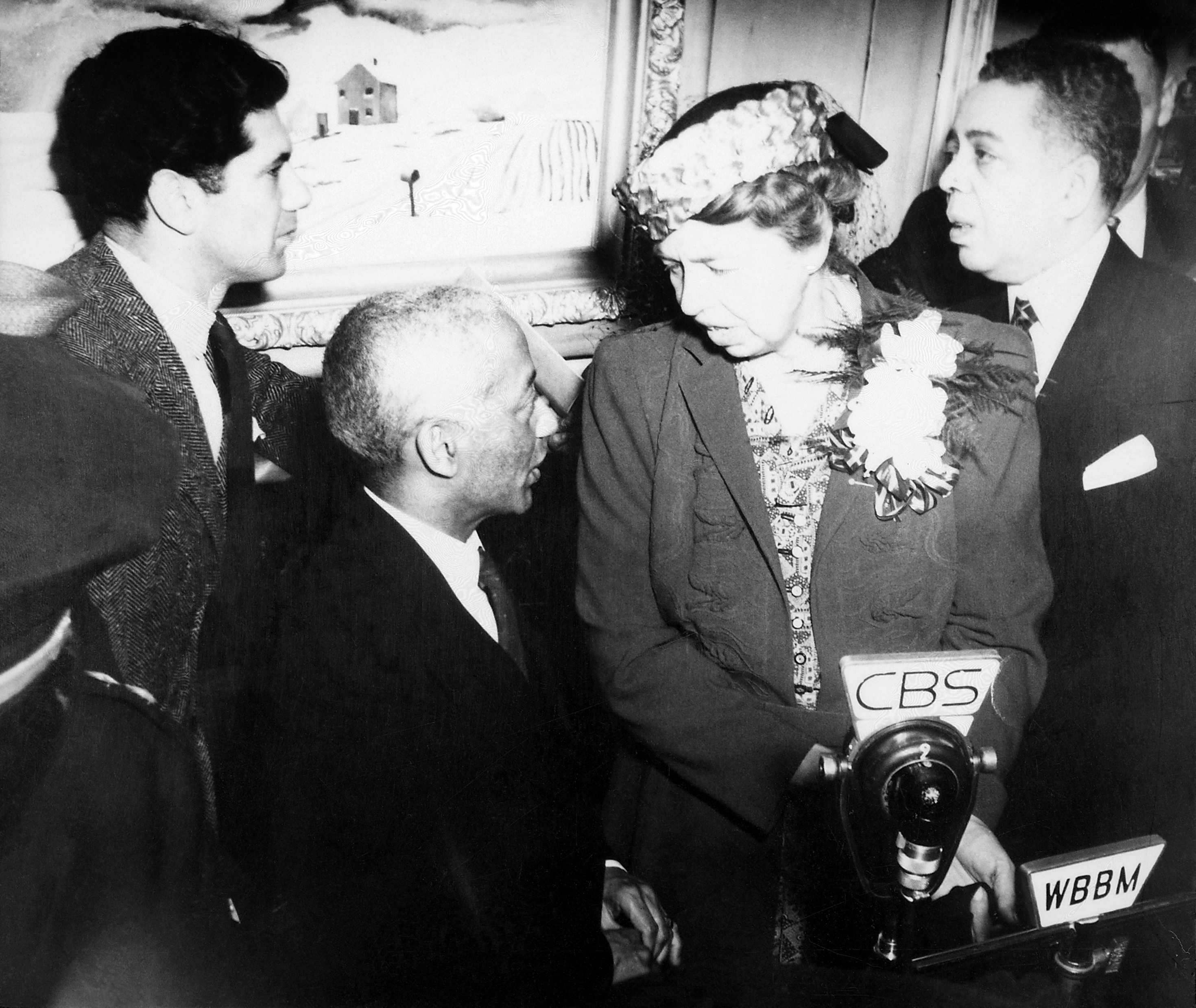
Eleanor Roosevelt dedicating the South Side Community Art Center, broadcast nationally on CBS Radio via WBBM (May 7, 1941)

Shortly after moving to Chicago, Les Atlass returned to the airwaves, and received a new license for a broadcasting station operated from his home at 7421 Sheridan Road, again with the call letters WBBM and transmitting on 1330 kHz, with himself as the licensee.

In 1925, station ownership was transferred to the Atlass Investment Company, with the station located at 1554 Howard Street, now transmitting with 1,500 watts. On June 4, 1925, studios and transmitter were moved to the Broadmoor Hotel in Chicago's Rogers Park neighborhood. "95.99%" of the station's programming was devoted to music, including live musical broadcasts aired from a small studio in the lobby of the hotel. In 1926, the Stewart-Warner corporation leased the station's full schedule, and began producing all of its programming.

On June 15, 1927, WBBM moved to 770 kHz with 1,000 watts, sharing time with Chicago stations WAAF and WJBT. Later in the year, power was increased to 5,000 watts. On November 11, 1928, under the provisions of General Order 40, the Federal Radio Commission reallocated frequencies on the AM broadcasting band. WAAF was reassigned to 920 kHz, while WBBM and WJBT remained at 770 kHz, with the frequency designated as a "clear channel" assignment. WJBT's license was acquired by the Atlass Investment Company, and the two stations were consolidated as WBBM-WJBT, although the latter call sign was rarely, if ever, used. Its transmitter was moved to Glenview, Illinois, and its studios were moved to the Wrigley Building. Power for clear channel stations could be up to 50,000 watts, and WBBM's was increased to 10,000 watts in 1928 and 25,000 watts the following year.

=== CBS Radio ===
The station began a long association with the Columbia Broadcasting System (CBS) on September 27, 1928, when it joined as Chicago's second network affiliate. WMAQ (later WSCR) had joined the network at its launch one year earlier. CBS bought a controlling interest in WBBM in 1929, and in 1931 it purchased the remaining station stock. Les Atlass remained at the station, while Ralph left and purchased station WLAP, then in Louisville.

On May 15, 1933, the station discontinued the WJBT dual call letter usage and reverted to just WBBM, after the Federal Radio Commission requested that stations using only one of their call signs drop those that were no longer in regular use.

As part of the November 11, 1928, AM band reorganization, KFAB in Lincoln, Nebraska, had also been assigned to transmit on 770 kHz. WBBM and KFAB were far enough apart to allow concurrent operation during the daytime, but their longer range nighttime signals required coordination to avoid mutual interference. Initially, the stations established a timesharing agreement for nighttime hours. However, in early 1932, KFAB switched network affiliation from the NBC Red Network to CBS. With much of their evening programming the same, the two stations establishing simultaneous synchronized broadcasting of their common network programming. The synchronized operation began on January 27, 1934.

In 1945, WBBM broadcast "Five after the Hour", written by Les Weinrott.

=== Move to AM 780 ===
WBBM's power was increased to 50,000 watts in 1935. In March 1941, as part of the implementation of the North American Regional Broadcasting Agreement (NARBA), both WBBM and KFAB shifted to 780 kHz. After the attack on Pearl Harbor and the resulting U.S. entry into World War II, there was an increase in air traffic at Naval Air Station Glenview. The Navy asked WBBM to move its towers to a new location. As a result, the station's towers and transmitter were moved to Itasca, Illinois, on May 1, 1942. During World War II, much of WBBM's programming was devoted to the war effort.

In 1948, KFAB was relocated to Omaha, and was reassigned to 1110 kHz, freeing up WBBM to operate full-time on 780 kHz, ending the nighttime synchronized broadcasts. In 1956, WBBM's studios were moved to North McClurg Court, with the rest of CBS's Chicago operations, where it remained until moving to Two Prudential Plaza in 2006. Les Atlass held senior level management positions with WBBM and CBS until his retirement November 29, 1959, on his 65th birthday. He died the next year.

=== All news programming ===
Beginning in the 1950s, as network programming moved from radio to television, WBBM maintained a personality-based middle of the road (MOR) format until 1964. It then eliminated music and switched to a news/talk format. WBBM adopted an all-news format on May 5, 1968, (after co-owned WCBS in New York City switched to all news in 1967, and KNX in Los Angeles made the change in the spring of 1968). The station was the flagship station of the Chicago Bears from 2000 through 2022, and in its history has also aired Chicago White Sox baseball games and Chicago Blackhawks hockey games.

Over the years, WBBM fended off competition from other all-news stations that were attempted in the Chicago radio market: McLendon-owned WNUS-AM-FM (1390 AM, later WGRB and 107.5 FM, now WGCI-FM), NBC's WNIS-FM (later WKQX) and Group W's WMAQ (later WSCR), which came under the CBS umbrella when Westinghouse Electric Corporation purchased CBS in 1995.

From the 1950s through the 90s, WBBM had been in a spirited battle with rival news/talk/sports station WGN for the position of the No. 1 radio station in the Chicago market. In the June 2009 ratings period, as estimated by Arbitron, WGN held a slight edge over WBBM in PPM-metered listener ratings. However, since the fall of 2009, WBBM has maintained a lead while WGN's listenership began to decline.

=== FM simulcast ===
Another challenge to WBBM's news radio domination came from Merlin Media, operated by former Tribune Company executive Randy Michaels. Michaels purchased FM station WKQX (the successor to WNIS-FM) in June 2011 with plans to switch formats to all-news as FM News 101.1, but in a preemptive move, CBS Radio launched a simulcast of WBBM over WCFS-FM on August 1. Previously, WBBM had been simulcast over WCFS's HD2 subchannel.

The FM station's call letters were retained and should not be confused with WBBM-FM; WCFS-FM's former adult contemporary format moved to the HD2 channel (until 2020), effectively switching signals with WBBM's audio.

=== Chicago Cubs ===
On June 5, 2014, the Chicago Cubs announced that the flagship station for their radio broadcasts would be moved from WGN to WBBM for the 2015 season under a 7-year deal. Cubs games were only broadcast on WBBM's AM feed; while the games were being played, WCFS-FM continued to broadcast WBBM's regular all-news programming uninterrupted.

The arrangement lasted only one season; after co-owned sports radio station WSCR lost the White Sox to WLS for the 2016 season, an option was invoked which moved the Cubs to WSCR, giving the sports station another Chicago baseball team. WLS only aired White Sox games for two seasons, ending in 2017, the White Sox relocated to WGN.

=== Entercom/Audacy ownership ===
On February 2, 2017, CBS agreed to merge CBS Radio with Entercom, the fourth-largest radio broadcaster in the United States. The sale was conducted using a Reverse Morris Trust to avoid a tax liability. While CBS shareholders retained a 72% ownership stake in the combined company, Entercom was the surviving entity, separating the WBBM radio stations (both 780 and FM 96.3) plus WCFS-FM from WBBM-TV. The merger was approved on November 9, 2017, and was consummated on November 17.

Despite the ownership change, WBBM radio and WBBM-TV maintain a partnership, with WBBM radio making use of some WBBM-TV local news and weather reporting. On March 1, 2018, Entercom launched a new website for WBBM alone on the company's Radio.com portal, leaving the former CBS Chicago portal.

Shortly after the move of the transmitter to the WSCR site, WBBM adjusted its news cycle for some segments for the first time in decades, presumably due to lengthening traffic reports and the adjustment of some ad breaks. The sports news segment moved to :16/:46, with business news coverage moving to :23/:53 past the hour, and hourly feature segments moving to :21 past the hour.

The COVID-19 pandemic had a major effect on the station's daily operations, with only three people at a time in the newsroom and most of the station's anchors and news writers working remotely. Traffic reports were temporarily reduced, the station's sportscasts were reduced, and some airshifts, mainly overnights, dropped traffic reports, with some news hours pre-recorded with only reference to the minutes rather than anchors being live, though breaking news in overnight hours was still covered live. Entercom changed its name to Audacy on March 30, 2021.

=== Transmitter relocation ===
In 2018, WBBM was granted an FCC construction permit to move its transmitter to WSCR's tower site in Bloomingdale. That allowed Entercom to sell the Itasca transmitter site to commercial and residential land developers.

WBBM's power was reduced to 35,000 watts during the day and 42,000 watts at night, from the previous 50,000 watt signal it had maintained since 1935. Entercom engineers said the reduction in transmitting power would not be apparent to most listeners, except in some fringe areas. The move was completed on July 18, 2019, with the previous transmitter in Itasca coming down shortly thereafter. Despite the reduction in power, WBBM is still considered a Class A station broadcasting on a clear channel.

== Alumni ==
- Mal Bellairs – broadcaster (deceased)
- Chris Berry – director, news and programming
- Chris Boden – sportscaster
- John Callaway – news director (deceased)
- Harry Caray – White Sox play by play; (deceased)
- Brian Davis – sportscaster
- Pat Foley – Blackhawk hockey play by play (retired)
- Paul Gibson – broadcaster (deceased)
- Rich King – sports director (retired from WGN-TV)
- Felicia Middlebrooks - morning drive Anchor (retired)
- Suzanne Le Mignot – reporter
- Brent Musburger – sports director; (retired)
- Lee Phillip – broadcaster (deceased)
- Jimmy Piersall – White Sox color commentator (deceased)
- Chuck Schaden – broadcaster
- Carole Simpson – reporter
- Dale Tallon – Blackhawk hockey color commentator
