= Consulate General of Canada, Chicago =

Diplomatic mission of Canada in Illinois

Coordinates: 41°53′7.5″N 87°37′21.6″W

Consulate General of Canada in Chicago
- Location: Chicago, Illinois, United States
- Address: Suite 2400, Two Prudential Plaza, 180 North Stetson Avenue
- Jurisdiction: Illinois, Missouri and Wisconsin
- Consul General: Claire Kennedy
- Website: Canadian Consulate General in Chicago

The Consulate General of Canada in Chicago is a Government of Canada diplomatic mission responsible for Canadian interests in the states of Illinois, Missouri, Wisconsin, northwestern Indiana and the Kansas City metro area. The Consulate General is part of a worldwide network of Canadian diplomatic and trade offices, including more than 15 across the United States. In the Midwest, Canada accounts for more than 35% of the region's international trade. Canada is the largest export market for Illinois, Missouri and Wisconsin, larger than Mexico, China, Brazil, Australia, and Japan combined. The Midwest–Canada trade relationship is worth more than $60 billion annually and supports more than 650,000 Midwest jobs. Canada is also the largest foreign supplier of oil, natural gas, electricity, and uranium to the U.S. The trade partnership, along with an integral energy relationship, a shared responsibility for the Great Lakes and the environment, and the vast cultural, academic and tourism ties between the two countries, are just a few examples of why the Canada–U.S. relationship is so beneficial and meaningful to both nations. The mission's 27 staff members in Chicago work to further this relationship by promoting Canada's interests in this region through stronger trade and economic ties, as well as enhanced political, academic and cultural links between Canada and the Midwest. The Consulate General also provides consular assistance to Canadians who are visiting or living in the accredited territory.

== Current and former Canadian Consuls General in Chicago ==
- Edmond Turcotte (appointed October 24, 1947) – the first consul-general
- Douglas S. Cole (appointed August 1, 1950)
- Frederick H. Palmer (appointed February 1, 1955)
- Gerald A. Newman (1957-1960)
- Charles F. Wilson (1960-1964)
- Stanley V. Allen (1965-1969)
- Leland H. Ausman (1969–1970)
- Robert D. Sirrs (1970–1971)
- John Timmerman (1971–1974)
- Wilmer J. Collett (1974–1979)
- James H. Stone (1979–1980)
- Robert H. Gaynor (1980–1984)
- Anthony Halliday (1984–1989)
- Douglas Valentine (1989 –1993)
- Allan Lever (1993–1997)
- J. Christopher Poole (1997–2002)
- Anne Charles (2002-2006)
- Georges Rioux (2006 – 2011)
- Gitane De Silva (2011–2014)
- Roy Norton (2014-2016)
- John Cruickshank (2017–2020)
- Madeleine Féquière (2022- August 2026)
- Claire Kennedy (September 2026 to present)
