= WCFS-FM =

All-news radio station in Elmwood Park–Chicago, Illinois

Simulcast with WBBM, Chicago
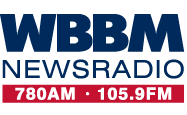
- Elmwood Park, Illinois; United States
- Broadcast area: Chicago metropolitan area
- Frequency: 105.9 MHz (HD Radio)
- Branding: Newsradio 105.9 WBBM

Programming
- Language: English
- Format: All-news radio
- Subchannels: HD2: Urban contemporary "Streetz 95.1"
- Affiliations: ABC News Radio; Bloomberg Radio; WBBM-TV

Ownership
- Owner: Audacy, Inc.; (Audacy License, LLC)
- Sister stations: WBBM; WBBM-FM; WSCR; WSCR-FM; WUSN; WXRT

History
- First air date: February 1948
- Former call signs: WLEY (1948–1957); WXFM (1957–1984); WAGO (1984–1985); WCKG (1985–2007)
- Call sign meaning: "Chicago's Fresh" (former branding)

Technical information
- Licensing authority: FCC
- Facility ID: 71283
- Class: B
- ERP: 4,100 watts (analog); 163 watts (digital)
- HAAT: 482 meters (1,581 ft)
- Transmitter coordinates: 41.879°N 87.636°W
- Translator: HD2: 95.1 W236CF (Chicago)

Links
- Public license information: Public file; LMS
- Webcast: Listen live (via Audacy); Listen live (HD2)
- Website: www.audacy.com/wbbm780; www.streetz95.com (HD2)

WCFS-FM (105.9 MHz) – branded Newsradio 105.9 WBBM – is a commercial all-news radio station licensed to the Chicago suburb of Elmwood Park, Illinois. Owned by Audacy, Inc., the station services the Chicago metropolitan area, operating as a full-time simulcast of WBBM (780 AM).

WCFS-FM has an effective radiated power (ERP) of 4,100 watts. The transmitter is atop the Willis Tower (formerly the Sears Tower). The studios and newsroom are located at Two Prudential Plaza in the Loop. In addition to a standard analog transmission, WCFS-FM broadcasts over two HD Radio subchannels, and is available online via Audacy.

== History ==
=== WLEY ===
The station originally held the call sign WLEY and broadcast at 107.1 MHz. WLEY was founded in February 1948, with commercial broadcasts beginning in April. The "LEY" in its call letters stood for Leyden Township, which contains the city of license of Elmwood Park. WLEY was owned by Zeb Zarnecki. The station broadcast in English and Polish. WLEY broadcast the "Polish Barn Dance", hosted by Zeb Zarnecki, along with other programs for the local Polish community.

Internationally known Old Time Radio Historian Chuck Schaden had his first radio broadcasts on Elmwood Park's WLEY. In the early 1950's Mr. Schaden brokered airtime from Mr. Zeb Zarnecki.

The station's studios and transmitter were located on Harlem Ave, in Elmwood Park. It had an ERP of 320 watts at a height above average terrain (HAAT) of 240 feet. In 1949, its ERP was increased to 1,000 watts and its HAAT was increased to 250 feet. In 1955, the station's ERP was increased to 32,000 watts and its frequency was changed to 105.9 MHz, after the previous occupant of that frequency, WFMT, moved to 98.7 MHz. WLEY was taken silent in 1956.

=== WXFM ===
In 1957, the station was sold to Evelyn Chauvin Schoonfield, a school teacher from Detroit, for $22,500, and its call sign was changed to WXFM. In the early 1960s, the FCC investigated several unauthorized transfers of control, which placed renewal of the station's license in jeopardy. However, the FCC allowed Schoonfield to keep the license, and authorized the sale of the station to WXFM Inc., with controlling interest owned by Robert Victor.

In the 1960s and 1970s, WXFM featured a variety of musical programming, including classical, jazz, show tunes, folk music, light classical, and MOR programs. On October 3, 1962, it became an affiliate of the QXR Network.

In 1966, the station's transmitter was moved to 333 North Michigan Ave. in Downtown Chicago, and in 1974 its transmitter was moved to the Sears Tower.

In 1970, Triad Radio, a freeform program, began airing on the station. Triad Radio began on March 31, 1969, as a three hour weekly program on 105.1 WEAW-FM. The program eventually aired for five hours nightly on WXFM, and continued to air on the station through 1977. In June 1977, a major change of format was announced, from progressive, including jazz and classical music, to "good hard rock and only good hard rock". Triad Radio published a free monthly magazine that was distributed through retail outlets.

Dick Lawrence, historian and radio personality, hosted "Sound of the 1920s" an original hour-long feature program of vintage music 'old scratchies' woven together by offbeat historical themes.

Count Bee-Jay's "Journeys Into Music", broadcast from a truck stop at 39th and Morgan to the radio station was a daily feature on WXFM from the 70s into the early 80s.

In 1978, Herb Kent began hosting a show on WXFM.

In the early 1980s, jazz began to dominate WXFM's schedule. Personalities on the station at this time included Daddy-O Daylie and Dick Buckley. Pervis Spann hosted an overnight blues show.

=== WAGO ===
In 1984, the station was sold to Cox Communications for $9 million. On April 2, 1984, Cox launched a contemporary hits format on the station, and its call sign was changed to WAGO. The station was branded "G-106".

WAGO featured John Records Landecker in mornings, who had made a name for himself on 890 WLS.

=== Rock era ===
On March 4, 1985, the station's format was changed to album oriented rock (AOR) and its call letters were changed to WCKG. John Records Landecker continued hosting the morning show on WCKG until 1986, when he returned to 890 WLS.

By 1987, WCKG had transitioned into a classic rock format. On-air personalities included Stephanie Miller, John Howell, Mitch Michaels, Allan Stagg, Joe Thomas, Debbie Alexander, and Rich Koz.

WCKG picked up the syndicated Howard Stern Show for mornings in March 1995. After Stern tried to foment a local rivalry with the locally-based Mancow Muller on WRCX by attacking the personality, his boss, and their families, Cox dropped the show in October 1995. The station blamed issues with "some of Howard's on-air content", and one day later, it was picked up by WJJD, then owned by Infinity Broadcasting, who distributed the show.

In an ironic twist, WCKG would sold to Infinity Broadcasting and become WJJD's sister station in 1996, with Cox acquiring Infinity stations in Orlando in exchange. At the end of the year, Infinity Broadcasting was purchased by the parent company of CBS. This would then clear the way for Stern to return to 105.9 after one year on the AM band.

=== Hot talk era ===
Logo as "The Package"

The station began evolving to a hot talk format in July 1996 with the addition of Steve Dahl in the afternoons and Stern returning to mornings, while classic rock continued to air in the remainder of the schedule. In 1998, Jonathon Brandmeier began hosting middays on WCKG, and the station further moved into a hot talk format. During this time, the station was branded "105.9 The PaCKaGe".

In 2002, rock music was re-added to the station's schedule in certain hours, and its slogan became "Talk That Rocks". On April 1, 2002, Kevin Matthews joined WCKG as midday host. Other personalities and programs during this era include, Patti Haze & Mary Pat LaRue, Pete McMurray, Opie and Anthony, Karen Hand and Dr. Kelly Johnson, Bill O'Reilly, Jim Cramer, Buzz Kilman, Wendy Snyder, Frankie "Hollywood" Rodriguez, Bob Sirott, Marianne Murciano, Little Steven's Underground Garage, and The House of Blues Radio Hour with Elwood Blues. The rock music was removed from the station's schedule by early 2005.

On October 25, 2005, the station was rebranded "Free FM". With Stern's departure from terrestrial radio on December 16, 2005, Infinity announced that effective January 3, 2006, WCKG would become the flagship station of Rover's Morning Glory, a show that originated from Cleveland and outside of moving to Chicago, held no previous connection to the Windy City and focused on a much younger audience than the rest of WCKG's staff, meaning the remaining audience which had not moved with Stern to satellite radio and other programs didn't stick around for the rest of the station's schedule. Following months of abysmal ratings, Rover's Morning Glory was dropped on August 1, 2006, and was replaced by the New York-based Opie and Anthony Show.

WCKG was also the flagship station of the NBA's Chicago Bulls from 2006 until 2007. With the demise of WCKG's talk format, the Bulls returned to all-sports 1000 WMVP.

Steve Dahl's son, Matt Dahl, joined WCKG on March 5, 2007, and Garry Meier joined the station on April 2, hosting late mornings. On May 2, 2007, the station's branding was changed from "Free FM" to "Chicago's FM Talk Station". It was later rebranded back to "The Package". By this time, the weekday lineup consisted of Opie and Anthony, Meier, Stan Lawrence and Terry Armour, Steve and Matt Dahl, Glenn Beck, Loveline, and Bill O'Reilly.

On October 29, 2007, was the last day of the talk format on WCKG, as hosts and station staff said their goodbyes on-air. Steve Dahl's show continued to air on WCKG, with best-of clips airing for the rest of the day. His show moved to sister station 104.3 WJMK on November 5.

On November 2, CBS Radio 'tipped' to the media writers at the Chicago Sun-Times and Chicago Tribune that the station would switch to an all-Christmas format that afternoon before the unveiling of its actual new format. However this was a ruse, designed to throw long-time ratings leader 93.9 WLIT-FM off from its plans to start playing all-Christmas music beginning November 8. The trick worked, as WLIT switched to all-Christmas music on November 2, while WCKG continued to play the "Best of Dahl" until November 5. That day, WCKG began stunting by simulcasting several of Chicago's other CBS Radio stations. From 5:30 to 10 a.m., it carried Dahl's first show on WJMK. From 10 a.m. until 2 p.m., it simulcast 670 WSCR; from 2 to 4 p.m., it simulcast 93.1 WXRT, and from 4 to 5 p.m., it simulcast 780 WBBM.

=== Fresh 105.9 ===
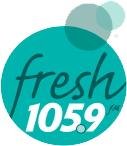
"Fresh 105.9" logo from 2007 to 2011. The logo remained in use when the format was moved to WCFS's HD2 subchannel from 2011 to 2019.

At 5 p.m., after the CBS News Radio bell for the top of the hour newscast, WCKG became "Fresh 105.9" with a modern-based adult contemporary format that originally focused on soft rock songs from the 1990s to current product (with some select 80s songs). The first song played was "Beautiful Day" by U2. The station shared its branding with co-owned WWFS in New York City. The station's call sign was changed to WCFS-FM, for "Chicago's Fresh", on November 26, 2007.

On February 25, 2008, morning personality Mike LeBaron and midday personality Lisa Greene signed on as the first DJ's on Chicago's "Fresh 105.9". In April 2008, Program Director Mike Peterson named Rick Hall as afternoon host. On October 6, 2009, Roxanne Steele began hosting afternoons on WCFS. Rick Hall moved to mornings on a temporary basis after Mike LeBaron left the station.

In November 2009, Steve Fisher debuted as the new morning host on WCFS. Upon Fisher's arrival, Rick Hall was moved to middays. However, in June 2010, new program director Jim Ryan told reporters that Hall had been released. Evening host Brooke Hunter was moved to middays.

On March 30, 2010, it was announced that Bill Gamble left CBS Radio Chicago, where he was Program Director of WCFS-FM and WUSN.

=== WBBM simulcast ===
On the morning of August 1, 2011, WCFS began redirecting listeners to sister stations 96.3 WBBM-FM and 99.5 WUSN. It played an hour and a half of "end"-themed songs, concluding with "End of the Road" by Boyz II Men and the first six seconds of "Don't You (Forget About Me)" by Simple Minds. Then at 8:10 a.m., WCFS replaced the "Fresh" AC format with an FM simulcast of co-owned all-news station 780 WBBM. Until that date, WBBM had been carried on WCFS-HD2, effectively (besides the loss of WCFS's physical staff) making the move merely a swap of the formats for the HD1 and HD2 subchannels.

The format change was seen as a counter to WBBM's new competitor, 101.1 WWWN, which switched to an all-news format on July 31, 2011, one day before WCFS's switch. The "Fresh" AC format was moved to WCFS-HD2 on August 1, rebranding as "The New Sound of Fresh 105.9 HD2".

The move left 93.9 WLIT-FM as the only adult contemporary radio station at the time in Chicago. The switch also gave the NFL's Chicago Bears an FM outlet. The "FM News" format on WWWN, which later became WIQI, failed in the market and was replaced by a 90's-centric adult hits format on July 17, 2012.

Though WCFS uses WBBM's on-air branding ("NewsRadio 780 and 105.9 FM, WBBM"), its official call sign remains WCFS, call letters only mentioned once per hour. Arbitron's use of the Portable People Meter for Chicago radio ratings does not need call letter verification to give credit for listening to 105.9 FM. WBBM thus identifies both signals in a rushed form of station identification at :56 past the hour as "WBBM Chicago, WCFS-FM-HD1 Elmwood Park-Chicago".

The two stations have simulcast continuously since August 1, 2011, with one exception. During the 2015 baseball season, WBBM carried Chicago Cubs baseball exclusively over the AM 780 frequency during the 2015 season, while WCFS-FM 105.9 continued to carry the all-news format on its own during Cubs broadcasts. Starting with the 2016 season, the Cubs moved to co-owned 670 WSCR. WBBM and WCFS returned to a full-time simulcast at the end of the 2015 season.

On February 2, 2017, CBS Radio announced it would merge with Entercom. The merger was approved on November 9, 2017, and was consummated on November 17.

== HD Radio ==
WCFS-FM broadcasts in the HD Radio format. The HD2 subchannel carries a sports gambling format, branded as "The Bet".

The station's HD2 subchannel debuted in January 2006, and simulcast the all-news format of WBBM AM 780. After WBBM began simulcasting on the analog/HD1 in 2011, the HD2 subchannel continued to carry an automated version of WCFS's former AC format (which gradually shifted to Hot AC) as "Fresh 105.9", leading to one of the few situations where the station's callsign meaning referred instead to an HD Radio subchannel. In February 2019, the "Fresh" format was replaced with an electronic dance music format, branded as "Energy". This format had aired on co-owned 96.3 WBBM-FM-HD2 as "B96 Dance" from 2006 until February 2019, when it was replaced with "Channel Q".

On March 19, 2021, WCFS-HD2 switched to carrying a new national format covering legalized sports gaming, branded as "The Bet".
