= WBBM-FM =

Contemporary hit radio station in Chicago

- Chicago, Illinois; United States
- Broadcast area: Chicago metropolitan area
- Frequency: 96.3 MHz (HD Radio)
- Branding: B96

Programming
- Language: English
- Format: Rhythmic hot AC
- Subchannels: HD2: Channel Q

Ownership
- Owner: Audacy, Inc.; (Audacy License, LLC)
- Sister stations: WBBM; WCFS-FM; WSCR; WSCR-FM; WUSN; WXRT

History
- First air date: November 1941
- Former call signs: W67C (1941–1943)
- Former frequencies: 46.7 MHz (1941–1946); 99.3 MHz (1946–1947); 97.1 MHz (1947–1953)

Technical information
- Licensing authority: FCC
- Facility ID: 9613
- Class: B
- ERP: 3,300 watts
- HAAT: 474 meters (1,555 ft)
- Transmitter coordinates: 41.879°N 87.636°W

Links
- Public license information: Public file; LMS
- Webcast: Listen live (via Audacy)
- Website: www.audacy.com/b96

WBBM-FM (96.3 FM, "B96"), is a rhythmic hot AC radio station in Chicago, Illinois, owned by Audacy, Inc. The station has an effective radiated power (ERP) of 3,300 watts, transmitting from atop the Willis Tower. The station's studios and offices are located at Two Prudential Plaza in the Chicago Loop.

== History ==
=== Early years ===
The station began experimental broadcasts in November 1941, as W67C, broadcasting on 46.7 MHz. The station's transmitter was located at the American National Bank Building, at 33 N. LaSalle Street. It simulcast co-owned WBBM (780 AM), carrying its CBS Radio Network schedule of dramas, comedies, news, sports, game shows, soap operas and big band broadcasts during the "Golden Age of Radio".

In 1943, the station's call sign was changed to WBBM-FM. In 1946, the station began broadcasting on 99.3 MHz. In 1947, the station's frequency was changed to 97.1 MHz, and in 1953, WBBM-FM moved to its current frequency of 96.3 MHz. In the 1950s, as network programming moved from radio to television, WBBM-AM-FM carried a full service middle of the road format of popular music, news and talk. After 1964, most of the music was eliminated, in favor of talk and news.

=== The Young Sound ===
In 1966, WBBM-FM split from simulcasting the AM and flipped to "The Young Sound", a format pioneered by John DeWitt for co-owned WCBS-FM in New York City. Bud Kelly was the announcer for "The Young Sound" on WBBM-FM.

"The Young Sound" aired instrumental cover versions of recent hits, contemporary pop instrumentals from artists like Herb Alpert, and contemporary vocal hits from artists like Petula Clark. Every hour's playlist was designed so that each song would complement the titles that preceded and followed it. Initially, the station had a three to one instrumental to vocal ratio. However, its playlist was skewed towards a young audience, which distinguished it from most easy listening and beautiful music stations of the era.

=== Chicago's Favorite Rock ===
By the early 1970s, the station was airing a format consisting of top 40, album cuts, and past hits. The station was branded as "Stereo 96 WBBM-FM, Chicago's Favorite Rock!" Bob Johnston served as program director.

In 1971, the station's transmitter was moved to the John Hancock Center.

=== Mellow sound ===
By 1977, WBBM-FM and several other FM stations owned by CBS had adopted an adult contemporary format defined as the "mellow sound", playing contemporary music but without the harder-edged titles. During this era, the station was branded as "The Mellow Sound of Chicago" and "Soft Rock 96". Initially, all of CBS's "mellow sound" stations were automated.

Dick Bartley, who later became a popular syndicated radio personality, spent time at WBBM-FM as program director and morning disc jockey in the late 1970s. WBBM-FM briefly carried American Top 40 with Casey Kasem during the soft rock years.

=== B96 ===
In May 1982, WBBM-FM began airing a Top 40/CHR format known as "Hot Hits", which was created by consultant Mike Joseph. Concurrent with the format change was the phase-out of all automation. Hot Hits was a high-energy format, playing only current hits, and featured numerous jingles to reinforce the station's identity. The station was branded B96 the following year.

During the latter half of 1986, B96's format began to tweak slowly towards a rhythmic top 40 direction, and a couple of years later during the late 1980s, began to embrace dance product. Despite those moves at the time, the station retained a selection of mainstream titles. In May 1990, the station became known as "The Killer Bee: B96". In 1995, the station began to add more R&B and hip hop as the dance scene diminished.

In October 2008, the station's slogan was changed from "Chicago's Hits and Hip-Hop" to "Chicago's #1 Hit Music Station", as its format shifted back to mainstream Top 40.

On April 21, 2023, WBBM-FM shifted to a "gold"-based rhythmic top 40 format featuring some current top 40/CHR songs, along with a broader playlist of songs from the 1990s to the present day. This follows the trend of other struggling Top 40/CHRs flipping to the format, such as WFLC in Miami and KLIF-FM in Dallas-Fort Worth, to attract a wider listener base. The station also reverted to its heritage logo used throughout the 2000s and 2010s.

Since 1992, the station has presented the B96 SummerBash concert.

==== Morning shows ====
B96's longtime morning program was the "Eddie & JoBo" morning zoo show. Joe Colborn (air name "Bohannon") first signed on at B96 in 1984 hosting evenings as "JoBo In Chicago". Ed Volkman started at B96 in 1986 hosting morning drive along with Karen Hand and Mike Elston. When Elston left B96 in 1988, Bohannon was moved to mornings along with Volkman and Hand, launching the "Eddie & JoBo" show. Outside of a three-year period between 1994 and 1997, the morning show ran for two decades until it was canceled on November 21, 2008.

On January 5, 2009, Julian Nieh and Jamar "J. Niice" McNeil started a new morning show, "J. Niice & Julian on the Radio". The two were previously together at iHeartMedia's WIHT in Washington, D.C. Nieh stayed with the show until December 2012. The show continued as "The J Show", with J. Niice as the host alongside Showbiz Shelly and Gabe.

J. Niice left in March 2018 and in April, B96 debuted "DreX & Nina" with Gabe Ramirez still being kept on. DreX left B96 in February 2019 and the show became "Gabe and Nina in the Morning", hosted by Gabe Ramirez and Nina Hajian. In September 2021, Hajian left the station, with Ramirez continuing to host the show, which was renamed "B96 Mornings".

In April 2022, 'The Morning Mess', hosted by Joey 'Nachoo' Rodriguez, Aneesh, Jeana and Karla, moved from Phoenix sister station KALV-FM to host mornings on WBBM-FM. In February 2024, 'The Morning Mess' would come to an end, as Rodriguez would return to KALV-FM, Jeana moved to middays, and Aneesh left the station; Karla remained in mornings. Later that month, John Moug, formerly of KPLZ Seattle, would join the station for mornings.

=== Ownership changes ===
CBS had owned WBBM-FM since its beginnings. In 1995, CBS was acquired by Westinghouse. Infinity Broadcasting Corporation was acquired in December 1996, and shortly thereafter Westinghouse's name was changed to CBS Corp. Through its CBS Radio division, the CBS Corporation owned WBBM-FM for 76 years.

On February 2, 2017, CBS Radio announced it would merge with Entercom and would no longer be part of the CBS Corporation. The merger was approved on November 9, 2017, and was consummated on November 17.

== HD Radio ==
WBBM-FM broadcasts in the HD Radio format. The HD2 subchannel carries "Channel Q", Audacy's national LGBTQ-oriented talk and EDM network.

In January 2006, the station officially launched its HD2 FM subcarrier, airing a Dance Top 40 format as "B96 Dance". That format moved to a subchannel on co-owned 105.9 WCFS-FM in February 2019 and rebranded as "Energy". WBBM-FM's HD2 subchannel then switched to an Entercom format known as "Channel Q", a talk and EDM format, aimed at the LGBTQ community and heard in many radio markets served by Entercom FM stations.
