= Frederick Wehba =

- Born: February 23, 1947
- Died: July 21, 2021 (aged 74); Beverly Hills, California
- Education: University of North Texas
- Occupation: Real-estate investor
- Years active: 1981–2020
- Spouse: Susan (m. 1969)
- Children: 4

Frederick Wehba (1947 - 2021) was an American real-estate investor and founder of the investment firm BentleyForbes.

== Personal life ==
Wehba was born and raised in Texas. He described his childhood that he spent working in his father's grocery store. He received a bachelor's degree from University of North Texas. Wehba married his wife, Susan, in 1969. They had four children. At his death they resided in the Los Angeles area. Wehba identified as a Christian.

== Career ==
In 1969, Wehba began his real-estate career by purchasing a small grocery store. His early focus was primarily grocery and retail shopping centers throughout Oklahoma and Texas. Wehba expanded his business throughout the 70s and, by 1983 real estate dominated the majority of his time, leading to the formation of a national commercial real estate investment company. Wehba founded the Los Angeles-based Bentley Forbes firm in 1993.

== Philanthropy ==
During his life Wehba served his community through involvement with a variety of organizations including California Baptist University, The Dove Foundation, In Christ Church, The Alliance for College-Ready Public Schools, the Cedar-Sinai Medical Center, the Church at Beverly Hills, the Muscular Dystrophy Association and the Institute for Social and Economic Policy on the Middle East. He was a highly active member of the Jeffrey Foundation, which offers child care and counseling for families in southern California.
