= The Roe Conn Show =

American talk radio show

The Roe Conn Show, was a talk radio show hosted by Roe Conn and various co-hosts on WLS-AM between 1989-2014 and on WGN-AM between 2015-2020.

== History ==
In 1995, Garry Meier and Roe Conn began The Roe and Garry Show. During this show, Jim Johnson and Christina Filiaggi gave the news and traffic, respectively. Johnson and Filiaggi also offered their opinions on what the two hosts were discussing throughout the course of the show. This first show saw high ratings and was successful. After 9 years, Meier's contract expired and he left in 2004. The show was renamed The Roe Conn Show and it was restructured around Conn, with Johnson and Filiaggi as supporting cast.

In late 2005, Bill Leff was added. He proved to be funnier and quicker than Meier, but he often disappeared into the background when Conn began talking. In May 2009, Leff was removed from the show because of cost cutting at parent company Citadel Broadcasting.

Amy Jacobsen saw her start at WLS-AM in June 2008. In March 2009, she was added to The Roe Conn Show providing the traffic and was a side-kick to the show. With Jacobsen's full-time addition to the show in 2009, Filiaggi was laid off.

In December 2009 - March 2010, changes were made The Roe Conn Show due to low ratings and budget cutting at WLS and Citadel. One of these changes was that Jacobsen was removed and replaced by Jill Urchak who provided the traffic from outside the studio. This arrangement did not last long; in March, Christina Filiaggi was brought back on the show. Then, Cisco Cotto was added and the name of the show was changed to The Roe & Cotto Show. Ron Magers, one of the top Chicago news anchors, had been a daily commenter on the show during the 3:00 pm half-hour starting in 1997. However, in late 2009, Magers was removed from the show due to budget cutting at the station. Just 7 weeks later, Magers was reinstated on the show. The change was made not long after Michael Damsky became president of WLS-AM; this being one of his top priorities.

On April 12, 2010, Richard Roeper was added to the cast of The Roe Conn Show. With Roepers addition to the show, it was renamed Roe and Roeper.

Beginning January 28, 2013, the final hour (5-6 p.m.) of the show became a sports-themed show, with the title 89 WLS Sports Pregame Show. The Sports Pregame Show featured longtime Chicago sports media reporter and anchor Lou Canellis talking sports with Conn and Roeper for the final hour of the day. Due to lagging ratings and new management, the sports show was removed; its final broadcast on January 29, 2014. The 5:00 hour has since reverted to its original programming.

Longtime newsman Jim Johnson celebrated his last day on-air June 28, 2013. His career spanned over 45 years at WLS, including the last 18 years during the Roe Conn Show. His replacement was former WBBM-TV morning news anchor Susan Carlson. Less than a year later, in March 2014, Carlson transitioned into a larger position at WMAQ-TV, which would require her to leave the WLS chair. Her final appearance was April 25. News was then delivered by Ryan Burrow and traffic by Christina Filiaggi. Burrow's news included a four-minute summary at the top of the hour and a two-minute report at the bottom of the hour. Filiaggi's traffic reports were delivered on the "fives" (at the 5-, 15- and 25-minute mark of each hour). In addition, The Wall Street Journal Report was aired at 45 minutes past the hour.

On October 7, 2014, media blogger Robert Feder reported that veteran Chicago broadcaster Steve Dahl would being joining WLS-AM as the afternoon personality, thus replacing Roe & Roeper. On October 8, 2014, Roe Conn announced on the WLS-TV morning program "Windy City Live" that, indeed, he and Roper would not be returning to WLS and that Dahl would be taking over, most likely on November 3, 2014.

Starting January 26, 2015, The Roe Conn Show began airing on WGN-AM from 3 pm to 7pm CDT.

== Special segments ==
=== Top 5 at Five ===
The Top 5 at Five has been part of the Roe Conn Show since its establishment. Five stories are featured, all being summarized with audio clips and analysis. Many of these stories are political in nature, with some being weird news and some as the more popular stories of the day. In January 2013, the segment was transformed into a sports-themed segment airing at 5:30, as part of the revamping of the 5:00 hour into a sports show. After an outcry from listeners, it was moved to 4:00, airing as the Top 4 at Four, featuring four stories instead of five. After the ill-fated sports show was dropped in January 2014, the Top 5 at Five was reinstated at its usual time. Shortly after Nexstar Media Group acquired Tribune Media, the segment was renamed "The Top 5 Things You Need to Know Today" and the segment introduction music was cut.

=== Primetime Blago ===
During the corruption trial of former Illinois governor Rod Blagojevich, The Roe Conn Show aired a special segment titled Primetime Blago. This segment aired from 5:30 pm - 6 pm from Monday - Thursday. During this half hour, Andy Shaw, the former political reporter at WLS-TV joined Conn and Roeper for analysis of the days events concerning the Trial. Attorney Mike Monico also joined the show periodically. Roe & Roeper also aired a primetime special from 5:30-6 during the trial of suburban cop Drew Peterson in the summer of 2012.

=== The Canarble Wagon ===
The Canarble Wagon is a segment airing every Friday at 5:00 pm. It is a time when the cast of the show order alcoholic beverages from the Canarble Wagon. Contrary to many listeners belief that the Wagon is fake, just the cast members making it seem like they are drinking, the cast members are actually drinking the beverages.

The name of the Canarble Wagon comes from Jim Johnson's early days in journalism. When he was a reporter at the City Hall press room, veteran reporters told a story of a newspaper reporter who would come back from lunch drunk. This reporter could not pronounce the word cocktail; instead, the word canarble was heard. Johnson added the word wagon to canarble and the Canarble Wagon was made.

== On-air personalities ==
- Roe Conn - co-host, 1995–
- Garry Meier - co-host, 1995-2004
- Jim Johnson - news, 1995-2013
- Christina Filiaggi - traffic, 1995-2009, 2010-2014
- Ron Magers - commentator during the 3:00 hour, 1997-2009, 2010-2014
- Bill Leff - co-host, 2005-2009
- Cisco Cotto - co-host, 2009-2010
- Amy Jacobsen - traffic, 2009-2010
- Jill Urchak - traffic, 2010
- Richard Roeper - co-host, 2010–2014
- Lou Canellis - commentator during the 5:00 hour, 2013
- Susan Carlson - news, 2013-2014
- Jennifer Keiper - news, 2014
