= Bruce Wolf =

American lawyer (born 1953)

- Born: September 11, 1953 (age 73)
- Occupations: Broadcaster, sports anchor

Bruce Wolf (born September 11, 1953) is a veteran Chicago broadcaster and sports anchor who has been on both TV and radio for more than 20 years. He formerly hosted a politics-themed talk show weekday mornings on WLS (AM) radio in Chicago. He also fills in as a sportscaster on WMAQ-TV in Chicago and works part-time as a divorce attorney.

== Early life and education ==
The son of Ira Wolf, a hardware store owner in Chicago's Lincoln Park neighborhood, Wolf grew up in Skokie, Illinois. He attended Niles East High School.

Wolf, who also is an attorney, earned a degree in journalism at Northwestern University in 1975 and also earned a J.D. degree from Chicago-Kent College of Law. At age 24, he decided to attend law school while working full-time as a newspaper reporter and also was doing play-by-play broadcasts on two small radio stations.

== Early journalism career ==
Wolf first started working full-time for Lerner Newspapers from 1972 to 1981 and also was doing play-by-play broadcasts on two small radio stations. He caught a break when WXRT radio's owner Dan Lee walked into Wolf's father's hardware store and asked if Wolf would be interested in a vacant sportscasting position. Wolf began hosting Athletes' Feats on WXRT from 1976 until 1982 (the show then was hosted by Chicago Tribune columnist Bob Verdi from 1982 until the end of 2000). He also did morning sportscasts at WXRT. In 1982 he joined WLUP-FM Radio, also doing sportscasts.

While working for WLUP, Wolf created a character named "Chet Chitchat", a blended caricature of Chicago sportscasters Chet Coppock and Chuck Swirsky, his predecessor at WLUP, which became a weekly feature on the station's morning program.

== Work at WFLD-TV ==
In 1987, Wolf joined WFLD FOX News Chicago, where he became the morning sports anchor. While working for FOX he received three local Emmy awards. "I had never been on TV before, other than in a crowd shot during a Cubs game," Wolf told the Chicago Tribune in 1991. "But I'd been on radio and when I heard about Fox opening (August 1987), I sent the news director a tape I made. They were looking for a local guy, someone with a Chicago flavor, but with a different take on sports."

From around 1990 until around 1991, Wolf co-hosted 9:30, an informal talk show on WFLD-TV airing right after the station's 9 p.m. newscast. The program fizzled, however. While hosting the show, Wolf created controversy one night when he displayed a photograph of the Cuban revolutionary and leader Fidel Castro and joked, "They never did assassinate that guy, did they?" "I was just being a smart aleck, but I guess I triggered-maybe that's a bad choice of verb-some bad feelings," Wolf told the Chicago Tribune in September 1991.

While at WFLD, Wolf famously once decided not to bother with a traditional sports report in June 1993 during the station's 9 p.m. newscast, since few sports fans would be watching an evening newscast during a Chicago Bulls playoff game. As a result, Wolf delivered his June 2, 1993 sports report from the living room of his north suburban home, surrounded by his wife and five children, who chimed in on cue.

In September 1993, WFLD hired Chicago Bears defensive tackle Steve McMichael as a guest analysis on a new half-hour sports highlights show that Wolf was hosting. McMichael previously had worked as an analyst at WMAQ-TV in Chicago, where he once had brandished a knife on the set. "I'm scared witless," Wolf joked to the Chicago Sun-Times about his pairing with McMichael.

In September 1994, Wolf was demoted from being the 9 p.m. sports anchor at WFLD but remained at the station as a morning sports anchor, telling a local newspaper that he was "the highest-paid fourth-string sportscaster in UHF history." Also, referring to his own sarcastic bent and WFLD's parent network Fox Broadcasting Company's coup that year in picking up National Football League games, Wolf joked to the Sun-Times: "Well, maybe the NFL doesn't have room for a smirk." In that same interview, Wolf told the Sun-Times of his new predicament: "As (former Chicago Bears coach) Mike Ditka once said: "This too shall pass."

In 2003, Wolf publicly criticized a sportscasting rival at WMAQ-TV for wearing a Chicago Bears logo shirt while covering Bears' pre-season games, suggesting that the move undermined the rival's credibility. A year later, however, Wolf himself wore a Chicago Cubs hat and jacket, along with WFLD colleague Tamron Hall, while covering the Cubs' opening day festivities. In an interview with the Chicago Sun-Times, Wolf labeled his Cubs-related action as "hypocrisy," and combined a line from the movie Caddyshack with a quotation from the 17th-century French writer François de La Rochefoucauld in elaborating further: "But as La Rochefoucauld said: 'Hypocrisy is the homage that vice pays to virtue.' So I've got that going for me, which is nice."

After 18 years working for WFLD-TV, Wolf was terminated in February 2006. The reasons for his firing were never made entirely clear, but local media provided two explanations. One was that Wolf's contract was too rich for the station. The other reason involved a pair of incidents that had occurred over the previous six months. The first incident, in September 2005, involved WFLD suspending Wolf for three days after an awkward on-air appearance involving then-WGCI-FM radio personality "Crazy Howard" McGee, who apparently while appearing on WFLD had made a crude, below-the-waist gesture. Wolf turned around and denigrated the gesture during his sports segment, leading to an off-camera incident with a producer. The second incident, at the Chicago Auto Show in February 2006, involving a taped off-beat segment (which never aired) involving Wolf interviewing a man standing outside of the Auto Show in front of his own car. Wolf apparently asked if he could "key" the car, and the man dared him to do so. When Wolf did so, the man became enraged.

In December 2006, an independent arbitrator ruled that WFLD had no reason to terminate Wolf, and awarded him full back pay and severance. "Vindication is a relief," Wolf told the Chicago Sun-Times at the time.

== Work at WMAQ-TV ==
In September 2006, Wolf joined WMAQ-TV (NBC 5) as a traffic and sports reporter. "Traffic and sports? I'm not the first Channel 5 multitasker," Wolf joked to the Chicago Sun-Times in August 2006. "(Legendary Chicago TV anchor) Floyd Kalber once took it upon himself to do the news and weather. He was (nicknamed) 'The Big Tuna.' I'm just a little sardine." In January 2007, Wolf became the host of WMAQ-TV's Barely Today, a freewheeling news and talk show that aired at 4:30 a.m. and that involved him engaging in banter with news anchor Ellee Pai Hong and weatherman Andy Avalos. "I think 4:30 in the morning is a little too prime time-ish for me," Wolf joked to the Chicago Sun-Times upon being named the host of Barely Today. "What I was really looking for was a once-a-year show to be aired on the night that Daylight saving time ends in that one extra hour that you get at 2 in the morning."

Barely Today wound up lasting just five months due to poor ratings, however, and was canceled in June 2007. "Not too many years from now, when I'm an old insomniac watching TV in the wee hours, I'll look at the screen and say, 'Did I actually do a TV show at 4:30 in the morning? No. It must have been a dream.' And I will wish that I could go back to sleep and start dreaming again," Wolf told the Chicago Tribune's Phil Rosenthal at the time the show was canceled. Speaking seriously, Wolf had nothing but positive things to say about the show and his colleagues upon its cancellation, telling the Chicago Sun-Times in June 2007: "It was a very sweet show, especially so because Ellee Pai Hong is a wonderful partner."

After Barely Today was canceled, Wolf returned to sports anchoring and reporting duties at WMAQ-TV. He was let go from WMAQ-TV on a permanent basis when his contract expired in February 2008. "It was heartbreaking at times, but very rewarding too," Wolf told the Chicago Sun-Times in January 2008 about his full-time stint at WMAQ.

Since leaving WMAQ-TV on a full-time basis in February 2008, Wolf has continued to occasionally fill in at WMAQ-TV as a sports anchor.

== Career at major radio stations, including current work ==
As noted above, Wolf joined WLUP in 1982. In September 1991, the Chicago Sun-Times reported that Wolf was set to join a new all-sports talk radio station (which would eventually become WSCR) as an afternoon sports talk host. "From time to time, I get offers from stations. But I'm not going to say hello or goodbye to anybody in your (expletive) column," Wolf told the Sun-Times' Robert Feder. Ultimately, Wolf stayed at WLUP.

In February 1994, Wolf ceased working as a morning sports anchor for WLUP's Kevin Matthews to join WLUP's sister station, WMVP, as the morning sports anchor for Steve Dahl. "I'm not the new Garry (referring to Dahl's longtime former radio partner Garry Meier)," Wolf joked to the Chicago Sun-Times in February 1994. "There never will be another Garry. Garry couldn't be Garry again. I'm not Steve's partner. I'm not even his senior associate. I'm merely keeping a seat warm for Tom Thayer until he retires from the NFL."

In 1996, Dahl left WMVP. Nine weeks later, on May 8, 1996, Wolf's gig as fill-in morning host at WMVP ended as well, as the station decided to go with a variety of guest hosts.

Between May 1996 and 1998, Wolf largely was off Chicago's radio airwaves, although he performed occasional vacation fill-in work, most notably at WCKG-FM.

In January 1998, Wolf returned to Chicago's radio airwaves as the morning news and sports anchor for host Jonathon Brandmeier on WCKG-FM. "I stand on the shoulders of the giants of news broadcasting-Edward R. Murrow, Walter Cronkite and (Chicago newsman and past Brandmeier sidekick) Buzz Kilman," Wolf joked to the Chicago Sun-Times in January 1998. By December 1998, Wolf's contract was not renewed at WCKG after Brandmeier brought back his old colleague, Buzz Kilman. "Radio is a game of musical chairs. I almost worked with Buzz at the Loop last year. And I've known Buzz since he was middle-aged," Wolf joked to the Chicago Sun-Times in December 1998.

Between 1998 and 2003, Wolf largely was off Chicago's radio airwaves, although he performed occasional vacation fill-in work and had his Chet Chitchat character contribute weekly segments on Friday mornings on Kevin Matthews' show on then-ABC Radio-owned WXCD-FM between 2000 and 2001. "I believe the (Monday Night Football) hiring of Dennis Miller was the cornerstone of an ABC plan to distinguish its sports presentation as the most pseudo-intellectual in broadcasting," Wolf joked to the Chicago Sun-Times at the time the Chet Chitchat deal was signed. "The hiring of Chet Chitchat is the masterstroke that completes that plan."

Wolf rejoined WLUP in November 2003. "It's good to be home again at the Loop," Wolf told the Chicago Sun-Times at the time. "Anybody who considers a radio station as his home is an idiot. I'm an idiot. As for doing the news, I stand on the shoulders of giants: Walter Cronkite, John Chancellor, (and the frequently mocked, short-lived Chicago news anchor) Ron Hunter. I do not take this responsibility lightly. In fact, I take no responsibility at all."

In December 2004—and while still on the air at WLUP—Wolf auditioned for a job working alongside Roe Conn at WLS (AM) radio. The pairing didn't work out, however.

On March 5, 2009, WLUP fired Wolf from his role as a morning radio sidekick, as part of a cost cutting.

In May 2010, WLS radio hired Wolf as a Saturday afternoon talk-show host, co-hosting a two-hour program with political commentator Dan Proft.

In July 2011, WLS-AM announced that starting July 18, 2011, Wolf and Proft would begin airing their show five mornings a week, replacing the weekday morning show of host Cisco Cotto, who was fired. Wolf was let go from WLS in early 2015.

== Blogging and social media ==
For many months, Wolf was blogging in a now-neglected blog at ChicagoNow.com. and also was a frequent commenter on the Chicago broadcasting-themed Vocalo.org blog written by former Sun-Times columnist Robert Feder.

In April 2016, Wolf was criticized for an insensitive comment he posted on Twitter about the death of a Baltimore man who died from injuries suffered while in police custody. On the one-year anniversary of the death of Freddie Gray—which due to safety concerns about riots prompted the Baltimore Orioles to play the Chicago White Sox in an empty stadium in Baltimore on April 29, 2015—Wolf in April 2016 tweeted: "Sox in their Freddie Gray uniforms in Baltimore tonight." After he was criticized on Twitter, Wolf apologized in the Chicago Tribune, saying that he "didn't want to hurt anyone, but I have. My comedy, if that's what you want to call it, is in the Jackie Mason and Don Rickles tradition, though I'm not as good as they are. I'm kind of an equal opportunity offender. I've been doing this for decades and didn't intend for this to be more than what I've always done. But I did hurt people, and so I'm sorry."

== Personal life ==
Wolf and his wife Caryn have been married since about 1975. They have five children.

During the 1990s, Wolf lived in several homes in Riverwoods, Illinois. Wolf moved to Deerfield, Illinois in 2007 and then to his current home on a farm in Old Mill Creek, Illinois in 2010. "I thought I married a North Shore princess, but what I really married was a farm girl," Wolf quipped to the Tribune in June 2010. "I mow the lawn practically every day of the week, because it's like 20 lawns' worth."

Wolf also worked full-time as a lawyer for the Chicago law firm Holstein, Mack and Klein from 1982 until 1987. He decided to leave the law in 1987 to focus full-time on broadcasting. "When I was an attorney on the radio, that was crazy," he told the Chicago Tribune in 1991. "Trying to explain to a judge that you need a recess to do a sportscast...the two jobs didn't dovetail at all. It was difficult to do both jobs well. So when the TV opportunity opened up, I just seized it."

Currently, in addition to his broadcasting work, Wolf works part-time as a divorce attorney in Lake County, Illinois.
