= Peter Paul (actor) =

American actor, producer, television personality and bodybuilder

- Born: March 8, 1957 (age 69); Hartford, Connecticut, U.S.
- Occupation: Actor

Peter Paul (born March 8, 1957) is a former American actor, producer, television personality and bodybuilder. He and his twin brother David Paul usually acted together in films and were together called "The Barbarian Brothers". They both appeared in supporting parts including the two-hour Season 3 premiere episode of Knight Rider, "Knight of the Drones" before starring in several films including 1987's The Barbarians.

== Career ==
Peter Paul and his fraternal twin, David Paul, were high school wrestlers and bodybuilders who opened a gym in Narragansett, Rhode Island in the 1970s. They were encouraged to move to California in 1979 to see if they could break into show business and have the success attained by bodybuilders-turned-actors including Arnold Schwarzenegger and Lou Ferrigno. The brothers were together known as "The Barbarian Brothers" and "The Barbarians" and were branded as "The World's Strongest Twins" in personal appearances. Their public strength feats included 500-pound reverse-grip bench presses (by David), 150-pound dumbbell cheat curls for reps (by Peter), and 315-pound presses behind the neck for reps.

In 1982, David and Peter Paul were featured in magazines including Powerlifting USA, Muscle & Fitness, and a high-profile, 8-page Sports Illustrated article along with a segment on Showtime's "What’s Up, America?" This led to David and Peter Paul's role in the film, D.C. Cab as muscular cab drivers appearing with Mr. T. They appeared in supporting cameo roles in films including The Flamingo Kid playing beefy lifeguards, and on television in an episode of Knight Rider entitled "Knight of the Drones" and a 1985 episode of Hollywood Beat alongside star John Matuszak.

The Pauls would continue to do live appearances, TV show interviews, and were featured in a July 1986 photo spread in Playgirl magazine. The pair wrote a comedic spec script about their lives called Better Than One and shopped it to Cannon Films' Menahem Golan in 1986. Golan signed the pair to a two-picture deal but decided to place the pair in a film called The Barbarians, released in 1987 trying to cash in on the success of Schwarzenegger's Conan the Barbarian franchise. Neither the sequel nor the spec script for Better Than One were ever produced and the pair's contract with Cannon was considered completed. The pair made news by being the first nominees to attend the Golden Raspberry Awards in which they were nominated for a Razzie in the category of "Worst New Star" though losing to David Mendenhall for his work in Over the Top.

Motion Picture Corporation of America signed the brothers to a two-picture deal which they completed with 1990's Think Big and 1992's Double Trouble. David and Peter were filmed for a small part in Oliver Stone's Natural Born Killers in which they are in a bodybuilding public gym milieu being interviewed by Robert Downey Jr.'s character; but the scene ended up on the cutting room floor. Their part can be found on the director's cut of the film, in which director Stone says of the excised Barbarian Brothers scene "they're overacting, and it's my fault."

The brothers' father, Leonard Paul, proposed a Barbarians theme park in 1993 that was never built. The last feature film featuring the Barbarians characters was the 1994 comedy, Twin Sitters. The soundtrack featured three songs by the brothers and was later released as a CD soundtrack in 2006 by Worldblend Music. The Pauls would spend the next part of their careers doing personal appearances and trying to make it in the music industry. They rapped at clubs and were featured on The Midnight Hour, a music-centric talk show with Steve Dahl and Gary Meier. They found their biggest success on live stages in Hawaii.

The pair continued to make personal appearances, including a 2006 appearance at the Alamo Drafthouse in support of repertory screenings of The Barbarians and Double Trouble in Austin. The pair signed on to make a film called, Souled Out, with Gary Busey in 2004 and was pre-sold in the international film marketplace though never completed. The brothers' final film together would be in the 2013 video, Faith Street Corner Tavern, which featured David and Peter as themselves.

=== Bodybuilding ===
David and Peter Paul were high profile fitness celebrities despite never being part of the International Federation of BodyBuilding and Fitness (IFBB). They opened P (Paul) & D's (David's) House of Iron in 1977 in Rhode Island. They met fitness celebrities there including Pete Grymkowski and Joe Weider and received encouragement to move to California for better opportunities. Weider is sometimes given credit for nicknaming them "Barbarians" because of their wild fitness regime. They were often referred as "outlaws" and "bad boys" of bodybuilding promoting counter-conventional, freestyle weight training practices that some said were barbaric.

In California, they were regulars at Gold's Gym in Venice and demonstrated unusual techniques including placing smelly boots in each other's face to humorously kickstart their next feat of strength. Together they created a workout videotape, Barbarian Psyche Tape, that was sold in Muscle & Fitness magazine.

Their diet was said to be comprised on 36 eggs daily, dozens of amino acid capsules and chocolate milk. They made personal appearances at various gyms, bodybuilding competitions as celebrity judges or autograph sessions, and at high profile locations including Disneyland. Articles in the Los Angeles Times, Sports Illustrated and a wide array of bodybuilding magazine paved the way for their acting careers. Gold's Gym sent them around North America in select grand openings for new locations. In March 2020, Paul announced the death of his brother, David, just two days prior to the pair's 63rd birthday.

== Filmography ==
Year	Film	Role
1983	D.C. Cab	Buddy (as Peter Barbarian)
1984	The Flamingo Kid	Dirk (uncredited)
1987	The Barbarians	Kutchek
1989	Ghost Writer	Tony
1990	Think Big	Rafe
1992	Double Trouble	Peter Jade
1994	Natural Born Killers	Simon Hun (deleted scenes)
1994	Twin Sitters	Peter Falcone
2005	The White Horse Is Dead	Bookman
2013	Faith Street Corner Tavern	Peter Palpin
