= Kevin Matthews (radio personality) =

American radio personality

Kevin Menear (born March 12, 1956), known professionally as Kevin Matthews, is a Midwest United States radio personality, best known for his 12-year association with WLUP "The Loop" and its one-time sister-station, WMVP "AM 1000." Matthews became popular for his off-kilter take on various topics. He's known for doing voices, including that of his irascible sidekick, sportscaster Jim Shorts. One of his bits was encouraging his listeners to yell out "Free Bird!" at various concerts, whether it was the Chicago Symphony Orchestra, or Barry Manilow. One incidence of this was a heckler shouting "Free Bird!" as well as the names of Matthews and Shorts at a Bill Hicks show prompting an infamous rant by Hicks.

== Radio ==
During the summer of 1986, KWK-FM brought Matthews to St. Louis from WLAV in Grand Rapids, Michigan, but he was fired the next year. During his time in St. Louis he began calling into the Steve Dahl & Garry Meier show on The Loop in Chicago, often doing an impersonation of then-President Ronald Reagan in impromptu comedy bits with Dahl and Meier. He was hired by The Loop in March, 1987 as the weekday overnight and Sunday host. A month later, AM 1000 started simulcasting The Loop, including Matthews' show. Soon thereafter, Matthews' show began broadcasting exclusively from the AM dial between Jonathon Brandmeier in the morning and Steve & Garry in the afternoon. During this era, Matthews made occasional comedy-concert appearances in the Chicago area. He also promoted a line of clothing featuring himself and his characters. His fans were referred to as "Kev-Heads".

In September, 1993, just five months after renewing his contract to continue middays on AM 1000, Matthews moved back to The Loop as morning man when it switched from album rock to talk, and AM 1000 flipped to an all-sports format.

Early in 1995, Matthews was heard on WGRD-FM in Grand Rapids, Michigan; WYMG in Springfield, Illinois; and WQFM in Milwaukee.

In September 1996, he returned to AM 1000 as midday host after its failed first attempt at sports-talk. In October 1997, he shifted from middays to afternoons, going up against former colleague Steve Dahl at WCKG.

Eleven months later, Matthews ended his 11-year association with AM 1000 and its former sister-station, WLUP-FM, and almost immediately signed on to do mornings at WXCD (now WLS-FM). He lasted there until August 22, 2001, when he was let go when the station's format changed from alternative music to 80's music. After 7 months, Matthews joined WCKG in April 2002 as the midday host. Matthews remained at WCKG until March 2005 when talks regarding contract renewal broke down and his contract expired.

Matthews spent the summer of 2005 doing weekly thirty-minute internet broadcasts. On September 8, 2005, it was announced that he would be returning to Grand Rapids and WLAV as morning show host and would also be serving as Director of Program Development for Citadel Broadcasting. However, after 5 years, the stationed announced, on November 17, 2011, that Matthews was being let go as part of the shakeout resulting from Cumulus Media's takeover of Citadel Broadcasting. He was removed and replaced by veteran rock jocks Tony Gates and Michelle McKormick on Friday, November 18. Darrin Arriens, Director of Operations for Cumulus Media declined comment and Marcus Bradman, Director of Events and Promotions for Cumulus in Grand Rapids and Muskegon, directed comments to Cumulus' corporate headquarters in Atlanta. In a Facebook post, Matthews wrote, "I love you Kevheads so very much, thanks for the love back. What a wonderful group of human beings you are. We sure have had some laughs."

On December 2, 2011, Matthews joined The Steve Dahl Network, a subscription-based podcast network owned and operated by veteran radio and media personality Steve Dahl. He provides a one-hour-long podcast per week: The Kevin Matthews Show on Fridays. Each podcast features a sampling of his wide array of characters and often includes music from upcoming artists and bands, clips from his radio archives, movie and music reviews as well as phone interviews with famous entertainment or sports personalities and other people he has met during his 30+ years as a radio/entertainment personality.

In November 2013, Tom Manely, vice president of (creative) content at WGN Radio, announced that Tribune Broadcasting had formed a creative alliance with Matthews and have him serve as the imaging voice and overall spirit of WGN.FM, the online content portal associated with WGN (AM). According to Manely, "We really want to give Kevin a fun platform for all of his characters – hopefully to do things he’s never been able to do before, and he'd done some pretty cool, crazy stuff." On January 4, 2019, Matthews announced that he was discontinuing his podcast to embark on a tour to further promote his book, 'Broken Mary: A Journey of Hope', and share the story of his Broken Mary statue.

== Television and film ==
In the early 1990s, Matthews appeared as a contestant in a special edition of the television show Win, Lose or Draw in which all the contestants were Chicago radio and television personalities. In 1993, Matthews made a cameo appearance in the movie Blink during the scene on the train. In 1994, Matthews appeared as a surfer in an episode of Baywatch entitled "I Spike". Matthews as Jim Shorts hosted The Jim Shorts Cavalcade of Sports (For You), a send-up of sports clip shows, on Chicago's SportsChannel America affiliate. Matthews, as Shorts, together with Tim Kitzrow, was an announcer in the MLB Slugfest video game series. Matthews executive produced and starred in a documentary focusing on his faith journey, Broken Mary: The Kevin Matthews Story. The film was released in theaters across the US on October 7, 2025.

== Post-radio ==
Kevin Matthews travels the country now with Broken Mary, a statue that he found in 2010 discarded by a dumpster. This event sparked Matthews redemption and journey back to the Catholic Faith. On February 11, the Feast of Our Lady of Lourdes, the Holy Father, Pope Leo XIV, bestowed his blessing at the Vatican upon the statue found by Matthews. Recognizing the powerful message carried by the image, the Holy Father also approved the title “Our Lady of the Broken,” affirming it as a sign of hope for all who feel discarded, forgotten, or wounded.

The Broken Mary Project started by Matthews offers a free app, Pray the Rosary which features him praying and includes the story behind the Broken Mary Statue.

Kevin Matthews has written two books Broken Mary: A Journey of Hope published July 25, 2016, and Mary's Roadie: My Travels with Mary the Mother of Jesus published July 15, 2024.

Matthews executive produced and starred in a documentary focusing on his faith journey, Broken Mary: The Kevin Matthews Story. The film was released in theaters across the US on October 7, 2025.

== Personal life ==
Matthews and his wife, Debra Parker-Menear, live in Michigan. He has two children (son Trevor and daughter Teage) and three grandchildren (Trynn, Rhett, and Beau; children of Teage).

Matthews announced on December 8, 2008, that he had been diagnosed with multiple sclerosis.
