= Paul Brothers =

Paul Brothers may refer to:

- Paul Brothers (Canadian football) (born 1945), American quarterback for BC Lions and Ottawa Rough Riders
- Paul Brothers (sportscaster), Canadian television personality since 2006
- Paul Brothers, American twin actors and bodybuilders David Paul and Peter Paul (born 1957)
- Paul Brothers, American actors, boxers, and internet personalities Logan Paul (born 1995) and Jake Paul (born 1997)
