= Jim Johnson (radio presenter) =

American news anchor and reporter (1945–2025)

- Born: April 2, 1945; Chicago, Illinois, U.S.
- Died: March 28, 2025 (aged 79); Kansas City, Kansas, U.S.
- Education: University of Illinois
- Presenting career
- Station: WLS-AM 890, Chicago
- Station: WLS-TV
- Style: Talk Show
- Country: United States

Jim Johnson (April 2, 1945 – March 28, 2025) was an American news anchor and reporter on WLS (AM) 890 in Chicago for over 45 years, where he regularly participated in on-air discussions with the other on-air personalities ranging from Roe Conn and Steve Dahl to Richard Roper and Larry Lujack.

== Background ==
Johnson grew up in Chicago and the North Woods of Wisconsin. His father was also in the news business, working at the City News Bureau of Chicago, then with the Chicago Sun Times. When the family lived in the North Woods, they built and operated a hunting and fishing lodge. This lodge was a popular vacation spot for Chicago politicians, judges, policemen, and firefighters, including then Mayor of Chicago Richard J. Daley and his son and future Mayor, Richard M. Daley. Jim married his college sweetheart, Denise. Their daughter, Alexis Del Cid, following in her father and grandfather's footsteps, working as a long-time reporter and news anchor.

Johnson had a bachelor's and master's degree in communications from the University of Illinois.

In July 2021, Jim’s daughter, Alexis, announced that Jim was battling Alzheimer’s disease. She chronicled the family's journey on her Facebook page, which is open to the public. Johnson died of complications from the disease on March 28, 2025, at the age of 79.

== Career ==
Johnson began his broadcasting career as a television news anchor in Champaign, Illinois. He was known as a veteran of Chicago broadcasting, taking part in television and radio news for more than four decades. He entered the Chicago news business at the age of 23 in 1968, perhaps one of the most turbulent years in Chicago history with the Assassination of Martin Luther King, Jr. starting riots and anti-war protests. In the late 1970s, Johnson worked as a reporter at ABC 7 Chicago in addition to his work on the radio. The 1980s saw him working as a fill-in news anchor on the Steve and Garry Show with Steve Dahl and Garry Meier. Johnson then began to work for the Roe and Garry Show. He continued to work with Roe Conn as co-hosts changed throughout the years.

According to Johnson, some of his major achievements include creating the Canarble Wagon and the Jimism. The 'Canarble Wagon' was a segment airing on the Roe Conn Show every Friday on at 5:00 pm. It is a time when the cast of the show order alcoholic beverages from the Canarble Wagon. The name 'Canarble Wagon' comes from Johnson's early days in journalism. When he was a reporter at the City Hall press room, veteran reporters told a story of a newspaper reporter who would come back from lunch drunk. This reporter could not pronounce the word cocktail; instead, the word canarble was heard. Johnson added the word wagon to canarble and the Canarble Wagon was made. The Jimism was "the practice of botched news reporting". If a listener "catches" a Jimism, they called in to the station and report it. If Johnson did say a Jimism, the caller won a "I Caught a Jimism" T-shirt.

On April 30, 2013, Johnson announced on air during the Roe & Roeper show that he would retire when his current contract expired in June 2013. His final newscast was at 6:30 p.m. on June 28, 2013. He was replaced by news anchor Susan Carlson.
