= Twin Sitters =

American comedy film directed by John Paragon

- Promotional poster
- Directed by: John Paragon
- Written by: John Paragon
- Produced by: Christopher Pearce; John Thompson; Yoram Pelman; David Paul; Peter Paul
- Starring: Peter Paul; David Paul; Christian Cousins; Joseph Cousins; Rena Sofer; Jared Martin; Barry Dennen; Mother Love; George Lazenby
- Cinematography: John Hartigan
- Edited by: Sebastian Serrell; Watts Gerard Jakubowicz
- Music by: Paul Sabu
- Production companies: Global Pictures; Surge Productions Inc.
- Distributed by: Columbia-TriStar Home Entertainment
- Release dates: 10 October 1994 (Italy); 19 September 1995 (Germany); 12 December 1995 (U.S. video); 22 December 1996 (Spain, TV)
- Running time: 93 minutes
- Language: English
- Budget: $6,000,000

Twin Sitters (also called The Babysitters) is a 1995 American action comedy film directed and written by John Paragon and starring Peter Paul, David Paul and Christian and Joseph Cousins. The plot concerns identical twin brother bodybuilders who protect 10 year old identical twin brother pranksters left by a corrupt uncle in their care. The film has a cult status in Russia and other post-Soviet states.

== Plot ==
Peter and David Falcone are identical twin brother waiters who want nothing more than to open their own restaurant, but are unable to get a loan. Frank Hillhurst is a corrupt businessman who has decided to give state's evidence, but his former right-hand man has threatened to kill Hillhurst and his nephews if he testifies. After the Falcone twins save Hillhurst's life, he hires them to protect his young nephews, paying them more than they have ever made in their life. Hillhurst soon departs with Federal agents, leaving Peter and David with a pair of massively mischievous identical twin ten-year-old brothers with a double mean streak.

== Cast ==
- Peter Paul as Peter Falcone
- David Paul as David Falcone
- Christian Cousins as Bradley
- Joseph Cousins as Steven
- Rena Sofer as Judy Newman
- Jared Martin as Frank Hillhurst
- Barry Dennen as Thomas
- Mother Love as Penny
- George Lazenby as Leland Stromm
- Valentina Vargas as Lolita
- Vic Trevino as Ramon
- David Wells as Bennett
- Danny Lee Clark as Sniper / Cop (as Dan Clark)
- Paul Bartel as Linguini-covered man
- Suzanne Kent as Linguini-covered woman
- Jacque Lynn Colton as Ma Falcone
- Don Amendolia as Pa Falcone
- Rhonda Rydell as Reporter
- John Paragon as Loan Officer
- Lynne Marie Stewart as Homeless Woman
- Del Rubio Triplets as The Waitresses

== Soundtrack ==
1. "At War with the Weights" by Paul Sabu
2. "Shut Up" by Peter Paul & David Paul
3. "Watcha Lookin' At" by Peter Paul & David Paul
4. "The Babysitters" by Paul Sabu
5. "I Ride My Harley" by Peter Paul & David Paul
6. "Brothers Forever" by Paul Sabu
