= Double Trouble (1992 film) =

Barbarian Brothers action comedy by John Paragon

- Directed by: John Paragon
- Written by: Kurt Wimmer; Charles Osburn
- Screenplay by: Jeffrey Kerns
- Produced by: Brad Krevoy; Steven Stabler
- Starring: Peter; David Paul; Troy Donahue; James Doohan; Collin Bernsen; Bill Mumy; Roddy McDowall; David Carradine; Lewis Arquette
- Cinematography: Richard Michalak
- Edited by: Jonas Thaler
- Music by: Kevin Nadeau
- Distributed by: Motion Picture Corporation of America
- Release date: February 14, 1992
- Running time: 86 minutes
- Country: U.S.
- Language: English

Double Trouble is a 1992 action comedy film released theatrically in limited release on February 14, 1992 and on home video. It stars the "Barbarian Brothers"—Peter and David Paul—and is directed by John Paragon. Co-stars include Troy Donahue, James Doohan, Collin Bernsen, Bill Mumy, Roddy McDowall, David Carradine and Lewis Arquette. The Barbarian Brothers appeared in person at the Marina Twins Cinema, one of five Honolulu movie theaters playing the title. The film was released on home video on VHS and LaserDisc in 1992. The film was issued on DVD by Metro-Goldwyn-Mayer Home Video's Limited Edition Collection series in 2015. Kino Lorber released the film on Blu-ray in 2023.

== Plot ==
Peter Jade earns his living as a crook. During one of his thieving tours, a puzzling circuit board falls into his hands. He soon realizes that there is a counterpart to this plate; with both plates, you are able to open a safe on the international diamond exchange. The leader of a criminal organization, Philip Chamberlain, has taken possession of the other circuit board, also recognizes the connection, and goes in search of its counterpart.

This forces Peter to team up with his twin brother David, a police officer, to stop the criminal organization. Since the twin brothers can hardly be more unequal, there are always differences of opinion between the Jade brothers. They quickly become the target of Chamberlain's global syndicate. Since they are quick-witted, they manage one time at a time to get their pursuers out of the way.

== Cast ==
- Peter Paul as Peter Jade
- David Paul as David Jade
- Roddy McDowall as Philip Chamberlain
- David Carradine as Mr. C
- Steve Kanaly as Kent
- Troy Donahue as Leonard Stewart
- Bill Mumy as Bob
- Bobbie Brown as gorgeous model girlfriend
