= Roe Conn =

American former radio host (born 1964)

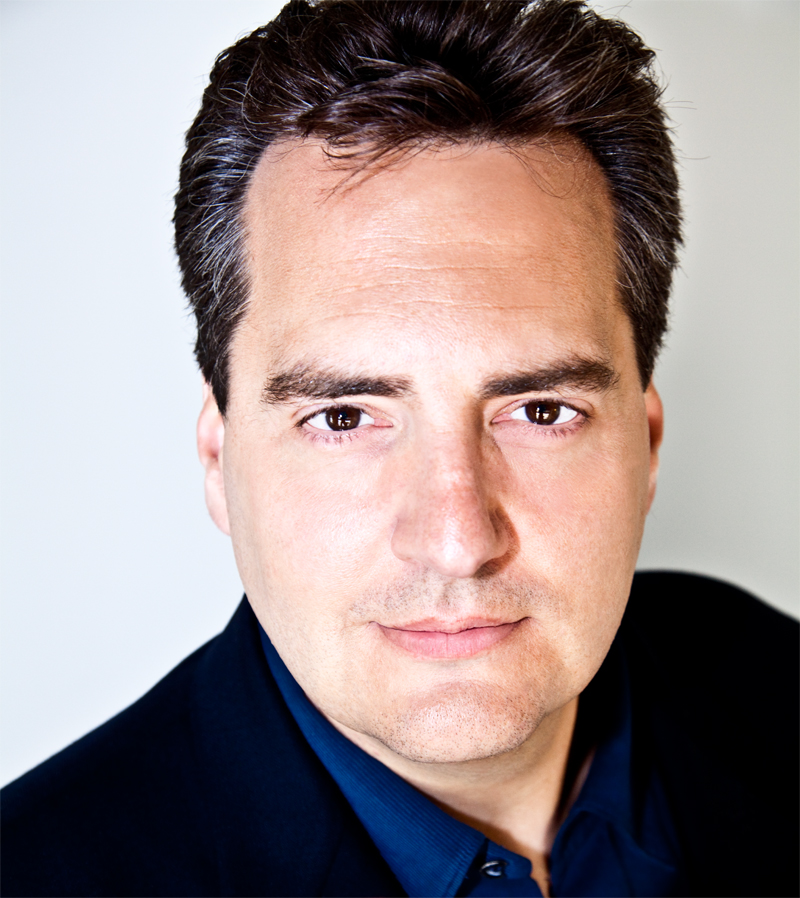
- Born: June 6, 1964 (age 62); Chicago, Illinois, U.S.
- Presenting career
- Country: United States
- Website: roeconn.com

Roe B. Conn (born June 6, 1964) is a former American talk radio host based in Chicago who is now a sworn deputy and Director of the Cook County sheriff's office.

== Career ==
Roe's first radio gig was Saturday overnights on WDUB in Granville, Ohio. Early in his career Conn chose to use the on air pseudonym Robert Thomas, believing that his real name was not suitable for the radio business. Returning to Chicago after graduating from college he worked fill-in duties at WLUW, starting in August 1986. He then was the producer for Don Vogel on WMAQ (AM) and Walter Jacobson at WBBM-TV. On August 27, 1989 Conn debuted a Sunday morning radio show at WLS (AM). Conn maintains that his performance went poorly, but that the program director ordered the show be continued after confusing Conn with another host.

He received his first national exposure for his daily roundup of the O.J. Simpson trial. After that, he continued to host his regular show on WLS (AM). Eventually he teamed up with Garry Meier to cohost the highly successful Roe & Garry Show. In 2004, amid an impasse in contract negotiations with the station, Meier did not renew his contract with WLS. Roe then became the sole host of the show, which also featured Jim Johnson and Christina Filiaggi. In the spring 2006 ratings period, The Roe Conn Show became Chicago's most listened-to radio talk show among adults.

On March 27, 2009, Conn announced on his WLS-AM radio show a new, parallel endeavor called "The Roe Report." The Roe Report was a nationally syndicated daily news/commentary segment initially airing in New York (WABC), Los Angeles (KABC) and Chicago (WLS-AM), filling the void left by the death of Paul Harvey. The final "Roe Report" aired October 29, 2010. A reason for ending the Report was not cited.

On May 8, 2009, it was announced on the show that longtime associate Christina Filiaggi had been once more laid off by station management, and would be replaced by Chicago area newscaster Amy Jacobson the following week; however, after a change in management, she returned for the third time on March 26, 2010.

On May 29, 2009, it was announced on the air that Bill Leff had been laid off by corporate management. Roe and Leff had often joked on the air about the similarity of their voices.

On January 11, 2010, The Roe Conn Show became Roe and Cisco, as Cisco Cotto was introduced as the new cohost of the WLS afternoon show with Roe Conn. Also, Amy Jacobson was removed from her position doing traffic and weather for the show and daily appearances by WLS-TV anchor Ron Magers ceased, although Magers returned to the 3 p.m. hour on February 9, 2010. The following day the show became The Roe Conn Show again with the announcement that Cisco Cotto was leaving to host his own show on WLS from 9 to 11 a.m.

On April 12, 2010, Richard Roeper became Roe's new on-air partner, and the show was rebranded The Roe Conn Show with Richard Roeper.

On October 8, 2014, Roe Conn announced that the Roe & Roeper, was cancelled and he'd be leaving WLS-AM 890 after 25 years.

On January 15, 2015, WGN Radio announced that Roe would be hosting afternoon drive from 3pm - 7pm, beginning on January 26. His last show on WGN was September 4, 2020 after management decided not to renew his contract than ran through the end of 2020.

He is also a frequent guest and co-host of the Chicago daytime talk-show Windy City Live as of 2017.

After leaving WGN, Conn began working for the Cook County Sheriff, specializing in carjackings.

== Education ==
Roe is a 1986 graduate of Denison University, where he studied anthropology.

== Jim Condit Jr. ads ==
On November 2, 2006, Roe said he was disgusted that WLS 890 had to air Jim Condit Jr.'s political advertisements, accusing Michael Chertoff and Zionist Jews of orchestrating the September 11, 2001, attacks and planning Phase 2 attacks. He pledged to contribute $6,500, the amount that Condit paid for his ads on Conn's show, to the Jewish United Fund and the World Trade Center Memorial Foundation. Condit's spots were pulled from WLS that afternoon. Chicago Sun-Times columnist Robert Feder lauded Roe's stance as one of the "genuine class acts" in radio that year.

== Involvement with litigation ==
The Roe Conn show took a call on March 28, 2006, from a small-business owner who claimed to have spoken with a juror about the trial of former governor George Ryan. This possible juror misconduct was one of the bases for appeal in Ryan's conviction on criminal charges of corruption.

Conn testified for the plaintiff at a civil proceeding involving his former on-air partner Garry Meier. In the suit, Meier's former manager Todd Musburger said he was owed money for work related to contract negotiations. Conn's testimony contradicted that of Meier, and the jury sided with Musburger.

== Other business interests ==
Conn, in a partnership called R Plus Partners, owns two race horses. Ron Magers is also a member of this entity. On June 9, 2007, Conn became a winning owner when his horse, Greeley's Angel, won for the first time in Race 5 at Arlington Park. R Plus partners had a second horse, Sted's Pirate, but lost ownership after a $30,000 claims race at Churchill Downs on July 7, 2007.

== Awards ==
Talkers Magazine recognized Conn as one of the "One hundred most influential radio hosts in America."
