= Think Big (film) =

1990 film by Jon Turteltaub

- VHS cover
- Directed by: Jon Turteltaub
- Screenplay by: Edward Kovach; David Tausik; Jon Turteltaub
- Story by: R. J. Robertson; Jim Wynorski
- Produced by: Brad Krevoy; Steven Stabler
- Starring: Peter Paul; David Paul; Martin Mull; Ari Meyers; Claudia Christian; Richard Kiel; Richard Moll; Michael Winslow; Peter Lupus; Thomas Gottschalk; David Carradine
- Cinematography: Mark Morris
- Edited by: Jeffrey Reiner
- Music by: Michael Sembello; Hilary Bercovici
- Distributed by: Motion Picture Corporation of America
- Release date: March 9, 1990
- Running time: 86 minutes
- Country: United States
- Language: English

Think Big is a 1990 American adventure comedy film directed by Jon Turteltaub (in his directorial debut) and starring the "Barbarian Brothers" Peter and David Paul.

== Plot ==
Twin brothers Rafe and Victor are two truckers who have had a bad run of luck: they have a history of missed deadlines and are tormented by a loan shark named Sweeney, who repeatedly tries to repossess their truck. After yet another late delivery due to rushing a pregnant hitchhiker to the hospital, the pair are given one final chance by their boss, who orders them to ship barrels of toxic waste from the company Tech Star to a ship docked in California. To remind the brothers of the deadline, their boss fits a digital countdown timer, which he dubs "foul-up clock", to the truck's dashboard.

Tech Star is a company that uses child geniuses as slave labor. One such slave, named Holly, has invented a device that resembles an ordinary remote control yet can activate and deactivate any electronics by code. The brothers arrive at Tech Star and, while they are loading their truck, Holly stows away in the cab, having learned the shipment is destined to the same place where her fiancé lives. She is soon discovered, and while Rafe and Victor agree to protect her, they fail to understand her invention. They spend the night in a Texas motel, nearly eluding Dr. Bruekner, the CEO of Tech Star, and his hired goons, who attempt to recapture Holly as her invention is Tech Star property. Later, the brothers' truck stalls on the railroad tracks as a train is approaching. Holly struggles to remember the right code to restart the truck's engine with her invention, doing so at the last minute, but the trio fails to realize that she inadvertently entered a code that reprogrammed the foul-up clock two hours back.

Arriving in California, Holly destroys her device right before the trio is captured, not realizing it was an ordinary remote from the motel, which the brothers had switched with her invention, anticipating such an event. After presenting Holly with her invention and leaving her at her boyfriend's house, the brothers realize the foul-up clock "fouled up". With too little time remaining, they rush to the dock, but miss the ship. To make matters worse with their evident termination, Sweeney successfully repossesses their truck. Unaware of the cargo contents, he drives so recklessly that the barrels rupture and release their chemicals, contaminating the truck and causing Sweeney's hair to fall off in tufts.

Holly manages to market her invention and makes considerable amounts of money. She then partners with Rafe and Victor into making their own transportation company. The film ends with the brothers getting a CB message from Holly about a client, and set off in a brand new tractor trailer to begin their shipment.

== Cast ==
- Peter Paul as Rafe
- David Paul as Victor
- Martin Mull as Dr. Hayden Bruekner
- Ari Meyers as Holly Sherwood
- Claudia Christian as Dr. Irene Marsh
- Richard Kiel as Irving
- Richard Moll as Thornton
- Michael Winslow as "Hap"
- Peter Lupus as Bad Guy #1
- Thomas Gottschalk as Mr. Roberts
- David Carradine as Sweeney
- Tony Longo as Supervisor
- Sal Landi as Bad Guy #2
- Tommy "Tiny" Lister as "Z"
- Rafer Johnson as Johnson
- Jimmy Briscoe as Jimmy
- Darcy LaPier as Donna

== See also ==
- List of American films of 1990
