= The Barbarians (1987 film) =

- Directed by: Ruggero Deodato
- Screenplay by: James R. Silke
- Produced by: Menahem Golan; Yoram Globus
- Starring: Peter Paul; David Paul; Richard Lynch; Eva La Rue
- Cinematography: Gianlorenzo Battaglia
- Edited by: Eugenio Alabiso
- Music by: Pino Donaggio
- Production companies: Cannon Films; Cannon Italia SrL
- Distributed by: Cannon Releasing Corporation
- Release dates: March 20, 1987 (United States); April 24, 1987 (Italy)
- Running time: 87 minutes
- Countries: Italy; United States
- Language: English
- Box office: $800,000

The Barbarians is a 1987 sword and sorcery film directed by Ruggero Deodato and starring the Barbarian Brothers (Peter and David Paul), Richard Lynch and Eva La Rue.

The film is an Italian and American co-production shot in Rome and the Abruzzo Mountains. Peter and David Paul were nominated for a Golden Raspberry Award for Worst New Star for this film at the 8th Golden Raspberry Awards.

== Plot ==
The film is set in a heroic fantasy world. The Ragnicks, a tribe of peaceful travelling entertainers, are attacked by the evil tyrant Kadar, who takes their queen Canary hostage. Canary, however, manages to hide her magic ruby, the lucky jewel of the Ragnicks which Kadar seeks to bolster his power. Two young twins from the tribe, Kutchek and Gore, bite off two of Kadar's fingers. In retaliation, Kadar has them taken prisoner as well, but agrees to spare their lives if Canary becomes his bride.

Kutchek and Gore are separated and work as slaves for several years, and grow up as amazingly strong adults. Once they have come of age, Kadar sets them up to fight each other to the death in the arena, their faces masked by metal helmets. But as they struggle, Gore knocks open Kutchek's helmet, revealing his face; after recognizing each other, and after seeing Canary as a prisoner by Kadar's side, the twins escape from Kadar's fortress. In the woods, they find their old tribemates, who have led a life of misery ever since Canary's kidnapping, and a girl named Ismene, a thief imprisoned by the Ragnicks. At first mistaken for enemies and nearly hanged, Kutchek and Gore manage to reveal their past association with the tribe.

Incensed by the cruelties Kadar has imposed upon their lives, the two brothers plan to go back and seek revenge on the tyrant. Ismene leads them to a local trading post to get them some weapons, but have to leave empty-handed when the weapons dealer Jacko challenges them to a bout of arm wrestling and proves to be a bad loser. The three of them thereupon sneak their way into the palace harem, where Kutchek and Gore find Canary imprisoned. Instead of being freed, however, Canary insists that the two brothers recover the ruby, which has been secreted in an area called the Forbidden Land, where the Ragnicks first received the ruby and which is guarded by a fearsome dragon. But their presence in the palace is eventually discovered by China, Kadar's court sorceress. Intent on seizing the ruby for herself, China tortures Canary for information and departs to the Forbidden Land, but just as she find the gem, China and her entourage are met by the dragon, who devours them.

Following Canary's advice, the twins and Ismene first travel to a secret tomb to recover several magical weapons to fight the dragon, and then proceed to the Forbidden Land. The dragon rises to kill them, but the brothers slay it and recover the ruby from its guts. They entrust the gem to Ismene to return it to the Ragnicks, while they prepare to carry the final fight to Kadar. But then Kadar, who has discovered China's treachery, arrives along with Canary, and knowing that her time is at an end, Canary calls upon the ruby's magic to make Kadar kill her and call Kutchek and Gore back to the Forbidden Land. The brothers encounter the tyrant and do battle, and after Kadar tries to shoot them with a crossbow, but attempting to pull the trigger with his missing fingers, he is killed when they both throw their swords through his chest.

With Canary dead, the ruby turns to stone, but Ismene refuses to give up. Suddenly, the ruby is restored, a sign for the Ragnicks to choose a new queen for their tribe by inserting the ruby into the candidates' belly button, where it shall stick to mark her as their new ruler. But none of the Ragnicks' maidens appears to be suitable, whereupon the tribe chooses Ismene to try. The ruby remains in place, and Ismene finally reveals herself as Kara, Kutchek and Gore's old tribemate who had since left the Ragnicks for a life of her own. With their spirit restored, and with the brothers' return, the Ragnicks are free to resume their life of travelling and entertainment.

== Cast ==
- Peter Paul as Kutchek
- David Paul as Gore
- Richard Lynch as Kadar
- Eva LaRue as Kara/Ismene
- Virginia Bryant as Canary
- Sheeba Alahani as China
- Raffaella Baracchi as Allura
- Franco Pistoni as Ibar
- Michael Berryman as Dirtmaster
- George Eastman as Jacko

== Production ==
The Barbarians is an Italian and American co-production between Cannon Films and Cannon Italia SrL. In November 1985, The Hollywood Reporter stated that screenwriter James R. Silke was finishing his script for The Barbarians and along with Serbian director Slobodan Šijan, he began scouting locations. Variety later reported in July 1986 that Šijan was replaced by director Ruggero Deodato. The film was budgeted at $2.5 million.

Principal photography on the film began August 4, 1986 in Rome. Filming later moved to the Abruzzo Mountains in August 1986. Production had ended by October 1986.

== Release ==
The Barbarians was first shown in the United States on March 20, 1987. It was released theatrically in Italy on April 24, 1987.

It opened on 89 screens on May 15, 1987, earning $238,842 during its opening weekend. It grossed a total of $800,000 in the United States.

=== Home media ===
The Barbarians was released on DVD by Shout! Factory in the United States on August 27, 2013 as a double feature with the film The Norseman (1978).

A remastered Blu-ray edition was published in December 2020. Bonus material included a commentary by the film historians Troy Howarth and Nathaniel Thompson.

== Reception ==
A contemporary review by Michael Wilmington, published in Los Angeles Times, opined that "[s]eldom has a movie looked so good and sounded so dumb", referring to "moronic" dialogue and the constant bellowing of Peter and David Paul. Wilmington predicted that these would eventually attain a cult status. He was not happy with the screenplay but noted that "director Ruggero Deodato and his crew have contrived to make what must have been an inexpensive production shine with an ersatz sumptuousness, a Road Warrior raffishness and gleam."

In his book Horror and Science Fiction Film IV, Donald C Willis described the film as a "routine sword-and-sorcery action" while noting that "there's some dumb fun to be had in the casualness of the production" and that "the film has the refreshingly unpretentious tone of a TV beer commercial." VideoHound's Golden Movie Retriever described the film as "dumbbutfun" and awarded it one star.

Matthew Hartman of High-Def Digest called The Barbarians "[o]ne of the biggest and arguably one of the best Cannon Group films of the 80s," praising its "intricate costuming and elaborate sets" as well as the comedic vigor of Peter and David Paul who are "clearly having a great time here". Hartman felt that the special features were lacking, even if the audio commentary is informative and fun. He gave the film 3.5 stars out of 5. Brian Orndorf of Blu-Ray.com similarly praised Paul brothers' "distinct sibling chemistry and playfulness". He gave the film 3.5 stars out of 5 and praises the quality of the remaster, but gives a mediocre score for the special features.

== Footnotes ==
=== References ===
- Kinnard, Roy; Crnkovich, Tony (2017). Italian Sword and Sandal Films, 1908-1990. McFarland. p. 199. ISBN 978-1476662916.
- Willis, Donald C. (1997). Horror and Science Fiction Films IV. Scarecrow Press. ISBN 0-8108-3055-8.
