= Drew Peterson =

American police sergeant & convicted murderer (born 1954)

- Mugshot of Drew Peterson
- Born: Drew Walter Peterson; January 5, 1954 (age 72); Bolingbrook, Illinois, U.S.
- Occupation: Former police officer
- Spouses: Carol Brown (m. 1974; div. 1980) Vicki Connolly (m. 1982; div. 1992) Kathleen Savio (m. 1992; div. 2003) Stacy Ann Cales (m. 2003, missing since 2007)
- Children: 6
- Status: Incarcerated
- Convictions: Premeditated murder in the 2004 death of Kathleen Savio, solicitation of murder for hire in the attempted murder of James Glasgow
- Penalty: 78 years imprisonment; earliest possible release May 7, 2081

Drew Walter Peterson (born January 5, 1954) is an American convicted murderer and former Bolingbrook, Illinois, police sergeant who was found guilty in 2012 of the murder of his third wife, Kathleen Savio, a few months after their 2003 divorce. Peterson first received national publicity in 2007 when his fourth wife, Stacy Ann (Cales) Peterson, disappeared. Although the police and Stacy Ann's family suspect foul play, she has never been found.

Suspicions in Stacy Ann's case were fueled in part by the death of Savio, whose bruised body was found in a dry bathtub in her home in 2004 with a large gash to her scalp. Initially, Savio's official cause of death was found to be accidental drowning. In 2009, in light of Stacy Ann's disappearance, Peterson was indicted for Savio's murder after a second autopsy showed evidence of a struggle. Upon conviction, he was sentenced to thirty-eight years in prison on February 21, 2013.

On February 9, 2015, Peterson was charged with two additional felonies—solicitation of murder and solicitation of murder for hire—for attempting to have James Glasgow, the state's attorney handling his prosecution, killed. Peterson was convicted on May 31, 2016, and sentenced to an additional forty years on July 29, 2016. On February 21, 2017, he was transferred from Illinois Department of Corrections custody to the United States Penitentiary in Terre Haute, Indiana. In December 2019, Peterson was transferred to an undisclosed out-of-state facility.

== Personal life ==
Drew Peterson was born in Bolingbrook, Illinois, a suburb of Chicago, on January 5, 1954. He graduated in 1972 from Willowbrook High School in Villa Park, Illinois, where he ran cross country. He joined the United States Army after graduation and briefly attended the College of DuPage in 1974 before moving to Falls Church, Virginia, to train as a military police officer. Peterson began his thirty-year career with the local Bolingbrook police force in 1977. In 1978, he was assigned to the Metropolitan Area Narcotics Squad, and in 1979 he received a "Police Officer of the Year" award from the department. Peterson retired in November 2007 at age 53 with the rank of sergeant and was given a (tax-free) $79,000-a-year pension. His pension was terminated following his second conviction in May 2016.

== Marriages ==
=== Carol Brown ===
Peterson met Carol Brown in high school and they attended his senior prom together. They married in 1974, but divorced six years later after Brown learned about Peterson's infidelity. Together they had sons Stephen Paul Peterson (1980) and Eric Drew Peterson.

=== Vicki Connolly ===
Peterson married his second wife, Victoria "Vicki" Connolly, in 1982. They operated a bar together in Romeoville. Connolly alleged enduring domestic violence during their decade-long marriage, including threats that Peterson "knew how to kill her and make it look like an accident." Her daughter, Lisa Ward, who lived with them from ages 8 to 18, reported physical and psychological abuse from Peterson. The marriage ended in 1992 after Connolly discovered Peterson was having an affair with Kathleen Savio, whom he later married. Their divorce was finalized on February 18, 1992.

=== Kathleen Savio ===
Peterson married Kathleen Savio (born June 13, 1963, in Glendale Heights, Illinois), an accountant, on May 3, 1992, just a few months after his divorce from Connolly. Together they had two sons, Thomas (January 5, 1993) and Kristopher (August 8, 1994). During their marriage, the couple lived at 392 Pheasant Chase Drive in Bolingbrook. Their divorce was finalized on October 10, 2003. It was reported that between 2002 and 2004, police were called to the Peterson house eighteen times on domestic disturbance calls, including calls for returning children late after visitation.

On March 1, 2004, Savio's nude body was found in a dry bathtub in the primary suite of the home. Less than a month later, Peterson put the house up for sale. He did not mention Savio's death to the new owners, claiming he was only selling the house because his children enjoyed swimming in the pool at his secondary residence down the street.

Savio's death was initially ruled an accidental drowning by a coroner's jury that included a police officer who personally knew Peterson and assured other jurors that he was a good man who would never hurt his wife. However, following Stacy Peterson's later disappearance, Savio's body was exhumed and underwent forensic examination on November 16, 2007. Michael Baden, a former New York City medical examiner who conducted the examination at the request of Savio's relatives and Fox News, concluded that she died of drowning following a struggle when her body was placed in the bathtub. Postmortem photos showed extensive bruising and scraping to her back, torso, and face, as well as a large, unexplained gash in her scalp. The results of the official autopsy ordered by the county have not been released to the public. Will County State's Attorney James Glasgow told the press that, after examining evidence in the case, he believed that the death was a "homicide staged to look like an accident". On February 21, 2008, Glasgow announced that a pathologist had determined that Savio's death was a homicide, adding that the death had been investigated as such since reopening the case following the exhumation.

Reverend Neil Schori, a pastor at Stacy Peterson's church, reported that Stacy had told him that Drew had killed Savio and had made it look like an accident, and that she was afraid of her husband. Stacy had provided Drew's alibi for his whereabouts on the evening of Savio's death. Peterson's trial, proceeding in July 2012, was jeopardized when prosecutors attempted to introduce evidence that was not allowed. The Chicago Tribune reported that the judge would rule on a mistrial on August 2, 2012. On August 15, Peterson told a judge that he wanted to withdraw a request for a mistrial. His lawyers said that he wanted the current jury to decide if he killed his third wife. On September 6, Peterson was convicted of killing Savio. On February 21, 2013, he was denied a mistrial and sentenced to 38 years in prison.

=== Stacy Ann Peterson ===
Stacy Ann Cales
- Born: January 20, 1984; Downers Grove, Illinois
- Disappeared: October 28, 2007 (aged 23); Bolingbrook, Illinois
- Status: Missing for 19 years and 5 days
- Education: Joliet Junior College
- Occupation: Hotel receptionist

At age 49, Peterson married 19-year-old hotel receptionist Stacy Ann Cales (born January 20, 1984, in Downers Grove, Illinois) on October 18, 2003, and she subsequently changed her last name to Peterson. Stacy's mother Christie had previously been reported missing in 1998 (although the two cases are not believed to be linked). Described as a troubled teenager, Cales began dating Peterson at age 17 with her father's permission, while Peterson was still married to Kathleen Savio. The couple lived at 6 Pheasant Chase Court in Bolingbrook, Illinois, less than a mile from the home he formerly shared with Savio. Together they had two children, Anthony (born 2003) and Lacy (born 2005). Stacy legally adopted Savio's children, and treated them like they were her own. She was close to completing her nursing degree from Joliet Junior College at the time of her disappearance on Sunday, October 28, 2007. Stacy was officially reported missing in the early hours of Monday, October 29, after her sister, Cassandra Cales, failed to hear from her when expected. Peterson claims that Stacy called him at 9 p.m. on Sunday to tell him that she had left him for another man and that she had left her 2002 Pontiac Grand Am at Bolingbrook's Clow International Airport. Stacy is still considered a missing person. Her family has launched a website to help find her. While talking with Marcia Clark during Marcia Clark Investigates The First 48, defense attorney Joel Brodsky claimed to know what happened to Stacy and that he believes that after Drew passes away, Stacy will be found. However, he refused to elaborate further.

== Legal trouble and murder trial ==
Several leads were followed in the investigation by Illinois State Police with FBI involvement. Four search warrants were issued and carried out on Peterson's property following Stacy's disappearance, including the seizure of his firearms and both his and Stacy's vehicles. Peterson announced his plans to retire as a Bolingbrook police sergeant effective December 2007. On November 15, the Bolingbrook Police Pension Board voted to allow Peterson to collect his pension of $6,067.71 per month, stating current law gave them no option, as he had not been convicted of a crime.

Rick Mims, Peterson's long-time friend, admitted that he and Peterson bought three blue plastic containers from a cable company where they both worked part-time in 2003, and provided photos of these containers to police. Mims also sold his story to tabloid newspapers for an undisclosed sum of money. Peterson's stepbrother, Thomas Morphey, who has a history of drug and alcohol addiction, attempted suicide two days after allegedly helping Peterson carry a plastic container from Peterson's Bolingbrook home to his SUV, fearing he may have helped dispose of Stacy's body. Neighbors reported seeing Peterson and another man hauling a 55-gallon barrel, large enough to hold a person, out of the house shortly after the disappearance.

Cassandra Cales, Stacy's sister, said she wanted Peterson to take a lie detector test about his knowledge of a blue container that she saw in his garage two days before Stacy disappeared. Joel Brodsky, Peterson's attorney, denied that any container was missing from Peterson's home. There were also reports of truckers referring to the containers, but their stories were treated as not credible after it was discovered that they had not been in the Bolingbrook area at the times they claimed.

=== 2008 media appearances ===
On January 23, 2008, Peterson and his attorney, Joel Brodsky, called in to the show of Chicago radio personality Steve Dahl, who had been lampooning Peterson since the case began. Brodsky suggested that Dahl host an on-air "dating game" with Peterson the following day, but WJMK managers and Dahl decided not to go through with it. Peterson appeared on CNN's Larry King Live on April 11, 2008, with Brodsky again present to advise which questions Peterson should answer. The interview reran on May 9, 2009, two days after Peterson's arrest. Peterson subsequently made guest appearances (including one from county jail) on radio station WLS-AM with Mancow Muller. After that radio appearance, Will County Judge Stephen White severely limited Peterson's access to the media.

=== 2008 engagement to Christina Raines ===
In December 2008, Peterson's publicist Glenn Selig confirmed Peterson was engaged to a 23-year-old, Christina Raines; she would have been his fifth wife. On January 30, 2009, it was made public that Raines had moved out of Peterson's house. Her father, Ernie Raines, had issued an ultimatum to his daughter out of concern about the way Peterson tried to control her and what he feared Peterson could do. Raines moved out of Peterson's home "when she came to her senses", calling the engagement a publicity stunt designed to keep Peterson in the media spotlight.

=== 2009 indictment for Savio murder ===
On May 7, 2009, Peterson was indicted by a Will County grand jury and arrested for the murder of Savio. Bail was set at $20 million. In October 2009, Peterson sued JP Morgan Chase for revoking a home equity credit line he wanted to use to pay legal expenses, claiming his income of "nearly $109,000 per year" was insufficient. In July 2010, Judge White ruled that Peterson would remain in the Will County Jail during his trial and appeals process. Prosecutors argued he could pose a danger if released.

On July 21, 2010, it was revealed that hearsay statements indicating Peterson killed two of his wives were not reliable enough for a jury to hear at his trial. After presiding over a lengthy hearing, Judge White issued in May a four-page sealed ruling obtained by the Daily Herald. White ruled that prosecutors proved Peterson killed both Savio and Stacy "by a preponderance of the evidence," but nearly all statements attributed to Stacy "do not provide sufficient safeguards of reliability." (The standard of proof in homicide cases is "beyond a reasonable doubt"; "preponderance of the evidence" is the standard for fact-finding on questions of admissibility of evidence, even in a criminal case.) Stacy's statements were crucial to the prosecution's case, as it lacked significant direct evidence. In April 2012, an Illinois appellate court ruled that prosecutors could use eight statements by the victim before her death and by Peterson's still-missing fourth wife Stacy before her disappearance, reversing White's earlier decision. Peterson's defense had contended that introduction of these alleged hearsay comments constituted a violation of his Sixth Amendment right to confront witnesses testifying against him.

The Illinois State Legislature attempted to help the prosecution with the passage of a new Illinois law, 725 ILCS 5/115-10.6, or "Drew's Law", which allows prosecutors to enter hearsay statements into evidence under certain conditions. Passed while investigators were looking for Stacy, the statute permits courts to consider statements from "unavailable witnesses" if prosecutors prove the witness was killed to prevent his or her testimony and that the hearsay statements are reliable. Analysis by the trial court under this new law led to eight out of fourteen hearsay statements being ruled inadmissible as insufficiently reliable. On appeal, however, the Court of Appeals reversed the trial court, ruling that the common law doctrine of forfeiture by wrongdoing, which is less restrictive than "Drew's Law", allowed the statements to be admitted.

On August 22, 2012, Jeff Pachter, a witness at Peterson's murder trial, said Peterson offered him $25,000 to hire someone to kill Savio and told him it would be a secret he would take to his grave.

=== Verdict ===
On September 6, 2012, Peterson was found guilty of the premeditated murder of Savio. Jurors admitted that the most compelling evidence was based on the hearsay statements allowed under "Drew's Law". On February 21, 2013, Peterson was sentenced to 38 years in prison for the murder of his third wife. He was incarcerated at Menard Correctional Center in Chester, Illinois, but later moved to the Federal Correctional Institution, Terre Haute in Terre Haute, Indiana. Within a month, he was attacked by another prisoner who hoped to sell his belongings on eBay.

After a number of appeals, on September 21, 2017, the Illinois Supreme Court upheld the conviction.

In December 2019, Peterson was released from federal custody and transferred to a state facility outside of Illinois. His location is not being disclosed for security reasons.

The Illinois Department of Corrections stated, "Drew Peterson has transferred from the Federal Bureau of Prisons to a state facility outside Illinois. He remains under the jurisdiction of the Illinois Department of Corrections. For safety and security purposes, the department does not discuss details concerning the placement of offenders who have transferred under the terms of the Interstate Corrections Compact Agreement."

In October 2021, Peterson filed a hand-written Petition for Post Conviction Relief with the Will County Circuit Clerk. The petition alleges, amongst other claims, that State's Attorney James Glasgow had intimidated witnesses during Peterson's 2012 murder trial. The petition also revealed Peterson's current location of incarceration: The Indiana State Prison in Michigan City, Indiana, where he is known as Inmate #279193.

=== 2015 murder-for-hire charges ===
On February 9, 2015, Peterson was charged with attempting to put a hit on James Glasgow, the Chicago-area lead prosecutor in his murder trial, after a fellow inmate tipped off prosecutors to the plan and wore a wire to capture evidence against Peterson. In May 2016, he was found guilty of solicitation of murder and solicitation of murder for hire. He was subsequently sentenced to an additional 40 years in prison.

=== Joel Brodsky's confidential information ===
In May 2022, it was revealed that Drew Peterson's former defense attorney, Joel Brodsky, is considering the release of confidential information protected by attorney-client privilege. Stacy Peterson's sister, Cassandra, was annoyed by the possibility that Brodsky could face legal penalties for revealing such information, which she felt may be needed to solve Stacy's cold case. Cassandra argued that she would stand by Brodsky and support his actions if he came forward. Brodsky had temporarily lost his legal license in 2019 (for reasons unrelated to the Drew Peterson case) and is under a continued gag order not to disclose anything Drew Peterson shared with him in confidentiality. It is unclear if Brodsky actually knows anything about the whereabouts of Stacy Peterson, although he has claimed that he does, stating, "I know everything about both of his wives – everything. I feel bad about Drew still not taking responsibility and Stacy still being missing. I'm thinking about maybe revealing what happened to Stacy and where she is."

== Films and documentaries ==
- The Drew Peterson crimes and suspicions were covered in the OWN series Dr. Phil, episode "A Killer Among Us", original air date: December 7, 2007.
- In June 2011, the cable television network Lifetime began filming Drew Peterson: Untouchable, depicting the events surrounding the death of Savio and the disappearance of Stacy. Rob Lowe portrayed Peterson in the film, Cara Buono portrayed Savio, and Kaley Cuoco portrayed Stacy. Peterson filed a cease-and-desist letter demanding that production on the movie be halted. The film originally aired on January 21, 2012.
- The story was covered in the Investigation Discovery documentary Drew Peterson: An American Murder Mystery, which premiered on August 27, 2017.
- The story was covered in Marcia Clark Investigates The First 48.
- This case has also been covered by the show Cellmate Secrets (Season 1 Episode 2). The episode was titled Drew Peterson. It originally aired on June 11, 2021, on Lifetime.
- Drew Peterson is the subject of a Dateline episode.
