= WGN (AM) =

- Chicago, Illinois; United States
- Broadcast area: Chicago metropolitan area
- Frequency: 720 kHz
- Branding: 720 WGN

Programming
- Format: Talk radio
- Affiliations: NewsNation; Chicago Blackhawks

Ownership
- Owner: Nexstar Media Group; (Tribune Media Company)
- Sister stations: WGN-TV

History
- First air date: May 19, 1922
- Former call signs: WDAP (1922–1924); WGN (1924–1928); WGN-WLIB (1928–1933)
- Call sign meaning: "World's Greatest Newspaper" (Chicago Tribune slogan)

Technical information
- Licensing authority: FCC
- Facility ID: 72114
- Class: A
- Power: 50,000 watts
- Transmitter coordinates: 42°0′42.1″N 88°2′7.26″W; 42°0′38.1″N 88°2′0.3″W (aux)

Links
- Public license information: Public file; LMS
- Webcast: Listen live
- Website: wgnradio.com

WGN (720 kHz) is a commercial AM radio station in Chicago, Illinois, featuring a talk radio format. WGN's studios are in the Chicago Loop, while its transmitter is in Elk Grove Village. WGN also features broadcasts of Chicago Blackhawks hockey, and Northwestern University college football and basketball.

WGN was founded in 1922 as WDAP. In 1924 it was acquired by the Chicago Tribune, whose "World's Greatest Newspaper" slogan served as the basis for the WGN call sign, and later the call sign of a television superstation. Tribune Broadcasting merged with Nexstar Media Group in 2019; the latter has owned WGN since.

WGN is a clear channel, Class A station, broadcasting with the maximum power of 50,000 watts, and using a non-directional antenna. During daytime, near-perfect ground conductivity gives WGN at least secondary coverage to almost two-thirds of Illinois (as far south as Springfield) as well as large slices of Wisconsin, Indiana, Michigan and Iowa. During nighttime skywave, with a good radio, it is audible over most of the Eastern and Central United States and Central Canada. The station also streams its programming on its website and supplies podcasts as well. WGN was previously responsible for the activation of the Chicago metropolitan area Emergency Alert System when hazardous weather alerts, disaster area declarations, and child abductions are issued; this is currently handled by WLS.

== History ==
=== WDAP ===
The station first signed on the air on May 19, 1922, among the earliest stations in Chicago. It was randomly issued the call sign WDAP, from a sequential roster of available call signs, to Mid West Radio Central, Inc. This corporation was headed by Thorne Donnelley and Elliott Jenkins.

WDAP was originally located in the Wrigley Building. The studios were moved to the Drake Hotel the following July. In mid-1923 ownership was transferred to the Board of Trade, and the next year the Whitestone Company, managers of the Drake Hotel, took control.

=== Chicago Tribune ===
The Chicago Tribune acquired WDAP, and on June 1, 1924, the call sign was changed to WGN. The call letters came from "World's Greatest Newspaper", a slogan used since 1911.

This was the second Tribune-affiliated radio station to hold the WGN call letters. The original WGN began operating on the evening of March 29, 1924, after the newspaper took over programming of the former WJAZ. The WGN call sign had been assigned to a Great Lakes vessel, SS Carl D. Bradley. However the ship's skipper (and namesake) agreed to relinquish it in order to free it for adoption by the newspaper. The ship's call sign was changed to KFSI.

=== Shows and programming ===
Early programming was noted for its creativity and innovation. It included live music, political debates, comedy routines, and some of radio's first sporting event broadcasts, including the 1924 Indianapolis 500, and a live broadcast of the 1925 Scopes trial from Dayton, Tennessee. Wallace M Rogerson conducted the Keep Fit to Music programme. In 1926, WGN broadcast Sam & Henry, a daily serial with comic elements created and performed by Freeman Gosden and Charles Correll. After a dispute with the station in 1927, Gosden and Correll took the program's concept and announcer Bill Hay across town to WMAQ and created the first syndicated radio show, Amos 'n' Andy.

By the fall of 1928, the owners of the Tribune company and its sister publication, Liberty magazine, controlled two stations in addition to WGN in the Chicago area: WLIB and WTAS. On September 1, 1928, the Federal Radio Commission (FRC) ruled that this was two stations too many, and ordered that their operations be consolidated. WTAS was deleted, and the other two stations were merged with a dual call letter assignment of WGN-WLIB, although the latter call sign would be rarely if ever used. On May 15, 1933, after the FRC requested that stations using only one of their assigned call letters drop those that were no longer in regular use, WLIB was eliminated and the station reverted to just WGN.

=== CBS and Mutual Broadcasting System ===
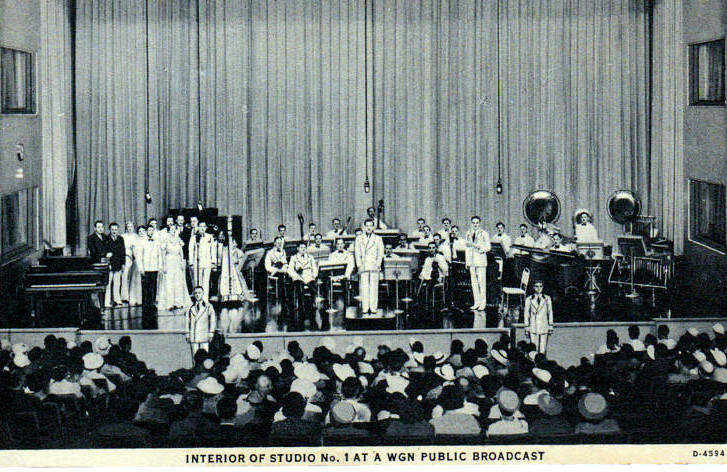
WGN's main studio in the Tribune Tower, c. 1930s -1940s. It could seat 600 people.

On November 1, 1931, WGN's network affiliation changed from NBC to CBS as a result of NBC's purchase of a half-interest in WMAQ, which then became Chicago's NBC station. During this period, Count Cutelli installed one of the most advanced sound effects system to date into the WGN studios, the same system used in Hollywood films.

In 1934, WGN became a founding member of the Mutual Broadcasting System. WGN joined with WOR in New York City, WXYZ in Detroit and WLW in Cincinnati to form the network, a rival to NBC and CBS. During the "Golden Age of Radio", Mutual was the home of The Lone Ranger, The Adventures of Superman and The Shadow. For many years, it was a national broadcaster for Major League Baseball, the National Football League and Notre Dame football.

In the fall of 1937, WGN was one of several Chicago radio stations to donate airtime to Chicago Public Schools for a pioneering program in which the school district provided elementary school students with distance education amid a polio outbreak-related school closure.

In 1939, Carole Mathews, the "Miss Chicago" of 1938, launched a WGN radio program entitled Breakfast Time with Carole Mathews. It ended later that year when she left the station for an acting career in Hollywood.

=== FM and TV stations ===
In May 1940, the Federal Communications Commission (FCC) announced the establishment, effective January 1, 1941, of an FM radio band operating on 40 channels spanning 42–50 MHz. In July 1941, WGN was given tentative permission to operate FM station W59C on 45.9 MHz, pending the outcome of an FCC review whether newspaper ownership of radio stations should be restricted. Effective November 1, 1943, the FCC modified its policy for FM call signs, and the station's call letters were changed to WGNB.

On June 27, 1945, the FCC announced the reassignment of the FM band to 80 channels from 88 to 106 MHz, which was soon expanded to 100 channels from 88 to 108 MHz. For most of its broadcasts on the new band, WGNB was located on 98.7 MHz. Its schedule was primarily a simulcast of the AM station, with some FM-only music shows broadcast as well. But with few people owning FM radio receivers in that era, management did not think WGNB would become profitable. Therefore, WGN, Inc. turned in WGNB's license for cancellation, and the station was deleted on May 28, 1953. The next year another Chicago station, WFMT, moved to the vacated 98.7 assignment.

In 1946, the Tribune Company applied to the FCC for a construction permit to build a television station. On April 5, 1948, WGN-TV Channel 9 signed on the air. Because CBS, NBC and ABC had their own network stations in Chicago, WGN-TV became an independent television station, responsible for most of its own programming or airing old movies and syndicated TV shows.

=== Change in ownership ===
After McCormick died from pneumonia-related complications on April 1, 1955, ownership of WGN-AM-TV, the Chicago Tribune and the News Syndicate Company properties transferred to the McCormick-Patterson Trust, assigned to the Robert R. McCormick Tribune Foundation in the names of the non-familial heirs of McCormick (whose two marriages never produced any children) and familial heirs of Patterson. (The trust was dissolved in January 1975, with a majority of the trust's former beneficiaries, including descendants of the McCormick and Patterson families, owning stock in the restructured Tribune Company entity – which assumed oversight of all properties previously overseen by the trust – afterward.)

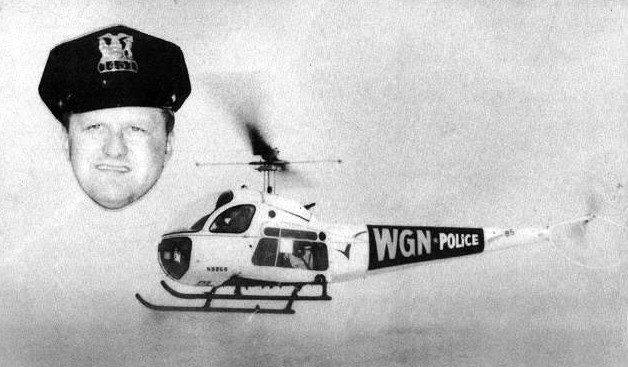
Officer Baldy and the WGN traffic copter in 1959.

In November 1958, WGN became the first radio station in Chicago to broadcast helicopter traffic reports featuring Police Officer Leonard Baldy. Flying Officer Baldy was killed in a helicopter crash, while on duty, on May 2, 1960. Eleven years later, WGN suffered another helicopter-related tragedy when Flying Officer Irv Hayden and his pilot were killed on August 10, 1971, after their helicopter struck a utility pole in the Chicago suburb of Bellwood.

=== Move to North Center ===
In 1961, the WGN radio and television stations moved to a studio facility on West Bradley Place in the North Center neighborhood, a move undertaken for civil defense concerns to provide the station a safe base to broadcast in case of a hostile attack targeting downtown Chicago. WGN radio moved back to North Michigan Avenue in 1986, relocating its operations to a studio in the Pioneer Court extension (WGN-TV remained at the Bradley Place facility, where that station operates to this day). The former WGN annex onto Tribune Tower is now used as a retail space containing Dylan's Candy Bar.

Over many decades, WGN was a "full service" radio station. The station played small amounts of music during the mornings and afternoon, moderate amounts of music on weekends during the day, aired midday and evening talk shows, and sports among other features. The station aired middle of the road (MOR) music until the 1970s, when its switched to more of an adult contemporary-type sound. Music programming was phased out during the 1980s, and by 1990, the station's lineup mainly consisted of talk shows.

=== Past personalities ===
Some former personalities on WGN include longtime morning hosts Wally Phillips, Bob Collins, Spike O'Dell, Paul Harvey and Roy Leonard. Orion Samuelson had been the station's farm reporter since 1960, he retired in 2020. Late-night hosts over the years have included Franklyn MacCormack, Ed "Chicago Eddie" Schwartz, and the husband-and-wife team of Steve King and Johnnie Putman.

The Sousa Archives and Center for American Music at the University of Illinois at Urbana–Champaign holds the WGN Radio Station Studio Orchestra Music Library and Records, 1925–1956, which consists of scripts, programs, production notes, correspondence, music library rental records, sheet music manuscripts, and music scores with annotations that document the WGN Studio Symphonic Orchestra from 1925 to 1956.

=== Controversial management ===
WGN continues to recover from the controversial rule of former Tribune head Randy Michaels, who resigned under pressure in 2010 amid allegations of inappropriate and sexist behavior in the workplace, and former WGN Program Director Kevin Metheny. Industry observers described Metheny's tenure as one that nearly destroyed the venerable WGN, with staff moves that included replacing a popular evening host with radio rookie Jim Laski, a Chicago politician and convicted felon.

Metheny and Laski were both fired weeks after Michaels was forced to resign by a Tribune board of directors facing spiraling losses at the hands of Michaels' management style. In 2005, Tom Langmyer was appointed as vice president and general manager of WGN.

On April 30, 2008, the station entered into a three-year deal to broadcast Chicago Blackhawks hockey games through the 2010–2011 season.

=== New ownership ===
On April 1, 2007, Chicago-based real estate investor Sam Zell announced plans to purchase the Tribune Company in an $8.2-billion leveraged buyout that gave Tribune employees stock and effective ownership of the company. The transaction and concurring privatization of the company was completed upon termination of Tribune stock at the close of trading on December 20, 2007. Prior to the sale's closure, WGN-TV was one of two commercial television stations in the Chicago market, not counting network-owned stations, to have never been involved in an ownership transaction (along with WCIU-TV, which has been owned by Weigel Broadcasting since its February 1964 sign-on). On December 8, 2008, Tribune filed for Chapter 11 bankruptcy protection, citing a debt load of around $13 billion – making it the largest media bankruptcy in American corporate history – that it accrued from the Zell buyout and related privatization costs as well as a sharp downturn in revenue from newspaper advertising. After a protracted four-year process, on December 31, 2012, Tribune formally exited from bankruptcy under the control of its senior debt holders, Oaktree Capital Management, JPMorgan Chase and Angelo, Gordon & Co.

On July 10, 2013, Tribune announced plans to split off its broadcasting and newspaper interests into two separate companies. WGN-TV and WGN Radio would remain with the original entity, which was renamed Tribune Media and was restructured to focus on the company's broadcasting, digital and real estate properties; the newspaper division – which, in addition to the Chicago Tribune, included publications such as the Los Angeles Times, the South Florida Sun-Sentinel and the Baltimore Sun – was spun off into the standalone entity Tribune Publishing (known as Tronc from June 2016 until the company reverted to its former name in October 2018). The split was completed on August 4, 2014, ending the Tribune's joint ownership with WGN-TV and WGN Radio after 66 and 94 years, respectively. However, WGN-TV continues to maintain a content partnership with the Tribune.

=== Programming changes ===
In October 2008, WGN-TV began to provide forecasts for WGN radio (prepared by Tom Skilling and other members of the sister television station's weather staff), after it ended a ten-year forecast partnership with The Weather Channel. That year, morning host Spike O'Dell retired from radio; WGN then moved the station's midday host at the time, John Williams to the morning slot. Williams' former timeslot, 1-4 p.m. was left vacant for several months, with the station's other radio hosts filling in on a rotating basis – including weekend host Nick Digilio, and Bob Sirott, who formerly hosted "The Noon Show" on the same station, in addition to a weekend program that is pre-recorded with his wife, Marianne Murciano (Sirott was also a prominent news anchor at NBC owned-and-operated station WMAQ-TV, channel 5, and later at Fox-owned WFLD, channel 32).

In March 2009, longtime Chicago radio host Garry Meier was given an audition for the 1-4 p.m. slot. Meier hosted four shows, which is believed to have caused a surge in interest among younger people, who traditionally rarely listened to WGN. Chicago media message boards exploded with traffic and posts, many excited over a possible permanent Meier presence on the station. After the four Meier auditions, Jerry Springer was given a four-day stint as "guest host", followed by Rita Cosby a few weeks later. On April 2, 2009, WGN announced that Meier would join the station full-time as host of a program in the 1-4 p.m. slot (airing most weekdays when the program is not pre-empted by Chicago Cubs broadcasts); his first official show occurred that same day. On May 22, 2009, WGN announced the cancellation of The Kathy and Judy Show effective after that day's broadcast. The final show was largely a retrospective of the program's 20 years on WGN radio; this occurred shortly after the replacement of much of the station's weekend lineup.

On June 15, 2009, the station announced that Greg Jarrett would become its new morning-drive host starting on June 22, with John Williams being shifted to Kathy and Judy's former late morning timeslot. In June 2010, WGN announced the hiring of longtime Cincinnati-based host Mike McConnell from WLW for the late morning (8:30 a.m.-12:30 pm) slot, shifting Williams back to his original midday time slot (now from 12:30-3:00 pm) on August 9, 2010.

Coinciding with the hire of Jarrett, WGN dropped its "News/Talk 720" brand and began identifying itself simply as "Chicago's WGN Radio 720". This new identity was implemented in all station promos, and used by all on-air talent. On August 13, 2010, the station's branding changed again to "News 720 WGN". In November, after the firing of controversial program director Kevin Metheny, Tom Langmyer instructed staff to identify the station as "720 WGN". Weekend hosts Jerry Agar and the "News Junkie" Sean Wasson left the station, in a shift towards more general and less controversial talk programming.

On December 2, 2011, WGN announced that Jonathon Brandmeier was named the new morning drive time host, effective December 9. With Brandmeier's addition to WGN radio's weekday lineup, the morning drive timeslot shifted to 5:30-9 a.m., followed by Mike McConnell from 9 a.m.-12 p.m., John Williams from 12-3 p.m., and Garry Meier from 3-7 p.m. News anchor Steve Bertrand moved to mornings with Brandmeier and Jim Gudas shifted to the midday/afternoon slot. Former morning host Greg Jarrett was released from the station. Overnight hosts Steve King and Johnnie Putman left WGN on December 9 after a week-long series of live "Farewell Celebration" shows. Bill Leff took over the midnight to 5:30 a.m. slot on December 12. 2011.

In 2012, John Williams announced his departure from the station upon the December 31 expiration of his contract (leaving on December 21, 2012), to concentrate exclusively on his program on WCCO in Minneapolis instead of splitting time between stations. In October 2012, then back into Tribune Tower in October 2012. On December 17, 2012, WGN Radio executives announced that the long-running program "Extension 720", hosted by Dr. Milton J. Rosenberg, would end its 39-year run three days later on December 20.

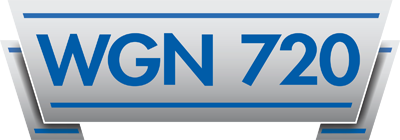
WGN logo c. 2013

In June 2013, Tribune Broadcasting CEO Larry Wert hired Jimmy DeCastro as WGN radio's president and general manager. In addition, Bob Sirott and Marianne Murciano's program moved to the weekday lineup and Steve Cochran was announced to be returning to WGN. The changes are an attempt to shift WGN closer to the programming format it had prior to Kevin Metheney and Randy Michaels' tenure with WGN and Tribune, while placing more emphasis on new media; this included the move of Mike McConnell's program to the station's secondary Internet radio station WGN Plus (formerly WGN-2) until the remainder of his contract was bought out around October 10, 2013, the move of Jonathon Brandmeier's morning show to a new station branded "The G" (subsequently rebranded as an additional Internet-only station, "WGN.FM") in favor of Cochran, and increased synergy with WGN-TV (including the replacement of WGN radio's "Voice of Chicago" slogan with WGN-TV's longtime slogan, "Chicago's Very Own"). On May 21, WGN Radio announced that their schedule would change again effective May 27, 2014, which included the return of John Williams to the station; he would host his program from Minneapolis, where he continued to do an afternoon show for WCCO. His time slot announced was 10:00 a.m. to noon, which moved then mid morning hosts Bill Leff and Wendy Snyder to the afternoon drive from 3:00-7:00 pm. Garry Meier would be moved to WGN.FM, with Steve Cochran's morning show getting expended by 1 hour, and Bob Sirott and Marianne Murciano still having their noon-3:00 p.m. show.

=== Chicago Cubs leave WGN ===
On June 5, 2014, the Chicago Cubs announced that radio broadcasts of its games would move from WGN to WBBM for the 2015 season under a seven-year deal. The deal ended the team's 90-year association with WGN.

On November 20, 2014, Chicago media blogger Robert Feder reported that WGN management planned to end operation of both WGWG-LP and internet station WGN.FM on December 31, 2014. Jonathan Brandmeier and Garry Meier were released and their programs canceled immediately, with repeat shows airing through the end of December. While Brandmeier was reportedly not under contract with Tribune Media at the time of his release, Meier's contract with Tribune continued through September 2015.

On December 31, 2014, the WGN.FM website was redirected to the WGN Plus website, where Tribune offers various digital media content. WGWG-LP began an interim simulcast of WGN radio at 10 p.m. on December 31, 2014. The Chicago Tribune reported that the simulcast would continue through January 2015, after which Chicago-based Weigel Broadcasting was expected to assume operation of 87.7 FM; Weigel eventually began programming what is now WRME-LD on February 23, 2015.

On October 5, 2016, Jimmy DeCastro announced he was planning to leave WGN at the end of the month. He told Robert Feder "I've done everything I can to respect and build on the legacy of this amazing place, and I believe I accomplished everything I set out to do." At the time of his leaving he had spent 3 1/2 years serving as the President and general manager of WGN. His last day at WGN was October 31. He said he plans to focus on The Content Factory, his Evanston-based national syndication and new media company, and to expand into the area of sports representation. Larry Wert has said he has not decided on naming a successor to DeCastro, so for now the sales and programming operations will report directly to Wert.

On July 25, 2017, it was reported that WGN would leave Tribune Tower in 2018 and relocate to a new studio and office across the Chicago River. The station began using its new studios on Wacker Drive for news reports in May 2018, with the final show originating from Tribune Tower on June 18, 2018.

=== Chicago White Sox broadcasts ===
On February 14, 2018, WGN was named the new flagship station of the Chicago White Sox, who were left without a station after Cumulus Media voided their contract to air on WLS as part of their Chapter 11 bankruptcy filing. The agreement was for three years, and the team moved to WMVP in the 2022 season.

=== Acquisition of Tribune by Nexstar ===
Tribune Media was acquired by Nexstar Media Group for $4.1 billion in September 2019, marking the first time since 1924 that WGN radio would not be owned by any iteration of the Tribune Company. The sale made WGN the only radio property owned by Nexstar, which primarily owns television stations; in an interview with Crain's Chicago Business in December 2018, shortly after the deal was announced, Nexstar CEO Perry Sook stated that he "doesn't have an allergic reaction to radio" and that there were no immediate plans to sell WGN radio, adding that he did not expect Nexstar to acquire additional radio stations.

Under Nexstar, several changes were made to the station's lineup, management, and branding. Bob Sirott was hired to replace Steve Cochran during morning rush hour, longtime mid-day duo Bill Leff and Wendy Snyder were ousted, and at a later date, evening host Justin Kaufmann was let go as well. These staffing changes were made over the course of months after Sean Compton began to oversee radio operations as Nexstar's Executive Vice President of WGN America, WGN Radio & Director of Content Acquisition. Morning producer Mary Boyle was appointed general manager of the station after former Station Manager Todd Manley was terminated on the first day of Nexstar's takeover. Veteran Chicago News Anchor Bill Kurtis was replaced in his role as voiceover talent by New York-based voiceover artist Steve Kamer. Similarly, new radio jingles from JAM Creative Productions and sister company PAMS of Dallas were introduced to the station. Cuts from JAM jingle packages Top News, Talktrax, Talking Points, Non-Stop Power, You'll Like Our Style, Follow The Leader, Variety Pack, Nothing But Class, Ameritalk, and (rarely) The Only One are regularly featured in station identifications, sounders, and promotions. WGN also dropped hourly news updates from ABC News Radio and instead is supplying national news updates for WGN America's national newscast, NewsNation with WGN newscasters and audio from Nexstar-owned television stations.

== Programming ==
Local hosts on WGN include morning host Bob Sirott along with John Williams, John Records Landecker, and Rollye James.

WGN is one of the few talk stations in the U.S. to broadcast all local talk shows during the day and evening. In recent years, it has added some nationally syndicated talk shows at night. Monday through Friday, it carries The Other Side of Midnight with Lionel from Red Apple Media during late night. On Sundays it runs Sunday Night Live with Bill Cunningham from WLW in Cincinnati. WGN was the longtime Chicago outlet for Paul Harvey from 1951 until his death on February 28, 2009. Harvey's news and commentary shows were carried nationally by ABC Radio, although he was based in Chicago and the programs aired locally on WGN.

WGN airs local news headlines, weather forecasts supplied by WGN-TV, traffic reports and sports headlines every half-hour on weekdays, and every hour nights and weekends. Also during weekdays, the radio station simulcasts the first two hours of the WGN Morning News. The station used ABC News Radio for national news reports as the network's Chicago affiliate. On September 1, 2020, WGN Radio dropped ABC News Radio in favor of being an "audio news hub" for the co-owned NewsNation TV channel.

=== Sports teams ===
WGN serves as the flagship radio outlet for Chicago Blackhawks hockey, Northwestern Wildcats football, and Northwestern Wildcats men's basketball. For the 2018 and 2019 seasons, WGN was the flagship station for Chicago White Sox baseball. WLS previously had the contract to carry the White Sox, but its parent company, Cumulus Media, ran into financial problems and gave up the rights to White Sox broadcasts. With the 2020 season, WMVP became the White Sox flagship radio outlet. As of 2024, WGN continues to air overflow White Sox games if the Chicago Bears are playing on WMVP.

WGN had a long association with the MLB Chicago Cubs from 1925 to 2014, the last 56 years of that period as the exclusive flagship station. Following the 2014 season, Cubs radio broadcasts moved to WBBM. (They are currently heard on WSCR, co-owned with WBBM.)

Shortly after Nexstar took control of WGN, the station began to broadcast national NFL play-by-play on Sunday afternoons from Compass Media Networks.

== Broadcast coverage ==
WGN (AM) transmits a non-directional signal from a 195° (longer than half-wave) 740-foot tower in Elk Grove Village. Its daytime signal stretches across five states: Illinois, Iowa, Wisconsin, Indiana, and Michigan. At night its signal spreads north to Hudson Bay, south to the Gulf of Mexico, west to Colorado, and east to the Atlantic Ocean.

== Notable former on-air personalities ==
- Jonathon Brandmeier
- Bob Collins
- Roe Conn
- Nick Digilio
- Suzanne Le Mignot
- Garry Meier
- Marianne Murciano
- Spike O'Dell
- Wally Phillips

== See also ==
- List of initial AM-band station grants in the United States
- List of three-letter broadcast call signs in the United States
