= Cisco Cotto =

American pastor and radio personality

- Born: (1975); Aurora, Illinois, U.S.
- Education: Western Illinois University; Moody Bible Institute (M.Div.); Biola University (M.A. D.Min.)
- Occupations: News anchor, Pastor

Cisco Cotto (born 1975) is a radio personality and pastor, serving as morning anchor on WBBM 780/105.9 and campus pastor at Village Bible Church in Naperville, Illinois.

== Education ==
Cotto graduated from Western Illinois University in 1998 and earned a Master of Divinity from Moody Bible Institute in 2010. He also earned a Master of Arts in Christian Apologetics and Doctor of Ministry from Biola University.

== Career ==
Cotto began his radio career working as an intern for Moody Radio while he was in high school. While studying at Western Illinois University, he worked as a reporter at WIUM and WIUW. He was awarded the Illinois News Broadcasters Association's Bill Miller Scholarship in 1997 for his work at WIUM and WIUW. He was hired as a news reporter at AM 670 WMAQ in 1998. In February 2000, Cotto left WMAQ to join AM 890 WLS as a news reporter and anchor. Cotto left WLS in 2006, and on October 5 he joined AM 560 WIND as co-host of the station's morning drive program, alongside Big John Howell. On March 19, 2009, Cotto moderated "The Great Debate", alongside WCPT's Dick Kay, which featured Thom Hartmann representing the liberal viewpoint and Michael Medved representing the conservative viewpoint, and was hosted by WIND and WCPT.

In 2010, Cotto rejoined WLS, initially co-hosting afternoons with Roe Conn, but after one month he was given his own show late mornings. Cotto was replaced in his late morning slot by Bruce Wolf and Dan Proft in 2011. After leaving WLS, Cotto began the process of starting Village Church of Oak Park, which opened the following year.

In 2014, Cotto was hired as an anchor and reporter at WBBM 780/105.9. Cotto won the Illinois Associated Press Broadcast Association award for best newscast in 2016.

Cotto has appeared as a news reporter in the TV series Chicago Fire and Chicago P.D..
