= Outing Riley =

Outing Riley (aka If Dad Only knew)
- Theatrical release poster
- Directed by: Pete Jones
- Written by: Pete Jones
- Produced by: Judd Nissen; Patrick Peach; Bruce Terris
- Starring: Pete Jones; Nathan Fillion; Stoney Westmoreland; Dev Kennedy; Michael McDonald
- Cinematography: Peter Biagi
- Edited by: Gregg Featherman
- Music by: Rick Butler; Fred Rapaport
- Distributed by: Wolfe Releasing
- Release date: October 10, 2004
- Running time: 99 minutes
- Country: United States
- Language: English
- Budget: $700,000

Outing Riley is a 2004 comedy film about a gay man coming out to his three brothers written, directed, and starring Pete Jones. It was screened at the 2004 Chicago International Film Festival and released on video in 2007. The movie was subsequently renamed If Dad Only Knew.

== Plot ==
Bobby Riley (Pete Jones) is a gay man in the closet, afraid to come out to his three older brothers even though he's over 30, makes his own money and lives on his own. He's being pressed by his more liberal sister, his boyfriend, and his lesbian beard to tell them. The death of his father and a fishing trip with his brothers provide occasions when he could tell them but he fails. The expectations of a close-knit Irish Catholic family in Chicago are hard for him to overcome. Eventually all the family's secrets are revealed - his brothers' as well as Bobby's - and the siblings all grow closer in the process.

== Cast ==
- Pete Jones as Bobby Riley
- Nathan Fillion as Luke Riley
- Stoney Westmoreland as Connor Riley
- Dev Kennedy as Jack Riley
- Michael McDonald as Andy
- Julie Pearl as Maggie Riley
- Bob Riley as Mr. Riley
- Wendy Snyder as Smoking Woman
