= Jonathon Brandmeier =

American broadcaster (born 1956)

- Born: John Francis Brandmeier; July 15, 1956 (age 70); Fond du Lac, Wisconsin, U.S.
- Years active: 1973–present
- Spouse: Lisa Nicelli (m. 1982)
- Presenting career
- Show: Brandmeier Show
- Country: United States
- Website: BrandmeierShow.com

Jonathon "Johnny B" Brandmeier (born July 15, 1956) is a Chicago radio personality and musician.

== Career ==
Born John Francis Brandmeier to a German father and a Lebanese mother, Brandmeier started his radio career in 1973 at WFON in Fond du Lac, Wisconsin. When he was 18 he joined WOSH in Oshkosh, Wisconsin, later working as a DJ at WYNE (now WHBY) in Appleton, Wisconsin, then at KLIV in San Jose, California, then as the morning jock at WYBR-FM (now WXRX) in Rockford, Illinois, and then in 1980 at WOKY in Milwaukee. In February 1981, he was brought on as the KZZP morning DJ in Phoenix, Arizona, where he participated in prank phone calls and silly song parodies. In 1982, Brandmeier released his first album Just Havin' Fun.

WLUP ("The Loop") in Chicago hired him in 1983, where his morning show was broadcast on both the AM and FM stations. He formed and performed concerts with his band, "Johnny and the Leisure Suits". His most memorable songs include "We're All Crazy In Chicago" (a local Top Ten hit), "Hey Der Milwaukee Polka", and "The Moo-Moo Song" (based on an actual event in the 1980s when a local attempted to have sex with a cow in the Lincoln Park Zoo).

In April 1986, WBBM-TV aired his TV special "Johnny B. On TV". In 1989, he hosted Friday Night Videos with Phil Collins, and starred in the TV-movie "Thanksgiving Day" with Mary Tyler Moore. In 1990, he hosted two "Jonathon Brandmeier From Chicago" late night specials on NBC. In the summer of 1991, Viacom syndicated his "Johnny B. on the Loose".

A management change at WLUP in 1997, however, led to the end of Brandmeier's 14-year run on The Loop. He hosted middays from 1998 to 2001 at WCKG in Chicago, which was replayed in Los Angeles at KLSX. After some time away from radio, he hosted mornings at KCBS-FM from 2004 to 2005.

Brandmeier returned to WLUP in fall 2005, hosting mornings until 2009. He made several appearances with his band, The Leisure Suits, on what he called "World Tour 2007." This included playing bars and theaters in the Chicago area. In 2008, he released a live 2-CD set, Larger Than Live of his 2007 Christmas show in Rosemont, Illinois.

On December 9, 2011, Brandmeier began a three-year run at WGN Radio. He moved from WGN to the online-only WGN.FM in September 2013 (and later WGWG-LP 87.7 FM in February 2014), but the FM station shut down operations in December 2014.

On March 30, 2015, Brandmeier replaced Dennis Miller as the midday host on Westwood One's nationwide talk radio lineup on 100-plus affiliates, including airing on WLS (AM) in Chicago. Westwood One canceled the show on December 12, 2016, amid Brandmeier's dissatisfaction with network pressure on him to make the show a boilerplate conservative talk radio show.

Brandmeier was named as a Radio Hall of Fame inductee in June 2018.

On April 3, 2020, an email was sent to Jonathon Brandmeier fans entitled "You're not dreaming, we're streaming", informing them that Johnny and Buzz Kilman would be streaming the following day, April 4, 2020, at 10:00 a.m. Central on Johnny's website. Johnny and Buzz streamed live on April 4, 2020, amid network congestion, for a couple hours to the delight of fans. This weekly "Showcast" continued to air live every Saturday at 10AM Central time until May 22, 2021.

== Discography ==
Albums:

- Just Havin' Fun (1982)
- Almost Live (1984)
- Brandmeier (1989)
- Dink (1994)
- Larger Than Live (2008)

Singles:

1981:
- Johnny in the Morning (Just Havin' Fun) b/w Mick Jagger (What Makes Your Lips So Big?)
- The Snowbird Song b/w Did The Stones Show Up?
1983:
- Lookin' For A Livin' b/w Party Animals (Promotional release only)
- The Moo Moo Song b/w Party Animals
1986:
- We're All Crazy In Chicago b/w We're All Crazy In Chicago (Extended Mix)
