= Powerlifting USA =

American sports magazine

Powerlifter Scot Mendelson on the cover of Powerlifting USA

Powerlifting USA is an American international magazine covering the sport of powerlifting. The print issue magazine was published from June 1977 until May 2012 by Mike Lambert. The magazine featured powerlifting interviews, nutrition, training, meet results, and upcoming powerlifting competitions, as well as Top 100 rankings by weight class and men's and women's Top 50 rankings for the squat, bench press and deadlift.

== Staff ==
- Editor-In-Chief/Publisher - Mike Lambert
- Controller - In Joo Lambert
- Statistician - Herb Glossbrenner/Michael Soong after Herb retired. Herb was the original stat person for many years.
- Art Director - Kelly Anglin
