= Steve Dahl =

American radio personality (born 1954)

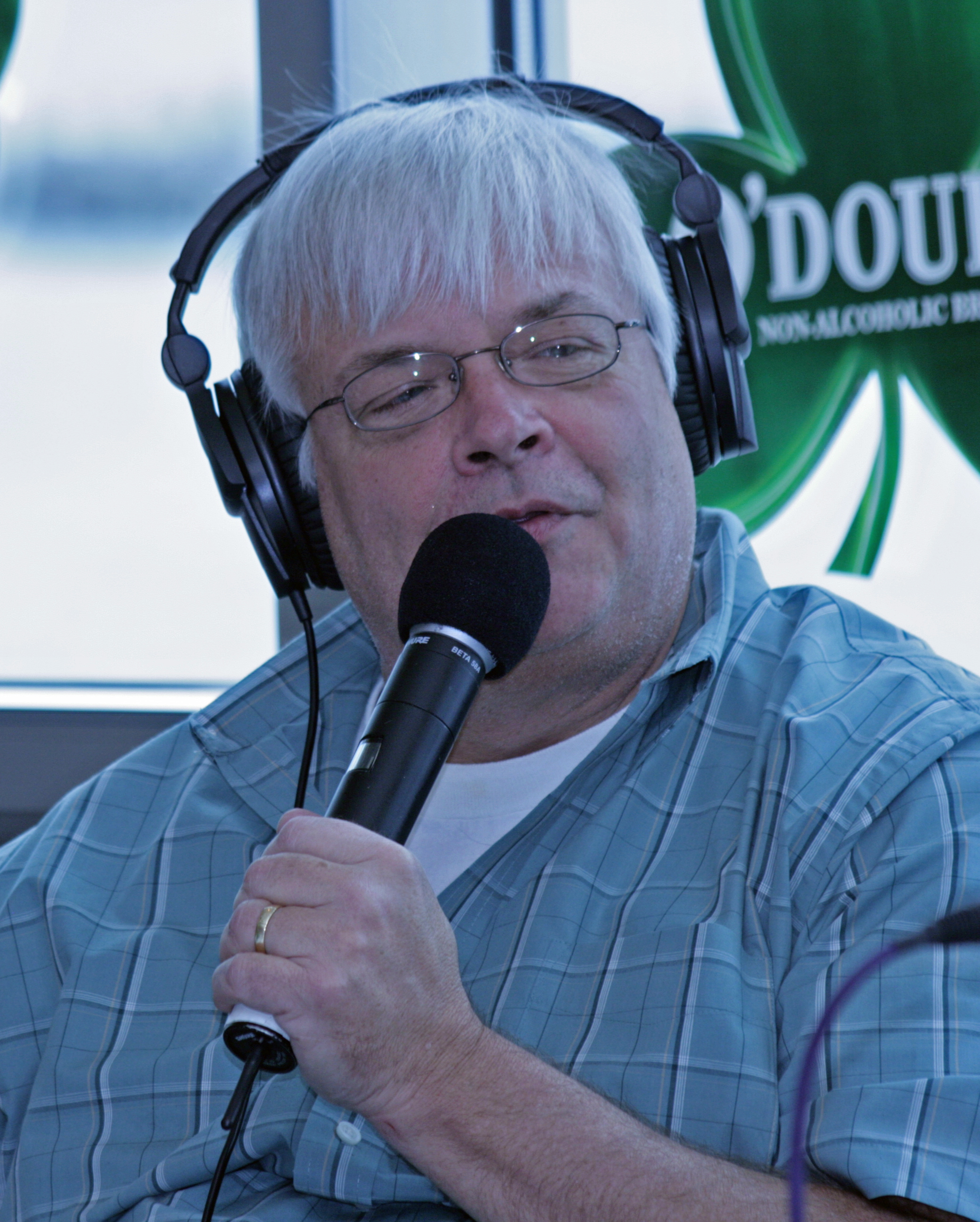
- Dahl in 2008
- Born: Steven Robert Dahl; November 20, 1954 (age 71); Pasadena, California, U.S.
- Spouse: Janet (m. 1978)
- Children: 3
- Website: Official website

Steven Robert Dahl (born November 20, 1954) is an American radio personality. He is the owner and operator of the Steve Dahl Network, a subscription-based podcasting network. Dahl gained a measure of national attention after organizing and hosting Disco Demolition Night at Comiskey Park.

Originally, Dahl broadcast with Detroit stations WABX and WWWW and later with Chicago stations WCKG, WDAI, WLUP, WMVP and WLS. He served as a columnist for the Chicago Tribune in their Live section as the resident "vice advisor" until November 2010. He is also known in Chicago for his longstanding former role as one half of the Steve & Garry team (with Garry Meier), and the two are members of the National Radio Hall of Fame. Dahl is considered an influential shock jock in talk radio.

In addition to his radio career, Dahl is a singer, songwriter, and guitarist. His band, Teenage Radiation, recorded and performed a number of song parodies (which he often played on his show throughout the 1980s) and since 1990 he has performed and recorded as Steve Dahl and the Dahlfins. Dahl is also an occasional actor, and has appeared in films such as Grandview, U.S.A., Outing Riley and I Want Someone to Eat Cheese With.

== Early life ==
Dahl grew up in La Cañada, California. He is the son of Roger and Carol Dahl, an electronics parts manufacturer's representative and a homemaker.

== Radio career ==
=== Early radio career ===
In the 9th grade, Dahl began hanging around a local underground radio station, KPPC, in his home state of California. At the age of sixteen, after he started working at the radio station full-time, he unofficially dropped out of high school. Dahl later explained, "I convinced my parents and the school that I would do an independent work-study thing. I never got around to it." At the age of eighteen, he obtained his GED and briefly married a woman he met after she called him on-air to request "Suzanne", a song by Leonard Cohen which told a tale of a troubled relationship. Dahl later explained his short-lived marriage by commenting, "I should have paid more attention to that song."

Dahl was told by radio executives that he'd never make it in radio because his voice was too high. At one point, Dahl was so discouraged that he quit for about six months and attempted to pursue a career as a recording engineer. However, this never amounted to anything more than making mix tapes of popular songs for play on airplanes. Throughout this time period, he was making efforts to reconcile with his ex-wife, who by then was dating the program director at the Los Angeles radio station where she worked. He later admitted to stalking her by sleeping in his Subaru outside her house.

In 1976, Dahl's ex-wife told him about an opening for a morning show in Detroit, Michigan on WABX. He managed to secure the job, despite the fact that he did not think he was good enough for it (he later learned that the station was owned by the same company his ex-wife worked for). At WABX, Dahl learned as much as he could about what constituted "good radio" and also began experimenting with his content. His popularity increased to the point that he achieved a 7.2 market share.

During his time at WABX, Dahl was introduced to Janet Joliat, a junior high school English and drama teacher in a Detroit suburb, who was casually dating a friend of his and was also a listener of his show. The two hit it off after Dahl invited her to a "hump day" broadcast he was doing from the camel area of the Detroit Zoo.

WDAI executives in Chicago, attracted by Dahl's 7.1 share, approached him and offered to double his salary to $50,000 a year. However, Janet did not want to leave her family in Detroit and he did not want to leave her. This prompted Dahl to ask his bosses for $35,000 a year to stay in Detroit, which they refused. In 1978, after Janet accepted his marriage proposal, Dahl left Detroit for WDAI in Chicago.

=== Rude Awakening ===
Dahl began at WDAI Chicago on February 23, 1978, with his solo Steve Dahl's Rude Awakening show, but it never achieved solid ratings despite media attention. Ten months later, on Christmas Eve, 1978, WDAI changed formats from rock to disco and fired Dahl.

=== Steve & Garry ===
In March 1979, after a few months without a job, Dahl was hired to do a morning show at WLUP where he met overnight DJ Garry Meier (who was then broadcasting under the pseudonym of "Matthew Meier"). Shortly thereafter, the two began a cross talk that eventually led to Meier being teamed up with Dahl as both sidekick and newsman. Dahl effectively forced Meier to use his actual name by calling him "Garry" on-air accidentally. After openly discussing the subject, again, on-air, Meier officially dropped his pseudonym.

==== Disco Demolition Night ====
In response to Dahl's firing from WDAI, Dahl and Meier mocked and heaped scorn on disco records and WDAI (calling it "Disco-D.I.E." mocking the station's slogan, "Disco-D.A.I.") on the air. Dahl pronounced the word disco with 'a contemptuous lisp'. Dahl even recorded and started playing a parody of Rod Stewart's "Da Ya Think I'm Sexy?", which he called "Do You Think I'm Disco?". The song was certified as a gold record, peaked at No. 58 on the Billboard Hot 100, and received airplay across the country.

During this same time period, Dahl and Meier, along with Mike Veeck (son of then Chicago White Sox owner Bill Veeck), Jeff Schwartz of WLUP Sales and Dave Logan, the WLUP Promotions Director, came up with a radio promotion and tie-in to the White Sox called Disco Demolition Night which took place on Thursday, July 12, 1979. The concept was to create an event to "end disco once and for all" in the center field of Comiskey Park that night by allowing people to get tickets at the box office if they brought $0.98 (for WLUP's frequency) and at least one disco record. More than 50,000 fans showed up, many loosely interpreting "disco record" to mean any disc with music by black artists. The records were collected, piled up on the field and blown up. As the second game of the doubleheader was about to begin, the raucous crowd stormed onto the field, refused to leave, and proceeded by setting fires, tearing out seats and pieces of turf, and other damage. American League President Lee MacPhail later declared the second game of the doubleheader a forfeit victory for the visiting Detroit Tigers. Six people reported minor injuries, and thirty-nine were arrested for disorderly conduct.

==== Height of collaboration ====
As a result of Disco Demolition Night, Dahl attained national recognition and his popularity increased significantly. He established a syndicate and the Steve & Garry show began airing in Detroit and Milwaukee, where it performed well. However, in February 1981, WLUP fired Dahl, citing "continued assaults on community standards". "It was going on in El Paso and Los Angeles, like, on Monday, and on Friday they fired me," Dahl later said. Meier was offered the opportunity to continue the show by himself, but he refused.

I always used to get ticked off when I would get lumped in with Howard Stern as being a shock jock. I guess I did shock people, but I did it unintentionally. It comes out of who I am.

— Steve Dahl

During the Iranian Hostage Crisis, Dahl, along with his backing band Teenage Radiation, recorded and released a parody of The Knack's song "My Sharona", called "Ayatollah". Released as a single, it reached No. 12 on the weekly Musicradio survey of Chicago superstation WLS-AM on February 9, 1980. He also made on-the-air prank phone calls to the "Islamic Fried Chicken" (a play on Kentucky Fried Chicken), ordering buckets of chicken for the hostages in the US embassy, for which the State Department later reprimanded him. Dahl also parodied the John Wayne Gacy murders with his song "Another Kid in the Crawl" (to the tune of Pink Floyd's "Another Brick in the Wall"). The playing of the song was stopped after parents of the murdered children called to complain.

Dahl and Meier won a local Emmy award for a television special they did in 1981 called, Greetings from Graceland, which was a comedy spoof on the tourist shrine and featured Elvis Presley's "Uncle Vester" selling Elvis cookbooks from the guardhouse. They briefly had a morning television show, called It's Too Early on local Chicago station, WFBN-TV, which nationally syndicated columnist Bob Greene called "the best program on television", "amazing", and "hypnotic" in his June 20, 1983 column. The show was canceled after four weeks on the air because it was deemed "unsuitable for general viewing... in particular for young children" after Dahl was shown fully clothed sitting on a toilet seat reading a newspaper.

In 1982, he stated on the air that motorists could allegedly substitute Necco Wafers for coins in automatic toll booths on Chicago's tollways. The Illinois Tollway System later said that approximately a dozen toll machines broke down due to people trying to use the candy to pay tolls.

Dahl decided to get a vasectomy in March 1989, which was performed live on the air at a urologist's office in Indiana. According to Arbitron ratings for that survey period, Dahl and Meier's ratings jumped from a tie for seventh place in afternoons to a tie for third place.

According to Paul D. Colford, a former writer for Newsday, Howard Stern listened to tapes of Steve and Garry sent from Chicago by a friend of the chief engineer at WCCC Hartford. Colford claims Stern eventually developed his on-air style as a result of these tapes. Later, Stern was hired at WWWW Detroit (which Dahl had left when he moved to Chicago).

==== End of collaboration ====
Steve & Garry moved to WLS, but ultimately returned to WLUP where they stayed until their split in 1993. The alleged reason for the break-up was Dahl's on-the-air comments about Meier's new wife, commercial real-estate broker Cynthia Fircak, while the new couple were on their honeymoon. Meier also blamed Dahl's alcoholism and unpredictable behavior. Dahl, for his part, blamed Fircak for the split, once saying on air "When I met her, I knew the rules had just changed."

In 2003, Robert Feder, a columnist for the Chicago Sun-Times, said, "It's the divorce that just keeps on giving: A decade after Steve Dahl and Garry Meier severed their legendary radio partnership, their breakup remains a source of bitterness and anger for them — and continuing fascination for their fans."

After the team broke up, Dahl went to Sports Talk WMVP AM and teamed with Chicago sportscaster Bruce Wolf.

=== WCKG years ===
Dahl ended up on WCKG, broadcasting an afternoon show on that station. He eventually teamed up with Buzz Kilman, who was Dahl's newsman starting in 1980 on WLUP, and the show was available as a podcast at Dahl's website and streamed live on WCKG's website. Dahl's afternoon show was rated fifth (4.1) among men 25–54 in the winter 2006-2007 ratings report. In 2007, Dahl was named one of the '100 Most Important Radio Talk Show Hosts' by Talkers Magazine.

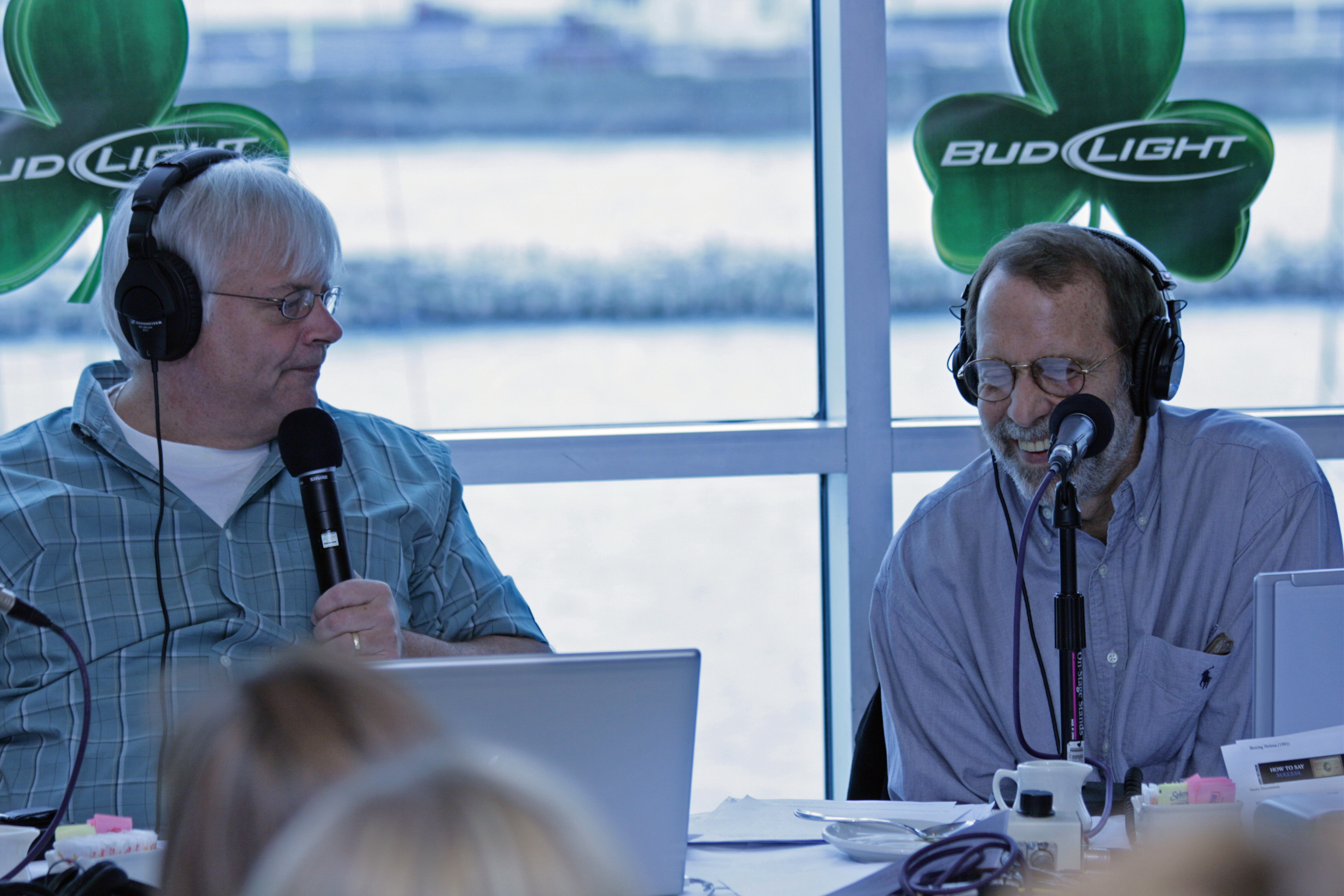
Dahl and Buzz Kilman during a live remote broadcast of The Steve Dahl Show at Navy Pier in March 2008

On Friday, August 18, 2006, Dahl was doing a remote broadcast of his show at Oak Street Beachstro, a restaurant on Chicago's Oak Street Beach. Coincidentally, Garry Meier was eating lunch there with friends. After Dahl learned of Meier's presence there, he invited Meier to appear on the air with him, which Meier accepted. Meier wound up staying for the remainder of the show. This event was covered widely throughout the Chicago media that evening.

On April 2, 2007, Meier returned to Chicago radio, doing the 8 am – 11 am show on WCKG. He appeared briefly on Dahl's show that same day. They occasionally contributed to each other's shows, and Meier spent the first hour and a half in studio during Dahl's show on the 28th anniversary of Disco Demolition Night, recounting the events of that night.

=== Jack FM ===
Dahl announced on October 29, 2007, that he would move to mornings at WJMK on November 5, 2007, as WCKG changed formats. He was the only live personality at the Jack FM outlet as the rest of the station was pre-programmed and run by computer. Dahl's son Matt was part of the regular WCKG lineup and hosted the show immediately following his father's. However, the WCKG format change, from an FM talk station to an adult contemporary station meant the end of Matt's show on WCKG.

Criminal suspect Drew Peterson and his lawyer, Joel Brodsky, called in to Dahl's show on January 23, 2008. Dahl had been lampooning Peterson since the start of the former police officer's notoriety. Brodsky suggested that Dahl host an on-air "dating game" with Peterson the following day, but WJMK managers and Dahl later decided not to go through with it."

On December 5, 2008, Dahl announced the end of his show on Jack FM due to low ratings.

"They were saying, 'Well, do a couple of weeks, a farewell.'" Dahl said. "I said, 'It's not a farewell. You guys are taking me off the air. I'm not retiring.' ... "I still have two and a half years left on my deal so, quite frankly, I'm not letting them out of it." Dahl also said he was prepared to stay off the air for the remainder of his contract, which was to end in mid-2011 and was said to be worth more than $1 million annually.

After the end of Dahl's final broadcast, Howard Cogan, the normally sarcastic signature voice, Jack, heard on many Jack FM stations, delivered a sincere sendoff to Dahl followed by "Life's Been Good" by Joe Walsh, a long-time friend of Dahl's.

=== Back to WLS ===
On October 7, 2014, media blogger Robert Feder reported that Dahl would be returning to terrestrial radio on WLS AM 890. Feder wrote: "Dahl, 59, will join the Cumulus Media news/talk station as afternoon personality, from 2 to 6 p.m. Monday though Friday. If all goes as planned, Dahl would start in early November. Sources familiar with the deal said Dahl will continue his subscription podcast venture, with Cumulus Media becoming a partner in the Steve Dahl Network. Under the agreement, Cumulus would provide financial, technical and marketing support, while Dahl would continue to host a separate, 90-minute daily podcast for his paid subscribers." Dahl confirmed Feder's report on October 8 saying "he's eager to get back on the air to become 'part of the daily conversation in Chicago'".

Dahl's first day back on WLS was November 3, 2014. His show included an appearance by Ron Magers and a phone interview with Bob Odenkirk. Prior to the show, Dahl said in an email, "My plan for the show is to be funny and get good ratings." Dahl also said that he sees his return as not only a good opportunity to try and re-energize radio, but also as a way to turn people onto his podcast.

In October 2018, Dahl confirmed to Feder by email that he was leaving WLS after four years in December 2018, in advance of the major weekday lineup shakeup the station announced would take place in early 2019. Dahl also stated that he intended to continue to produce his daily podcasts in partnership with WLS's owner Cumulus Media. His last day on WLS was December 21, 2018.

== Other work ==
=== Podcasts ===
On September 8, 2009, Dahl began doing daily podcasts from a studio in the basement of his home. At the time, Dahl was still under contract with CBS, who had agreed in July 2009 to partner with him to produce a daily, hour long podcast complete with a few commercials. On August 1, 2011, Dahl, no longer under contract with CBS, began the Steve Dahl Network to continue podcasting. In February 2019, the podcast's affiliation with CBS and Cumulus Media ended, with Dahl stating, "I think it was a good partnership and it benefitted both parties when we were still on the air there", and "Now that we are off the air, it really didn't make a lot of sense for either of us to continue the relationship."

In addition to podcasting, Dahl maintained a presence with his fans through Facebook, Twitter, blogs, occasional newspaper articles (he wrote a regular column for the Chicago Tribune up until 2011), and various television and radio appearances.

=== Music ===
In addition to recording parody songs for his radio show with his early band Teenage Radiation, Dahl began recording and playing live performance with a new band in 1990, called Steve Dahl and the Dahlfins. This band has recorded and released several albums, including 1992's Tropical Tides and 1997's Mai Tai Roa Ae. Dahl frequently collaborated with Chicago-based producer Joe Thomas. In the 1990s, they worked with Beach Boy Brian Wilson in co-writing the song "Your Imagination" which appeared as a single and on Wilson's 1998 album Imagination. Dahl provided backup vocals on the song as well. In 2007, backed by Des Moines, Iowa band The Nadas, Dahl embarked on a tour of Chicago-area concert venues.

=== Acting ===
Dahl had minor roles in the films Grandview, U.S.A., Outing Riley and I Want Someone to Eat Cheese With.

== Honors ==
On November 9, 2013, Dahl and former partner Meier were both inducted into the National Radio Hall of Fame in recognition of their work together on the "Steve and Garry Show".

== Personal life ==
As of August 2025, Dahl resides in the western suburbs of Chicago with his wife Janet, a non-practicing lawyer, whom he married in 1978. Before law school, she taught junior high for seven years in Bloomfield Hills, Michigan. The couple have three sons. Dahl has served on the board of trustees at Columbia College Chicago.

Dahl has battled alcoholism throughout his adult life, which he has alluded to a number of times. He has been sober since 1995, the day after a drinking bout at the White Sox home opener, achieving it cold turkey.

It was sort of prompted by the fact that I realized that Patrick (eldest of his three sons) was 14 and I was rapidly approaching a 'Do as I say, not as I do' situation. I didn't think I had a right to comment on [my sons'] behavior based on my behavior. Plus, once I turned 40 (in November 1994) some metabolic thing happened to me and I guess I just got old.

— Steve Dahl

In 1999, his wife filed a multimillion-dollar lawsuit against Mancow Muller over lewd comments Muller made about her on his show. In 2001, the case was settled. Although the terms of the deal were not disclosed, it was reportedly seven figures. Also in 1999, Steve Dahl admitted secretly recording conversations among staffers at WCKG because he suspected they were talking about him behind his back. In snippets Dahl has played on his afternoon show, two station employees can be heard mocking him as "Steve Dull" and ridiculing his show. Dahl said, "I did it within my organization to confirm my suspicions. This was in a studio filled with microphones and cameras. Legally, I don't feel they had any expectation of privacy in that case."

In February 2025, Dahl announced on social media that he had been diagnosed with prostate cancer. Dahl stated a biopsy had detected the cancer the previous year and a subsequent MRI clarified the results. In an email to the Chicago Sun Times, Dahl stated he had a "curable cancer that 1 in 8 men will be diagnosed with, so this isn't a pity party", and he "expects to begin radiation therapy soon." Dahl added, "I feel good, no better or worse that I normally do.", "I don't expect to miss many podcasts." and "There are side effects to radiation, especially fatigue and some disruption to my digestive systems. We shall see."
