= Garry Meier =

American radio talk show host

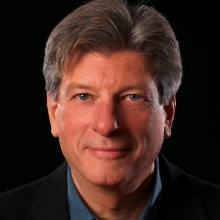
- Born: December 2, 1949 (age 76)
- Presenting career
- Country: United States
- Previous shows: Steve & Garry; The Roe & Garry Show; The Garry Meier Show
- Website: http://garrymeier.com/

Garry Meier (born December 2, 1949) is a Chicago-based radio personality who has been active in Chicago radio since 1973. Meier is well known for being part of the highly successful radio duos "Steve & Garry" and "Roe and Garry", but he also hosted shows on WYEN, WFYR, WLUP, WCKG, WGN and WGN.FM at various times in his career. Meier is also a former feature reporter for WGN-TV's morning show and is a member of the National Radio Hall of Fame. As of March 12, 2016, he has a new show broadcast in Podcast format via his website.

== Early life ==
Garry Meier spent his childhood in the West Pullman neighborhood, on Chicago's South side, then moved to Oak Forest, graduating from Tinley Park High School in 1968. He went to pharmacy school but did not receive a degree. Meier started out as a DJ at WFYR in 1973, then moved to WYEN in 1974. He left WYEN in 1977 and joined WLUP in 1977, broadcasting under the pseudonym "Matthew Meier", as their overnight DJ. Here, he met morning DJ Steve Dahl and the two were teamed up in the morning slot in 1979.

== Steve & Garry ==
The team was soon billed as Steve & Garry During their tenure at WLUP (1979–81), the team was number one in the ratings, and they continued that success at WLS (AM) and WLS-FM from 1981 through 1986 in the afternoon drive slot. In 1986, they went to WLUP (AM) 1000, and then back to WLUP-FM. They later shifted back to mornings on WLUP-FM until Garry left in 1993.

=== Disco Demolition Night ===
One of Steve & Garry's most famous events was Disco Demolition Night. Dahl, along with Meier, and both Mike Veeck (son of then Chicago White Sox owner Bill Veeck), and Jeff Schwartz of WLUP promotions, came up with a radio promotion and tie-in to the White Sox called Disco Demolition Night which took place on Thursday, July 12, 1979. The concept was to create an event to "end disco once and for all" in the center field of Comiskey Park that night by allowing people to get tickets at the box office if they brought 98 cents and at least one disco record. The records were collected, piled up on the field and blown up. Ultimately, this resulted in the second game of the doubleheader being postponed due to hundreds of rowdy fans storming the field and refusing to leave. American League President Lee MacPhail later declared the second game of the doubleheader a forfeit victory for the visiting Detroit Tigers. Six people reported minor injuries, and thirty-nine were arrested for disorderly conduct.

== After Steve & Garry ==
After leaving the Steve & Garry show, Meier hosted his own show on WLUP for one year. In 1994, Meier left WLUP to join WGN-TV in Chicago as a feature reporter on their morning show. He left the show in 1995 to join WLS (AM) with Roe Conn. The Roe & Garry Show enjoyed high ratings during their successful 8-year run. In 2004 Meier did not renew his contract.

== Reunion ==
On Friday, August 18, 2006, during a remote broadcast by Dahl, Meier stopped by for an on-air visit on WCKG. Meier was eating lunch at the Oak Street Beachstro, the site of the remote broadcast, when Dahl learned of Meier's presence there. Dahl invited Meier to appear on the air with him, and Meier accepted. Meier wound up staying for the remainder of the show. The reunion was covered widely throughout the Chicago media that evening and throughout the next week, landing front-page news on both the Chicago Sun-Times and the Chicago Tribune.

== WCKG ==
On April 2, 2007, Meier joined WCKG to host a late morning show from 8:00 AM to 11:00 AM. The announcement, on March 27, 2007, was made during The Steve Dahl Show. The show lasted nearly 7 months until his final broadcast on October 29, 2007, when WCKG eliminated its talk format.

On November 5, 2007, WCKG revamped its all-talk format to an adult contemporary music format.

== WGN ==
On March 2, 2009, Meier began a week-long stint on WGN (AM) during the vacant 1-4 p.m. slot. WGN announced that Meier would take over the 1-4 slot on a permanent basis beginning April 3, 2009.

On April 8, 2010, WGN Radio announced that Garry Meier would become WGN's afternoon drive host effective April 9, 2010. Meier's shift ran 3-7 p.m. on WGN.

On May 21, 2014, Meier was reassigned to WGN's freeform Internet radio station, WGN.FM, effective May 27. On November 20, 2014, Tribune Media announced that it was immediately dropping Meier's afternoon show from their internet stream WGN.fm as well as other changes, moves that were made, according to insiders, because the company had been unable to generate enough revenue to offset its costs.

== Podcast ==
In December 2015, Meier announced plans for an online radio show and podcast to begin sometime in early 2016. Meier also announced that Leslie Keiling, the traffic reporter for his previous WGN show, would be his news anchor. Meier stated that he had to wait until his prior contract with WGN was completed before beginning this new venture. In March 2016, Meier launched a premium subscription podcast service for a monthly fee, but stated that he would initially produce three free one-hour shows per week to try to attract subscribers.

== Honors ==
On November 9, 2013, Meier and former partner Dahl were inducted into the National Radio Hall of Fame in recognition of their work together on the "Steve & Garry Show".
