= Robert Feder =

American blogger (born 1956)

Robert Feder (born May 17, 1956) is an American media blogger who was the television and radio columnist for the Chicago Sun-Times from 1980 until 2008, a blogger for Vocalo.org from 2009 until 2010, and a blogger for Time Out Chicago from 2011 until 2013. Feder also reported local TV and radio news on his own blog.

== Early life and education ==
Born on Chicago's South Side and raised in Skokie, Illinois, Feder earned a bachelor's degree in journalism from Northwestern University's Medill School of Journalism in 1978.

Growing up, Feder considered his idol to be CBS legend Walter Cronkite, and he created the first and only fan club of Cronkite at age 14.

== Professional career ==
Feder got his start in journalism at Lerner Newspapers' Skokie Life newspaper. He then joined the Chicago Sun-Times in 1980, starting out as a legman for TV/radio columnist Gary Deeb. Feder eventually became the paper's TV and radio columnist after Deeb left to join a Chicago TV station, and Feder remained at the Sun-Times as its TV/radio columnist until the fall of 2008.

In 2008, Feder took a buyout from the Sun-Times. After a one-year hiatus, he joined Chicago's Vocalo.org as a blogger, where he worked until December 2010.

Feder joined Time Out Chicago as media critic on January 3, 2011.

On April 8, 2013, Feder announced in an email and on his Facebook page that with the closure of Time Out as a printed magazine and its shift to a digital-only platform, he would accept a buyout of his contract and leave Time Out Chicago.

On August 15, 2013, Feder launched "RobertFeder.com", under a licensing and marketing agreement with Chicago Tribune Media Group. That agreement included some of his blog posts appearing as articles in the Chicago Tribune newspaper. While he continued to blog at his website, his licensing and marketing agreement ended at the end of August 2016 and was not renewed. On April 26, 2017, his blog was under an agreement with the Daily Herald, a newspaper serving the northern, northwestern and western suburbs of Chicago. Feder ceased frequent reporting on his blog in 2022, but still posts items of interest on social media and publishes freelance work.
