= Bird of the Iron Feather =

1970 television soap opera set in Chicago

- Genre: Soap opera; Police drama; Soul drama
- Created by: Richard Durham
- Story by: Richard Durham
- Directed by: Roy Inman; Harold C. Johnson; Peter Strand; Louis Abraham
- Starring: Bernard Ward; Yolande Bryant; Ira William Rogers; Milton Lamb; Melva Williams
- Theme music composer: Muhal Richard Abrams
- Country of origin: United States
- Original language: English
- No. of seasons: 1
- No. of episodes: 21

Production
- Executive producer: Clarence McIntosh
- Production locations: Chicago, Illinois, United States
- Camera setup: Multi-camera
- Running time: 30 minutes
- Production company: WTTW
- Budget: $600,000

Original release
- Network: National Educational Television
- Release: January 19 – March 6, 1970

Bird of the Iron Feather is an American television soap opera that aired on the National Educational Television network from January 19 to March 6, 1970. Created by script writer and radio producer Richard Durham, the series was notable as the first all-Black television soap opera. Bird of the Iron Feather starred African American actor Bernard Ward as fictional Chicago Police Detective Jonah Rhodes. The series addressed social issues like racism, school desegregation and the complicated relationship between Black people and the police. Produced in Chicago, Illinois, the series won a Chicago/Midwest Emmy Award, and was the highest-rated local show ever broadcast by WTTW-TV in Chicago.

== Storyline ==
Bird of the Iron Feather centers on fictional Black Chicago Police Detective Jonah Rhodes (Bernard Ward), who is killed during the 1966 Chicago West Side riots. Stories are told via flashbacks based on his diary, discovered in his police station locker after his death by his nemesis, Sergeant Harry Vines (Milton Lamb). Thirty-five-year-old Jonah is married to Jean (Yolande Bryant), and is responsible for his three younger siblings and grandmother. He studies law at night, and as a cop is "caught in a web between being suspected as a white man's informer of the growing Black rebellion, and an ally to the militants."

The series addressed topics of interest to the African American community from their perspective, including racism, poverty, school desegregation, police corruption and brutality, and the complicated relationship between Black people and police. Bird of the Iron Feather questioned the treatment of disabled people on welfare with a storyline about Jonah's deaf relatives, and addressed Vietnam War veterans in the episode "The Sermon". Another storyline, in the episode "The Target", was inspired by the real-life 1969 Chicago Black Panthers police raid during which Black Panther Party members Fred Hampton and Mark Clark were killed by police. Over the course of the series, Jonah is shown to be "increasingly sympathetic to Black militants, in conflict with his original plans for promotion, more money, a move to the suburbs."

Set in Chicago's South Side, the show's primary settings include Rhodes' Chicago police station, the Rhodes family kitchen and the fictional Funky Frank's Bar.

== Production and broadcast ==
Irna Phillips, the creator of radio and daytime television soap operas from the 1930s to the 1960s, suggested in a mid-1960s on-air interview with Chicago's Channel 11 WTTW-TV program director Edward L. Morris that the soap opera format might work on educational television. Hoping to recreate the success of Cancion de la Raza, a 70-episode drama about a Mexican American family which had aired from October 1968 through January 1969 on KCET in Los Angeles, WTTW conceived a series it called More from My Life which would explore "some of the socioeconomic problems affecting Black Chicagoans." In October 1968, WTTW applied for a $750,000 grant from the Ford Foundation, which owned the National Educational Television network and had a program that funded non-commercial educational stations. In spring 1969, the Ford Foundation awarded WTTW $600,000 to produce 100 episodes of their new series.

On July 7, 1969, WTTW hired writer and radio producer Richard Durham to create the show. An editor at Muhammad Speaks, a Nation of Islam newspaper in Chicago, Durham had previously created the Black radio soap opera Here Comes Tomorrow and the weekly radio drama Destination Freedom. He was inspired by stories he heard from Black Chicago police detective Jack Cole and younger Black officers Edward "Buzz" Palmer and Renault Robinson of corruption, racism and retaliation within the police department. Durham hired Cole, Palmer and Robinson as script consultants. The series was described as a "soul drama" by the press.

Executive producer Clarence McIntosh auditioned nearly 500 actors for the all-Black cast. The potential series drew local attention, and thanks to pressure from several Black community and religious groups united as the Coalition for United Community Action, the production ultimately included a number of Black writers, directors and technicians. Two Black directors, Roy Inman and Harold C. Johnson, were hired to alternate with WTTW's white staff directors, Peter Strand and Louis Abraham. Durham contracted pianist Muhal Richard Abrams, leader of Chicago's Association for the Advancement of Creative Musicians, to serve as composer for the series and create the show's theme, with lyrics by Durham and his son Mark Durham. Oscar Brown Jr. sang the theme. Durham changed the show's title to Bird of the Iron Feather, which came from an 1847 speech by abolitionist Frederick Douglass in which he said that Blacks in America were "birds of iron feathers unable to fly to freedom."

WTTW originally planned to produce five half-hour episodes per week for six months, for a total of 100 episodes. Durham and McIntosh soon realized that they could not produce a high quality show for $6,000 per episode, and pressed for a reduced number of episodes. By November 1969, delays and escalating costs prompted the Ford Foundation to reduce the order to 35 episodes, to air Mondays, Wednesdays and Fridays in the 7:30 pm time slot. Bird of the Iron Feather debuted on January 19, 1970. A Federal Communications Commission complaint about the use of a racial slur and other language prohibited by the FCC in the episode "Speaking of Dreams" prompted the show to be moved to a 9:30 pm time slot with an "adult viewing" disclaimer. Ultimately, Bird of the Iron Feather ran for 21 episodes before production ran out of funds. The final episode aired on Friday, March 6, 1970.

In September 1970, months after the show's cancellation, the Coalition for United Community Action accused Channel 11 of blocking the national airplay of Bird of the Iron Feather. WTTW subsequently received $17,000 from the Ford Foundation to support airing episodes on PBS, NET's replacement, and 13 episodes aired on member stations in September 1971.

Only two complete episodes of the series ("His-Story and Mine" and "The Last Payment") and some fragments are known to have survived, thanks to the efforts of private collector J. Fred MacDonald. MacDonald sold his archive to the US Library of Congress for $2 million in 2010.

== Cast ==
- Bernard Ward as Chicago Police Detective Jonah Rhodes
- Yolande Bryant as Jean Rhodes, Jonah's wife
- Ira William Rogers as Funky Frank, Jonah's uncle and owner of the local bar
- Milton Lamb as Police Sergeant Harry Vines, a competitor for Jonah's position who tends to make trouble for Jonah to further his own career
- Melva Williams as Ethel
- Suki Jones as Maybelle Rhodes, Jonah's younger sister
- Nol Tinner as Maceo Rhodes Jr., Jonah's younger brother
- Katie Brown as Miss Brown, Jonah's deaf-mute aunt. The actress, deaf-mute herself, held a master's degree in psychology and taught sign language at a Jewish vocational guidance school.
- Robert Brown as Jonah's deaf-mute uncle. The actor was the real-life husband of Katie Brown, and also deaf-mute.
- Curly Ellison as Maceo Rhodes Sr., Jonah's father
- Louise Pruitt Dumetz Hodges as Sara, Jonah's grandmother
- David McKnight as Danny Bracy
- Ronald Dean as Abe Murdock
- Charles Walker as Lester Tucker

== Known episodes ==
No.	Title	Directed by	Written by	Original release date	Viewers (millions)	Status
1	"Prescription for a Pallbearer"	Unknown	Unknown	January 19, 1970	N/A	Lost (script exists)
Chicago Police Detective Jonah Rhodes has been killed in the 1966 Chicago West Side riots. Sergeant Harry Vines, another officer who had often conflicted with Rhodes, is cleaning out the deceased cop's locker and finds his diary. Though some misunderstandings have taken place, Rhodes is revealed to be an honest man. Vines turns the diary in to the police superintendent as police officers, friends and family plan Rhodes' funeral.
6	"Speaking of Dreams"	TBA	TBA	TBA	TBD	Lost (script exists)
Rhodes and Vines come into conflict, with Vines continually calling his fellow Black officer a racial slur instead of by his proper name. Vines' use of the "n-word" and other language prohibited by the Federal Communications Commission prompted a complaint to the FCC. The Commission made the rare decision to not enforce its policy due to the nature of the show, but the series was then moved to a 9:30 pm time slot with an "adult viewing" disclaimer.
8	"Theme for Unfinished Faces"	TBA	TBA	TBA	TBD	Lost (script exists)
9	"The Hard Way to Play the Blues"	TBA	TBA	TBA	TBD	Lost (script exists)
TBA	"The Target"	TBA	TBA	TBA	TBD	Lost
Rhodes and some of his colleagues are recruited for a raid on the headquarters of a group called the Black Protectors. Rhodes is dropped from the mission at the last minute, which he believes is because of his ideology about how the police force is evolving. The Black Protectors leader Julian and another member are killed in the raid, and the police officers claim there was a shootout between them and the Protectors. The episode is based on the real-life raid of the Chicago Black Panthers on December 4, 1969. Blank Panthers Fred Hampton and Mark Clark were killed in the raid, and despite police claims of a shootout, a federal grand jury concluded that only one of the more than eighty bullets fired could possibly have come from a Black Panther member's gun. Durham's original script reflected this viewpoint, but WTTW thought this would make the episode too incendiary airing so soon after the real-life incident.
TBA	"The Sermon"	TBA	TBA	TBA	TBD	Lost (script exists)
A disabled Vietnam War veteran named Ragland fills in for the preacher at the local church, and tells his life story.
TBA	"His-Story and Mine"	Roy Inman & Harold C. Johnson	Philip Hayes Dean & Bill Quinn & Bruce Reynolds	TBA	TBD	Exists
The Black students are upset that their school has not hired a Black guidance counselor as was promised. They stage a sit-in in Miss Marsh's history classroom, which antagonizes a group of white students. Though some white students object to the racial slurs being used by the others, the Black and white groups nearly come to blows before Marsh intervenes. She deescalates the situation by sending the white students to the assembly hall. Marsh explains that the principal Mr. Waite has been waiting for the school board to make a decision, but the school board wants to hear more opinions from the public, unions, teachers and school administrative staff. The Black students are concerned that the lack of a counselor focused on their needs has jeopardized their being accepted into good colleges, but Marsh asks them to give the school board more time. Waite is very disappointed, as he believes the integration of the school has been going flawlessly until now. It turns out that Waite has the authority to grant the request, and only passed it to the school board as a courtesy. A conversation with Jonah's younger sister Maybelle helps Marsh begin to better understand the Black students' plight. Chosen as the group's representative, Maybelle meets with Waite, whose solution is to lock the protesting Black students in the school overnight and turn off the heat. Jonah and the police meet with them peacefully, and the next morning Marsh joins the sit-in. Features Aviva Crane as Miss Marsh, Tedd Liss as Mr. Waite and Lionel Mark Smith as Mojo. Lighting by Thomas Markle.
TBA	"The Last Payment"	Roy Inman	David Crowder & Bill Quinn & Bruce Reynolds	TBA	TBD	Exists
Jonah's friend Eugene Davis has purchased a used car from a local car dealer who gives credit. Eugene visits Jonah at the police station and talks about his time in Vietnam. The car keeps breaking down, and though one repair is covered, the others are not. The dealer is unethical and keeps trying to refinance the vehicle to make Eugene pay more. The car is then repossessed to increase the pressure on Eugene, who goes to the dealership and shoots all three salesmen. He puts down the gun and waits quietly for the police to arrive. Features Anthony Cawdor Phillips as Eugene Davis, Colostine Boatwright as Barbara Davis, Stanley Gordon as George Thomas, Tom Elrod as Bob Thomas, Maureen Steindler as Miss Weeks, Evelyn Hoch as Mary, Robert Weiss as Mike Shaw, Al Simmons as Porter and Donald Blackwell as Policeman Joe. Lighting by Thomas Markle.
TBA	"Of Music and My Father (Part 1): One Man's Hands, Another Man's Soul"	TBA	TBA	TBA	TBD	Lost (script exists)
TBA	"Piano Lesson"	TBA	TBA	TBA	TBD	Lost (script exists)
TBA	"Rotten Apples"	TBA	TBA	TBA	TBD	Lost (photographs exist)
Features Harold Lee Rush as Bobby, Carlton Kadell as George Summerville and Charles Smith as Suggy.
19	"One of the Worst Days of My Life"	Unknown	Unknown	March 2, 1970	N/A	Lost (fragment and photographs exist)
An African American teen is caught potentially burglarizing a warehouse by white police officer Pierson. When the suspect runs, Pierson chases him and, despite Jonah's pleas to stand down, shoots him. Features Don Stroup as Officer Pierson and Mike Fulth as the teen. The complete episode is lost except for the aforementioned scene.

A surviving series promotional excerpt on kinescope includes several scenes, including one from the lost episode "One of the Worst Days of My Life" in which a young African American is shot by a white police officer after running away. All excerpts are from lost episodes.

== Reception and awards ==
Bird of the Iron Feather was the highest-rated local show ever broadcast by WTTW-TV in Chicago. Life noted in April 1970 that ratings for the series were "high enough to have assured the series syndication by at least 40 educational stations around the country this year." Lee Bey of WBEZ described Bird of the Iron Feather as "an unflinching look at the harsh realities of ghetto life." Calling the show "television's first attempt to portray life in the Black ghetto as it is actually lived", Life also described it as "an authentic, controversial portrayal of Black ghetto life" and praised its "gutsy reality that is missing from white-washed Black-life shows like Julia". Sergio Mims noted, "the acting is stiff and the production values are meager [but] ... it's the content that counts."

On May 25, 1970, executive producer Clarence McIntosh was awarded a Chicago/Midwest Emmy Award for Outstanding Achievement by a Local Series for Bird of the Iron Feather. The award was presented by Chicago talk show host Lee Phillip, who with her husband William J. Bell would later co-create the daytime soap operas The Young and the Restless and The Bold and the Beautiful.
