= Roi Ottley =

American journalist and writer (1906–1960)

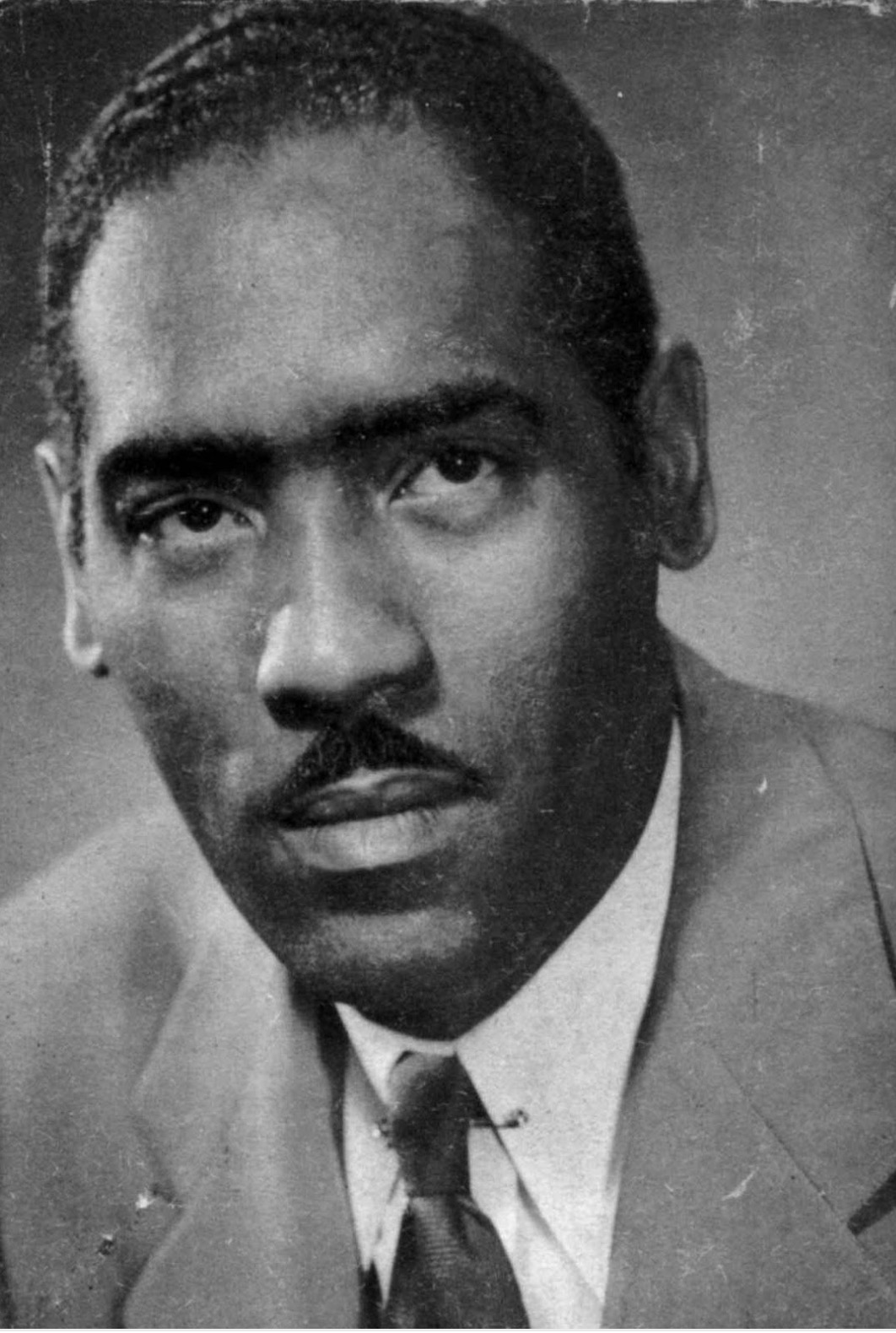
- Born: Vincent Lushington Ottley; August 2, 1906; New York City, New York, United States
- Died: October 2, 1960 (aged 54)
- Education: St. Bonaventure College; University of Michigan; St. John's Law School; Columbia University
- Occupations: Writer, journalist, broadcaster
- Writing career
- Language: English
- Notable work: New World A-Coming: Inside Black America (1943)
- Notable awards: Anisfield-Wolf Book Award; Peabody Award

Vincent Lushington "Roi" Ottley (August 2, 1906 – October 2, 1960) was an American journalist and writer. Although largely forgotten today, he was among the most famous African-American correspondents in the United States during the mid-20th century.

== Early life ==
Roi Ottley was born in New York City on August 2, 1906, to Jerome Peter and Beatrice Ottley, the second of their three children. His parents were immigrants from the Caribbean island country of Grenada. He attended public schools in the city, where he excelled in basketball, baseball, and track, and in 1926 he won a track scholarship to St. Bonaventure College in Allegany, New York. At St. Bonaventure, he was a writer and cartoonist for the campus newspaper. In 1928, he transferred to the University of Michigan to concentrate on journalism. He later studied part-time at St. John's Law School and Columbia University, both in New York City.

== Career ==
Ottley worked as a journalist for the Amsterdam News from 1931 to 1937. In 1937, he joined the New York City Writers' Project as an editor. In 1943, he published New World A-Coming: Inside Black America, which described life for African Americans in Harlem, New York City, in the 1920s and 1930s. The book incorporated Ottley's reports from the New York City Writer's Project. It won the Life in America prize, an Anisfield-Wolf Book Award and a Peabody Award, and was adapted for a series of radio broadcasts. Also the book became the basis for the anthology radio program broadcast on WMAC in New York.

Ottley became the publicity director of national CIO War Relief Committee in 1943. He was commissioned as a lieutenant in the US Army in 1944. During World War II, Ottley reported from Europe for Liberty Magazine, PM, and the Pittsburgh Courier, becoming the first African American war correspondent to cover the war for major newspapers. Ottley covered events such as the Normandy Invasion, the hanging of Mussolini, and the Arab–French conflict in Syria. He also interviewed important personalities like Governor Talmadge of Georgia, and Samuel Green, Grand Dragon of the Ku Klux Klan. Ottley also became the first African American to interview a pope when he met with Pope Pius XII in 1945.

Ottley later worked for the Chicago Tribune and broadcast reports for CBS and BBC radio.

Ottley's other published works include Black Odyssey: The Story of the Negro in America, 1948; No Green Pastures, 1951; and Lonely Warrior: The Life and Times of Robert S. Abbot, 1955. Two were published posthumously: White Marble Lady in 1965, and The Negro in New York: An Informal Social History, 1626–1940 in 1967.

== Death ==
Ottley died on October 2, 1960, from a heart attack, at the age of 54.

== See also ==
- Destination Freedom – a post-WWII anthology radio series airing in Chicago featuring vignettes about Negro history written by Richard Durham

== Primary sources ==
- Ottley, Roi, and Mark A. Huddle, Roi Ottley's World War II: The Lost Diary of an African American Journalist (University Press of Kansas, 2011). ISBN 978-0700617692, 978-0700618910, OCLC 681500381
  - Lankford, James R. (Winter 2013). "Book Review: Roi Ottley's World War II: The Lost Diary of an African American Journalist". On Point. 18 (3). Army Historical Foundation: 60. ISSN 2577-1337. JSTOR 26363235. OCLC 7852920490.
  - Book Discussion on Roi Ottley's World War II with Mark Huddle, June 23, 2012, C-SPAN
