= J. Fred MacDonald =

American academic (1941–2015)

John Frederick MacDonald (14 March 1941 – 9 April 2015) was a professor of history at Northeastern Illinois University, and an archivist of historical films.

== Biography ==
MacDonald was born in New Waterford, Nova Scotia, Canada, a coal-mining town on Cape Breton Island. His parents, Murray Dodd MacDonald and Caroline Pinkerton MacDonald, migrated to the United States in 1944: first to Boston, then, in 1946, to Hawthorne, California, a suburb of Los Angeles. He was educated in local public schools, graduating from Leuzinger High School (in neighboring Lawndale, California) in 1959.

He received a BA in history in 1963 and a MA in 1964, both from the University of California at Berkeley. He joined the Peace Corps in 1964 and was trained at Columbia Teachers College for educational service in Nigeria. Returning to California, he entered the University of California at Los Angeles as a graduate student in European history.

In 1967 he was granted a Fulbright Fellowship, and was the first American scholar to have access to the personal papers of Théophile Delcassé, the French Minister of Foreign Affairs 1898–1905. This resulted in his doctoral thesis, "Camille Barrère and the Conduct of Delcassian Diplomacy in Italy 1898–1902." He received his Ph.D. from UCLA in 1969.

== Academic work ==
MacDonald was appointed Assistant Professor of History at Northeastern Illinois University in 1969, and remained there until retirement in 1996.

He began as a scholar of European history, but in the early 1970s, shifted interest to the history of U.S. popular culture, a then-new field for scholarly inquiry. He became a pioneer academic authority on the history of U.S. broadcasting, writing:

- Don't Touch That Dial!: Radio programming in American life, 1920–1960. Chicago: Nelson-Hall, 1979.
- Blacks and White TV: Afro-Americans in television since 1948. Nelson-Hall, 1983
- Television and the Red Menace: the video road to Vietnam. Praeger, 1985
- Who Shot the Sheriff?: the rise and fall of the television western. Praeger, 1987
- One Nation under Television: the rise and decline of network TV. Pantheon, 1990

He also edited a volume of radio dramas from the notable African-American Chicago writer, Richard Durham, published as Richard Durham's Destination Freedom.

He was also: the first curator (1985–1990) of the Museum of Broadcast Communications, President of the Popular Culture Association (1980–1982), producer and host of his own documentary radio series, Journeys at WBEZ, the Chicago outlet of National Public Radio, (1980–1981), originator and General Editor of the Media and Society series of scholarly books (1987–1990) published by Praeger Publishers.

=== Archival work ===
He and his wife began in 1972, at their own expense, a private archive of vintage pop music, long-forgotten radio programs, and a wide-range of historical 16mm motion pictures. These included travel shorts, old silent educational films, and home movies, to corporate sales shorts, filmed and kinescoped TV programs, commercials, and long-forgotten entertainment shorts.

By the end of the 20th century, the Library of Congress termed the MacDonald repository "the most important archive in private hands in the United States." As a result of this interest, he founded J. Fred MacDonald & Associates in 1986 as a private commercial enterprise. MacDonald sold his archive to the US Library of Congress for $2 million in 2010. The Library of Congress received the resources in late 2010 and shipped them to its Packard Campus for Audio-Visual Conservation in Culpeper, Virginia.

Blending his interest in historic film and a dedication to education, MacDonald created the American Indian Film Gallery in 2010, a website promoting the study of Native American peoples living from the Arctic to the tip of South America. This on-line resource contains 450 vintage films about Indian life between the 1920s and 1970s. After a national search for an appropriate new home, in 2012 he donated the entire website to the University of Arizona which now owns and operates the AIFG.

== Other work ==
MacDonald wrote 2 novels: The headlong fury: A novel of World War One. (according to WorldCat, only two copies of the book are held in libraries) and I, Liberal: A Political Fantasy (which is not listed in WorldCat). He also composed two enhanced e-books: in 2009 The History Shoppe, and the following year its sequel, The Code of Clio. These were placed on-line as free e-books. Their purpose was to introduce high school and college students to the methodology of historians who draw their understanding of history from the examination of original source materials.
