= Dorothy Maynor =

American singer (1910–1996)

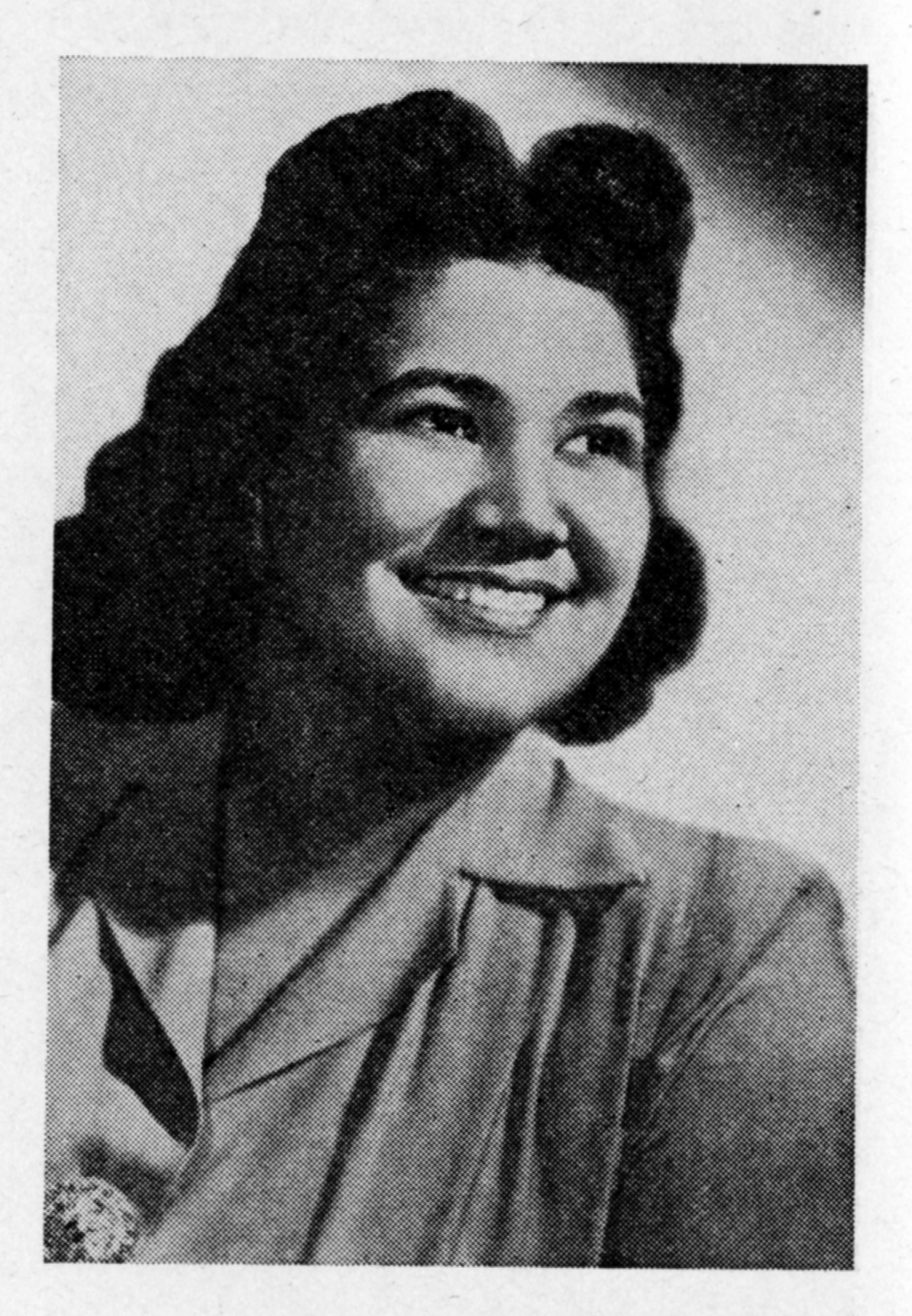

Background information
- Born: Dorothy Leigh Mainor; September 3, 1910; Norfolk, Virginia, U.S.
- Died: February 19, 1996 (aged 85) West Chester, Pennsylvania, U.S.
- Genres: Opera
- Years active: 1933–1979

Dorothy Leigh Mainor (September 3, 1910 – February 19, 1996), known as Dorothy Maynor, was an American soprano, concert singer, and the founder of the Harlem School of the Arts. Considered one of the great singers of her generation, Maynor had a voice that was simultaneously sweet and supple and formidably powerful, with a mezza that was "magically ethereal." Maynor is noted as the first African–American to sing at a presidential inauguration, performing at President Harry S. Truman's inaugural gala in 1949.

== Biography ==
=== Early life and education ===
Born Dorothy Leigh Mainor on September 3, 1910 in the town of Norfolk, Virginia, Maynor's parents were the Reverend John J. Mainor, a local African-American Methodist minister and his wife Alice (Jefferson) Mainor. Maynor attended Hampton Institute, a preparatory school and college created for freed Black slaves, where she studied under R. Nathaniel Dett. After her graduation from the Institute in 1933, Maynor received a four-year scholarship to the Westminster Choir School in Princeton, New Jersey.

=== Career ===
In 1939, Maynor performed at the Berkshire Festival where she was given an audition before Sergei Koussevitzky, conductor of the Boston Symphony Orchestra. She performed Lieder (German art songs), spirituals, and the "Ho-jo-to-ho" aria from Wagner's Die Walküre. Koussevitzky was inspired to proclaim her voice a "miracle" and a "musical revelation" that "the world must hear." She then sang "O, Sleep, Why Dost Thou Leave Me" in front of the music press at Koussevitzky's annual picnic. The New York Times critic Noel Straus called her a "songstress of startling powers." Her debut at The Town Hall in New York City on 9 December 1939 was "the musical event of the 1939 season" and her performance was widely praised by the music press, with Olin Downes writing of "her superb voice, one of the finest that the public can hear today." She received the Town Hall Endowment Series Award for 1940 as a result of this performance. In New York, she was taught by voice instructors William Clamroth and John Alan Haughton.

In one particularly noteworthy concert in 1942 in Long Beach, California, Maynor sang during a wartime blackout until the all-clear was given. Maynor's voice transfixed the audience of 4000 people, easing their fears, and after the blackout was lifted, the audience remained for several encores.

Although Maynor learned 23 operas, racism precluded her from performing in opera houses. Nevertheless, her voice was praised widely by critics, with Paul Hume of the Washington Post calling her voice "glorious" and Olin Downes labeling her a "consummate artist." Maynor toured extensively throughout the US, Europe, and Latin America, performing in concert halls and frequently on the radio. Her signature song was Gustave Charpentier's Depuis Le Jour from Louise, her version of which critic Howard Taubman declared as the "most beautiful since... Mary Garden."

In 1949, Maynor became the first African–American to sing at a presidential inauguration, performing at President Harry S. Truman's inaugural gala in 1949. and at President Dwight D. Eisenhower's 1953 presidential inauguration at DAR Constitution Hall, where the Daughters of the American Revolution famously refused to let Marian Anderson sing in 1939. Though many maintain that Anderson's performance at Eisenhower's 1957 inauguration broke color barriers, Maynor's performances have received comparably less attention, despite predating Anderson by eight years. In 1949, Maynor was featured in an episode of Richard Durham's radio drama Destination Freedom, with Charmaine Anderson playing her character.

In 1964, Maynor founded the Harlem School of the Arts which was designed to give music education at a reduced rate to the mostly Black and Latine children of Harlem. Maynor called it a "cultural oasis in a sea of despair." She conceived the idea of the school when, while at the Savoy dance club in New York, she noticed white musicians scribbling down the intricate rhythms of the Black performers. She resolved at that moment that Black people would learn the disciplines of music to restore the "sound of music" to Harlem's streets and let Black people reap the rewards of their talents. When Maynor started the school, it was a one woman operation, with Maynor serving as administrator, teacher, and janitor. Under Maynor's directorship the school grew from 20 students to 1,000 by the time of her retirement in 1979. She left the school under the directorship of Betty Allen, the American mezzo-soprano.

Maynor received honorary degrees from several universities including Westminster Choir College, Oberlin College, The Hartt School of Music (University of Hartford), and two degrees from Howard University. In 1975, Maynor became the first African-American on the board of directors of the Metropolitan Opera.

== Personal life and death ==
In 1942, Maynor married Reverend Shelby Rooks, the pastor of Harlem's St. James Presbyterian Church where the Harlem School of the Arts was originally located. After her retirement from the school, Maynor moved to Kennett Square, Pennsylvania with her husband. Maynor died on 19 February 1996 in West Chester, Pennsylvania.
