= Here Comes Tomorrow (radio show) =

Radio soap opera featuring African-Americans

Here Comes Tomorrow was a radio soap opera featuring African Americans on WJJD. It was written by Richard Durham and Jack Gibson. Oscar Brown Jr. starred. The show's subject was the African American family.

Jack Gibson recalled working on the show and said staff members had to sneak out the freight elevators and back alleys because the show's "strong" content was controversial. The acclaimed show is considered groundbreaking.

== See also ==
- Destination Freedom, another of Richard Durham's radio shows
- List of radio soap operas
