= Harlem School of the Arts =

Art school in Harlem, New York

Coordinates: 40°49′19.95″N 73°56′45.17″W

The Harlem School of the Arts
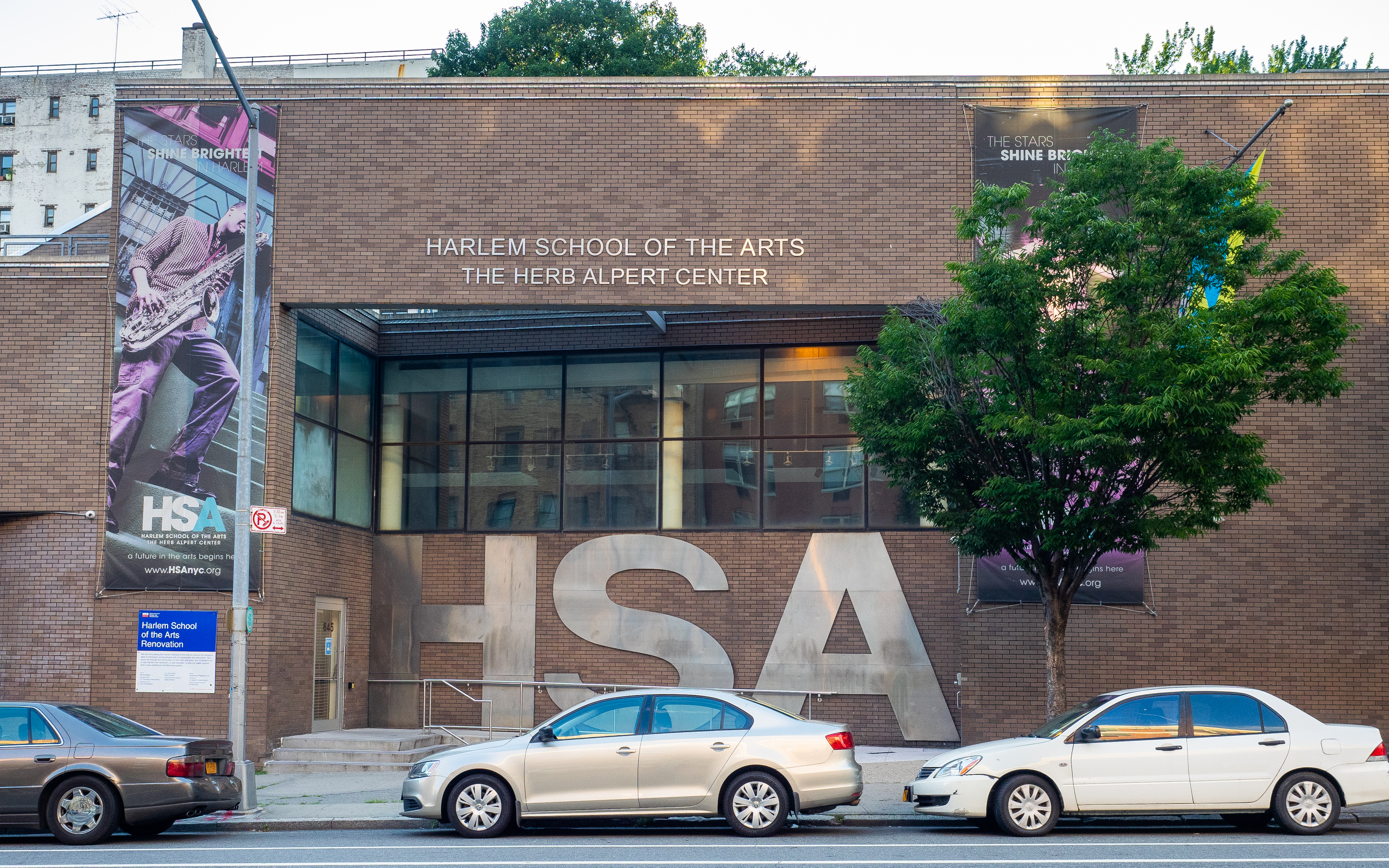

Location
- 645 Saint Nicholas Avenue; Harlem, Manhattan, New York City, New York 10030; United States

Information
- Established: 1964; 62 years ago
- President: James C. Horton
- Website: hsanyc.org

Harlem School of the Arts (HSA) is in the Harlem neighborhood of Manhattan, New York City, United States. Founded in 1964, HSA serves ages 2 through 18.

== History ==
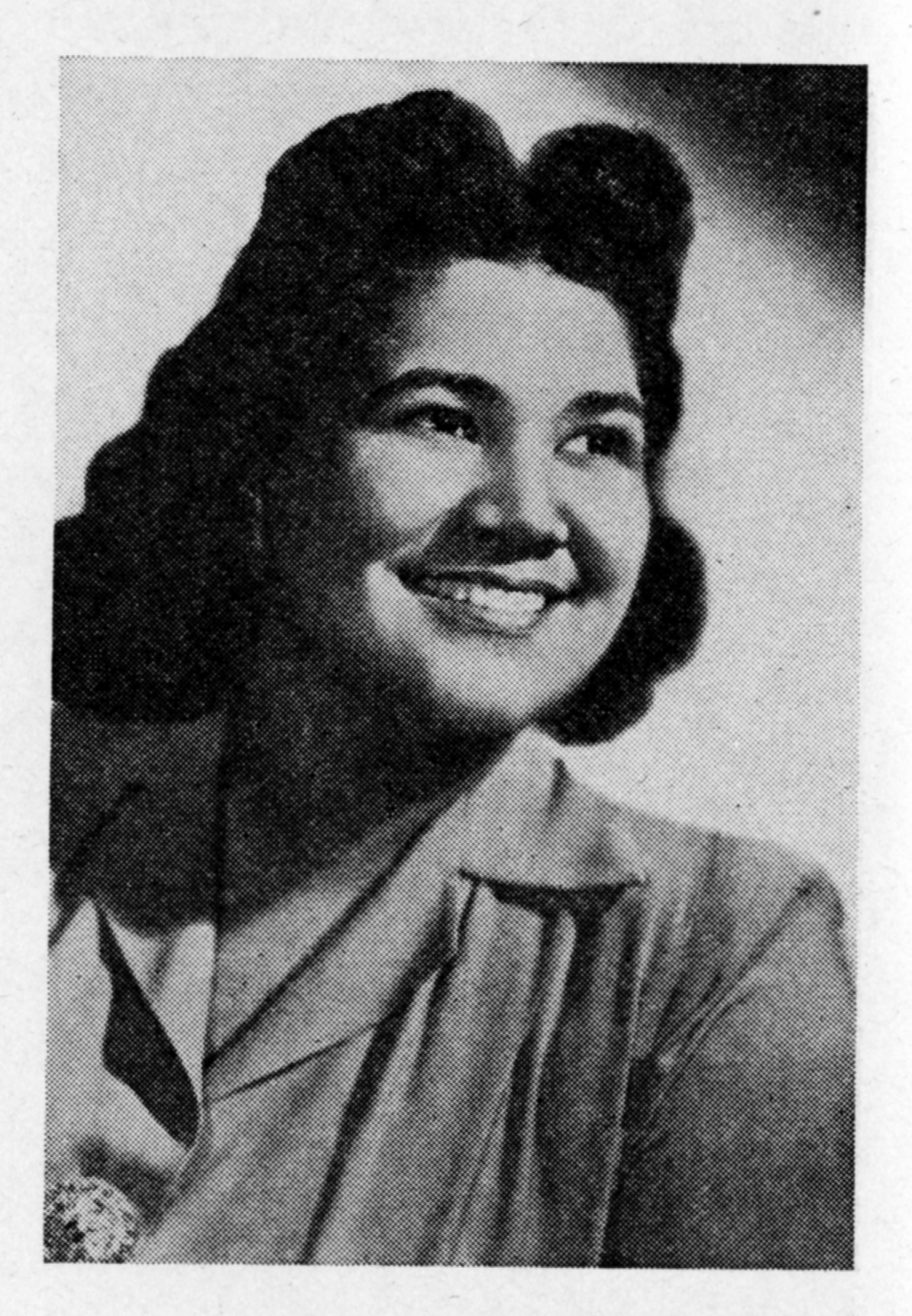
Founder of HSA, Dorothy Maynor.

Harlem School of the Arts was founded in 1964, by soprano Dorothy Maynor in the basement of the St. James Presbyterian Church in Harlem at a time when the community suffered severe physical blight, high levels of poverty, and few cultural resources for its young people. Maynor was succeeded by mezzo-soprano Betty Allen as president in 1979, when a new 37,000-square-foot facility designed by Ulrich Franzen was completed. Other presidents included Allicia Adams, Camille Akjeu, and Daryl Durham. Eric G. Pryor was president and CEO between August 2015 and December 2019. Since September 2022, James C. Horton has served as president and CEO.

In 2005, the school was among 406 New York City arts and social service institutions to receive part of a $20 million grant from the Carnegie Corporation, which was made possible through a donation by then New York City Mayor Michael Bloomberg. Despite the Great Recession of 2010, the Harlem School of the Arts stabilized its fiscal position following a $6 million gift.

=== Courses ===
The school offers courses in four disciplines: music, theatre, visual arts, and dance. Courses in music include classical, jazz, gospel, R & B, electronic, and world music. Dance courses include ballet, modern, ethnic, jazz, and tap dance. In addition to theater classes, the visual art department offers courses that include sculpture and photography (digital and film). The school's students are of diverse cultural backgrounds with more than 85% of the students being African American or Latino. HSA provides financial aid on a first-come, first-served basis through the generous donations of the Herb Alpert Foundation and other generous benefactors. The school also offers private lessons in various disciplines, including multiple instruments along with dance, digital art, animation, cinematography, and acting.

=== Other information ===
The school was featured in the May 1966 issue of EBONY Magazine.

== Notable alumni ==
- De’Adre Aziza– actor.
- Harolyn Blackwell – opera singer.
- Ray Chew – composter and arranger.
- Ya Ya DaCosta –actress
- Kelman Duran –multi-disciplinary artist.
- Giancarlo Esposito – actor
- Katori Hall –playwright
- Caleb McLaughlin – actor
- Karlie Redd – reality television personality and actress.
- Noah Stewart –opera singer.
- Shannon Sky Tavarez –singer.

== Notable faculty ==
- J. D. Parran
- Dorothy Maynor
- Betty Allen
- Arthur Mitchell

== Timeline ==
- 1947: After an international career as an opera singer, on April 21, 1947, Dorothy Maynor incorporates the St. James Community Center, Inc. in the basement of the St. James Presbyterian Church, where her husband was the pastor.
- 1964: Officially renamed The Harlem School of the Arts. Mrs. Samuel Duskin and Mrs. Artur Rodzinski were elected co-chairmen of the board of trustees
- 1966: Arthur Mitchell, the leading dancer with New York City Ballet, joins faculty. School is at full capacity with 300 students enrolled. May 17 – New York State Award presented to the school by Governor Nelson A. Rockefeller for "outstanding dedication and accomplishment in developing the artistic talents of the children of Harlem.” Five children from the school performed at the event, held at Union College in Schenectady. John Philip Sousa III (grandson of the famous “march king”) was elected Chairman of the board of trustees. Mrs. Vladimir Horowitz forms Women's Committee with Leontyne Price serving as Honorary Chairman.
- 1967: The New York Times publishes the article “To Make Beauty in Harlem” on HSA November 5, “What we are counting on is that we can add new dimensions to their lives, the most important of which is beauty.” – Dorothy Maynor
- 1969: HSA inaugurates its new theater faculty with a production of Aime Cesaire's A Season in the Congo. The new theater was converted from an abandoned garage.
- 1972: Maynor serves as visiting lecturer for Yale University's Department of Drama (1971–72)
- 1974: The Harlem School of the Arts Heritage Society One Hundred Voice Choir, with Maynor as conductor, makes its Lincoln Center debut on March 4. The sold-out Gala Benefit Performance at Alice Tully Hall features soloists Betty Lane; Louise Parker, George Shirley, and McHenry Boatwright with a surprise performance by Metropolitan Opera star Martina Arroyo. The Honorable Mayor Abraham D. Beame and Mrs. Beame are honorary chairmen, and Ms. Alice Tully is Chairman of the event.
- 1975: HSA celebrates its 10th anniversary and breaks ground for the new building. The Heritage Society Chorus also performs at the United Nations in celebration of Human Rights Day, and HSA Founder Maynor becomes the first woman to conduct at the U.N.On March 4, New York City Mayor Abraham Beame issues a proclamation to “Dorothy Maynor In recognition of her outstanding career as a world-renowned soprano and her devotion to the people of New York. Her Harlem School of the Arts has given an entire community entrée to the World of Art.”
- 1977: HSA inaugurates its Opportunities for Learning in the Arts program, which provides art instruction to children in NYC public schools, in response to severe cuts in city funding for public school arts programs.
- 1978: The Municipal Art Society presents HSA with its Citation of Merit in recognition of the school's distinctive contribution to the cultural life of New York City. On June 6, The Bard Awards for Excellence in Architecture and urban design cite HSA building architects Ulrich Franzen & Associates for the design of the building, with special mention of “a grand and welcoming central hall, an attractive exterior courtyard and a myriad of lively class and practice rooms.” Maynor is presented with the Louis Armstrong Award from the Knickerbocker Business and Professional Women's Club, Inc. The award is presented by Mrs. Louis Armstrong.
- 1979: HSA's new building is dedicated. Founder Maynor retires, appointing mezzo-soprano Betty Allen as new president and CEO.
- 1982: Harlem School of the Arts Orchestra is formed. 50 children between the ages of six and thirteen perform at the opening of Central Park's Belvedere Castle
- 1988: ARTScape Summer Program is introduced. The Gala opening of the 25th-anniversary season of HSA begins with a benefit concert at the Apollo Theater. Actress Phylicia Rashad and pianist Andre Watts are honorary co-chairs. Maestro Zubin Mehta conducts the New York Philharmonic.
- 1989: HSA enters a new relationship with classical radio station WQXR, and launches annual radiothon, on-air fundraiser.
- 1990: Student enrollment at HSA exceeds 1,500 for the first time.
- 1992: November 4, 1992 – HSA Concert Chorale, “Legaci”, directed by Yvonne Hatchett, performs at the One Hundred Year Association at The Museum of City of New York.August 10, 1992 – HSA presents The Marie Brooks Caribbean Dance Theater in performance, followed by Ruby Dee, who reads from her new children's book, Glow Child at HSA. July 1992 – HSA students perform at a reception hosted by democratic committee Chairman Ron Brown's wife, Mrs. Alma Brown during the Democratic Convention held in NYC. Audience members included Tipper Gore, Hillary Clinton, Virginia Kelly (Bill Clinton's mother), and Joyce Dinkins, wife of former NYC Mayor David Dinkins. Betty Allen becomes President Emeritus of HSA, and Alicia Adams is named CEO.
- 1993: Miranda McDermott, HSA chairperson of the Drama and Creative Writing Department for nearly 3 decades, is awarded a Harlem School of the Arts Humanitarian Award. Fourth annual WQXR Radiothon, co-hosted by radio host Robert Sherman and Ms. Betty Allen, President of HSA, features celebrities such as Bobby Short, Martina Arroyo, and Mario Barnardi, conductor of the Calgary Philharmonic Orchestra, who lend their support to share why arts education is so important. HSA students Oswald Tomlinson and Faith Wallace-Badensen win first and second prizes respectively in a photography competition sponsored by The Black Photographers Circle of The Center for Creative Photographers at Hunter College/CUNY. HSA student Nkenge Simpson takes first place at New York Newsday's Lena Horne Vocal Scholarship Competition.
- 1994: Max Roach and Urban Bush Women are artists-in-residence at HSA.
- 1996: Harlem School of the Arts Founder Maynor dies in West Chester, Pennsylvania, at the age of 85.
- 1999: HSA is named one of the eight leading African American, Asian, Latino or Native American arts organizations in the nation.
- 2000: Camille Giraud Akeju, a former HSA student, becomes president and CEO of HSA.
- 2001: The Classical Theatre of Harlem serves as HSA Artists-in-Residence.
- 2002: October 12, 2002 – 1st Annual HSA Alumni Homecoming. Honorary Chairperson, Inaugural Homecoming Committee, Lisa Gay Hamilton, Faculty Alumna and star of ABC's The Practice; Guest Host, Claudio Lescano. Alumni include Charles Lovel, pianist; Camille Giraud Akeju, HSA President & CEO; T. Ray Lawrence, bass-baritone; Priscilla Baskerville, soprano; Gwendolyn Bynum, pianist accompanist; Patricia Bates Eaton, professional chorister with Metropolitan Opera, NYC. The Classical Theatre of Harlem serves as HSA Artists-in-Residence.
- 2007: HSA dance students work with London-based choreographer Adesola Akinleye and dancer Sean Graham as Akinleye develops a new work inspired by Ralph Ellison's Invisible Man.
- 2008: HSA and the African Film Festival New York present The 2nd Annual Harlem Teen Film Festival. HSA honors Actress Alfre Woodard, Deloitte CEO Barry Salzberg and Opera Legend Betty Allen at Art Is Life Gala. HSA presents Prolepsis, the first group exhibition of works by HSA Teaching Artists, and introduces The G-Space Gallery, the newest contemporary gallery space in Harlem. HSA presents the Harlem Teen Film Festival, celebrating the works of Harlem and Greater New York teen filmmakers (12–18), in collaboration with the Ghetto Film School, the Downtown Community Television Center, Pro-TV and the Global Action Project.
- 2011: Yvette L. Campbell becomes new president and CEO of HSA. Mayor Bloomberg names Saint Nicholas Avenue at 141st Street Dorothy Maynor Place. HSA board and new leadership successfully complete two matching fundraising campaigns each raising over $100 million: 100 days $1 million, and Herb Alpert Challenge.
- 2013: The Harlem School of the Arts building is renamed The Herb Alpert Center in honor of leadership gift from musician and philanthropist Herb Alpert.
- 2014: For the second consecutive year, Harlem School of the Arts remains one of only four affiliate schools in the world to offer the American Ballet Theatre National Ballet Curriculum to its dance students. Jazz club Minton's presented HSA's Advanced Jazz Combo as part of a three-part Sunday Jazz Brunch Series: Rising Stars of Jazz. Jazz at Lincoln Center conducted 3 Jazz for Young people concerts at HSA. Grammy award-winning musician, Arturo O’Farrill returns as HSA Artist-in-Residence.
- 2015: For the third consecutive year, Harlem School of the Arts remains one of only four affiliate schools in the world to offer the American Ballet Theatre (ABT) National Ballet Curriculum to its dance students. HSA ballet faculty, certified in the ABT National curriculum.
- 2019: "The Renaissance Project", an extensive renovation, was announced at a cost of $9.5 million.
- 2020: The school receives a donation from the Herb Alpert Foundation and makes renovations led by Walters-Storyk Design Group.
