= WYLL =

Christian talk radio station in Chicago

- Chicago, Illinois; United States
- Broadcast area: Chicago metropolitan area
- Frequency: 1160 kHz
- Branding: AM 1160 WYLL

Programming
- Language: English
- Format: Christian radio
- Network: Salem Radio Network

Ownership
- Owner: Salem Media Group; (Salem Media of Massachusetts, LLC)
- Sister stations: WIND

History
- First air date: October 13, 1924
- Former call signs: WJJD (1924–1997); WSCR (1997–2000); WXRT (2000–2001)

Technical information
- Licensing authority: FCC
- Facility ID: 28630
- Class: B
- Power: 50,000 watts
- Transmitter coordinates: 42°2′30.1″N 87°51′57.2″W (day antenna); 41°34′23.1″N 87°59′37″W; (night and aux. antenna)

Links
- Public license information: Public file; LMS
- Webcast: Listen live; Listen live (via Audacy); Listen live (via iHeartRadio)
- Website: 1160hope.com

WYLL (1160 kHz) is a commercial radio station in Chicago, Illinois. It originated as WJJD and broadcast some pioneering shows. It is owned by Salem Media Group and airs a Christian radio format. The studios and offices are located in Elk Grove Village. Its daytime transmitter and two-tower array are located off Ballard Road near Interstate 294 in Des Plaines. The nighttime transmitter and six-tower array are off Deer Drive near Interstate 355 in Lockport.

WYLL operates at 50,000 watts around the clock. However, unlike Chicago's other two 50,000-watt AM stations, WSCR and WLS, WYLL is a class B regional station, and has fewer protections from other stations than clear-channel WSCR and WLS. Its daytime signal provides at least secondary coverage to half of Illinois, as well as portions of Wisconsin (including Milwaukee), Indiana and Michigan. At night, it must adjust its coverage to protect clear-channel KSL in Salt Lake City, hence the different tower sites.

== History ==
=== WJJD ===
On October 13, 1924, the station first signed on with the call sign WJJD. The station was owned by the Loyal Order of Moose and was located in Mooseheart, Illinois. It was powered at 500 watts and operated at 278 meters (1080 kHz). In January 1925, its frequency was changed to 990 kHz and in December 1925 it was changed to 810 kHz. By 1926, the station's power had been increased to 1,000 watts.

In 1926, auxiliary studios were established in the Palmer House, from which a variety of musical programming was broadcast. In 1927, the station's frequency was changed to 820 kHz, and the following year its frequency was changed to 1180 kHz and its power was increased to 20,000 watts. In 1929, its frequency was changed to 1130 kHz. For most of its history, WJJD was a daytimer, required to sign off at sunset in Salt Lake City, to protect clear-channel station, KSL.

WJJD aired a variety of music, general entertainment, sports, and public interest programming in the 1920s, 30s, and 40s.

In 1933, the station was sold to a firm headed by Ralph Atlass, and its studios were moved to the Trustees System Service Building in Chicago. In 1936, the station's transmitter was moved to Des Plaines and in 1940 its studios were moved to the Carbide & Carbon Building. Its frequency was changed to 1160 in 1941, as a result of the North American Regional Broadcasting Agreement.

In the fall of 1937, the station was one of several Chicago radio stations to donate airtime to Chicago Public Schools for a pioneering program in which the school district provided elementary school students with distance education amid a polio outbreak-related school closure.

Lew Fonseca and Charlie Grimm broadcast Chicago Cubs baseball games on WJJD during the 1939 and 1940 seasons. WJJD won the exclusive rights to broadcast Cubs games locally in 1944, though 560 WIND won exclusive rights to broadcast the following season. Ed Short was the station's director of sports publicity and promotion from 1946 until 1950, when he became the Chicago White Sox press and promotion director.

In 1944, the station was sold to Field Enterprises for approximately $750,000. In 1947, the station's power was increased to 50,000 watts, although it could only broadcast during the daytime. In 1947, WJJD began airing Here Comes Tomorrow, which was the first radio serial with an all African-American cast. Al Benson was a R&B disc jockey on WJJD in the late 1940s.

In 1953, Plough Broadcasting purchased WJJD for $900,000. Plough Broadcasting was a subsidiary of the large pharmaceutical company Schering-Plough. WJJD featured both pop and country music programs in the 1950s, in an era where country and western music was not common on radio stations in Northern U.S. cities.

In June 1956, WJJD left country music for several years, flipping to a Top 40 format. But with tough competition from 890 WLS in the early 1960s, WJJD shifted to a pop standard format. In 1961, the studios were moved to the transmitter site in Des Plaines.

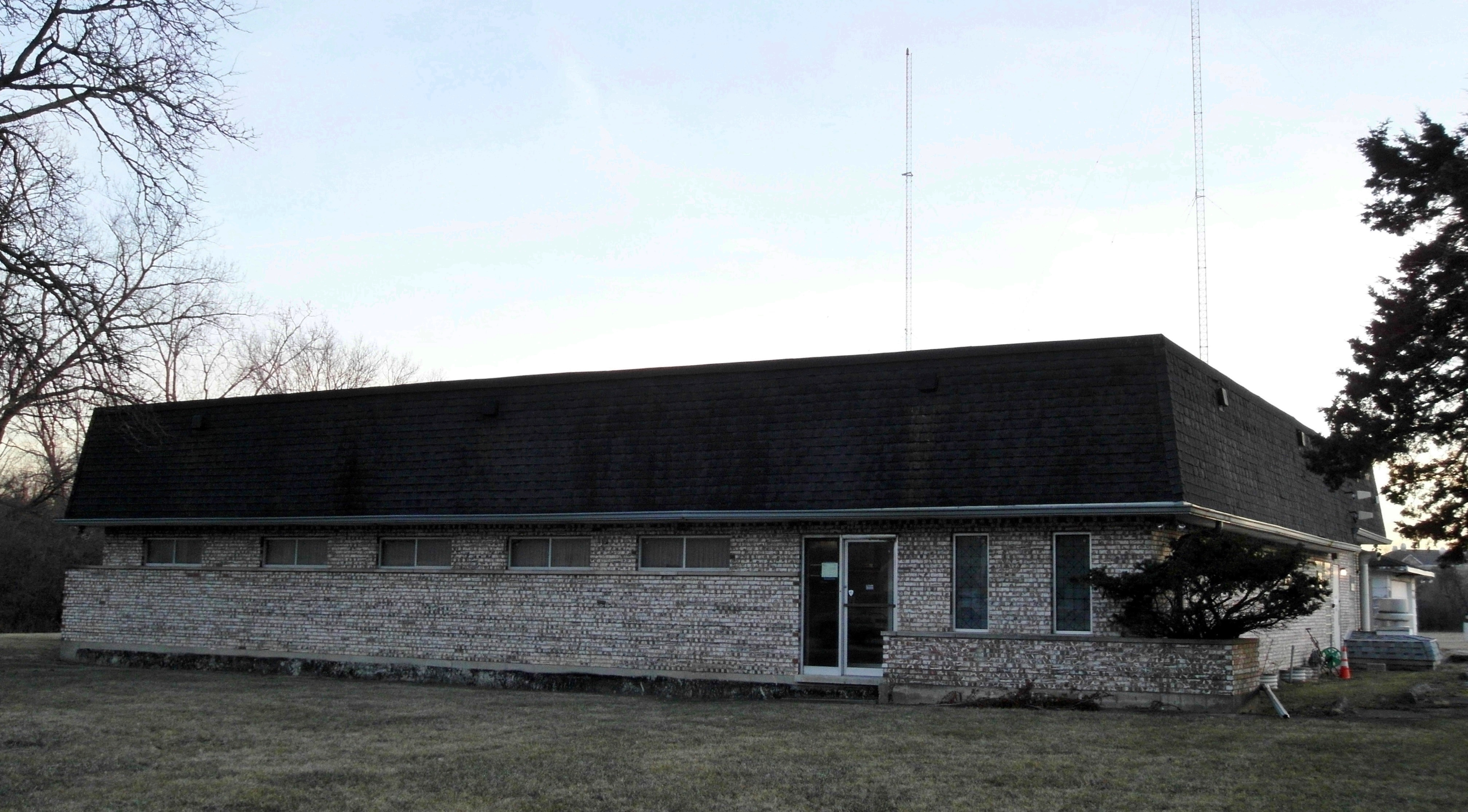
WJJD's studio building in Des Plaines

On February 15, 1965, WJJD adopted a country music format. The station's programming was simulcast on 104.3 WJJD-FM, with the FM station continuing WJJD's country programming after sunset. In 1966, its studios and transmitter were moved one mile west. In 1977, the simulcast ended when 104.3 FM switched to a "beautiful country" format as WJEZ.

In April 1982, the station began 24-hour operations, running 2,500 watts at night, with plans to increase its nighttime power to 10,000 watts in July. However, its nighttime power was reduced to 5,000 watts later that decade.

In February 1982, WJJD adopted an adult standards format, and carried programming from the syndicated "Music of Your Life" network. Its audience share tripled following the format change. The station was branded "Music of the Stars" and featured artists such as Frank Sinatra, the Count Basie Orchestra, Tony Bennett, Patti Page, the McGuire Sisters, Glenn Miller, Tommy Dorsey, Nat King Cole, and Barbra Streisand. Hosts included Eddie Hubbard and Art Hellyer. Hubbard and Hellyer both left WJJD in 1983, with Hubbard joining AM 820 WAIT.

In 1984, WJJD and WJEZ were sold to Infinity Broadcasting for $13.5 million. Clark Weber joined WJJD in 1985, hosting a talk show weekday mornings, while adult standards continued to air in the remainder of the schedule. In April 1993, the station began airing G. Gordon Liddy's syndicated talk show middays.

In November 1994, WJJD dropped adult standards music altogether for a full-time talk format. Hosts included Ed Vrdolyak, Ty Wansley, G. Gordon Liddy, David Brenner, the Don and Mike Show, Tom Leykis and Jim Bohannon. WJJD began airing The Howard Stern Show mornings in October 1995. Ed Vrdolyak and Ty Wansley were moved from mornings, and replaced Don and Mike in the afternoon. On July 29, 1996, WJJD returned to an adult standards format, though it retained G. Gordon Liddy and Tom Leykis's programs.

In 1996, Infinity Broadcasting was purchased by the parent company of CBS. That meant WJJD was now sister stations with WBBM and WBBM-FM. On February 3, 1997, the station began simulcasting the oldies programming of 104.3 WJMK.

=== WSCR ===
In 1997, CBS sold its Chicago sports radio station 820 WSCR. CBS wanted to put its sports programming on a more powerful station, so WSCR's sports shows were moved to AM 1160 on April 7, 1997. The station was branded The Score. Hosts on The Score during this period included Norm Van Lier, Doug Buffone, Terry Boers, Dan Bernstein, Mike North, Dan McNeil, and Dan Jiggetts.

In the spring of 2000, Viacom merged with CBS, and the merged company had to divest a station to satisfy FCC ownership limits. CBS/Infinity decided to sell WSCR and move its format to the frequency of WMAQ, leaving co-owned WBBM 780 as the only all-news formatted station in Chicago. The move would place WSCR's format on a 50,000-watt clear-channel station with a daytime signal covering parts of five states and a nighttime signal coveirng much of the eastern half of North America. On August 1, 2000, WMAQ began simulcasting WSCR's sports programming. Two weeks later, the WSCR call sign officially moved to AM 670, retiring the long-standing WMAQ call letters in the process. On August 15, 2000, 1160's call sign was changed to WXRT, and the station began simulcasting the adult album alternative programming of 93.1 WXRT-FM.

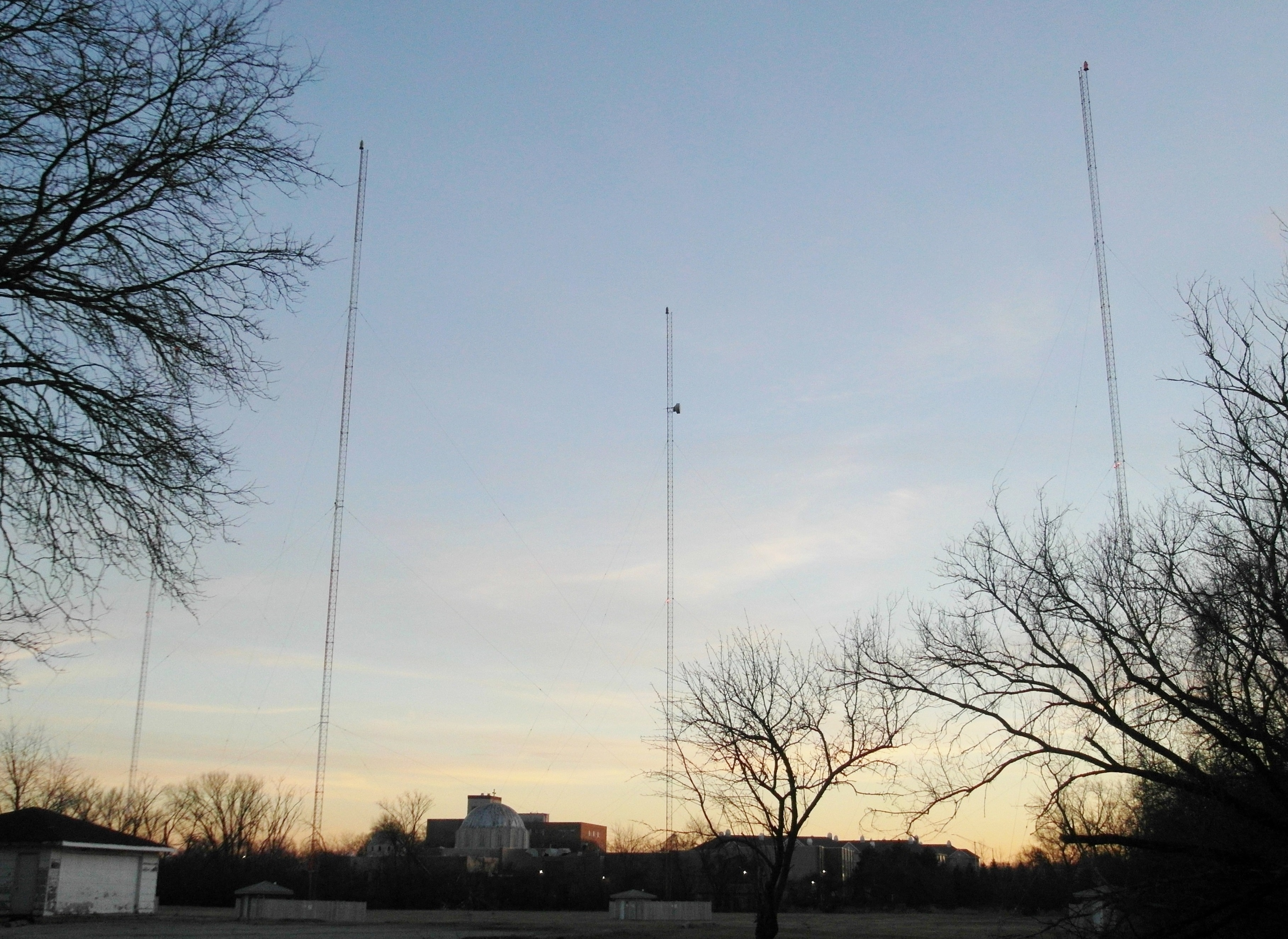
WYLL's daytime transmitter site in Des Plaines

=== WYLL ===
In late 2000, Salem Communications purchased the station for $29 million. In February 2001, Salem moved the Christian talk programming of WYLL 106.7 FM to 1160 AM, along with the WYLL call letters. The station was branded "Chicago's Word". FM 106.7 switched to a Christian contemporary music format the following month.

In addition to the primarily national Christian talk and teaching programming heard on the station, Sandy Rios hosted a local talk show weekday afternoons on WYLL from 1994 to 2001 and again from 2007 to 2010, when she moved to Washington, D.C.

On April 7, 2005, WYLL's nighttime power was increased to 50,000 watts. The higher power required a six-tower directional array, with the towers used for daytime broadcasts about 30 miles away from the towers used for nighttime operation.
