= Wezlynn Tildon =

American journalist

- Wezlynn Tildon, from a 1934 newspaper
- Born: September 19, 1918; Fort Worth, Texas, U.S.
- Died: August 15, 1993 (aged 74); Texas
- Other names: Wezlynn Tilden, Wezlyn Tilden, Weslene Tildon
- Occupation(s): Actress, columnist

Wezlynn Margaret Develle Tildon (September 19, 1918 – August 15, 1993), sometimes billed as Wezlyn Tilden, was an American newspaper columnist and radio actress.

== Early life and education ==
Tildon was born in Fort Worth, Texas, the daughter of J. Wesley Tildon Jr. and Bertine Washington Tildon. Her father was a physician. Her uncle was Toussaint T. Tildon, director of the Veterans Hospital at Tuskegee.

Tildon was raised mostly in Chicago, but was a debutante in Harlem in 1939, and was billed as "Harlem's Glamour Girl" in newspapers. She graduated from Wadleigh High School for Girls in 1936, in the same class as composer Arlein Ford Straw. She graduated from New York University in 1942; at NYU, she was president of the Dramatic Art Club, and the only Black drama student in her year. She was a member of Alpha Kappa Alpha. She also attended the University of California, Los Angeles (UCLA).

== Career ==
Tildon was junior society columnist for The New York Age newspaper, and worked for the Treasury Department as a young woman. In Chicago, she was a stage actress, and a member of the W. E. B. Du Bois Theater Guild and Skyloft Players. She was in the cast of Here Comes Tomorrow (1947–1948), the first all-Black radio soap opera to be broadcast in America. She starred in several episodes of the radio drama anthology series Destination Freedom from 1948 to 1950, playing historical figures such as Harriet Tubman, contralto Marian Anderson, poet Gwendolyn Brooks, and dancer Katherine Dunham. She was also in the regular cast of the first program broadcast over the National Negro Network, The Story of Ruby Valentine (1954), a daily soap opera.

Tildon wrote several songs, radio scripts, and stage plays, including The Cup (1948). She also taught acting classes at the New Era Professional College in Chicago. In 1954, she was "fan mail secretary" at the Today show.

== Personal life ==
Tildon died in 1993, at the age of 74, in Texas.
