= The Greatest: My Own Story =

1975 book by Muhammad Ali

- First edition
- Editor: Toni Morrison
- Author: Muhammad Ali; Richard Durham
- Language: English
- Genre: Autobiography
- Publisher: Random House
- Publication date: 1975
- Pages: 413
- ISBN: 1631680498

The Greatest: My Own Story is a 1975 autobiography of heavyweight boxer Muhammad Ali, who was World Heavyweight Champion and has been called the greatest heavyweight from all eras. The book covers his life up to the time of its publication, including the first and part of the second term of his three terms as World Heavyweight Champion.

It was written in collaboration with Richard Durham and edited by Nobel Prize-winning novelist Toni Morrison. The book covers Ali's life in and out of the ring. The book is a multifaceted portrait of Muhammad Ali's life; unapologetic anti-war advocate; goodwill ambassador; fighter, lover, poet, and provocateur.

External videos
- Interview with Muhammad Ali, 56:25, Ali discusses The Greatest with Studs Terkel, Studs Terkel Radio Archive

== Assessment ==
It is alleged that Ali was not involved, and not interested, in the writing of this book to the extent that he never read it till after it was published. It is also alleged that before any material in this book was submitted to the publisher, each page had to be approved by Herbert Muhammad who exercised effective censorship on the contents of the book. Former Random House editor-in-chief James Silberman, who was involved in editing the book, claimed that "I'm not sure the book is the true story of Ali's life."

In his own biography of Ali, Ferdie Pacheco offered criticism of Richard Durham:

[Durham] hung around, stirring up phony scenarios with racial themes, trying to write pathetic revisionist history, making Ali a cross between Martin Luther King, Dred Scott, and Joan of Arc. The book he finally delivered had to be heavily edited by its publisher and does not present the Muhammad Ali I know.

Toni Morrison, who worked as an editor at Random House at the time, was reportedly "stunned" by the way Herbert Muhammad would constantly demand changes in the manuscript prepared by Durham. According to Morrison, Herbert's behavior during the preparation of this book, which included making numerous threats, caused her anxiety. All rough language, including wikt:"locker room talk", was disallowed from being included in the book by Herbert. Additionally, the changes in the manuscript demanded by Herbert involved the glorification of Herbert in that Herbert was deemed the main person responsible for Ali's rise. Morrison noted that "the gold medal story" in the book was specifically denied by Ali after the book's release. According to Morrison: "So he [Ali], in a sense, discredited the book in a way that was unfair to the stories he had told Richard in the first place or to the stories Richard may have invented to make a point."

Nevertheless, Morrison thought "the book was more accurate than not."
