= Matt Bowen (American football) =

American football player (born 1976)

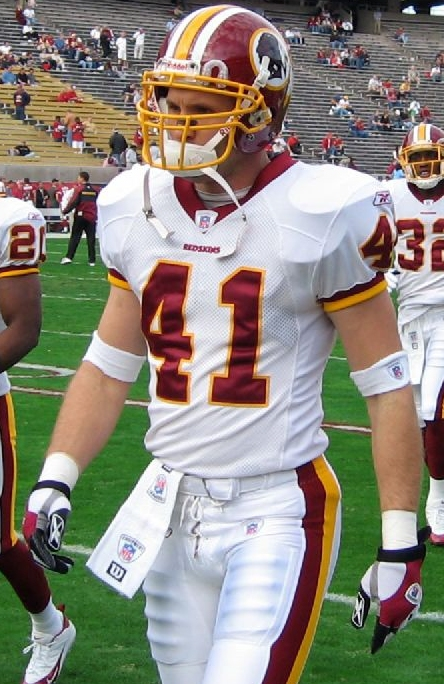
- Bowen with the Washington Redskins in 2005

No. 27, 28, 41
- Position: Safety

Personal information
- Born: November 12, 1976 (age 50); Glen Ellyn, Illinois, U.S.
- Listed height: 6 ft 1 in (1.85 m)
- Listed weight: 207 lb (94 kg)

Career information
- High school: Glenbard West (Glen Ellyn)
- College: Iowa
- NFL draft: 2000: 6th round, 198th overall pick

Career history
- St. Louis Rams (2000–2001); Green Bay Packers (2001–2002); Washington Redskins (2003–2005); Buffalo Bills (2006)

Awards and highlights
- Second-team All-Big Ten (1999)

Career NFL statistics
- Total tackles: 227
- Sacks: 2.0
- Forced fumbles: 3
- Pass deflections: 18
- Interceptions: 4
- Stats at Pro Football Reference

Matthew Sean Bowen (born November 12, 1976) is an American former professional football player who was a safety in the National Football League (NFL). He played college football for the Iowa Hawkeyes, and was selected by the St. Louis Rams in the sixth round of the 2000 NFL draft. Bowen currently works as a sports journalist.

== Early life ==
Bowen was an all-state, all-area and all-conference selection as a quarterback at Glenbard West High School in Glen Ellyn, Illinois. He was originally recruited to Iowa as a quarterback after finishing his senior season as team captain and MVP after passing for 1,533 yards and 17 touchdowns, and gaining 1,329 yards and 17 scores on the ground. He also played three seasons of baseball and four seasons of basketball. His mentor was Hasani Steele, who played in the Rose Bowl with Northwestern University.

== College career ==
Bowen was a four-year letterwinner (1996–99) at the University of Iowa, he started his final two seasons and earned second-team All-America recognition and first-team All-Big Ten honors. He posted a career-high 109 tackles (76 solo) and two INTs as a senior and led the team with 92 tackles (57 solo) and two interceptions as a junior.

== Professional career ==
Pre-draft measurables
Height	Weight	40-yard dash	10-yard split	20-yard split	20-yard shuttle	Three-cone drill	Vertical jump	Broad jump	Bench press	Wonderlic
6 ft 1 1/8 in (1.86 m)	201 lb (91 kg)	4.23 s	1.2 s	2.3 s	4.09 s	7.06 s	46 in (1.17 m)	11 ft 6 in (3.51 m)	20 reps	x
All from NFL Combine.

=== St. Louis Rams ===
Matt Bowen was selected in the sixth round of the 2000 NFL draft by the St. Louis Rams. He was the 198th player to be selected overall and the final player to be selected before the New England Patriots drafted Tom Brady one pick later. He earned St. Louis' Rookie of the Year award after starting at strong safety in two contests and appearing in 16 regular season games. He also saw action in the Rams' Wild Card playoff at New Orleans. He finished the season with 21 tackles (15 solo) and two passes broken up. He also recorded 21 special teams tackles to tie for the club lead.

=== Green Bay Packers ===
In 2001, Bowen signed with the Green Bay Packers to provide depth and help to the Packers secondary and special teams. He started the 2001 campaign with St. Louis, but suffered a broken right foot in the season opener and was inactive for the following two games. He was placed on injured reserve on October 3 and was eventually waived on November 6. He played in Green Bay's last five games on defense and special teams, recording four special teams tackles.

In 2002, Bowen appeared in all 16 games, starting six, contributing as a backup safety, a valued special teams contributor as well as a weekly participant in the club's dime package defense. He was named the starter at strong safety during Weeks 4–7 when Antuan Edwards was sidelined with a fractured forearm. He also started at free safety for Darren Sharper in the regular-season finale. He made his first-career postseason start against Atlanta in the NFC Wild Card playoff contest, responding to the challenge with a game- and career-high 15 tackles and two passes defensed. He finished the season with a career-high 42 tackles (27 solo), good for second among reserves. Bowen also added a forced fumble, one interception and seven passes defended.

=== Washington Redskins ===
Bowen signed with the Washington Redskins as a restricted free agent from the Green Bay Packers in March 2003. For the first time in his NFL career, Bowen started all 16 games in a season. He finished his campaign with 94 tackles (73 solo), three interceptions, two forced fumbles and two fumble recoveries.

In 2004, Bowen started the first five games at strong safety for the Redskins before suffering a torn ACL on his right knee on a special teams play. He was placed on injured reserve on October 11.

In 2005, Bowen saw action in 13 games, tallied 14 tackles, including 13 solo.

=== Buffalo Bills ===
On March 10, 2006, the Washington Redskins released him as an unrestricted free-agent, upon which on March 16, 2006, he signed a two-year, $2 million contract with the Buffalo Bills, which included a $300,000 signing bonus. He appeared in five games for the Bills and was subsequently released on March 1, 2007.

== NFL career statistics ==
Legend
**Bold**	Career high

=== Regular season ===
Year	Team	Games		Tackles					Interceptions					Fumbles			
Year	Team	GP	GS	Cmb	Solo	Ast	Sck	TFL	Int	Yds	TD	Lng	PD	FF	FR	Yds	TD
2000	STL	**16**	2	39	35	4	0.0	0	0	0	0	0	2	0	0	0	0
2001	STL	1	0	0	0	0	0.0	0	0	0	0	0	0	0	0	0	0
2001	GNB	5	0	4	2	2	0.0	0	0	0	0	0	0	0	0	0	0
2002	GNB	**16**	6	60	42	**18**	0.0	0	1	0	0	0	6	0	0	0	0
2003	WAS	**16**	**16**	**85**	**76**	9	0.0	0	**3**	**44**	0	**44**	**7**	**2**	**2**	**5**	0
2004	WAS	5	5	23	19	4	**2.0**	**1**	0	0	0	0	0	1	0	0	0
2005	WAS	13	1	14	13	1	0.0	0	0	0	0	0	3	0	0	0	0
2006	BUF	5	0	2	2	0	0.0	0	0	0	0	0	0	0	0	0	0
		77	30	227	189	38	2.0	1	4	44	0	44	18	3	2	5	0

=== Playoffs ===
Year	Team	Games		Tackles					Interceptions					Fumbles			
Year	Team	GP	GS	Cmb	Solo	Ast	Sck	TFL	Int	Yds	TD	Lng	PD	FF	FR	Yds	TD
2000	STL	1	0	0	0	0	0.0	0	0	0	0	0	0	0	0	0	0
2001	GNB	**2**	0	1	1	0	0.0	0	0	0	0	0	0	0	0	0	0
2002	GNB	1	**1**	**15**	**10**	**5**	0.0	0	0	0	0	0	**2**	0	0	0	0
2005	WAS	1	0	1	1	0	0.0	0	0	0	0	0	0	0	0	0	0
		5	1	17	12	5	0.0	0	0	0	0	0	2	0	0	0	0

== After playing career ==
Bowen currently works as a sports journalist and NFL writer for ESPN where he provides a former player's perspective on the inner workings of the league. He previously spent time working for Bleacher Report and the National Football Post website and has been a contributor to the Chicago Tribune website. He was also contributor on the Boers and Bernstein show.

He also earned a master's in writing and publishing from DePaul University.

Bowen currently is an assistant coach for football at IC Catholic Prep high school in Elmhurst, Illinois, which is the town where Bowen lives.

Bowen and his wife, Shawn, have four sons.
