= Boers and Bernstein =

Radio talk show

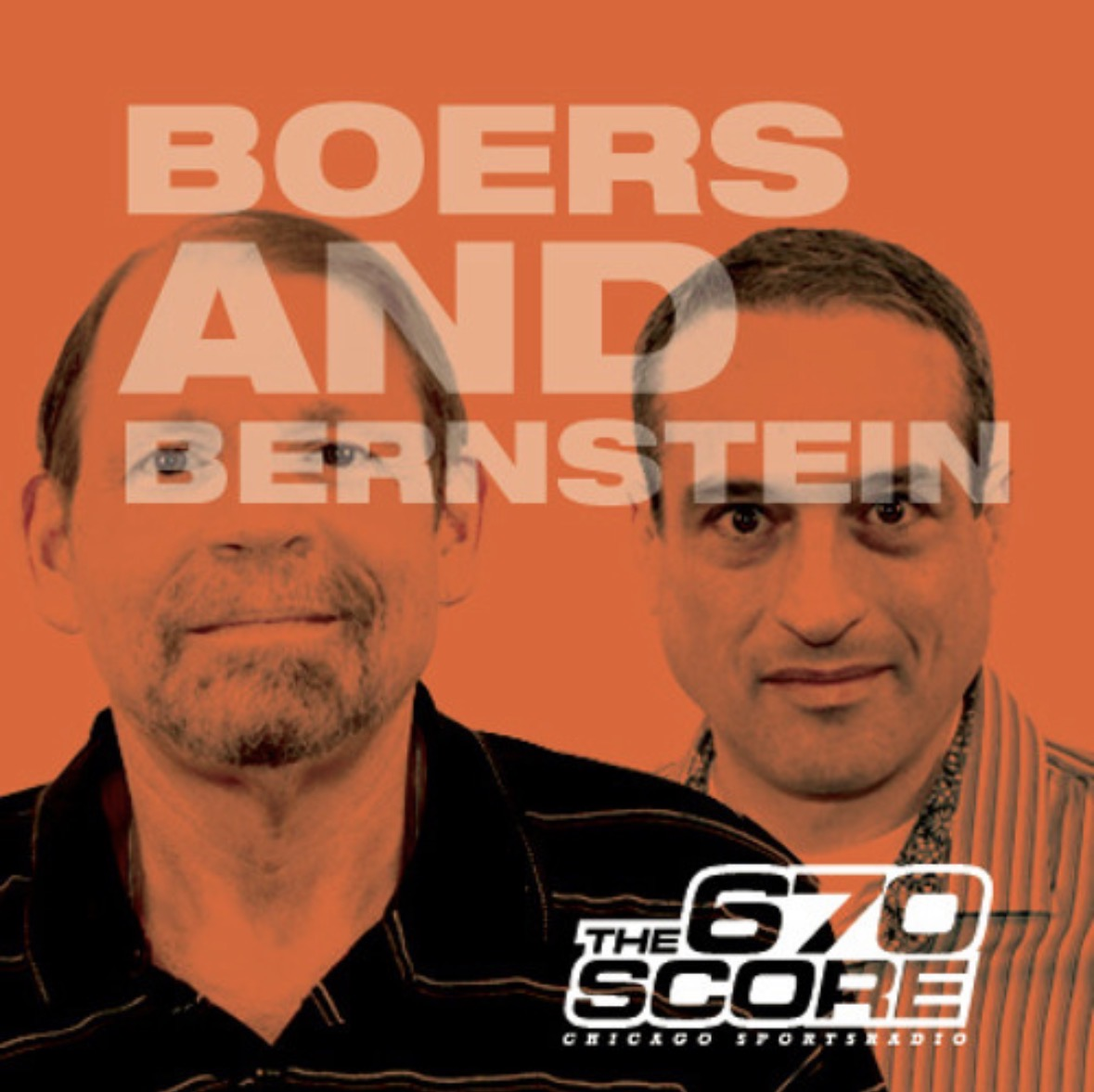
- Genre: Sports talk
- Country of origin: United States
- Language: English
- Home station: WSCR
- Starring: Terry Boers; Dan Bernstein
- Original release: August 16, 1999 – December 22, 2016

Boers and Bernstein was an afternoon drive-time sports talk show on Chicago's WSCR hosted by former Chicago Sun-Times columnist Terry Boers and Dan Bernstein. The pairing debuted on August 16, 1999, and originally aired from 8 a.m. to 12 p.m., then aired from 10a-2p and 2p-6p until moving to its final 1p-6p time slot in 2009, making it one of the longest-running sports talk programs in Chicago. Boers and Bernstein's final show was officially December 22, 2016. Boers died on January 23, 2026, at the age of 75.

== History ==
Station leadership decided to team Boers with Bernstein in early 1999 when Bernstein became a full time on air host at WSCR. Management believed their differing strengths, Boers’ engaging humor and Bernstein’s incisive analysis, would create a dynamic, debate oriented midday program that distinguished itself from solo hosted shows and helped the pairing gain early prominence.

== Segments ==
=== "Who Ya Crappin'?" ===
The program was best known for its signature segment, "Who Ya Crappin'?" that usually aired on Thursdays at 5:00 p.m. unless preempted. The segment took its name from an interview that co-host Terry Boers did with then-Chicago Bears head coach Mike Ditka, in which Boers criticized Ditka for being resigned to his imminent dismissal, and Ditka responded that Boers previously chided Ditka by saying that having a fiery demeanor was "the wrong thing to do, so who ya crappin?" In the spirit of the initial confrontation, listeners were asked to expose—by calling, emailing, or TEXTING (you have to scream that)—a member of or beyond the sports world who has "lied, misled, told a half-truth, a complete falsehood" or, best capturing the essence of the segment, "engaged in an act of verbal hypocrisy." Participants tried to earn the hosts' tacit or sometimes overt approval through well constructed and presented entries, with the key catch phrase concluding each entry. As in everything else on the show, Terry always deferred to Dan on the callers' statements. Callers who failed to approach the exercise correctly (callers needed to focus on something someone said, not something someone did) or took too much time to arrive at the conclusion were taken off the air and chided for their inability to complete the task, usually with the gunshot sound effect previously employed during High Noon.

A list of regular "crappers" at one time included, but wasn't limited to: Gary in Evanston (with his trademark "Oh, hi guys..."), Ten-Foot Midget, Black Physicist, Blind Chauffeur, Stonecutter, Bichiro, Bill Walton's Buck Teeth, Unemployed Lawyer, Government Fromage, North Side Fro Dog, Mr. Mouth, NIU Dave, Steve in Bolingbrook, Quit Playin', K-Man Pilkers in DeKalb, Trash Can Man, Napoleon Dynamite, North Side Pimp, West Side Mike, Quad Cities Pat, Champaign Al and Zed. Gary in Evanston received much publicity from WSCR staff and other local media personnel following his death in July 2013.

First time callers were greeted with the prerecorded "Good luck with your first crap," a quote from the Dennis Franz character, Andy Sipowicz, from NYPD Blue.

- The Second Half - A recap of the first half of the show, followed by brief editorial remarks from the hosts read over "Roundup," a Sam Spence musical number familiar to viewers of NFL Films. Each comment is punctuated by a whistle sound effect.
- Friday Fung- A Friday segment of varying themes as dictated by the hosts. The title of the segment is a play on Ozzie Guillén's Venezuelan-accented pronunciation of the word "fun."
- High Noon- A defunct, yet still popular (and oft-referred to), segment from their previous mid-day time slot, similar in concept to the later "The Second Half," but with a gunshot sound effect after each item. High Noon was revived for one segment on May 12, 2009, and again on March 2, 2011, when the show was on location at White Sox spring training.
- The Extra Point- The hosts offered opinions on a number of topics being covered in the mainstream media.
- Terry's Roar of the Day - Essentially a lengthened editorial-style version of the Extra Point segment, featuring Boers.
- Terry's Thought of the Day - Essentially a shortened version of the Roar of the Day.

B&B at one time gave gift certificates for the "Crapper of the Week," the best caller during the segment, and for the "Best First Time Crapper," to a new caller.

- Mike in Milwaukee - Mike offered up his college and pro football winners each Friday, and then reviewed his performance on Mondays, usually not in the most sober state. Mike frequently referred to the home of the San Francisco 49ers as "Frisco".
- Sit 'em or Bench 'em - Callers gave Dan and Terry two football players at the same position for fantasy football. Dan and Terry then tell the caller which one they should sit and which one they should bench. The segment was born from Dan's frustration with people randomly calling in, asking for fantasy football advise. This segment usually included Dan and Terry reading texts from people who point out that sitting and benching are the same thing. Dan and Terry then made fun of them for not getting the bit.

=== Friday Fung ===
- Am I a Bad Guy: listeners call in with stories of moral ambiguity, and Dan and Terry judge whether or not the caller is a "bad guy".
- Ask Us Anything: listeners ask the hosts anything. The hosts usually answer, and occasionally a guest calls, such as Ken "The Hawk" Harrelson to clarify how the Chicago White Sox "Pick to Click" works, after a listener asked.
- Brushes with Irrelevant Authority
- Cheaters Anonymous: listeners tell stories of cheating
- Crushing Defeats: listeners' tales of losses in life, sports, and other
- Daredevil or Dumbass?: listeners recount dangerous maneuvers which the hosts and producers judge as being exceedingly brave or exceedingly stupid.
- Dumb Arguments
- Dumb Injuries
- Greatest Sports Moments MISSED
- Happy Endings: Listeners called in with their unexpected victories and successes.
- Imaginary Radio: After various callers started their calls by asserting that the hosts said things they didn't, this segment was created, where callers are encouraged to posit various things they imagined was said on the radio. An example was several callers saying that Boers and Bernstein said the Tour de France was a sport, contrary to B&B's position, after which another said that B&B never said that bicycling was a sport, but that Sheryl Crow had given Lance Armstrong testicular cancer.
- Live Ringers: Listeners retell stories of playing involved in pick-up or amateur level sporting events in which current or professional players are brought in as ringers, thus making the game extremely lopsided. Former NBA player Dave Corzine is an oft-referenced ringer in this segment.
- Mundane Sports Achievements: listeners recount vaguely athletic achievements in venues which can only barely be construed as sports, such as successfully hitting targets with litter from a car window.
- Relative Greatness: participants recount tales of their family members' celebrity encounters. Dave Corzine is a commonly encountered celebrity.
- Tales of Laziness: participants describe situations of extreme laziness, sometimes with unexpected vaguely athletic tie-ins along the lines of throwing a tennis ball at a television to successfully change the channel when the remote is out of reach.
- Sports Apologies: participants stage mock apologetic press conferences for sports figures.
- Ask Brian Urlacher Anything: listeners' questions are answered with a pre-recorded short quip by the Chicago Bears' middle linebacker from a press event where Urlacher responded to questions with monosyllabic answers or said "go to foxsports.com."
- Ask Rusty: listeners solicit advice from noted caller "Rusty from Stickney (then Jacksonville, now Cincinnati)," who dispenses uneducated stereotypical blue-collar wisdom. Rusty's association with the show dates to when he called back, saying that he was being kidded at work for being misquoted, until Boers and Bernstein played back the tape.
- Sports Collectible Items You Just Can't Get Rid Of
- Stupid Putts: Tales of golfing misadventures. Usually done around the Masters or the U.S. Open golf tournaments.
- Wild at Heart: listeners recount outrageous attempts at picking up women, usually during Valentine's Day week
- Working Rules: listeners' stories of noncompliance with a rule
- CTA-Holes: listeners' stories of public transportation misadventures on the CTA, Metra, and other public transportation (began August 31, 2012).
- Inconsequential Brushes With Inconsequential Greatness: listeners' stories of their brushes with inconsequential greatness (began August 2, 2013).

If Who Ya Crappin? is preempted, it often becomes the theme for that week's Friday Fung.

=== Quote of the Year ===
Every year, typically in December, they compiled a list of the best quotes from that given year. They also handed out other consolation prizes and the ultimate winner of the quote of the year was inscribed on the 'Larry Horse's Ass Trophy'.

Previous winners of QOTY include:

- 2002: Dick Jauron
  - "It's not my show, but I'm on that show."
- 2003: Tom Skutnik
  - "We ain't no white trash."
- 2004: Hawk Harrelson
  - "Early 90s was an different era than after the early 90s. An entirely different era."
- 2005: Mary in La Porte
  - "Well maybe Mike North knows."
- 2006: Johnny "Red" Kerr
  - "You know who Szczerbiak reminds me of now? I forgot."
- 2007: Suzyn Waldman
  - "Roger Clemens is in George's box, and Roger Clemens is comin' back! Oh my good... goodness gracious!"
- 2008: George Ofman
  - "Skip Paray... uh, Skip Caray, whose pappy was the legendary Harry, and whose son is Skip, died in his sleep last night... make that his son, Chip."
- 2009: Joe in Evanston
  - "The person who I was honoring was the mother of my best man at my funeral."
- 2010: Mel Gibson
  - "Stay on this phone and don't hang up on me, I have plenty of energy to drive over there. Do you understand me? AND I WILL!"
- 2011: Tyler Hansbrough
  - "One day he was doing nothing, his usual pastime, when a corn fell from the sky and hit him on the head" (reading from Chicken Little)
- 2012: Hawk Harrelson
  - "Sacks packed with Seamen" (reference to the Seattle Mariners)
- 2013: Chris Rongey
  - "I know that you've probably been on a plane where you don't get peanuts on that particular day, they're not handing them out. That's because somebody on that plane has an allergy. It's really horrible." (Rongey's enunciation of "peanuts" was close to "penis")
- 2014: Marc Trestman
  - "I haven't heard any of that. I didn't hear all of it. I heard a lot about most of it, but what I did hear...I didn't hear any of that."
- 2015: Tim Beckman
  - "We use the word Oskee not just because of the word Oskee or that it’s a battle cry of the University of Illinois. But it also stands for something. That stance that we use that word for is Our Success equals the Knowledge of being — the K, the knowledge, of being a great student-athlete on and off the football field. Understanding how to be supportive. How to understand to be successful in the classroom. The E stands for Effort, giving all-out effort in everything you do each and every day. And then the last E stands for Energy. Energy, being a positive influence on the people around you. Having that belief and that system as being a teammate, being a brother, the band of brothers."
- 2016: John Lackey
  - "Great expectations? I mean, we’re trying to win a World Series. I didn’t come here for a haircut. We’re trying to get it on. I came here for jewelry."

=== Person of the Year ===
The Person of the Year award honored the person who had impacted the show the most throughout the past year. The inaugural award, voted on by listeners, was given to Gary from Evanston who had died earlier in the year.

- 2013: Gary from Evanston

=== Tournament of Bad ===
Every year, during the College Basketball tournament, a list of bad events, news stories, etc. were compiled and organized into a bracket that listeners were given the chance to vote on, ultimately selecting the winner. For 2012, the Tournament of Bad used user suggested events/contestants to form the brackets.

Previous winners of the Tournament of Bad include:

- 2008: People Who Say They Can't Find Work (This became a joke in its own right due to the ironic timing of it occurring shortly before the Great Recession.)
- 2009: People Who Use Bluetooth When Not Driving
- 2010: Rod Blagojevich
- 2011: Hopping on Lake Shore Drive in the middle of a blizzard (A reference to the disastrous mistake made by many motorists during the Groundhog Day Blizzard of that year as their vehicles became trapped in snow and ice.)
- 2012: The State Of Pennsylvania
- 2013: The Paterno Family
- 2014: Wrigley Rooftop Owners (Their opposition to the modernization of Wrigley Field was insufferable; ask anyone.)
- 2015: Anti-Vaxxers
- 2016: Jared Fogle

== Frequent guests and contributors ==
- Gerry DiNardo
- Steve Lavin
- Jimmy Piersall
- Steve Stone
- Hub Arkush
- Brian Billick
- Matt Bowen
- Len Kasper
- Ken Rosenthal

== Notable events ==
- A caller inadvertently created a new character for the show, when he phoned in and chastised Boers, mistakenly calling him Larry Horse. Larry Horse, though fictitious, became a "member" of the show, and though he never spoke, was often mentioned, sometimes in skits.
- An elderly lady, "Caller Anne", once called Dan Bernstein and Steve Silverman (filling in for a vacationing Boers) asking exasperatedly for the score of Detroit and the Rams. This was presumably for gambling purposes. It led to the famous quote "you have the papers damn it", and "my blood pressure is going up!"
- Dan Bernstein flipped out at a caller when he called to suggest the White Sox sign Dmitri Young rather than try to trade for Adam Dunn. The scream that Dan made has been replayed on many occasions when a caller frustrates the show's hosts.
- A listener to the show edited the Bearforce 1 Wikipedia page to add Dan Bernstein as a "founding member" of the openly gay musical group (Bearforce 1 is also the nickname for the team jet of the Chicago Bears). Upon learning this, the name of that group, "Bear Force One", has now become a recurring joke on the show. reference
- During one show, an audio clip of Tyler Hansbrough reading "Chicken Little" was played (originally recorded for a promotion involving the Indiana Pacers and a local library), in which Hansbrough's terrible reading including his misspeak of "a corn fell" instead of "an acorn fell" has become a show staple when speaking of 'stupid' people or people who were home-schooled.
- Multiple media links fell for a hoax in late 2012, reporting Terry Boers had turned 70. Boers was born in 1950.
- The beginning of the French National Anthem is played when an unpopular player is traded or released, a coach or manager is fired, or whenever a famous athlete or celebrity dies.
- Terry Boers announced his retirement, effective January 5, 2017. He died on January 23, 2026.
