= Wrigley Rooftops =

Apartments by Wrigley Field, Chicago

Coordinates: 41°56′54.8″N 87°39′14.5″W

- Company type: Private LLC
- Website: www.wrigleyrooftopsllc.com

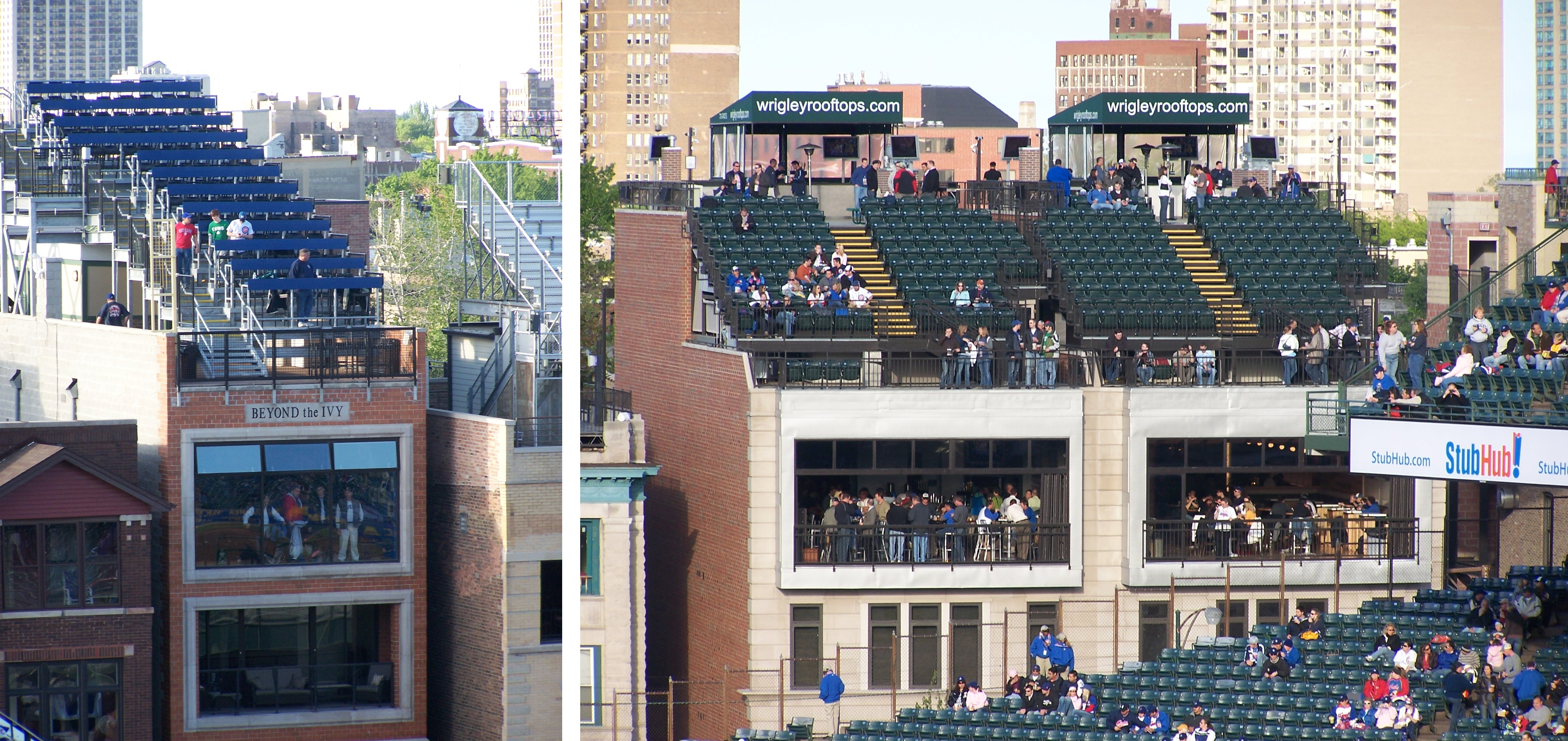
From left to right: stands beyond left field, stands beyond right field

Wrigley Rooftops is a name for the sixteen rooftops of residential buildings which have bleachers or seating on them to view baseball games or other major events at Wrigley Field. Since 1914 Wrigley roofs have dotted the neighborhood of Wrigleyville around Wrigley Field, where the Chicago Cubs play Major League Baseball. Venues on Waveland Avenue overlook left field, while those along Sheffield Avenue have a view over right field.

The rooftops had always been a gathering place for free views of the game, but until the 1980s, the observers were usually just a few dozen people watching from the flat rooftops, windows and porches of the buildings, with "seating" consisting of a few folding chairs, and with little commercial impact on the team. When the popularity of the Cubs began to rise in the 1980s, formal seating structures began to appear, and building owners began charging admission, much to the displeasure of Cubs management, who saw it as an unreasonable encroachment.

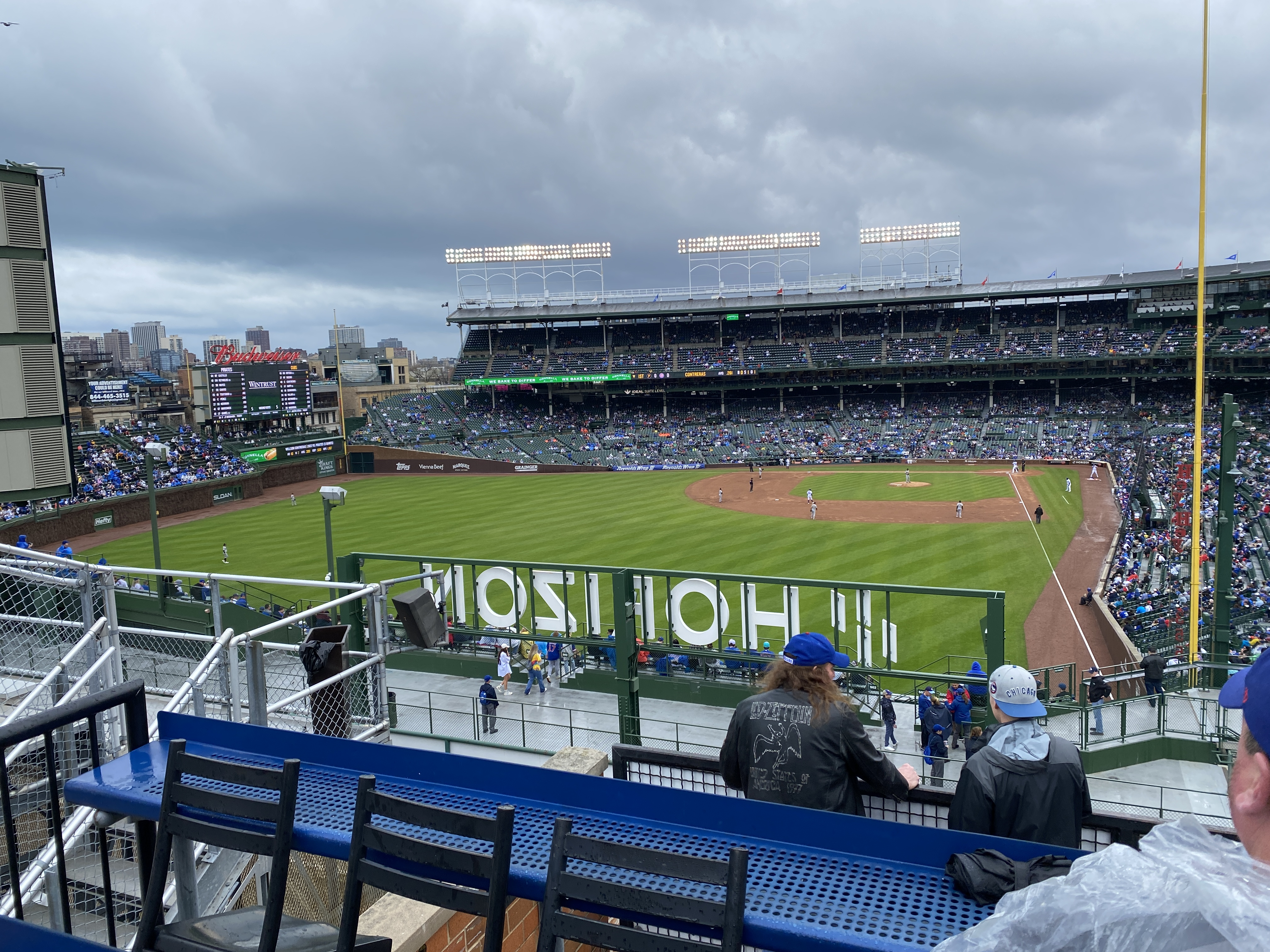
View from 1038 W Waveland

Various methods of combating this phenomenon were discussed. The idea of a "spite fence", as with Shibe Park in Philadelphia, or the Cubs' previous home, West Side Park, was discussed. The idea was not implemented, nor was it fully abandoned. Before Opening Day in 2002, a "wind screen" was temporarily erected on the ballpark's back screen behind the outfield wall, obscuring some of the view from Wrigley roofs.

When the majority were independent of Cub affiliate ownership prior to 2016, the Wrigleyville Rooftops Association's members were the 16 rooftop venues. Wrigley Rooftops is the Ricketts family's marketing arm and brand for their rooftop holdings through Greystone Sheffield Holdings and Hickory Street Capital.

== History ==
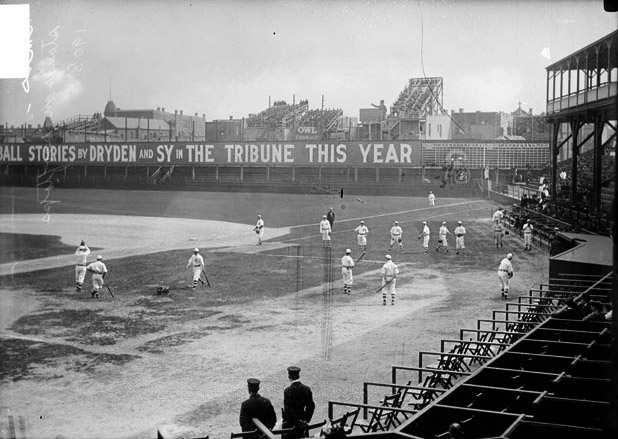
West Side Park with "bootleg bleachers" before a tall fence was built

Soon after Wrigley opened in 1914, the rooftops sprung up around the ball field. In the 1938 World Series, when the Cubs played the Yankees, The Sheffield Baseball Club was the first to charge for admission.

In 2000, real estate investor Donal Barry, through an entity, purchased 1010 W. Waveland (Beyond the Ivy I) and 1048 W. Waveland (originally Beyond The Ivy III, then Sky Lounge Wrigley Rooftop now 1048 Sky Lounge). Barry's entity in 2004 purchased 1038 W. Waveland (Beyond The Ivy II).

In 2002, the Cubs organization filed a lawsuit against the different facilities for copyright infringement. Since operators charge admission to use their amenities and sell licenses to view Major League Baseball, the Cubs asserted that the facilities were illegally using a copyrighted game and sued for royalties. In 2004, 11 of the 13 roofs settled with the club out of court, agreeing to pay 17% of gross revenue in exchange for official endorsement. The city also began investigating the structural integrity of the roofs, issuing citations to those in danger of collapse. With the Cubs and the neighbors reaching agreement, many of the facilities began to feature seating structures: some with bleachers, some with chair seats, and even one with a steel-girdered double deck of seats (see photo). The agreement was to last until 2023.

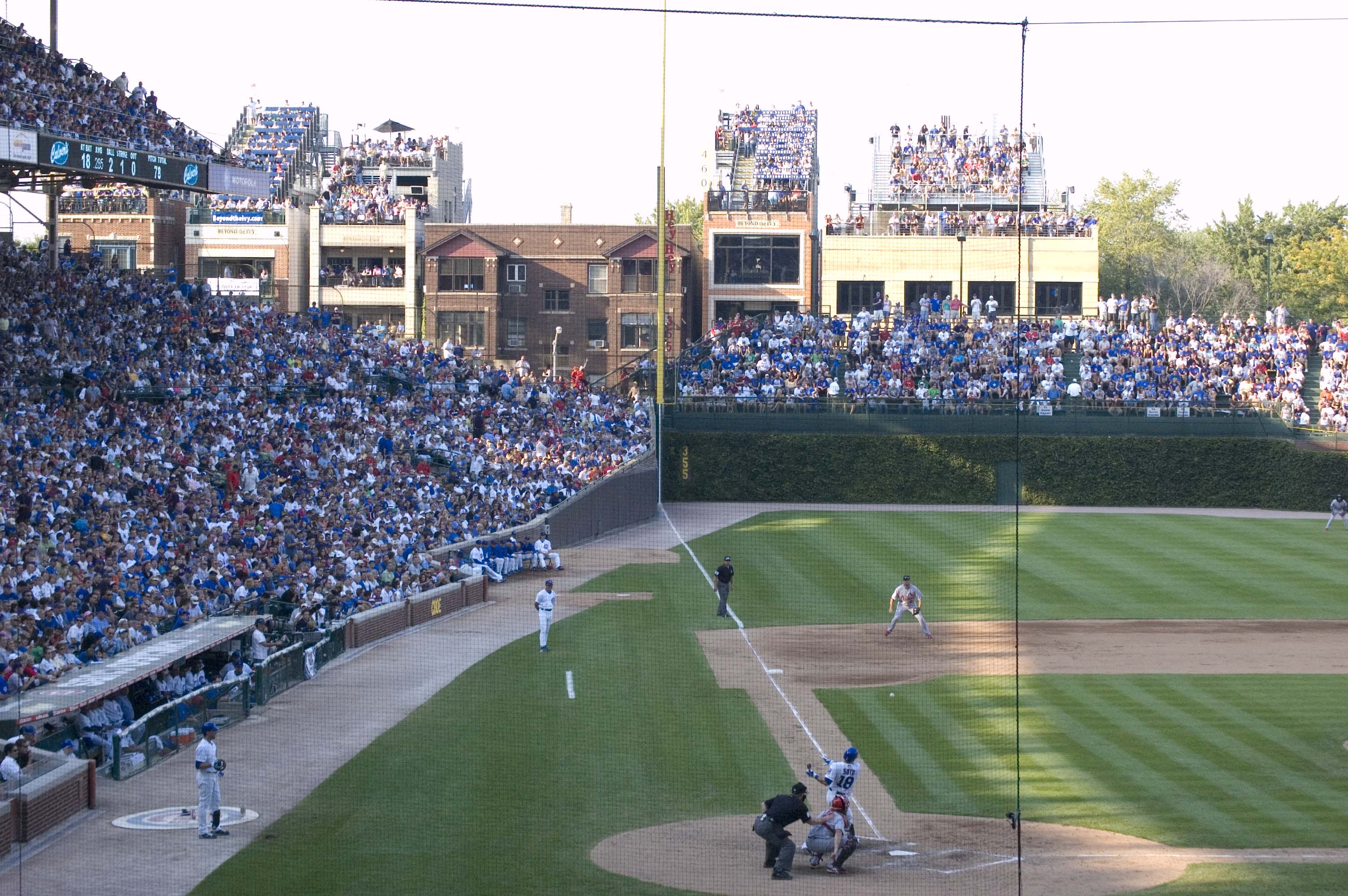
Left field rooftops in 2008

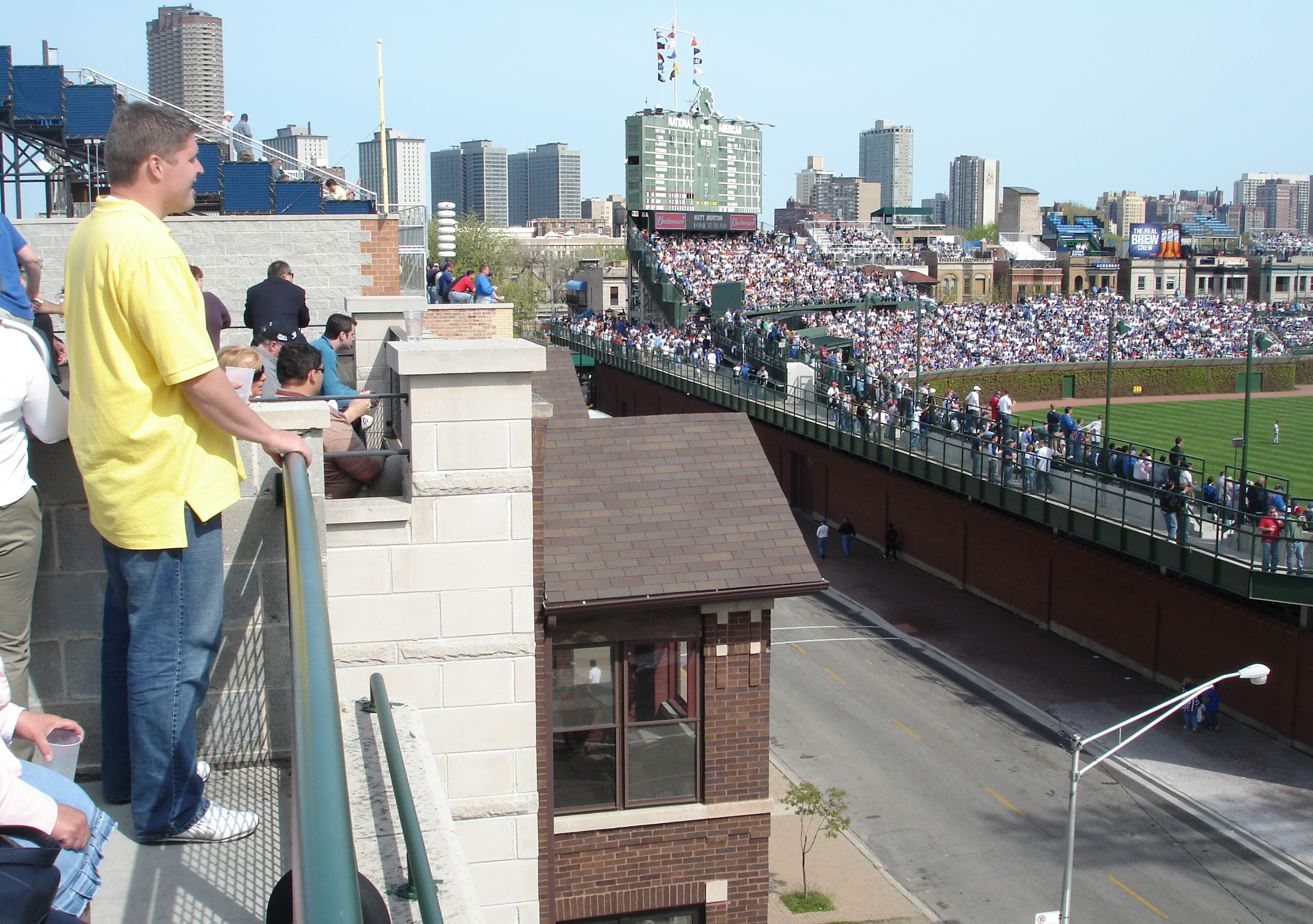
View from a left field roof

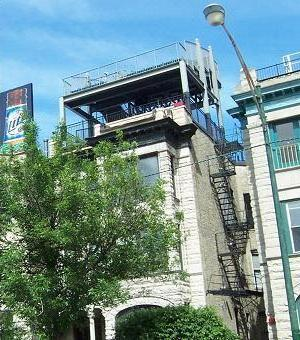
Wrigley double-deck
rooftop seating

In 2013, principal owner Thomas S. Ricketts sought Commission on Chicago Landmarks permission to build "additional seating, new lighting, four additional LED signs of up to 650 square feet (60 m^{2}) and a 2,400-square-foot (220 m^{2}) video board in right field." Ricketts said Wrigley has "the worst player facilities in Major League Baseball". When the roof owners threatened to sue he tempered the design to just "a sign in right field and a video board in left field." After the roof owners did not rescind their threat to sue, Ricketts said in May 2014 that he would attempt to proceed with the original plan even if the matter was fought in court. The Wrigleyville Rooftop Association claim in 2014 that its members spend $50 million to renovate their venues to code after agreeing to revenue-sharing. On January 20, 2015, the roof owners filed a lawsuit in federal court against the Cubs and Ricketts, citing breach of contract.

The Ricketts family, owners of the Cubs, began purchasing the rooftop properties in order to control the marketable sight lines into the stadium and by the end of the 2016 season, owned (or controlled via agreement) 11 of the rooftop locations. This led to a dispute with the Major League Baseball Players Association and other MLB clubs, which argued that these acquisitions made the rooftops' receipts baseball-related revenue for the purposes of revenue sharing.

In 2015, a family venture bought 3643 N. Sheffield Ave. building, 3639 N. Sheffield and 1032 W. Waveland. A Jerry Lasky-managed entity sold 3617, 3619 and 3637 N. Sheffield to the Ricketts in May 2015. Hickory Street Capital, a venture of the Ricketts family, took a stake in the Down the Line Rooftop (3621-3625 Sheffield Ave.) along with right of first refusal in 2010. James and Camelia Petrozzini moved their share of Down the Line to a living trust then the Petrozzini died in 2014. Hickory Street sued that the trust transfer violated the right of first refusal. Ricketts family ventures outright purchased seven rooftop buildings while purchase the mortgages on three Sheffield rooftop properties in receivership. The Petrozzini Trust agreed to sell Down the Line Rooftop to Hickory Street in December 2016. Ricketts family's Greystone Sheffield Holdings bought the three W. Waveland rooftops from Donal Barry on January 13, 2016. Also in January, the Ricketts launched its Wrigley Rooftops marketing brand and arm. The Ricketts family add the Brixen Ivy located at 1044 W Waveland to its rooftop portfolio.

In May 2017, the Cubs and the Rickets family formed Marquee Sports & Entertainment as a central sales and marketing company for the various Rickets family sports and entertainment assets, the Cubs, Wrigley Rooftops and Hickory Street Capital. As part of this process, the Cubs agreed to count the rooftops' revenues along with regular Wrigley Field receipts for the purposes of revenue sharing.

== Rooftop venues ==
Rooftop	address	Wrigley Rooftops	Info	Source
Wrigley View Rooftop	1050 W. Waveland Avenue			
Brixen Ivy	1044 Waveland	Ricketts (May 2016)		
Beyond the Ivy I	1010 W. Waveland	Greystone Sheffield Holdings (1/2016)	held by Real estate investor Donal Barry's venture in 2000 to January 13, 2016	
1048 Sky Lounge	1048 Waveland	Greystone Sheffield Holdings (1/2016)	held by Real estate investor Donal Barry's venture in 2000 to January 13, 2016	
Beyond the Ivy II	1038 W. Waveland	Greystone Sheffield Holdings (1/2016)	Barry's entity purchased in 2004	
Wrigleyville Rooftops 1	1032 Waveland	Ricketts		
Murphy's Rooftop	3653 N. Sheffield Ave		beyond the center-field scoreboard	
Wrigleyville Rooftops 3	3643 Sheffield		Ricketts	
3639 Wrigley Rooftop	3639 North Sheffield		Ricketts	
Sheffield Baseball Club	3619 Sheffield Avenue	right-field fence; was the first to charge in 1938; owned in 2005 by Tom Gramatis; on top of The Inn at Wrigleyville	Ricketts	
Wrigley Field Rooftop Club	3617 Sheffield Avenue	owned in 2005 by Tom Gramatis	Ricketts	
Ivy League Baseball Club	3637 Sheffield Avenue	owned in 2005 by Tom Gramatis	Ricketts	
Lakeview Baseball Club	3633 Sheffield		Right Field Properties	
Skybox on Sheffield	3627 Sheffield		Right Field Properties	
Down the Line Rooftop	3621-3625 Sheffield Ave.	Hickory Street (12/2016)	sued that the trust transfer violated the right of first refusal. Ricketts family ventures outright purchased seven rooftop buildings while purchase the mortgages on three Sheffield rooftop properties in receivership. The Petrozzini Trust agreed to sell Down the Line Rooftop to Hickory Street in December 2016.	
Wrigleyville Rooftops 2	3609 N. Sheffield	independent	formerly Sports Corner	

== Hickory Street Capital ==
Hickory Street Capital is a Wrigleyville development company owned by the Joe Ricketts family.

Hickory Street Capital, a venture of the Ricketts family, took a stake in the Down the Line Rooftop (3621-3625 Sheffield Ave.) along with right of first refusal in 2010. James and Camelia Petrozzini moved their share of Down the Line to a living trust then the Petrozzini died in 2014. Hickory Street sued that the trust transfer violated the right of first refusal. Ricketts family ventures outright purchased seven rooftop buildings while purchase the mortgages on three Sheffield rooftop properties in receivership. The Petrozzini Trust agreed to sell Down the Line Rooftop to Hickory Street in December 2016

In May 2017, the Cubs and the Rickets family formed Marquee Sports & Entertainment as a central sales and marketing company for the various Rickets family sports and entertainment assets, the Chicago Cubs, Wrigley Rooftops and Hickory Street Capital.

The Hotel Wrigley project was announced by Hickory Street Capital in 2013 for the northwest corner of Clark and Addison across from Wrigley Field with a faux-historic baseball theme. In September 2016, the project was rechristened Hotel Zachary after the 1914 ballpark’s architect Zachary Taylor Davis with a new design by architect VOA Associates. Starwood Hotels & Resorts was brought on board to manage the hotel expect to open in 2018. On April 10, 2017, the Park at Wrigley outdoor plaza was opened to the public on the same day as the Chicago Cubs' home opener.

=== Portfolio ===
- Down the Line Rooftop

Gallagher Way Plaza (April 10, 2017) and development

- North Building, 1101 W Waveland
  - American Airlines Conference Center
  - Chicago Cubs Front Office
  - Marquee Sports & Entertainment
  - Motorola World Series Trophy Room
- West Building, 3630 N Clark Street
  - Hotel Zachary (opened March 28, 2018) managed by Starwood Hotels & Resorts

== Marquee Sports & Entertainment ==
Marquee Sports & Entertainment LLC (MSE) is a sales and marketing company for the various Rickets family sports and entertainment assets, the Cubs, Wrigley Rooftops and Hickory Street Capital. Marquee is headquartered in the Gallagher Way's North Building. Hickory Street properties included are the new Park at Wrigley, the American Airlines Conference Center in the new Cubs headquarters adjacent to the ballpark, and Hotel Zachary. The company was draws on the famous Wrigley Field marquee.

Marquee Sports & Entertainment was formed in May 2017. The Cubs’ existing corporate partnerships and sales teams of 30 were transferred to Marquee.

Day-to-day operating heads are the two co-managing directors, Allen Hermeling, Cubs senior director of corporate partnerships, and Andy Blackburn, Cubs senior director of ticket sales. Also involved is Crane Kenney, Cubs president of business operations, as MSE officer and Colin Faulkner, Cubs senior vice president of sales and marketing as senior vice president of MSE directly over the co-managing directors.
