= Richard Durham =

American radio show writer (1917–1984)

- Born: September 6, 1917; Raymond, Hinds County, Mississippi
- Died: April 27, 1984 (aged 66); New York City, New York
- Resting place: Burr Oak Cemetery, Alsip, Illinois
- Education: Hyde Park High School; Northwestern University
- Occupations: Writer (radio and books)
- Known for: Promotion of American civil rights
- Notable work: Destination Freedom
- Spouse: Clarice Davis
- Children: Mark Durham
- Awards: Radio Hall of Fame; National Recording Registry (Library of Congress); Audie Award for Autobiography or Memoir

Richard Isadore Durham (September 6, 1917 – April 27, 1984) was an African-American writer and radio producer.

== Early life ==
Durham was born in Raymond, Hinds County, Mississippi, and moved with his family to Chicago in 1921. He attended Hyde Park High School and Northwestern University.

== Career ==
Beginning in 1939, Durham worked on the Illinois Writer's Project (part of the Federal Writers' Project). In 1940 he wrote two short radio dramas entitled The Story of Winslow Homer and The Story of Auguste Rodin. An essay, "The philosophical basis of Sterling McMurrin", was also published.

Leaving the IWP in 1942, Durham worked as a freelance writer. Two national shows, The Lone Ranger and Ma Perkins, used his scripts. Durham wrote for New Masses, the Chicago Defender, the Chicago Star and the Illinois Standard newspapers. At the same time he joined the Communist Party, USA.

His first radio series was Democracy – USA, sponsored by the Chicago Defender. It aired in 1946 on Chicago's WBBM. The next year he started the dramatic Black soap opera radio series Here Comes Tomorrow on WJJD.

=== Destination Freedom ===
Following his early radio writings, Durham wrote and produced the radio drama Destination Freedom. In cooperation with The Chicago Defender, he began this series over NBC Chicago outlet WMAQ in July 1948, with scripts emphasizing the progress of African-Americans from the days of slavery to the ongoing struggle for racial justice. Two episodes – "A Garage in Gainesville" and "Execution Awaited" – are part of the Library of Congress National Recording Registry.

=== Post-Destination Freedom ===
After Destination Freedom Durham was the national program director of the United Packinghouse Workers of America. He resigned in 1958. He then was a press agent for T. R. Howard during Howard's 1958 run for Congress.

==== Muhammed Speaks editing ====
In the 1960s Durham was the editor of Muhammad Speaks, a Nation of Islam newspaper in Chicago.

=== Bird of the Iron Feather soap opera ===
While an editor of Muhammed Speaks Durham created a soap opera for Chicago's WTTW television station. Bird of the Iron Feather was the first all-Black television soap opera, and ran for 21 episodes, three times a week starting in January 1970. The show's title came from a speech by Frederick Douglass given in 1847.

=== Other media ===
He had a supporting role in the 1972 film Sounder. He also co-wrote The Greatest: My Own Story, the 1975 autobiography of Muhammad Ali. The book was adapted into a 1977 movie of the same name. In 1980 Ali and Durham wrote the article "Why I Must Fight" for Umoja Sasa.

Durham also wrote for the Illinois Writers Project, Here Comes Tomorrow (WJJD/Chicago) and Ebony Magazine. His own short book of poetry, Night Windowpanes, was published in 1975.

=== Political activity ===
During Harold Washington's 1982 mayoral election Durham worked to improve Washington's political speeches.

== Personal life ==
From at least the late 1940s until his death, Durham was married to fellow Northwestern alumnus and prominent Chicago educator Clarice Davis (1919–2018), with whom he had one child, a son, Mark.

Durham died on April 27, 1984, of a heart attack while on a trip to New York City. Following a memorial cemetery at A. A. Rayner and Sons mortuary, his cremated remains were interred at Burr Oak Cemetery in Alsip, Illinois.

== See also ==
- Golden Age of Radio
- Carlton Moss – a 1930–40s Black radio dramatist
- Roi Ottley – journalist and writer who wrote the radio series New World A'Coming, broadcast by WMCA in New York City in 1944
