= Destination Freedom =

Two American anthology radio series (1948–1950/51)

- Genre: Dramatic anthology
- Running time: 30 minutesSunday mornings
- Home station: WMAQ
- Starring: Oscar Brown Jr., Vernon Jarrett, Janice Kingslow, Fred Pinkard, Studs Terkel, Wezlyn Tilden; also, Maurice Copeland, Tony Parrish, Jack Gibson, Harris Gaines, Louise Pruitt, Arthur Peterson, Norma Ransom, Forrest Lewis, Hope Summers, Boris Apion, Jess Pugh, Ted Liss, Don Gallagher, Harry Elders, Everett Clarke, Jack Lester, Art Hern, Les Spears, Dean Olmquist, Russ Reed
- Announcer: Hugh Downs
- Created by: Richard Durham
- Written by: Richard Durham, Ray Derby, William Hodapp, Bob Ecklund, Madeline Peters, Billie McKee, Bob McKee, Christine Squires, Martin Maloney, Charles Flynn
- Directed by: Homer Heck, Dick Loughran, Norman Felton, Bob Wambold, John Cowan, Larry Auerbach
- Produced by: Homer Heck Donnie L Betts
- Executive producer: Judith Waller
- Recording studio: Chicago
- Original release: June 27, 1948 – November 19, 1951
- Opening theme: "Oh, Freedom"
- Sponsored by: The Chicago Defender, Chicago Urban League (1950), United Negro College Fund

Destination Freedom was a series of weekly radio programs that was produced by WMAQ in Chicago. The first set ran from 1948 to 1950 and it presented the biographical histories of prominent African Americans such as George Washington Carver, Satchel Paige, Frederick Douglass, Harriet Tubman, and Lena Horne. The scripts for those shows were written by Richard Durham. Studs Terkel voiced some of the radio characters. Hugh Downs also served as an announcer in both the initial and 1950 series.

== History ==
The second series of shows ran from 1950 to 1951, and it was produced without Durham. This second series featured patriotic themed dramas that were largely based on Americanism and anti-Communism.

The show was the brainchild of African-American journalist and author Richard Durham. In cooperation with The Chicago Defender, he began this series over NBC Chicago outlet WMAQ in June 1948, with scripts emphasizing the progress of African Americans from the days of slavery to the ongoing struggle for racial justice. Airing in Sunday-morning public-service time, the series built a steady audience in the Midwest, with inspirational stories of social progress, earning strong support from Civil Rights organizations, and offering employment to a wide range of African-American performers. Episodes began with a stanza from the spiritual "Oh, Freedom".

Destination Freedom premiered on June 27, 1948, on Chicago radio WMAQ. Durham's vision was to re-educate the masses on the image of African-American society, since he believed that it was tainted with inaccurate and derogatory stereotypes. Week after week, Durham would challenge these stereotypes by illustrating the lives of prominent African Americans. For two years, Durham wrote script after script for Destination Freedom, receiving no financial compensation for his effort. In 1950, Durham's financial needs forced him to accept an offer by Don Ameche to write material for him. It is also said that Durham's relationship with NBC and WMAQ was not entirely harmonious. Continuing without Durham, the final year of the program turned to general themes of "American freedom", without the sharp focus on the African-American experience. This, WMAQ hoped, would create a show to rival Paul Revere Speaks, a popular show at the time. For about 50 years, the show was long forgotten until some transcripts were found, and the characters voiced by Fred Pinkard, Oscar Brown Jr., Wezlyn Tilden, and Janice Kingslow, were heard once more.

Two early recordings, "A Garage in Gainesville" and "Execution Awaited", are listed in National Recording Registry. In 1949, it received a first-place commendation from the Ohio State University Institute for Education by Radio.

== Richard Durham episodes ==
1948 episodes
1. The Knock-Kneed Man – Crispus Attucks – June 27 and July 30, 1950
2. Railway to Freedom – Harriet Tubman – July 4
3. Dark Explorers – Moors who helped explore New Spain – July 11
4. The Denmark Vesey Story – community leader in Charleston, South Carolina (c. 1767–1822) – July 18
5. The Making of a Man – Frederick Douglass: Part 1 – June 27
6. The Key to Freedom – Frederick Douglass: Part 2 – August 1
7. The Heart of George Cotton – doctors Daniel Hale Williams and Ulysses Grant Dailey – August 8 and October 31.
8. Truth Goes to Washington – Sojourner Truth – August 15
9. Arctic Autograph – Matthew Henson – August 22
10. The Story of 1875 – Charles Caldwell – August 29
11. Poet in Pine Mill – James Weldon Johnson – September 5
12. The Father of the Blues – W. C. Handy – September 12
13. Boy with a Dream – J. Ernest Wilkins Jr. – September 19
14. Shakespeare of Harlem – Langston Hughes – September 26
15. Citizen – Toussaint l'Ouverture and the Haitian Revolution – October 3
16. Little David – Joe Louis – October 10
17. The Boy Who Was Traded for a Horse – George Washington Carver – October 17
18. Repeat performance of The Heart of George Cotton – October 31
19. Echoes of Harlem – Duke Ellington – November 7
20. One Out of Seventeen – Mary McLeod Bethune – November 14
21. The Rhyme of the Ancient Dodger – Jackie Robinson – November 21
22. Investigator for Democracy – Walter Francis White – November 28
23. Autobiography of a Hero – Doris ("Dorie") Miller – December 5
24. The Pied Piper Versus Paul Revere – Albert Merritt – founder of the Boys Club of Martinsville, Indiana – December 12
25. Choir Girl from Philadelphia – Marian Anderson – December 19
26. Mike Rex – author Willard Motley – December 26
1949 episodes
27. Maiden Speech – Oscar Stanton De Priest – January 2
28. The Boy Who Beat the Bus – Governor William H. Hastie – January 9
29. The Chopin Murder Case – Hazel Scott – January 16
30. The World's Fastest Human – Jesse Owens – January 23
31. Last Letter Home – 332nd Fighter Group (Tuskegee Airmen) – January 30 and August 13, 1950
32. Searcher for History W.E.B. Du Bois – February 6
33. The Death of Aesop – February 13 and November 27
34. Peace Mediator – Dr. Ralph J Bunche – February 20 and August 6, 1950
35. The Houses That Paul Built – Paul R. Williams – February 27
36. Do Something! Be Somebody! – Canada Lee – March 6
37. Up From Slavery – Booker T. Washington – March 13
38. Black Boy – Richard Wright – March 20
39. Transfusion – Charles R. Drew and his work on blood transfusion – March 27
40. Pagan Poet – Countee Cullen – April 3
41. Woman with a Mission – Ida B. Wells – April 10
42. Before I Sleep – poet Paul Laurence Dunbar – April 17
43. Apostle of Freedom – Richard Allen – April 24
44. Help the Blind – Josh White – May 1
45. The Ballad of Satchel Paige – May 15
46. The Secretary of Peace – Benjamin Banneker – May 22
47. The Saga of Melody Jackson – Henry Armstrong – May 29
48. Anatomy of an Ordinance – Alderman Rev. Archibald Carey – June 5
49. Negro Cinderella – Lena Horne – June 12
50. Ghost Editor – Roscoe Dunjee – June 19
51. Harriet's Children (First anniversary program) – June 26
52. Norfolk Miracle – Dorothy Maynor – July 3 (rebroadcast February 2002 by KGNU)
53. Tales of Stackalee (Black folklore hero) – July 17
54. The Legend of John Henry – a retelling of the folk hero story – July 24
55. The Trumpet Talks – Louis Armstrong – July 31
56. The Long Road – Mary Church Terrell – August 7
57. Black Hamlet, Part I – Henri Christophe (life as a slave) – August 14
58. Black Hamlet, Part II – Henri Christophe (rise to power) – August 21
59. Segregation Incorporated – National Committee on Segregation in the Nation's Capital, 1947–51 – August 28; rebroadcast in January 2003 by KGNU
60. The Saga of Senator Blanche K. Bruce – September 4
61. The Tiger Hunt – the 761st Tank Battalion in World War II – September 11
62. Poet in Bronzeville – Gwendolyn Brooks – September 18
63. A Garage in Gainesville – retelling of a lynching in a small southern town – September 25
64. Execution Awaited – a simulated court trial examining prejudice and racism – October 2
65. Father to Son – Adam Clayton Powell Sr. and Adam Clayton Powell Jr. – October 9, rebroadcast in August 2002 by station KGNU
66. Of Blood and the Boogie – Albert Ammons – October 16
67. Diary of a Nurse – Jane Edna Hunter – October 23
68. Keeper of the Dream – Captain Hugh Mulzac, commander of the SS Booker T. Washington – October 30
69. The Man Who Owned Chicago – Jean Baptiste Point du Sable – November 6
70. Blind Alley Symphony – Dean Dixon – November 13
71. The Tale of the Tobacco Auctioneer — Kenneth R. Williams – November 20
72. The Death of Aesop – February 13 and November 27
73. Joe Rainey vs. The Status Quo – Joseph Homer Rainey – December 4
1950 episodes
74. The Birth of a League – the Great Northern Migration and formation of the Chicago Urban League – January 15
75. Lawyer of Liberty – William Henry Huff – January 22
76. Portrait of Bill "Bojangles" Robinson – January 29
77. Housing: Chicago – February 5
78. Recorder of History – Dr. Carter G. Woodson, founded Negro History Week in Chicago – February 12
79. Brotherhood Week Begins at Home – February 19 – Tribute to Hugh C. McMannan
80. The Umfunddisi of Ndotsgeni – Todd Duncan – February 26
81. The Atlanta Thesis – E. Franklin Frazier – March 5
82. Premonition of the Panther – Sugar Ray Robinson – March 12
83. The Making of a Balladeer – Lonnie Johnson – March 19
84. The Liberators (Part I) – William Lloyd Garrison – March 26
85. The Liberators (Part II) – Wendell Phillips – April 2
86. The Buddy Young Story – April 9
87. The Fifth District Crime Fighter (Captain Kinzie Bleuitt) – a dramatization of law enforcement efforts in South Side, Chicago – April 16
88. The Dance Anthropologist – Katherine Dunham – April 23
89. The Case of Samuel Johnson – judge Jane Bolin – May 7
90. The Sorrow Songs – Spirituals – May 14 Durham won a Peabody Award for this performance in this episode.
91. John Hope, Educator – May 21
92. The Grave Diggers' Handicap – Isaac Murphy – June 4
93. The Shy Boy – Fats Waller – June 11
94. The Case of the Congressman's Train Ride – Richard Westbrooks, who represented Arthur Mitchell in a US Supreme Court case – June 18
95. The Angel of Federal Street – a tale about heaven and South Side, Chicago – nurse Ruth Blue Turnquist – June 25
96. Kansas City Phone Call – Nat King Cole – July 2
97. Mr. Jerico Adjusts a Claim – William Nickerson Jr. and the Golden State Mutual Life Insurance Company – July 9
98. Test by Fire – Charlotte Hawkins – July 16
99. Sing a Song for Children – Pruth McFarlin – July 23, rebroadcast in September 2002 on KGNU

== Post-Durham episodes – Paul Revere "Patriotic Freedom" format ==
- Patriotic Format – opening show for 1950, a discussion of freedom amongst historic figures – October 15, 1950
- United Nations – promoting the establishment of the organization – December 17, 1950
- Magic Words – a recap of the basic rights of freedom – November 5, 1951
- The Golden Circle – beginnings of the Knights of the Golden Circle – November 12, 1950
- Breakdown – an arrest (of Michael Shiftkoff) by the secret police in Communist Bulgaria – November 18, 1950
- The Price (Mackton and Winston of Company 'D') – a retelling of an American infantry unit's deployment to the Korean War – November 26, 1950
- Matthew Lyon – criticism of the Alien and Sedition Acts – December 10, 1950
- Weapons for Peace (United Nations) – illustrates the danger of world-wide nuclear war – December 17, 1950
- Peace on Earth (Frank Johnson Story) – a veteran's perspective on the end of a war – December 24, 1950
- John, Alma, Johnny and Myra – drama about the Occupation of the Baltic states – December 31, 1950
- The Capture – retells the story of Nathan Hale – January 7, 1951
- Dwight David Eisenhower – retells the story of his life up to his presidential election – January 14, 1951
- Freedom of Assembly (Jeff Maxwell Story) – review of the right – February 4, 1951
- Forced Confession – promotes Due Process of Law – February 18, 1951
- Anna Zenger – the first woman to publish a newspaper in America – February 25, 1951
- Benjamin Drake Story – drama about local people opposing unruly, oppressive people – March 4, 1951
- The Dick Draper Story – drama about employment rights in the United States – March 11, 1951
- Thomas Wright, American Citizen – About private efforts, including coercion, to thwart housing segregation in the United States – March 18, 1951
- Citizen Whitney – a dramatic criticism of Marxism and religion – March 25, 1951
- The Jones Family – a dramatization about eminent domain – April 8, 1951
- Fred Custer Story – a dramatization about attending college and medical school – April 15, 1951
- Reverend Browns Half Acre – concerns property ownership – April 22, 1951
- Korean Frontline – Stories about the Korean War and communism in China – April 29, 1951
- Harper College Story (The Test) – Discusses education – May 6, 1951
- Open for Business – the difficulties and rewards of owning a small retail business – May 13, 1951
- Judge Farwell's Story – reflections of a US Federal Judge – May 19, 1951
- Anna's Story – an immigrant from Sweden – January 21, 1951
- Russell Thomas Story: Coal Miner to Pharmacist – Illustrates the opportunity for advancement available in America – June 2, 1951
- Crisis in Avondale (The Avondale Story) – a drama about how free speech can be irresponsibly misused – June 9, 1951
- Mike Yankovich, Minnesota Miner (Decision) – a drama about the costs and benefits of unionization in mining – June 16, 1951
- Wanted, a Witness – a drama about the civic responsibility to assist in solving crimes – June 23, 1951
