= John Ferrugia =

American journalist

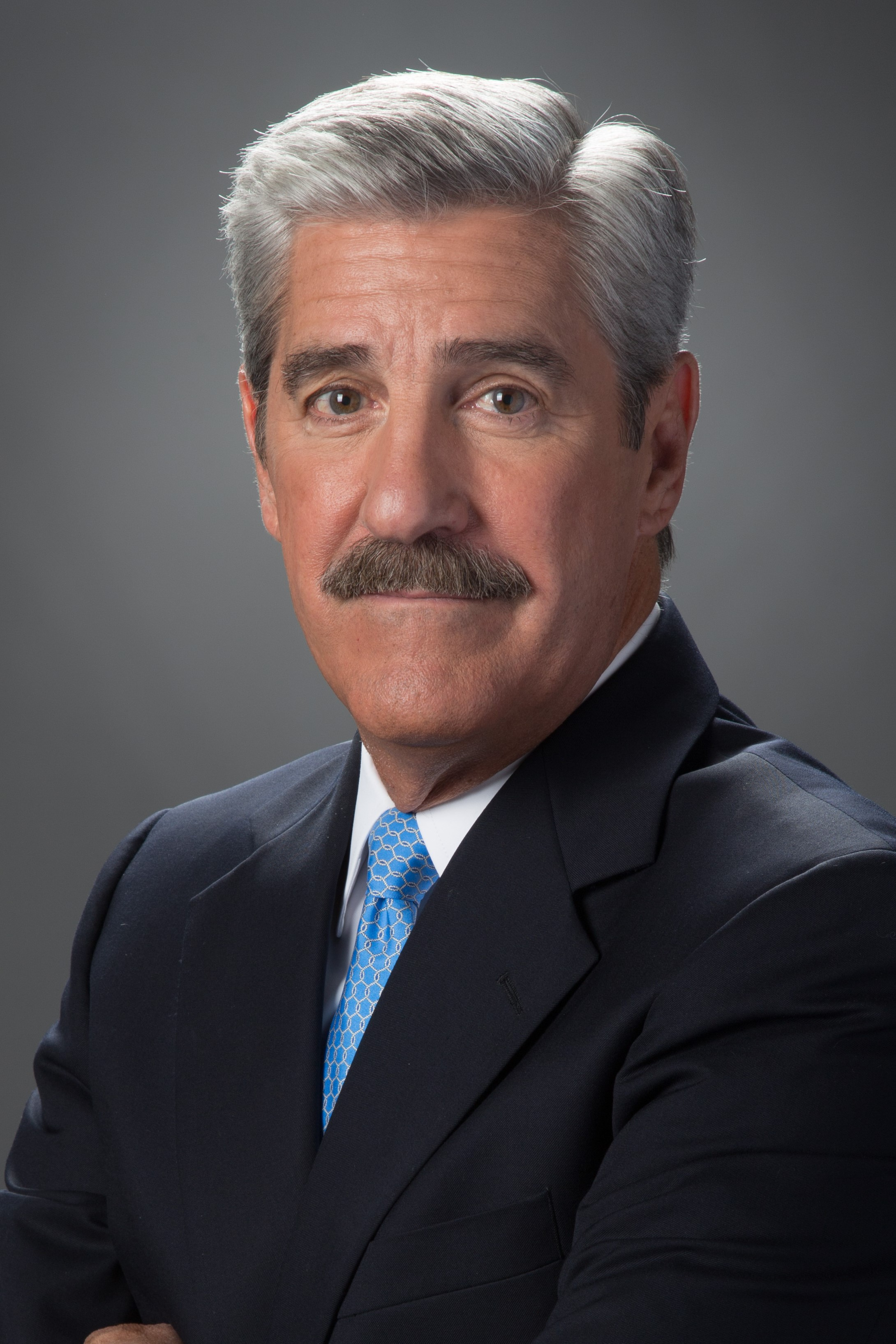
John Ferrugia

John Ferrugia (born 1951) is an investigative reporter who is currently working as a journalist/trainer for the non-profit Colorado News Collaborative (COLab). He is the former News Anchor and Managing Editor for Rocky Mountain PBS in Denver, Colorado. From 1992 through February 2016, he worked as an investigative reporter at KMGH-TV. He is a former CBS News correspondent. In the 1980s, he covered the White House, foreign and domestic assignments, and was a principal correspondent for the news magazine West 57th.

== Early life and education ==
Ferrugia grew up in Fulton, Missouri. He attended Catholic grade school (St. Peter's) and Fulton public high school. He served in the U.S. Naval Reserve (two years active duty in Europe) as a Navy journalist working for American Forces Radio and TV.

Ferrugia received a bachelor's degree in journalism from the University of Missouri School of Journalism in 1975.

== Personal ==
John Ferrugia has been married to his wife Mona since 1975. They have two children and live in Denver, Colorado.

== Professional career ==
After graduating from the University of Missouri School of Journalism in 1975, Ferrugia worked as a reporter/photojournalist at WTVT-TV in Tampa, Florida, where he was a member of a team (including producer Ray Blush and photojournalist-editor Jewell McGee) reporting and filming half-hour programs highlighting issues of public importance. He was later briefly the city hall reporter.

In 1977, Ferrugia moved to KCMO-TV in Kansas City, Missouri, where he established himself as a top investigative and political reporter. He received a Peabody Award in 1977 at age 26 for tracking flood damaged cars after a major flood in the Kansas City metro area. The results of his investigation were aired nationally on the CBS Evening News. He produced several other stories that aired on the "CBS Morning News". In 1980, he caught the eye of executives at CBS News, including Chicago bureau chief Jack Smith, and producer Joe Peyronnin during his coverage of the National Political Conventions.

In 1980, Ferrugia was hired by CBS News Washington Bureau Chief Ed Fouhy. He was assigned to cover important domestic and international stories including the inauguration of President Ronald Reagan; the assassination attempt of Reagan in March 1981 and subsequent investigation; the kidnapping of U.S. General James L. Dozier in Italy by the Red Brigades terrorist group; and the civil war in Lebanon.

In 1982, Ferrugia was assigned to the White House (replacing veteran correspondent Nelson Benton) working with correspondents Lesley Stahl, and Bill Plante. In addition to his reporting for the "CBS Morning News" and the daily "syndicated" stories from the White House for CBS affiliates, Ferrugia filed reports for CBS Radio and produced a nationally aired "First Line Report" from the White House each week.

In 1985, Ferrugia was named principal correspondent for the CBS news magazine West 57th (TV program). His colleagues included Meredith Vieira, Steve Kroft, and Bob Sirott. Ferrugia worked for Executive Producer Andrew Lack and Senior Producer Tom Yellin. He covered important national and international issues, including aspects of the Soviet war in Afghanistan, the Mafia trials in Sicily, CIA-sponsored propaganda in Pakistan, politics, and cutting edge cancer research in Japan. His investigative reports included medical fraud, inner city gangs, grey market prescription drugs, and the redesign of space shuttle rocket boosters after the Challenger disaster.

Ferrugia left CBS News in 1989 to anchor news and report for KCNC-TV in Denver, Colorado. In his first year, he was honored with a regional Emmy Award for his investigation of the funding of violent skinhead groups in Colorado. He also produced a number of stories focused on educating the public about HIV and AIDS.

Three years later he joined KMGH-TV where he initially anchored the midday news with co-anchor Anne Trujillo and continued to investigate issues of public policy. As the station's only investigative reporter, he initially worked alone. By 2002 KMGH-TV had hired investigative producer Jeff Harris and News Director Byron Grandy who, with Ferrugia, began to build the station's investigative reporting profile. The investigative team added producer Kurt Silver (now an FBI special agent), investigative reporter Tony Kovaleski, and producer Tom Burke. Jason Foster was the team's Photojournalist/Editor.

With Ferrugia as lead reporter, the team's investigation into sexual assaults of female cadets at the U.S. Air Force Academy in 2003 and 2004 prompted Congressional hearings; a complete change in leadership at one of the world's most prestigious military institutions; and new initiatives for protecting and caring for sexual assault victims in the military. The investigation won 4 major national journalism awards including the Alfred I. duPont–Columbia University Award, Peabody and the Investigative Reporters and Editors Award (IRE).

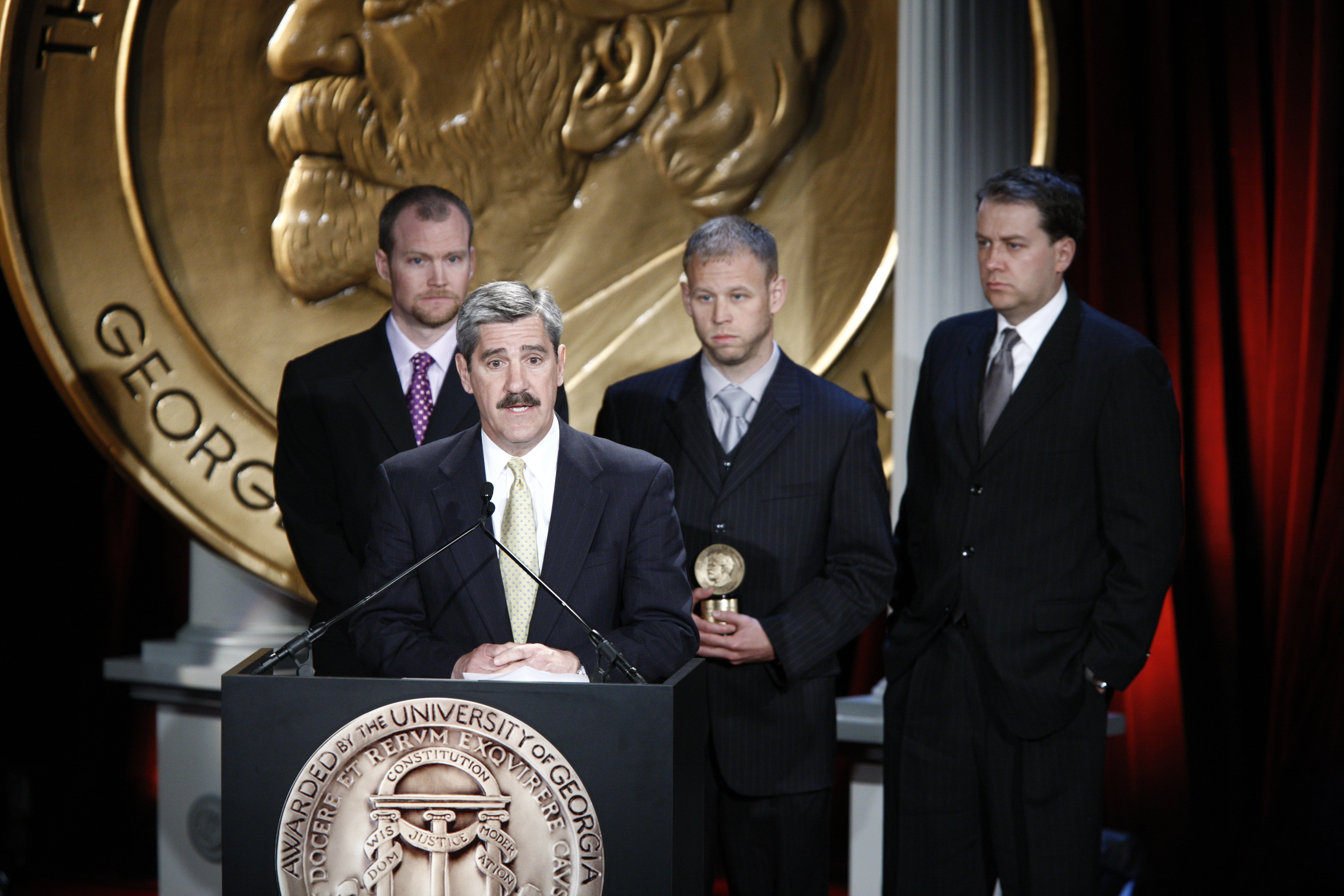
Tom Burke, John Ferrugia, Arthur Kane and Jason Foster at the 68th Annual Peabody Awards for Failing the Children

Ferrugia's was awarded a third Peabody for an investigation into the deaths of several children in Denver that lead to a statewide review of child welfare programs and restructuring of Denver's Department of Human Services to better protect children at risk. The investigative reports prompted Colorado's governor to appoint a child welfare committee that recommended sweeping changes in the state system including a new case worker academy where all county caseworkers are now trained to make sure all are accountable for their actions. The state also established the State Office of the Child Protection Ombudsman as an independent third party to investigate complaints.

Ferrugia's two-year investigation into deaths at the Colorado Mental Health Institute at Pueblo in 2010 prompted an outside third-party review of the forensic unit where patients died, the resignation of the hospital's director, and a criminal grand jury investigation. He and the team (Producers Arthur Kane and Tom Burke, and photojournalist Jason Foster) earned a 2011 national Edward R. Murrow Award for the series. The grand jury found the staff responsible for the death of a patient who was restrained face-down and suffocated. As a result of the death brought to light by the investigation, the Director of the Colorado Department of Human Services has banned the used of prone (face down) restraint in all CDHS funded facilities in Colorado and all contractors that receive public funding. The reports caused the resignation of the hospital's long time director; prompted major changes in state policies for dealing with the mentally ill in Colorado; and prompted the state legislature to add funding for 50 additional staff at the state's largest mental health facility.

In early 2016 Ferrugia moved to Rocky Mountain PBS in Denver to head an investigative team as anchor and managing editor.

In 2019, an RMPBS "Insight with John Ferrugia" investigation into unlimited access to firearms by mentally ill persons entitled “Imminent Danger” was honored with the Alfred I. duPont-Columbia University Awardfor public service journalism. Elements of the investigation were aired by the PBS Newshour and shown in a Colorado legislative hearing to explain why a law allowing temporary removal of firearms from the mentally ill is necessary. A so-called "red flag" bill was signed into Colorado law in 2019.

In early 2020 the Ferrugia lead the Insight team's investigation of Colorado's mental health system that was failing to provide emergency care and proper evaluation to thousands who needed services in the midst of a mental health crisis. The documentary detailed how law enforcement officers and the criminal justice system were often the only response to escalating mental health situations. In fact, the investigation showed that sometimes the only way a person in crisis could get services was to be arrested and ordered in for mental health treatment. The report used dramatic body camera footage from law enforcement agencies across Colorado, never before seen, to illustrate the thousands of annual encounters between mentally ill persons and local sheriffs and police. The footage showed both officers saving the lives of those in crisis and having to use deadly force to protect the lives of others. Elements of the program were aired nationally on PBS Newshour. The documentary, "Breakdown" was honored with a 2021 national Edward R. Murrow Award for best documentary.

The RMPBS team has also been honored with a national Gracie Award, a national Emmy nomination, regional and national Murrow awards, and multiple regional Emmy awards.

While his principal job is investigative reporting, Ferrugia has been involved in reporting major national stories for the past three decades, including the Columbine school killings and subsequent investigation; reporting from the courtroom of the Oklahoma City bombing trials; reporting from the floor of both the Democratic National Convention (DNC) and the Republican National Convention (RNC); producing and reporting a series on Homeland Security after the 2001 September 11 attacks including his first person reports of humanitarian aide, flying over Afghanistan following the U.S. invasion; and investigating the 2012 Aurora, Colorado shooting at a local theater.

Ferrugia was the only North American TV reporter to travel with Pope John Paul II on his 1993 trip to the Jamaica, Mexico, and Denver, Colorado for World Youth Day. He secured an exclusive interview with the Pontiff at the Pope's summer home outside Rome prior to the U.S. trip.

Ferrugia has been a contributing correspondent to ABC's 20/20 and Good Morning America; has contributed to several CNN broadcasts; and has appeared on Oprah.

He has been honored with television journalism's most prestigious awards including two (2) Alfred I. duPont–Columbia University Awards, three (3) Peabody Awards, a national Investigative Reporters and Editors (IRE) Award, the National Headliner Award, the Society of Professional Journalists (SPJ) Award, two (2) national Edward R. Murrow Award, and three (3) regional Edward R. Murrow awards. He has been honored with twenty-six (26) Regional Emmy Awards, awards from the Associated Press, Colorado Broadcasters Association, and Missouri Broadcasters Association. He has been honored with the Heartland NATAS Silver Circle Award for his contribution to journalism and in 2012, Ferrugia received the Missouri Honor Medal for Distinguished Service in Journalism from the Missouri School of Journalism at the University of Missouri. In 2025 Ferrugia was honored by the Heartland Emmy Awards as he was inducted into the Gold Circle for his 50 years of contribution to television as a TV journalist who has made "an indelible impact on our industry".

In March 2021, Ferrugia joined the non-profit Colorado News Collaborative - COLab - as a journalist/trainer. COLab's veteran reporters support local digital, print and broadcast news outlets, working with them on proprietary editorial projects as well as collaborative statewide projects. In addition, COLab provides reporter training and workshops.

Since 2023 Ferrugia has been an adjunct lecturer at the University of Colorado and the University of Missouri School of Journalism conducting seminars on news reporting and how to cultivate and retain news sources.

== Sources ==
- "TV REVIEW - 'WEST 57TH,' ON CBS - MAGAZINE HAS ITS DEBUT - NYTimes.com". nytimes.com.
- "Missouri Valley Special Collections : Item Viewer". localhistory.kclibrary.org. Archived from the original on 2014-08-19.
- "John Ferrugia Project 13". big13.net.
- "The New Kids on the Cbs Block Try to Put Their Show on the Map : People.com". people.com.
- "7NEWS Wins Peabody For Investigation Into Children's Deaths - 7NEWS Denver TheDenverChannel.com". thedenverchannel.com.
- "Today's Oprah Tackles AFA Sexual Assault Scandal - 7NEWS Denver TheDenverChannel.com". thedenverchannel.com.
- "John Ferrugia's Reporter's Notebook: Covering Columbine - 7NEWS Denver TheDenverChannel.com". thedenverchannel.com.
- "Fierce Entertainment". showbizdata.com.
- "KMGH wins second Peabody - The Denver Post". denverpost.com.
- "Rape Culture | On Point with Tom Ashbrook". onpointradio.org.
- Journalism.missouri.edu
- "J-School Legacy - Missouri School of Journalism". journalism.missouri.edu. Archived from the original on 2011-11-23.
- Academywomen.org
- "Heartland Emmys". Archived from the original on 2011-07-25.
- "Society of Professional Journalists News: SPJ Announces Recipients of 2003 Sigma Delta Chi Awards | Society of Professional Journalists | Improving and protecting journalism since 1909". spj.org.
- "The Peabody Awards | An International Competition for Electronic Media, honoring achievement in Television, Radio, Cable and the Web | Administered by University of Georgia's Grady College of Journalism and Mass Communication". Archived from the original on 2009-04-17.
- "The Peabody Awards | An International Competition for Electronic Media, honoring achievement in Television, Radio, Cable and the Web | Administered by University of Georgia's Grady College of Journalism and Mass Communication". Archived from the original on 2010-06-10.
- Ire.org
- Ire.org
- "CNN.com - Transcripts". transcripts.cnn.com.
- "Account Suspended". tvrundown.com.
- "CNN.com - Transcripts". studentnews.cnn.com. Archived from the original on 2014-08-19.
- "nationalheadlinerawards.com". nationalheadlinerawards.com. Archived from the original on 2009-06-13.
- "KMGH-TV, Denver: 'Failing the Children: Deadly Mistakes' - TVWeek - News". Archived from the original on 2012-04-05.
- Ire.org
- "KMGH: Colorado Dems Threaten to Block Clinton Delegate - ABC News". abcnews.go.com.
- "Young journalists can learn from Sarah Palin's mistakes - Columbia Missourian". columbiamissourian.com. Archived from the original on 2011-08-14.
- "Sisters dream big at small Sicilian winery - The Denver Post". denverpost.com.
- "John Ferrugia is journalist-trainer for COLab - COLab". colabnews.co.
- "John Ferrugia Gold Circle". Heartland Emmy.
