= WFLD =

Television station in Chicago

- Chicago, Illinois; United States
- Channels: Digital: 24 (UHF), shared with WPWR-TV; Virtual: 32
- Branding: Fox 32 Chicago; Fox Chicago (alternate); Fox 32 News

Programming
- Affiliations: 32.1: Fox; for others, see § Subchannels

Ownership
- Owner: Fox Television Stations, LLC
- Sister stations: WPWR-TV

History
- First air date: January 4, 1966
- Former channel numbers: Analog: 32 (UHF, 1966–2009); Digital: 31 (UHF, 1999–2019)
- Former affiliations: Independent (1966–1986); CBS (secondary, 1967–1970)
- Call sign meaning: Field Enterprises (founding owner)

Technical information
- Licensing authority: FCC
- Facility ID: 22211
- ERP: 435.5 kW (STA); 1,000 kW (CP)
- HAAT: 509.5 m (1,672 ft) (STA); 520 m (1,706 ft) (CP)
- Transmitter coordinates: 41°52′44.1″N 87°38′10.2″W

Links
- Public license information: Public file; LMS
- Website: www.fox32chicago.com

WFLD (channel 32) is a television station in Chicago, Illinois, United States. It is owned and operated by the Fox network through its Fox Television Stations division alongside WPWR-TV (channel 50), an independent station with MyNetworkTV. The two stations share studios on North Michigan Avenue in the Chicago Loop, and transmitter facilities atop the Willis Tower.

== History ==
=== As an independent station (1966–1986) ===
==== Field Communications ownership ====
WFLD first signed on the air on January 4, 1966, as an independent station. It was founded by a joint venture of the parties that each competed individually for the license and construction permit to operate on UHF channel 32. Field Enterprises—owned by heirs of the Marshall Field's department store chain, and publishers of the Chicago Sun-Times and the Chicago Daily News—was the station's majority partner (with a 50% interest) and was responsible for managing WFLD's day-to-day operations; they were led by veteran broadcasting executive Sterling C. (Red) Quinlan. The station originally operated from studio facilities located within the Marina City complex on State Street. Channel 32 was christened the "Station of Tomorrow" by an April 1966 Sun-Times article because of its innovative technical developments in broadcasting its signal. It also broadcast news programming from the Sun-Times/Daily News newsroom. From the fall of 1967 to summer of 1970, WFLD aired the final hour of CBS' Saturday daytime schedule from noon to 1 p.m., in lieu of the network's owned-and-operated station WBBM-TV (channel 2).

In March 1969, Field entered into an agreement to sell WFLD to New York City-based Metromedia for $10 million. At the time, the Field interests were concerned about running afoul of the Federal Communications Commission (FCC)'s recent scrutiny of commonly owned multiple media outlets within the same market. The deal ultimately fell through nearly one year later in February 1970; following the collapse of the Metromedia purchase attempt, Field instead purchased the 50% share of WFLD that was held by its minority partners.

WFLD was noteworthy for being the longtime home of the local B-movie program Svengoolie. There were two versions of the showcase: the original incarnation of the series began on the station on September 18, 1970, under the title Screaming Yellow Theatre, with local disc jockey Jerry G. Bishop doing scary voices and later wearing a long green wig while portraying the character. Bishop became such a hit with viewers that the show was popularly called "Svengoolie" after his character (although the title of the program did not change), and this version lasted until late in the summer of 1973. The second version premiered on June 16, 1979, with Rich Koz as "Son of Svengoolie", and ran on channel 32 until January 25, 1986. The show was revived on WCIU-TV (channel 26) when it became an English-language independent station in December 1994, and has aired there locally ever since, and began to be broadcast nationally on MeTV in April 2011. WFLD also showed two more horror movie showcases, Monstrous Movie and Chiller Theatre, that both aired before Svengoolie.

Field Enterprises sold controlling interest in WFLD to Kaiser Broadcasting in May 1972. When the deal was completed in July 1973, the two companies' new partnership resulted in WFLD joining Kaiser's stable of UHF independent stations—KBHK-TV in San Francisco, WKBG-TV in Boston, WKBS-TV in Philadelphia, WKBF-TV in Cleveland, and WKBD-TV in Detroit. In June 1977, Kaiser ended the partnership when it sold its share of the stations back to Field Enterprises. In addition to carrying the traditional fare of sitcoms, drama series, children's programs and first-run syndicated programs, the station also aired movies—initially European releases that were dubbed into English—and local public affairs programming during this period.

To counterprogram against its more established VHF rivals, channel 32 offered older cartoons, older off-network sitcoms, documentaries, drama series, westerns and live sporting events, although it easily trailed its biggest competitor, WGN-TV (channel 9), in the ratings among Chicago's independent stations. The station broadcast daily from 10 a.m. to about 1 a.m. during the 1970s, except from September to December, when the station signed on at 7 a.m. Beginning in 1978, WFLD signed on daily before 6 a.m. In 1975, WFLD acquired the local syndication rights to The Brady Bunch and The Partridge Family; two years later, in 1977, the station won the rights to a stronger slate of cartoons such as Woody Woodpecker, Tom and Jerry, Popeye and The Flintstones.

Channel 32 strengthened its syndicated programming slate in 1979, when it acquired the local syndication rights to M*A*S*H, All in the Family, Happy Days and What's Happening!!. The station also acquired the rights to I Love Lucy that year, and later added Battlestar Galactica, Buck Rogers in the 25th Century, The Six Million Dollar Man, Wonder Woman and Star Trek in 1982. WFLD began to beat WGN-TV in ratings as a result of its stronger programming acquisitions, and the two stations continued to go head-to-head throughout the 1980s. WFLD scored no big ticket program acquisitions in 1980 or 1981; however, in 1982, the station won the local syndication rights to popular series such as Three's Company, Taxi and Mork and Mindy.

Beginning in 1981, WFLD began overnight broadcasts of an in-vision teletext service, Nite-Owl, created by and intended to promote the Keyfax service that was at the time being transmitted through WFLD's vertical blanking interval (VBI); Keyfax was partially owned by Field Enterprises. Broadcasts of the service ceased after some time as Keyfax attempted to reposition itself as a two-way information service akin to Prestel or Viewtron; the service was discontinued completely by the end of 1986.

==== Sale to Metromedia ====
In 1982, Field Enterprises began a sale of its five television stations on an individual basis—a process which continued into the following year—due to disagreements between brothers Marshall Field V and Frederick "Ted" Field on how to operate the company, which strained their working relationship. Incidentally, the year prior in 1981, the Field brothers sought a prospective buyer for WFLD if the company would be put up for sale. While WFLD was the leading independent station in Chicago at the time, most of the companies that were interested in buying WFLD were only willing to pay about half the amount that Field wanted for the station (at least $100 million, compared to the approximately $50 million that the most expensive UHF stations went for). In addition, most of the prospective companies were concerned that Tribune Broadcasting-owned WGN-TV could eventually overtake WFLD again in the local ratings. By mere coincidence given Field's previous aborted attempt to sell channel 32 to that group, the one company that showed interest in WFLD was Metromedia, owners of WNEW-TV in New York City, which led the independent stations in that market and beat Tribune-owned WPIX in the ratings there.

Metromedia was ripe to compete against WGN, based on the group's success in competing against WPIX in the New York City market. In Chicago, Metromedia was given the right of first refusal to purchase WFLD. When Field began selling its stations, the company sold WFLD to Metromedia again—this time in a successfully completed deal for slightly over $100 million, a record price for a UHF station at the time. WFLD was the first of the stations that Field Communications sold when it began the liquidation process in September 1982 (with the final station to be sold—WKBD-TV in Detroit in January 1984) completing the deal for WFLD in March 1983. As a condition, Metromedia was forced by the FCC to divest radio station WMET (95.5 FM, now WCHI-FM), which it sold to Doubleday Broadcasting.

WFLD's programming slate changed slightly, but the station's on-air graphics and branding were abruptly changed to reflect the new ownership, with the station adopting "Metromedia 32" as its on-air brand (using a similar branding scheme that was used at new sister station WNEW-TV). Still, the old Field-era logos were used on-air by accident on some occasions through the summer of 1983. Metromedia added several first-run syndicated programs that were not previously carried in the Chicago market—as the market had only two commercial independent stations at the time as WSNS-TV (channel 44, now a Telemundo owned-and-operated station) became a full-time affiliate of the ONTV subscription service the previous year—onto the station's schedule, particularly in prime time, like The Merv Griffin Show (which WFLD previously carried a few years prior, but subsequently moved to WSNS where it ran until that station became a full-time ONTV outlet). WFLD remained the top-rated independent station in Chicago throughout Metromedia's ownership of the station.

=== As a Fox owned-and-operated station (1986–present) ===
In May 1985, Metromedia reached an agreement to sell WFLD-TV and its five sister independent stations—WNEW-TV in New York City, KTTV in Los Angeles, WTTG in Washington, D.C., KRLD-TV in Dallas–Fort Worth and KRIV in Houston—to News Corporation, owned by Australian newspaper magnate Rupert Murdoch, for $2.55 billion (ABC affiliate WCVB-TV in Boston, the company's only network-affiliated station, was originally to be sold as well through the deal, but upon exercising a right of first refusal clause related to Metromedia's 1982 purchase of that station, it was spun off to the Hearst Corporation's television and radio station subsidiary, Hearst Broadcasting, for $450 million in a separate, concurrent deal).

That October, News Corporation—which had purchased a 50% interest in 20th Century Fox corporate parent TCF Holdings for $250 million in March 1985—announced its intentions to create a fourth television network that would use the resources of 20th Century Fox Television to both produce and distribute programming, intending to compete with ABC, CBS and NBC. The company formally announced the launch of the new network, the Fox Broadcasting Company, on May 7, 1986, with the former Metromedia stations serving as its nuclei. The purchase of the Metromedia stations was approved by the FCC and finalized on March 6, 1986, with News Corporation creating a new broadcasting unit, the Fox Television Stations, to oversee the six television stations in April 1986.

Consequently, through the purchase, WFLD became one of the charter owned-and-operated stations of the Fox Broadcasting Company when the network launched seven months later on October 9. Following the sale to Fox, the station—which began branding on-air as "Fox 32"—continued to compete aggressively in the market, acquiring off-network syndicated programs such as Family Ties and The Cosby Show for its schedule. The station also migrated its operations into its current facility at 205 North Michigan Avenue in 1986, while also expanding its news presence with the launch of its news department in August 1987. The station's continued to carry its cartoon block on weekday afternoons, and top-rated off-network sitcoms in the evening hours; it also added more first-run talk and court shows.

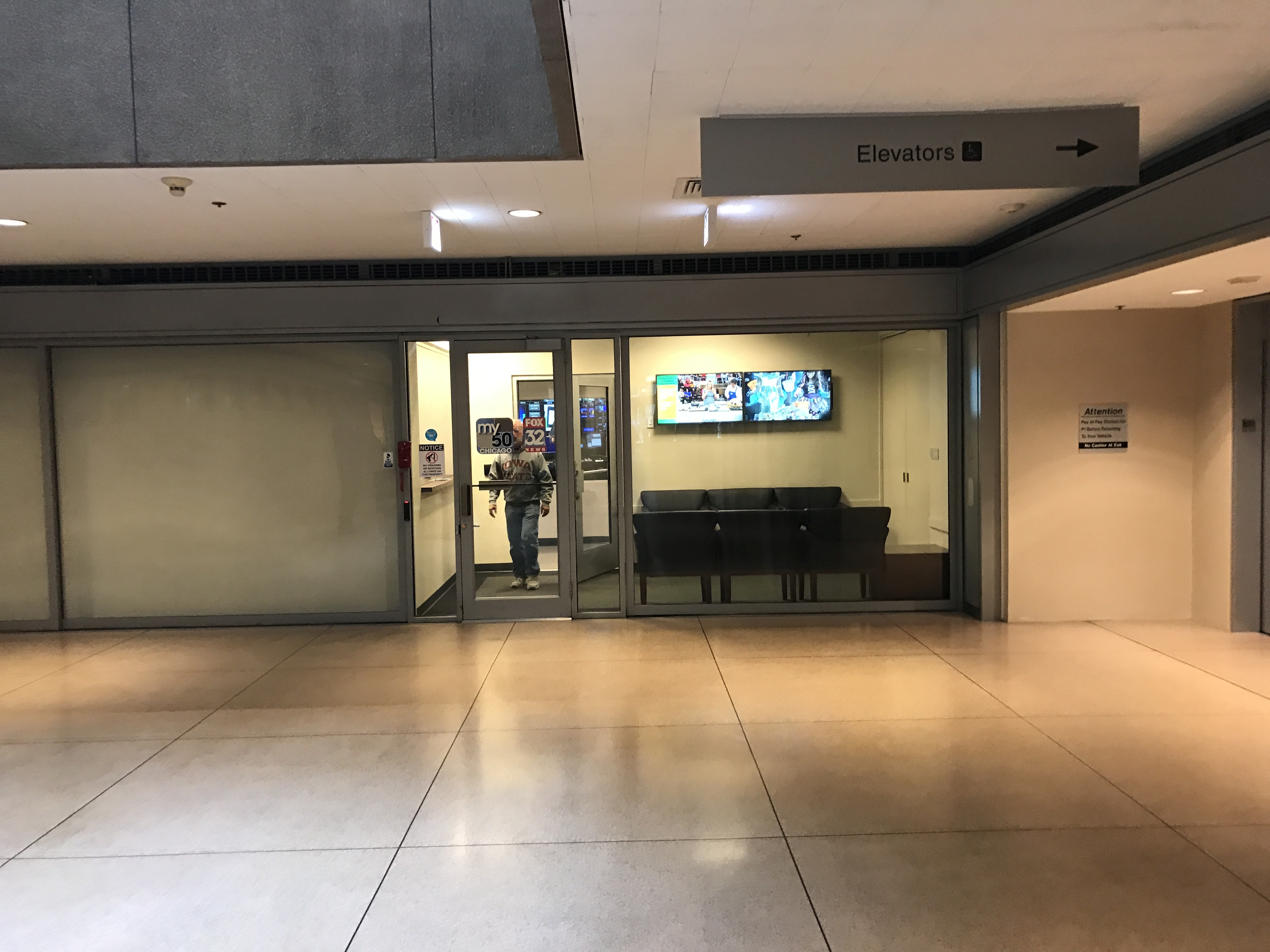
The main entrance to the studios of WFLD & WPWR on the ground floor of Michigan Plaza.

Although it was now part of a network, as was the case with other Fox stations during the network's early years, Channel 32, for all intents and purposes, continued to be programmed as a de facto independent station as Fox's initial programming consisted solely of a late-night talk show, The Late Show Starring Joan Rivers. Even when Fox launched its prime time lineup in April 1987, the network only aired programs during that daypart on Saturday and Sundays early on; Fox gradually debuted additional nights of programming over the next six years until it adopted a seven-night-a-week schedule in September 1993. Until Fox began airing programming on a nightly basis, WFLD aired a movie at 7 p.m. (initially at 8 p.m. until 1988) on nights when network programs did not air. The afternoon and Saturday morning animation blocks were replaced by the network-supplied Fox Children's Network block (later known as Fox Kids) in September 1990. During the mid-1990s, WFLD continued to strengthen its programming schedule with acquisitions such as The Simpsons, Home Improvement (which later moved to rival station WGN-TV in September 2001), and Seinfeld (which eventually moved to sister station WPWR, and later to WCIU-TV).

In 1997, after several years of being known on the air as "Fox 32" (although it began to visually de-emphasize references to channel 32 on-air in 1993), the station changed its on-air branding to "Fox Chicago". This was due to the perceived embarrassment of being on a UHF analog channel in the third-largest market in the United States, especially considering that The WB was carried on VHF station WGN-TV. For much of this period, WFLD was the only Fox owned-and-operated station that did not use the conventional "Fox (channel number)" branding standardization, even though most Chicagoans still referred to WFLD as "Fox 32" or "channel 32" (WFLD's Philadelphia sister station WTXF-TV utilized this same practice for nine years after Fox purchased that station from the Paramount Stations Group in 1994).

In June 2002, Fox Television Stations purchased UPN affiliate WPWR-TV from Newsweb Corporation for $450 million; the deal created a duopoly with WFLD when it was finalized on August 21 of that year, with WPWR's operations subsequently being integrated into WFLD's facilities in downtown Chicago. When Fox ended the weekday editions of the Fox Kids block in January 2002, WFLD added more first-run reality and talk shows to its lineup. In January 2003, WFLD dropped the Fox Saturday morning cartoon block, by then outsourced by Fox to producer 4Kids Entertainment and subsequently rebranded 4Kids TV, which was moved to WPWR—where that station aired the Saturday block in the same timeslot until Fox discontinued 4Kids TV on December 27, 2008. WFLD was the first of Fox's six original owned-and-operated stations (that were owned prior to its purchase of the New World Communications stations) to drop Fox's Saturday children's programming, and one of the few non-New World Fox O&Os (the other being sister station KMSP-TV in Minneapolis) that currently does not run the Weekend Marketplace infomercial block, which airs on WPWR instead.

In September 2006, WFLD relaunched its website, migrating it to the "MyFox" platform that was also rolled out to the other Fox-owned stations. The MyFox sites were refreshed in 2009 using a new platform developed by Fox and LIN Media (spun off as EndPlay, which Fox owned an equity interest in). In April 2012, WorldNow began to operate the websites for Fox's O&Os. On November 12, 2012, the station dropped the "Fox Chicago" branding after 15 years, and began branding as "Fox 32" full-time for the first time since 1993.

On December 14, 2017, The Walt Disney Company, owner of ABC's owned-and-operated station WLS-TV (channel 7), announced its intent to buy WFLD's parent company, 21st Century Fox, for $66.1 billion; the sale, which closed on March 20, 2019, excluded WFLD and sister station WPWR-TV as well as the Fox network, the MyNetworkTV programming service, Fox News, Fox Sports 1, the Big Ten Network and the Fox Television Stations unit, which were all transferred to a new company called Fox Corporation.

== Programming ==
=== Sports programming ===
WFLD acquired the rights to broadcast Major League Baseball games from the Chicago White Sox in 1968, assuming the contract from WGN-TV. Under the initial deal, WFLD carried White Sox games until 1972, when the team returned to WGN through a joint arrangement with WSNS-TV that lasted through the 1980 season and exclusively during the 1981 season; WFLD reassumed Sox game rights in 1982, carrying most of the team's non-cable games. In October 1988, the station filed a lawsuit against the White Sox club to terminate its television contract with the team, which was set to last through 1991, accusing team owners Jerry Reinsdorf and Eddie Einhorn of "gutting and stripmining the[...] team of salary investment, player quality and fan goodwill" which resulted in a decline in viewership for the games and profit losses for the station on the contract (WFLD's profits from the telecasts slid from $1.5 million profit in 1985 to a loss of $1.4 million in 1988, resulting in the rights fees costing four times more than the accrued revenue; ratings during that three-year period also dropped from a 5.1 share in 1985 to a 1.7 in August 1988) as well as breached advertising agreements with the Chicagoland Dodge Dealers consortium. Following an out-of-court settlement between WFLD station management and the Sox, on September 14, 1989, the White Sox announced that it would move its local television broadcasts back to WGN-TV beginning with the 1990 season.

Since the network established its sports division in 1994, most sports events carried on channel 32 have been provided through Fox Sports. Through Fox's coverage of Major League Baseball, WFLD has televised two of the three World Series with Chicago teams which have occurred in the television era: the White Sox in 2005 and the Cubs in 2016, both ending in series victories for each team and ending lengthy droughts pre-dating even the Golden Age of Radio.

From 1985 to 1989, WFLD also aired NBA games featuring the Chicago Bulls. Through the same agreement that resulted in that station obtaining the White Sox rights, WGN-TV acquired broadcast rights to the Bulls as Reinsdorf (a Chicago-area attorney and real estate investor) owns both franchises.

Through Fox's primary rights to the National Football Conference (NFC), the station has aired most Chicago Bears games since the network acquired partial television rights to the National Football League (NFL) in 1994. On April 22, 2008, the Bears announced a deal with WFLD to become its official broadcast partner. Consequently, in addition to already carrying most regular season and select preseason games through Fox, it began airing preseason games through the team's syndication service as well as other Bears-related programming during the NFL season including the pre-game and post-game shows Bears Gameday Live (on Sunday mornings) and Bears GameNight Live (which follows The Final Word on Sunday evenings). Other team-related programs were added through the deal including WFLD-produced secondary pre-game show Fox Kickoff Sunday (which debuted in 2010; not to be confused with Fox NFL Kickoff, which due to Bears Gameday Live, airs on WPWR instead) and the feature/interview program Inside the Bears (which debuted in 2013). On October 17, 2017, WFLD announced that it had renewed its Bears rights through the 2022 season. Since 2018, WFLD has, through Fox, then through Amazon Prime Video, also aired any Bears games that are part of the Thursday Night Football package. Per its agreement with the Bears, the team's preseason contests take priority over other programming, even leading a Cubs game picked up by Fox for its Baseball Night in America package to air on WPWR.

=== News operation ===
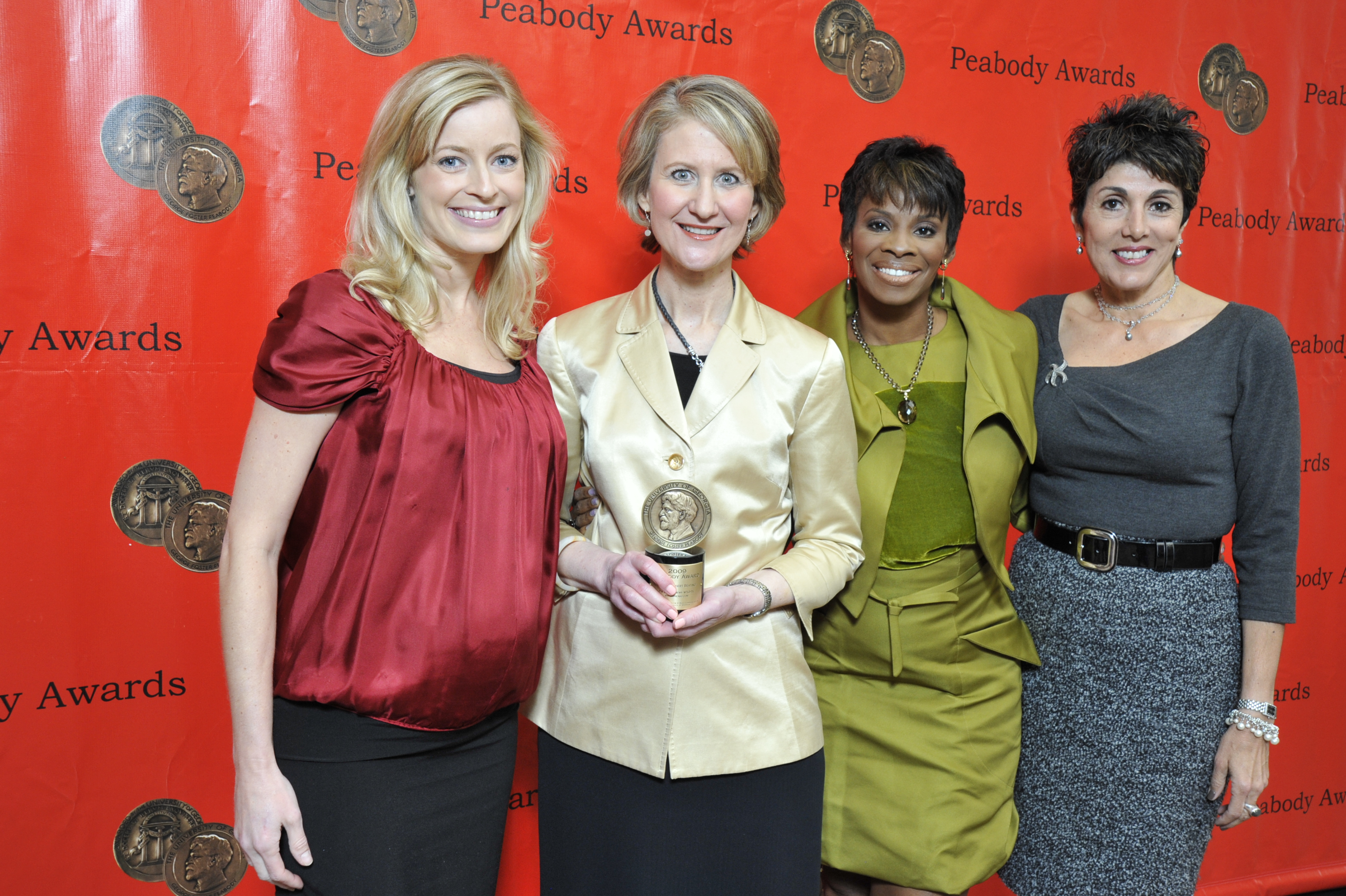
WFLD news staff at the 69th Annual Peabody Awards in 2010, at which the station's news department won for its reporting on the beating death of Derrion Albert.

WFLD presently broadcasts 67 1/2 hours of locally produced newscasts each week (with 12 hours each weekday, 3 1/2 hours on Saturdays and four hours on Sundays); in regards to the number of hours devoted to locally produced news programming, it is the second-highest news programming output of any station in the Chicago market, behind WGN-TV (which runs 70 1/2 hours of newscasts each week). Unlike most Fox affiliates in large markets, WFLD does not seem to carry evening newscasts on weekends.

==== News department history ====
During much of its history under the ownership of Field Enterprises, WFLD's news programming consisted solely of 90-second news updates, branded as Newscope (later renamed Newscene in 1979), that aired during the station's daytime and evening programming; a 10 p.m. edition of the program consisted of five- to ten-minute locally produced inserts that served as a lead-out of the station's weeknight prime time movie presentations. During the overnight hours, the station also provided the Keyfax Nite-Owl teletext service, which provided news, weather, sports and entertainment stories fed by computer systems at the Chicago Sun-Times offices with data sent over a telephone line from an editorial office in Elk Grove Village. After Nite Owl was discontinued in 1982, WFLD began airing an hour-long simulcast of CNN Headline News during the overnight hours, as well as in the early afternoon on weekdays. Newscope was canceled in 1982, shortly after Metromedia finalized its acquisition of the station.

Metromedia canceled the Newscope updates at least in part because of plans for a full-fledged news department for the station. At the time, Metromedia was also launching news operations at their Dallas and Houston stations as part of a news initiative centered around an hour-long, hybrid national/local newscast. While the Dallas and Houston operations launched under Metromedia ownership, the planned news department for WFLD did not come to fruition, and neither did the planned national newscast.

Following the announcement that it would move the station to a new studio facility on Michigan Avenue, Fox Television Stations created an in-house news department for WFLD. The station debuted its first long-form newscasts on August 3, 1987, with the premiere of half-hour newscasts at 7 p.m. (touted as "the news that doesn't get home before you do") and 11 p.m., which aired Monday through Friday evenings; this was followed by the addition of half-hour 9 p.m. weekend editions on August 29. Originally anchored by Kris Long and Robin Robinson Brantley (the latter of whom remained the station's lead anchor until November 2013), the two programs aired separately for a year until both newscasts were consolidated into a single half-hour program to compete with the 9 p.m. newscast on then-independent station WGN-TV in November 1987, at which time the weekend editions were also canceled due to low ratings. The early newscast was moved back to 7 p.m. by the fall of 1988, and returned to 9 p.m. by the fall of 1989, in anticipation of Fox's expanding prime time schedule.

In September 1990, WFLD announced plans to launch a 24-hour local cable news channel, to have been named "Chicago Cable News", in conjunction with former WLS-TV and WMAQ-TV weathercaster John Coleman (who was tapped to serve as the channel's general manager) and local cable provider Tele-Communications Inc. (which sold its Chicago area systems to Comcast in 1999), for a tentative launch in January 1991. Although Chicago Cable News would have shared some video footage with WFLD, the channel planned to employ anchors and reporters separate from those seen on channel 32's newscasts. This concept never launched; WGN-TV eventually launched a similar cable channel, Chicagoland Television (CLTV), in January 1993. In 1991, the station retitled its newscasts from Fox 32 News to Fox News Chicago (though it was largely referenced verbally as simply Fox News in report introductions and end tags).

WFLD's most consequential news hire came in April 1993 when it persuaded longtime WBBM-TV anchor Walter Jacobson to take over as lead anchor of channel 32's 9 p.m. newscast; he also began providing taped commentaries and hosted a viewer mail segment for Good Day Chicago during its first years. Jacobson remained a main co-anchor of the 9 p.m. newscast until 2004, when he was replaced by Mark Suppelsa; Jacobson stayed at WFLD as host of Fox Chicago Sunday and a commentator for the evening newscast until his retirement in 2006 (he subsequently came out of retirement to return to WBBM, where he remained until 2012). Largely due to Jacobson's influence, WFLD's newscasts have somewhat less of a tabloid feel than other Fox stations. However, they are much stylistically flashier than the Chicago market's other local television news programs.

WFLD programmed news outside its established 9 p.m. slot for the first time on June 28, 1993, when it premiered a weekday morning newscast, Good Day Chicago. First anchored by Marianne Murciano, Darryl Dennard and David Rose, and formatted as a mix of news, commentary and lifestyle features, the show originally aired for three hours from 6 to 9 a.m., replacing children's programming. In July 1999, WFLD launched a half-hour midday newscast at noon, while expanding its morning newscast – by that time, titled Fox Thing in the Morning – to four hours (starting at 5 a.m.).

On April 9, 2007, WFLD premiered a half-hour 10 p.m. newscast called The TEN, anchored by David Novarro and former WLS-TV and WBBM-TV anchor/reporter Lauren Cohn. The program (according to Robert Feder's April 18, 2007, column in the Chicago Sun-Times) beat CBS-owned WBBM-TV's 10 p.m. newscast on its second day on the air. Despite its early success against WBBM-TV, The TEN was overall never much of a factor in the ratings; towards the end of its run, it fell to a distant fifth behind established late-news competitors WBBM, WLS-TV and WMAQ-TV, and Family Guy reruns on WGN-TV. As a result, WFLD canceled the program, with its last broadcast airing on September 21, 2009.

On January 12, 2009, WFLD and NBC-owned WMAQ-TV entered into a Local News Service agreement to share a news helicopter and pool video footage between the two stations. On May 10, 2009, WFLD became the last news-producing English-language station in the market to begin broadcasting its newscasts in high definition; however, remote field footage continues to be broadcast in 16:9 widescreen standard definition.

On July 5, 2016, WFLD launched an hour-long, weekday-only newscast at 5 p.m, becoming the fifteenth Fox-owned station and the fifth television station in Chicago to air a late-afternoon newscast; the program competes against with half-hour early evening news programs on established competitors WBBM-TV, WMAQ-TV and WLS-TV and the second hour of WGN-TV's Evening News block.

On March 30, 2017, WFLD announced that it would expand the length of Good Day Chicago to six hours, with the addition of a half-hour to the start of the program at 4 a.m.; ironically, when the expansion took place on April 10, WFLD became the third station in Chicago to expand its morning newscast into that time period (following WGN-TV, which began its expansion into the 4 a.m. hour in July 2011 and WMAQ-TV, which launched a 4 a.m. newscast in August 2015).

==== Ratings ====
Historically, WFLD has been one of Fox's weakest owned-and-operated stations, particularly in regards to its newscasts. In recent Nielsen ratings sweeps periods, WFLD has been mired in last place among the late evening (9 or 10 p.m.) newscasts seen on the market's five English-language news-producing stations. As such, Chicago, prior to WGN's disaffiliation from that network in September 2016, was one of the few markets in the country where the Fox station actually trailed that market's CW-affiliated station (WGN-TV) in the local viewership ratings, from sign-on to sign-off. This is primarily due to WGN-TV's strong news department, local sports programming, and higher-rated syndicated programming, even though WFLD has a much stronger network lead-in.

In the February 2011 sweeps period, WFLD's 9 p.m. newscast slid to a 2.3 rating share, down more than a full point from a 3.4 during the February 2010 sweeps period. This is despite the pairing of co-anchor team Bob Sirott and Robin Robinson, suggesting that the pairing of the anchors has not been able to improve ratings. By February 2015, the 9 p.m. newscast — by then, anchored by Dawn Hasbrouck and Jeff Herndon — had dropped to a 0.9 share (a decline from a 1.3 in May 2014), behind the 1.6 share accrued by WGN-TV's 9 p.m. newscast.

==== Notable current on-air staff ====
- Sylvia Perez – anchor/general assignment reporter
- Roseanne Tellez – anchor/general assignment reporter

==== Notable former on-air staff ====
- Mike Barz
- Jerry G. Bishop
- Lauren Cohn
- Jack Conaty
- Anna Davlantes
- Maurice DuBois
- Jon Duncanson
- Amy Freeze
- Tamron Hall
- Jonathan Hoenig
- Bill Jackson
- Walter Jacobson
- Jan Jeffcoat
- Jon Kelley
- Tal Kopan
- Rich Koz
- Sarah Kustok
- Rick Leventhal
- Don Lemon
- Nancy Loo
- Corey McPherrin
- Brant Miller
- Johnny Morris
- Marianne Murciano
- David Novarro
- Anita Padilla
- Michael Pomeranz
- Robin Robinson
- Richard Roeper
- Bob Sirott
- Tammie Souza
- Mark Suppelsa
- Harry Volkman
- Tom Waddle
- Rafer Weigel
- Bruce Wolf

== Technical information ==
=== Subchannels ===
Subchannels of WFLD and WPWR-TV
License	Subchannel	Res.	Short name	Programming
WFLD	32.1	720p	WFLD-DT	Fox
WFLD	32.2	480i	Movies!	Movies!
WFLD	32.3	480i	Buzzr	Buzzr
WFLD	32.4	480i	ROAR	Roar
WFLD	32.5	480i	Fox WX	Fox Weather
WFLD	2.3	480i	DABL	Dabl (WBBM-TV)
WPWR-TV	50.1	720p	WPWR-DT	Main WPWR-TV programming

Broadcast on behalf of another station

=== Analog-to-digital conversion ===
WFLD ended regular programming on its analog signal, over UHF channel 32, at 11:59 p.m. on June 12, 2009, the official date on which full-power television stations in the United States transitioned from analog to digital broadcasts under federal mandate. The station's digital signal continued to broadcast on its pre-transition UHF channel 31, using virtual channel 32.

WFLD was the only television station in the Chicago market that participated in the "Analog Nightlight" program until its analog transmitter atop the John Hancock Center was shut down permanently on June 26, 2009. The station's transmitter was upgraded to operate at a radiated power of 1 megawatt—the maximum amount of power legally allowed for a broadcast television transmitter by the FCC—in early 2009.

On April 13, 2017, it was revealed that the over-the-air spectrum of sister station WPWR-TV was sold in the FCC's spectrum reallocation auction for $160.7 million. WPWR-TV began sharing broadcast spectrum with WFLD effective June 11, 2018.
