= WLS (AM) =

- Chicago, Illinois; United States
- Broadcast area: Chicago metropolitan area
- Frequency: 890 kHz
- Branding: The Big 89 WLS

Programming
- Format: Talk radio

Ownership
- Owner: Cumulus Media; (Radio License Holdings LLC)
- Sister stations: WKQX; WLS-FM

History
- First air date: April 11, 1924
- Former call signs: WES (1924)
- Former frequencies: 670 kHz (1924); 870 kHz (1924–1941)
- Call sign meaning: Founded by Sears, the "World's Largest Store"

Technical information
- Licensing authority: FCC
- Facility ID: 73227
- Class: A
- Power: 50,000 watts
- Transmitter coordinates: 41°33′21.12″N 87°50′54.19″W
- Repeater: 94.7 WLS-FM HD2 (Chicago)

Links
- Public license information: Public file; LMS
- Website: www.wlsam.com

WLS (890 kHz) is a commercial AM radio station in Chicago, Illinois. Owned by Cumulus Media, through licensee Radio License Holdings LLC, the station airs a talk radio format. WLS studios are in the NBC Tower on North Columbus Drive in the city's Streeterville neighborhood. The station's programming is also available in the Chicago metropolitan area via a simulcast on the HD2 digital subchannel of sister station WLS-FM. The station formerly broadcast in C-QUAM AM stereo.

Its transmitter site is located on the southwestern edge of Tinley Park, Illinois, in Will County. WLS is a Class A station broadcasting on the clear-channel frequency of 890 kHz with 50,000 watts, using a non-directional antenna fed by a Nautel NX-50 transmitter, with a Harris DX-50 serving as a backup transmitter. Both transmitters run in MDCL (Modulation Dependent Carrier Level) mode to improve efficiency. The station's daytime groundwave service contour covers portions of five states. At night, its signal routinely reaches 38 states via skywave.

WLS participates as an Emergency Alert System primary entry point, serving northern Illinois and western Indiana.

Founded in 1924 by Sears, Roebuck and Company—with the call sign an abbreviation for Sears' "World's Largest Store" slogan—WLS spent its early years as the radio outlet of the Prairie Farmer magazine. From 1928 until 1954, WLS shared their assigned frequency and overall broadcast operations with Blue Network-owned WENR until the Blue Network's successor, the American Broadcasting Company, merged WENR into WLS and eventually purchased it outright. The station's contemporary hit radio era from 1960 until 1989 saw WLS at a creative and ratings pinnacle headlined by personalities Dick Biondi, Larry Lujack, John Records Landecker and Bob Sirott. Since 1989, WLS has been a full-time talk radio outlet.

== Programming ==
Weekdays begin with a local news and interview program, The Ray Stevens Show. The rest of the weekday schedule is nationally syndicated conservative talk shows from co-owned Westwood One: The Chris Plante Show, The Vince Show with Vince Coglianese, The Guy Benson Show, The Mark Levin Show, Rich Valdes America at Night, Red Eye Radio and America in the Morning.

Weekends feature shows on money, health, real estate, technology, travel and cars. Syndicated weekend programs include The Kim Komando Show and The Larry Kudlow Show, as well as repeats of weekday shows. Some weekend hours are paid brokered programming. Most hours on nights and weekends begin with an update from Fox News Radio.

== History ==
=== Establishment by Sears ===
In the 1920s, Sears, Roebuck and Company was a major retail and mail order company. To get farmers and people in rural communities to buy radio sets from its catalogs, Sears initially bought time on radio stations. It later decided to establish its own station. Just before the permanent station was ready, Sears began broadcasts on March 21, 1924, as WBBX with noon programs using the WMAQ studios.

Sears broadcast test transmissions from its own studios on April 9, 10 and 11, 1924, using the call sign WES (for "World's Economy Store"). Sears originally operated its station at the company's corporate headquarters on Chicago's West Side, which is also where the company's mail order business was located. On April 12, 1924, the station commenced officially, using the call letters WLS (for "World's Largest Store"), and broadcasting from its new studios in the Sherman House Hotel in downtown Chicago. The station's transmitter was originally located outside Crete, Illinois. On April 19, the station aired its first National Barn Dance. Harriet Lee was a WLS staff singer as part of the Harmony Team in the late 1920s. The popular contralto singer also played "Aunt May" on the Children's Hour show.

The station shared time on the frequency with WCBD until the implementation of the Federal Radio Commission's General Order 40 on November 11, 1928, at which point WLS began sharing time as a "clear channel" station with WENR.

=== Prairie Farmer ownership ===
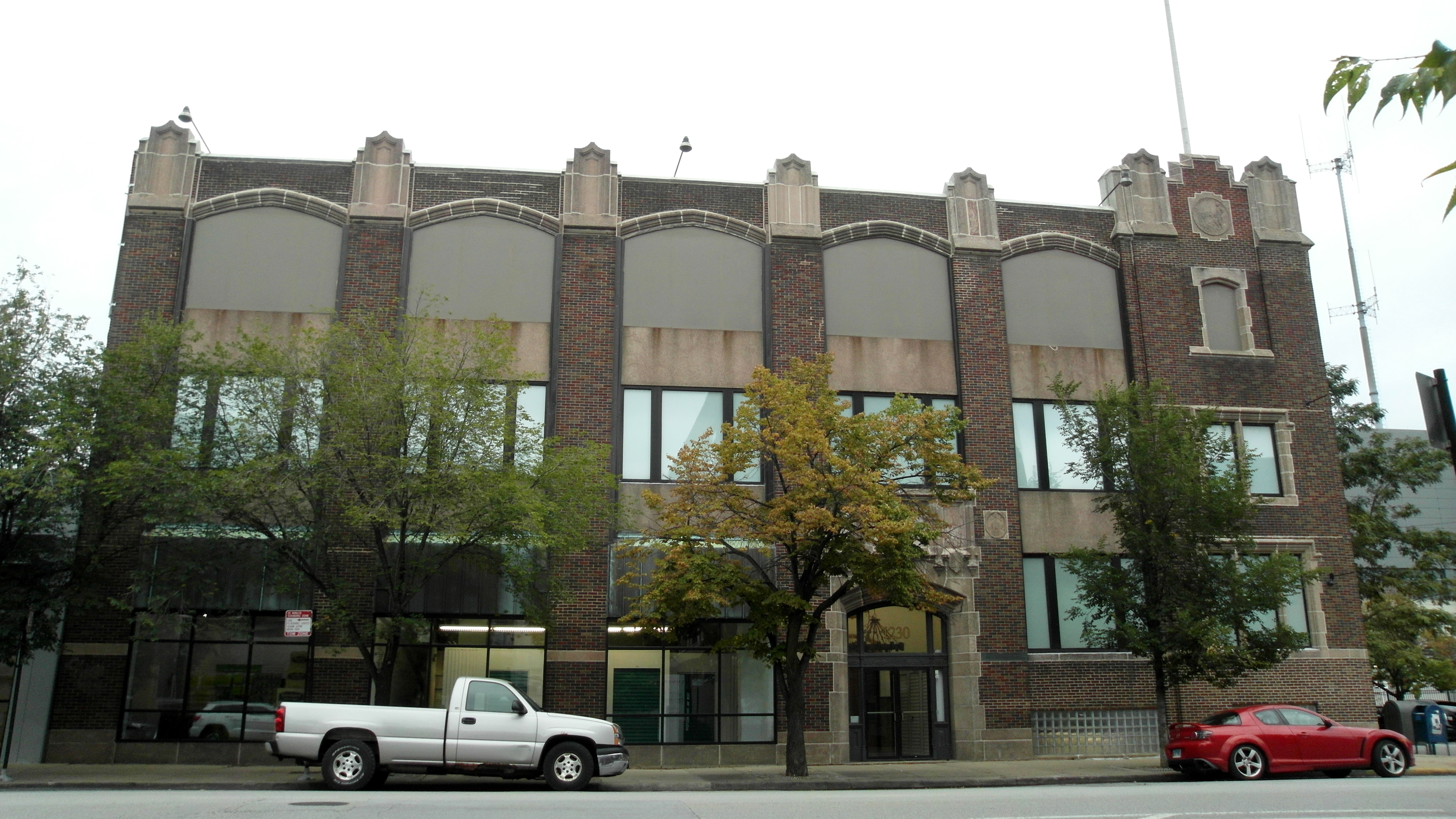
The Prairie Farmer Building, home to WLS's studios from 1930 to 1960.

Sears opened the station in 1924 as a service to farmers and subsequently sold it to the Prairie Farmer magazine in 1928. The station moved to the Prairie Farmer Building on West Washington in Chicago, where it remained for 32 years. It was the scene of the National Barn Dance, which featured Gene Autry, Pat Buttram, and George Gobel, and which was second only to the Grand Ole Opry (itself a local National Barn Dance spinoff) in presenting country music and humor.

The station also experimented successfully in many forms of news broadcasting, including weather and crop reports. Its most famous news broadcast was the eyewitness report of the Hindenburg disaster by Herbert Morrison. Morrison and engineer Charles Nehlsen had been sent to New Jersey by WLS to cover the arrival of the Hindenburg for delayed broadcast. Their recordings aired the next day on May 7, 1937, the first time that recordings of a news event were ever broadcast.

In the fall of 1937, the station was one of several Chicago radio stations to donate airtime to Chicago Public Schools for a pioneering program in which the school district provided elementary school students with distance education amid a polio outbreak-related school closure.

=== Blue Network affiliation ===
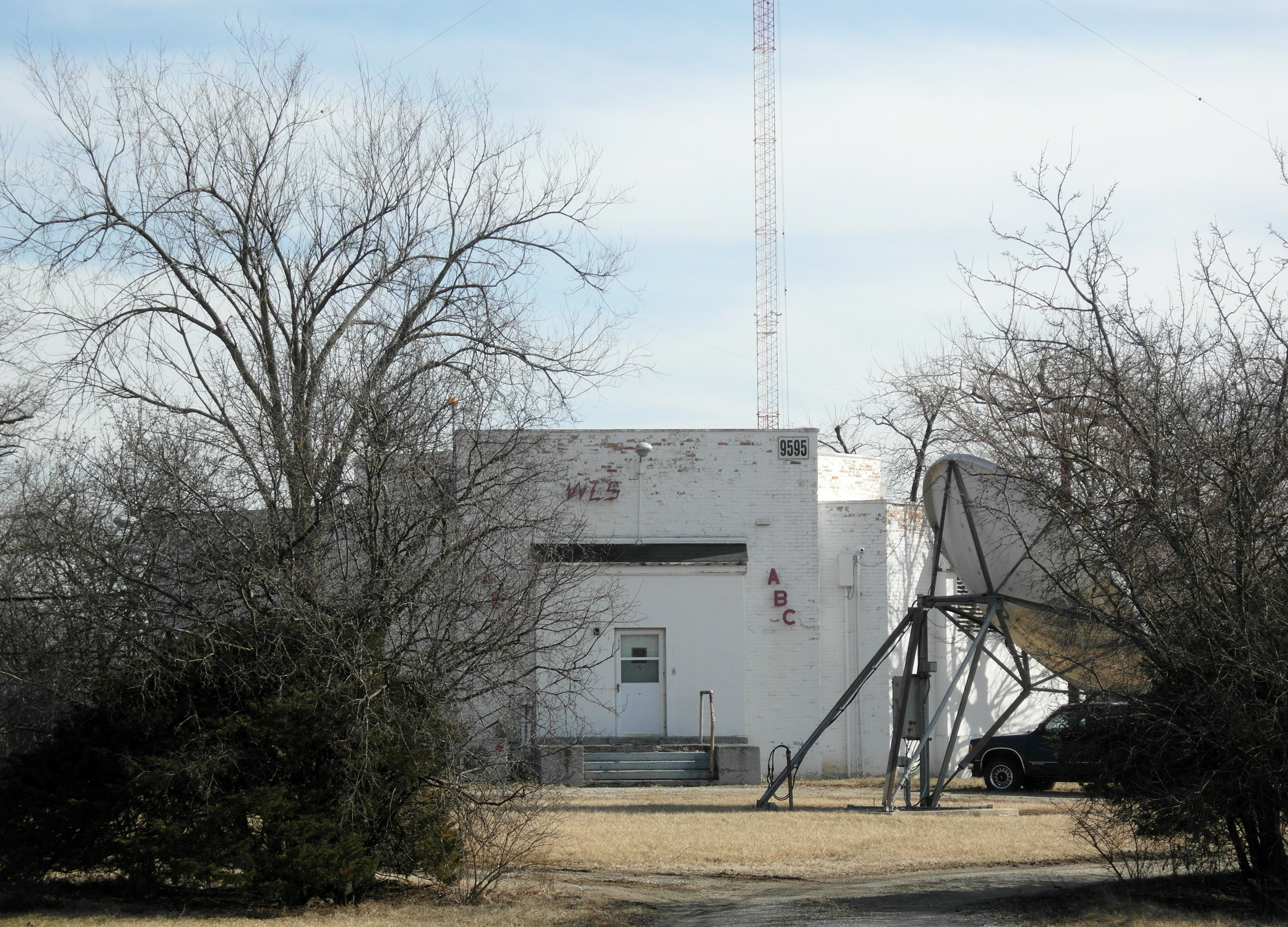
WLS's transmitter building in Tinley Park

Starting in the 1930s, WLS was an affiliate of the Blue Network of the National Broadcasting Company (NBC), and as such aired the popular Fibber McGee and Molly and Lum and Abner comedy programs (both produced at the studios of Chicago's NBC-owned stations, WENR and WMAQ) during their early years. When the Federal Communications Commission forced NBC to sell the Blue Network, WLS maintained its affiliation with the network under its new identity, the American Broadcasting Company (ABC). Under this affiliation, some programs from the network that were not commercially sponsored or which were scheduled to cross the time that WLS and WENR shifted its use of the same frequency (such as baseball or football games) were transferred to air on a third Blue Network/ABC affiliate in Chicago, WCFL. Blue/ABC network broadcasts of addresses by labor leaders were also shifted away from WLS and WENR to WCFL, which was owned at the time by the Chicago Federation of Labor.

In 1931, the station's power was increased from 5,000 watts to 50,000 watts, and the station began sharing the transmitter of WENR near Downers Grove, Illinois. In 1938, the station's transmitter was moved to Tinley Park, Illinois. Changes were made regarding AM frequencies in 1941 as a result of the North American Regional Broadcasting Agreement (NARBA); this moved WENR and WLS from 870 to 890 kHz.

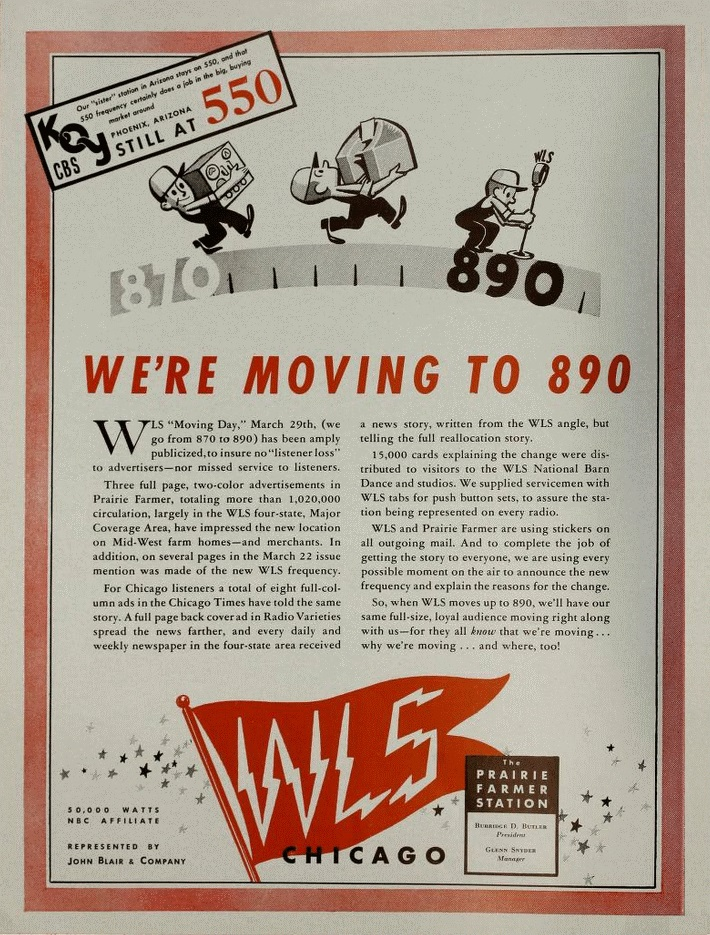
On March 29, 1941, WLS and WENR moved from 870 to 890 kHz, as part of the regional NARBA reassignments

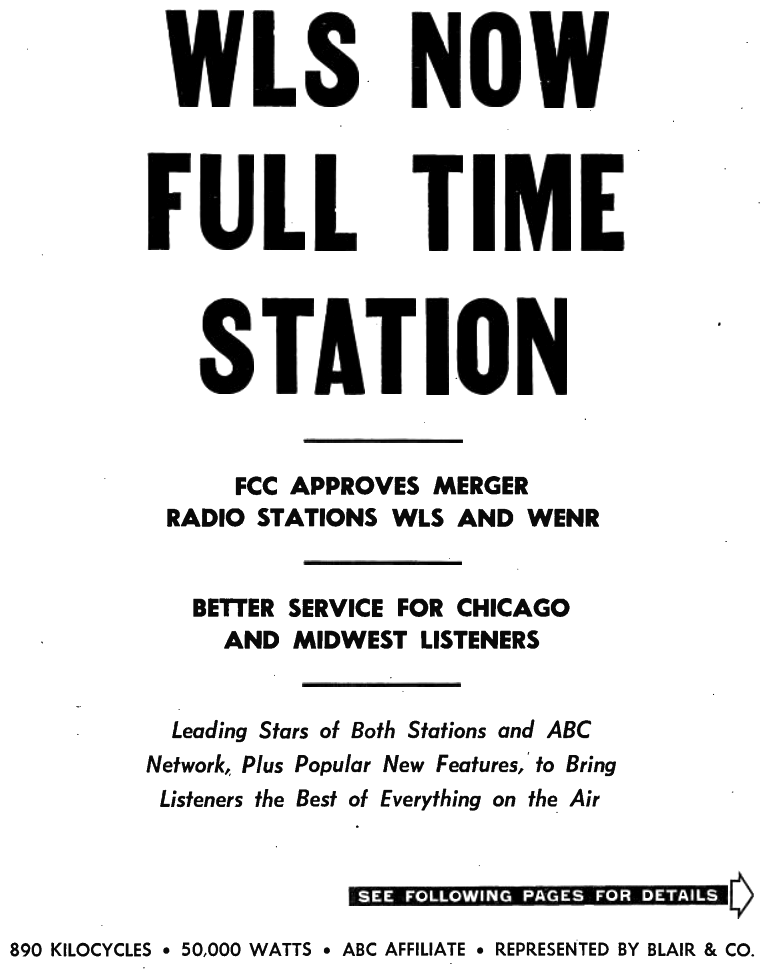
In 1954, WLS became a fulltime station, after the deletion of WENR.

=== ABC ownership ===
WENR and WLS shared their common frequency on a time-sharing arrangement until 1954, when ABC (then known as American Broadcasting-Paramount Theatres) bought a 50 percent interest in WLS and combined the stations under the WLS call sign. In November 1959, ABC announced its purchase of Prairie Farmer and its half of WLS, giving ABC full ownership of the station.

=== Musicradio era ===
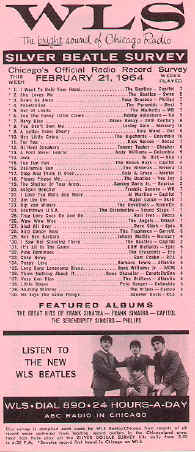
WLS weekly Silver Dollar Survey, distributed free via record stores, was retitled Silver Beatle Survey during the height of Beatlemania

On May 2, 1960, at 6 am, WLS went with a full-time Top 40 format. Mort Crowley was the first disc jockey under the new format, and the first song played was "Alley-Oop" by The Hollywood Argyles, four weeks before it debuted on the Hot 100. The station's jingles were sung by the Anita Kerr Singers; later on, the jingles were sung by PAMS Productions. For a few months after the format change, the "bright new sound" was broadcast from the Prairie Farmer Building. WLS did not make the move to downtown Michigan Avenue's Stone Container Building, located at 360 North Michigan Avenue, until October of that year.

Ralph Beaudin was the station's president and general manager, and oversaw the station's transformation into a Top 40 station. Sam Holman was the station's program director and an afternoon DJ. Beaudin and Holman were both brought in from KQV in Pittsburgh, Pennsylvania. Ed Grennan, an announcer on the station since 1959, was retained as a DJ under the new format. Star disc jockey Dick Biondi, a 1998 inductee into the National Radio Hall of Fame, was brought in from WEBR in Buffalo, New York. Biondi remained on the station until 1963. Other DJs who were brought in for the station's new format included Bob Hale from WIRL in Peoria, Illinois, Gene Taylor from WOKY in Milwaukee, Wisconsin, Mort Crowley from WADO in New York City, and Jim Dunbar from WDSU in New Orleans, Louisiana.

In October 1960, Art Roberts joined the station as a DJ, having previously worked at WKBW in Buffalo, New York. Clark Weber joined the station as a DJ, remaining with the station until 1969. In 1963, Ron "Ringo" Riley joined the station as a DJ, having previously worked at WHK in Cleveland, Ohio. Dex Card joined the station in 1964, and hosted the Silver Dollar Survey countdown until 1967, the longest of the show's hosts. In 1967, Larry Lujack joined WLS as a DJ, four months after he had started at the station's top competitor WCFL. Lujack returned to WCFL in 1972, but rejoined WLS in 1976, remaining with the station until 1987. In 1968, a mid-twenty-something Chuck Buell was recruited as the youngest on-air radio personality for a major market contemporary hit music station to date to host the early evening 6 p.m. to 10 p.m. show. An equally young Kris Eric Stevens soon followed a few months later to follow for the 10 p.m. to 2 a.m. show. In 1972, John Records Landecker joined WLS, remaining with the station until 1981. Landecker returned to WLS in 1986, and remained with the station until its format was changed in 1989. Tommy Edwards joined the station as production director in 1972 having previously worked at WOR-FM in New York, becoming program director one year later, and later becoming a mid-day DJ. Bob Sirott joined WLS in June 1973, remaining with the station until December 1979.

Other DJs on WLS during its top 40 era included Joel Sebastian, Gary Gears, J. J. Jefferies, Jerry Kay, Yvonne Daniels, Brant Miller, Tom Kent, Steve King, Jeff Davis, and Fred Winston. Some of the production directors responsible for the sound of WLS were Ray Van Steen, Hal Widsten, Jim Hampton, Bill Price and Tommy Edwards.

In the 1960s, WLS was a major force in introducing new music and recording artists. The first US airplay of a record by The Beatles ("Please Please Me") was on Dick Biondi's show on February 8, 1963.

WLS was voted by broadcasters nationally as "Radio Station of the Year" in 1967, 1968 and 1969. John Rook was named "Program Director of the Year" in 1968 and 1969 as WLS was estimated attracting 4.2 million listeners weekly by Pulse research.

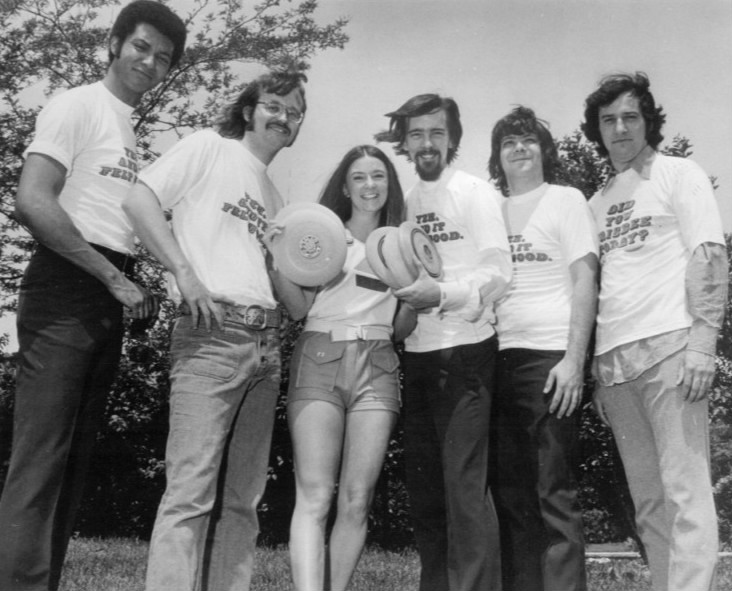
WLS disk jockeys at a Frisbee promotion, 1972. From left: Bill Bailey, Chuck Knapp, Charlie Van Dyke, Fred Winston and John Records Landecker.

WLS also produced the weekly Silver Dollar Survey from October 14, 1960, to December 22, 1967, broken by the Silver Beatle Survey on February 21, 1964, and the Super Summer Survey from May 5, 1967, to August 25, 1967. The survey nominally contained 40 current song listings, except for occasional weeks when it contained fewer current listings, usually 20, plus a special listing of some of the greatest oldies. From September 18, 1964, through December 25, 1964, the survey consisted of the top 30 pop hits, followed by the top 10 R&B hits. Thereafter, the survey changed its name numerous times (89 WLS Hit Parade, 89 WLS Chicagoland Hit Parade, WLS Musicradio 89, etc.). Starting with the July 20, 1970, survey, the number of listings dropped from 40 to 30, then varying from 25 to 40 starting June 26, 1972, then dropping to 15 by March 9, 1974, then increasing to a high of 45 by the end of 1975. No "take home" surveys were printed from March 13, 1972, through July 16, 1973 (these were limited to one poster-size weekly survey displayed at record shops). The year-end listing was the 20 greatest hits of the year for each year from 1963 through 1966, increased to 89 from 1967 onward.

WLS 1975 logo

Like many AM radio stations of the seventies, WLS edited many of the songs they played into a more "radio-friendly" or "radio edit" (a term still used today) format, usually 3–4 minutes in length. Other special editions of some Top 40 songs exclusively made for their broadcasting were done by the musicians themselves or sometimes by the WLS audio engineers. An example of these included Reunion's 1974 song "Life Is a Rock (But the Radio Rolled Me)". Reunion changed the song's lyrics from "Life is a rock but the radio rolled me" to "Life is a rock/WLS rolled me". A similar version was made for competitor WCFL. Another "WLS-only" version was a combination of Captain and Tennille's "Love Will Keep Us Together" and "Por Amor Viviremos", which featured alternating English and Spanish vocals.

By the mid-1970s, WLS became conservative about introducing new songs, and many record promoters referred to the station as the "World's Last Station" to add new releases for airplay, usually only after the songs had reached the top 10 on the Billboard Hot 100. However, in 1974, the station started playing the track "Lady" by the Chicago band Styx from an older album of theirs, resulting in other stations around the country adding the song and making the track Styx' first national Top 40 hit.

By 1978 throughout Musicradio to Talkradio, WLS has used jingles from JAM Creative Productions, with their first packages Class Action and Pro/Mod (which was also made for WABC (1978) to Rockin' for America (1986) in the Musicradio era, and Talk Action (1990) and Stage 10 (2010). Since then, JAM has made over 250 jingles for WLS.

During the 1970s WLS ran a Sunday night music interview program called "Musicpeople".

In 1984, Steve Dahl and Garry Meier's program was moved to WLS from WLS-FM, over the objections of the duo, who attempted to have their contract declared invalid. Nevertheless, Dahl and Meier drew higher ratings on WLS than they had on WLS-FM. Dahl and Meier left WLS in 1986, returning to WLUP.

Well into the 1980s, WLS continued as a mainstream Top 40 formatted station. However, beginning in 1985, the station would begin to undergo major changes. In January 1985, the station began airing Sex Talk on Sunday nights, hosted by Phyllis Levy, a sex therapist. By 1987, WLS was airing adult contemporary music, liberally laced with oldies and standards, with talk programming at night. During the 1980s, Les Grobstein was hired as the first and only full-time Sports Director of WLS and broke the story of Cubs manager Lee Elia's famous tirade on April 29, 1983, after a loss to the Los Angeles Dodgers, which included 54 profanities.

=== Talkradio era ===
WLS logo for its early Talk Radio years.

In June 1989, WLS announced it was going all-talk by the end of the summer. Rumors were that the change was to happen September 1. Air personalities were becoming more talk-intensive anyway and midday talk was added as well. But quietly, with no warning, on August 23, 1989, at 7 pm, WLS stopped playing music altogether. Phil Duncan was the last DJ to play music on WLS, and as Duncan finished up his show, a voice in the back of the studio (that of then-WYTZ DJ Steven Craig) was heard saying "Goodnight!" (Craig unknowingly (and unofficially) became the last live voice on Musicradio WLS.) Appropriately, the last song was "Just You 'n' Me" by Chicago. WLS then became a talk station, with Sally Jesse Raphael as its first host.

In the beginning of the talk format, WLS featured high-rated talk talents from around the country, such as Bob Lassiter from Tampa Bay, Stacy Taylor from San Diego and the station's biggest hit, Rush Limbaugh out of New York. After a few years, however, Lassiter, Taylor and some of their other national hosts were dropped in favor of more local hosts. Jay Marvin also had several stints on WLS, where he was one of the few liberal voices on its political talk shows, which had mostly conservative viewpoints. The station served as the "flagship" broadcast outlet for the Sunday night, national political talk show, Beyond the Beltway with Bruce DuMont. In 1990, WLS radio moved to the studios of its then-sister station WLS-TV at 190 North State Street.

By 1992, WLS had such low ratings that ABC's national management was planning on flipping the station to a satellite-fed country format (management went so far as to distribute an all-staff memo and hosts being told they were about to be let go). However, in what was described as an "eleventh hour decision", ABC canceled the planned format change due to convincing from local management. Throughout the 1990s, ratings began to grow, with the station occasionally ranked in the Top 10.

On Memorial Day, 2007, WLS took a cue from sister station WABC and ran a special day of musical programming, "The Big 89 Rewind", featuring live visits from Larry Lujack, Tommy Edwards, Fred Winston, Chris Shebel, Jeff Davis, John Records Landecker, Tom Kent, and other DJs, sounders, and airchecks from the Musicradio era. The broadcasts re-aired on Independence Day 2007, and there was a new Rewind in 2008.

=== Cumulus ownership ===
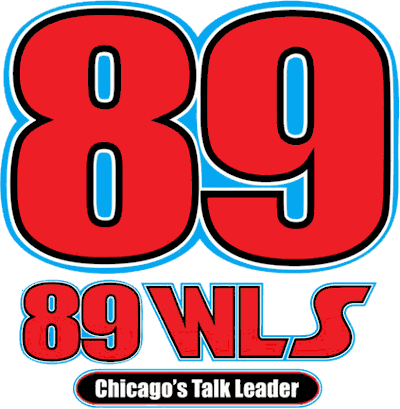
2012 logo

ABC-owned radio stations which were not affiliated with ESPN Radio or Radio Disney, including WLS, were sold to Citadel Broadcasting on June 12, 2007, with Citadel licensing the name ABC Radio for 2 years after the sale. Citadel was acquired by Cumulus Media on September 16, 2011.

Cumulus Media terminated its affiliation with overnight radio program Coast to Coast AM on many of its stations, including WLS. In the spring of 2012, it began airing its own Red Eye Radio.

Longtime morning show hosts Don and Roma Wade retired in December 2012. They had been off the air since October due to Don Wade's cancer treatments. On September 6, 2013, Don Wade died of a brain tumor.

Cumulus radio stations made a break with ABC at the end of 2014, when they no longer carried ABC News Radio. WLS and most Cumulus news/talk stations began running Westwood One News on January 1, 2015. (Westwood One is a Cumulus subsidiary.) This lasted until August 30, 2020, when Westwood One shuttered its news service, and as of August 31, 2020, the station is once again affiliated with ABC News Radio.

In January 2017, WLS and WLS-FM moved from its 190 N. State Street studios to its new studios in NBC Tower on North Columbus Drive in Streeterville. In addition, the station became the new affiliate of NBC News Radio. On January 2, 2017, the station added the on-air team of Bob Sirott and Marianne Murciano from WGN (AM); the former marking his return to WLS for the first time since 1980. However, Sirott and Murciano were cut from the station's lineup, beginning January 1, 2018.

On July 1, 2025, WLS inked a new affiliation deal with Fox News Radio to carry its hourly headlines, breaking news, and long-form special programming from Fox News Media.

==== Sports ====
On June 23, 2015, WLS announced that the station had picked up broadcasting rights for Chicago White Sox baseball starting with the 2016 season. In addition, WLS had also picked up broadcasting rights for Chicago Bulls basketball, beginning with the 2016-17 NBA season. Due to Cumulus's January 2018 Chapter 11 bankruptcy, the carriage rights were terminated in the filing. The Bulls moved to WSCR, taking effect immediately at the start of February, while the White Sox shifted to WGN several weeks later.

In the 2015–16 season, WLS carried Notre Dame Fighting Irish football and basketball games. In 2016, Notre Dame moved to WMVP.

In 2019, WLS agreed to a five-year deal to become the Fighting Illini Sports Network's Chicago affiliate.

In 2023, WLS became the home for NASCAR, as the Chicago affiliate station for the Motor Racing Network, airing NASCAR Cup Series races, as well as both of the first NASCAR Chicago Street Races, The Loop 121 in the NASCAR Xfinity Series and the Grant Park 220 in the Cup Series.

In 2023, WLS became the affiliate station for Chicago Fire soccer.

== See also ==
- List of three-letter broadcast call signs in the United States
