= West 57th =

West 57th may refer to:

- West 57th Street (Manhattan), in New York City, US
- West 57th (TV program), a news magazine 1985–1989
