= Robin Robinson =

American journalist (born 1957)

- Born: Robin Carolle Robinson; August 4, 1957 (age 69); Chicago, Illinois, U.S.
- Education: Claremont High School; San Diego State University
- Occupations: News anchor and reporter
- Years active: 1979–present
- Children: 2

Robin Carolle Brantley (born August 4, 1957), known professionally as Robin Robinson, is an American broadcaster best known for her 27 years as main news anchor at Fox-owned WFLD-TV in Chicago. She works in radio at WBBM (AM) as a fill-in anchor/reporter and WVON as host of her own show, 'Robin's Nest.'

== Early life and education ==
Born in Chicago, Robinson is the daughter of Louie Robinson, who was the West Coast editor for Ebony, and Mati Robinson. Robinson moved with her family to Pomona, California in 1960 and to Claremont, California in 1963. She graduated from Claremont High School, helping to integrate the school.

Robinson earned a bachelor's degree from San Diego State University.

== Professional career ==
Robinson began her career in 1979 working for KGTV-TV in San Diego as a reporter and morning news reader. In 1982, she shifted to KMGH-TV in Denver as a consumer reporter.

In 1984, Robinson joined WBBM-TV as a consumer reporter and later was promoted to news anchor. Robinson worked for WBBM-TV until 1987, when she joined the staff of WFLD-TV in Chicago as part of its first evening news anchoring team, alongside fellow KMGH alum Kris Long. In taking the WFLD job, Robinson passed on an offer to return to KGTV in San Diego as an anchor, according to a June 24, 1987 report in the Chicago Sun-Times.

In 1993, Robinson was joined on the anchor desk by longtime Chicago news anchor Walter Jacobson. Robinson and Jacobson worked together until Jacobson retired in 2006.

Robinson co-anchored WFLD's late local news with Bob Sirott. She has won numerous local Emmy awards for her work.

She also has appeared on multiple episodes of Fox's The Chicago Code as a Fox Chicago reporter alongside Bob Sirott.

In November 2013, Robinson stepped down as weeknight anchor of WFLD's 9PM newscast after 26 years. She was reassigned the new role of host of the station's special segment, 'Chicago at the Tipping Point,' which focused on the growing violence in the city. She stayed in that role until July 28, 2014, when she left WFLD after a 27-year run.

In April 2015, she was hired as a fill-in anchor/reporter for WBBM (AM) NewsRadio 780. On May 12, 2015, she was hired to host her own show on WVON-FM. In September 2015, Robinson, along with former colleague and anchor Lauren Cohn joined 'In The Loop,' a half-hour public affairs news program on WYCC, the PBS station in Chicago.

During the mayoralty of Rahm Emanuel, she held a public outreach role with the Chicago Police Department. Robinson left this role during the mayoralty of Lori Lightfoot.

== Santa Claus Controversy ==
On December 1, 2011, during a live 9 p.m. newscast, while speaking with another on-air reporter, Robinson said, "There is no Santa." The station received numerous telephone calls and emails complaining about her comment. Robinson later apologized and said that she should have given viewers the opportunity to take any children out of the room before making the comment.

== Personal life ==
Robinson dated educator, author, and businessman Stedman Graham from 1982 until 1985.

She has been married three times. Robinson was married to retired track and field sprinter Steve Williams in the 1980s. Her second marriage was to NBC spot salesman Terrence Brantley from July 1986 until 1990, and they share daughter Jade (1989). Her third marriage was to Dennis Allen from June 1991 until 1994, and they share son Cameron (October 1991).

Robinson lives in the Bucktown neighborhood on Chicago's Northwest Side.
