= Mississippi Today =

Mississippi nonprofit newsroom

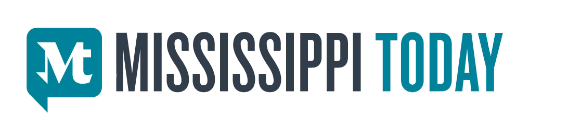
- Website type: Nonprofit online newsroom
- Available in: English
- Headquarters: Jackson, Mississippi
- Owner: Deep South Today
- Founder: Andrew Lack
- Editor: Emily Wagster Pettus
- CEO: Mary Margaret White
- Website: mississippitoday.org
- Launched: May 2016; 10 years ago
- ISSN: 0746-2247
- OCLC number: 1080317596

Mississippi Today is a nonprofit online newsroom headquartered in Jackson, Mississippi. Launched in 2016, it was founded by former Netscape president Jim Barksdale and his wife Donna, alongside former NBC chairman Andrew Lack, to address the decline in local news coverage in Mississippi. Initially focused on state government and investigative journalism, the publication has since expanded its coverage to include topics such as criminal justice, health policy, higher education, the environment, and sports. Known for its commitment to watchdog journalism, Mississippi Today brands itself as a nonpartisan organization and adheres to the Society of Professional Journalists' Code of Ethics.

The organization gained national recognition in 2022 for its investigative reporting on the Mississippi welfare funds scandal, a series of stories that earned reporter Anna Wolfe the Pulitzer Prize for Local Reporting in 2023. Mississippi Today has also been a finalist for the 2024 Pulitzer Prizes and received numerous other accolades for its work. Supported by grants from major foundations and individual donors, the newsroom collaborates with national and regional outlets such as ProPublica, the Associated Press, and the New York Times to contribute to its reporting. In 2023, Mississippi Today acquired the Mississippi Center for Investigative Reporting.

== History ==
In 2014, Mississippi Today's parent company Deep South Today, formerly Mississippi News and Information Corporation, incorporated. It received 501(c)(3) tax-exempt status in 2015. Jim Barksdale, his wife Donna, and former NBC chairman Andrew Lack formed Deep South Today to compensate for dwindling local news coverage. Mississippi Today started publishing in May 2016 as a state watchdog. Deep South Today formed a sister newsroom, New Orleans–based and focused Verite, in 2022.

In February 2023, Jerry Mitchell's Mississippi Center for Investigative Reporting merged with Mississippi Today. The company overhauled its website in October 2025 for the first time since 2021.

== Content ==
Mississippi Today was initially founded as an online newsroom to cover state government and politics, focusing on watchdog and investigative journalism. Mississippi Today describes itself as a nonpartisan news organization. The organization now covers criminal justice, higher education, health policy, the environment, and sports. The editor-at-large, Marshall Ramsey, produces cartoons.

In 2022, Mississippi Today received national attention for breaking the Mississippi welfare funds scandal, receiving a Pulitzer Prize for Local Reporting. Former governor Phil Bryant sued Mississippi Today and its investigative reporter on the scandal, Anna Wolfe, for defamation. A judge dismissed the case in April 2025.

Mississippi Today has often collaborated with other news organizations like the Associated Press, the New York Times, ProPublica, and The Marshall Project. The organization partnered with Siena College Research Institute for polling in the 2023 Mississippi elections.

== Organization ==
Mississippi Today is a nonprofit journalism organization and a member of the Institute for Nonprofit News. As of 2024, it is supported by grants from foundations, including the Knight Foundation, Ford Foundation, Public Welfare Foundation, and David and Lucile Packard Foundation, as well as via tax deductible contributions from donors such as Archie Manning, John Grisham, Shepard Smith, and Dick Molpus. It previously received donations from former Mississippi governors Haley Barbour and William Winter.

The newsroom is headquartered in Ridgeland, Mississippi. It is an affiliate member of the Mississippi Press Association and a partner with States Newsroom. Mississippi Today also reached a content-sharing agreement with the Associated Press in 2024.

=== Personnel ===
The organization's staff includes editor-in-chief Emily Wagster Pettus, a former reporter for the Associated Press and other Mississippi publications, and CEO Mary Margaret White. Marshall Ramsey, an editorial cartoonist, is the publication's editor-at-large. Journalists adhere to the Society of Professional Journalists' Code of Ethics.

In 2023, the staffers unionized through the National Association of Broadcast Employees and Technicians, and management agreed to recognize the union.

== Awards ==
Mississippi Today has won awards for its journalism from the Mississippi Press Association, the Online News Association, and the Hillman Foundation. Mississippi Today investigative reporter Anna Wolfe won a 2023 Pulitzer Prize for Local Reporting for her investigation of the Mississippi welfare funds scandal. It was a 2024 Pulitzer Prize for Local Reporting finalist for Jerry Mitchell's investigation into Mississippi sheriffs. Other awards include being named a Goldsmith Prize finalist, the National Press Club's John R. Aubuchon Award for Press Freedom, the University of Mississippi's Silver Em Award, Green Eyeshade Awards for best journalism in the Southeast the Society of Professional Journalists, and the Local Media Association's Digital Innovation Award.

== Affiliations or partnerships ==
- Mississippi Press Association
- Institute for Nonprofit News
- States Newsroom
