= Andrew Lack (executive) =

American media executive

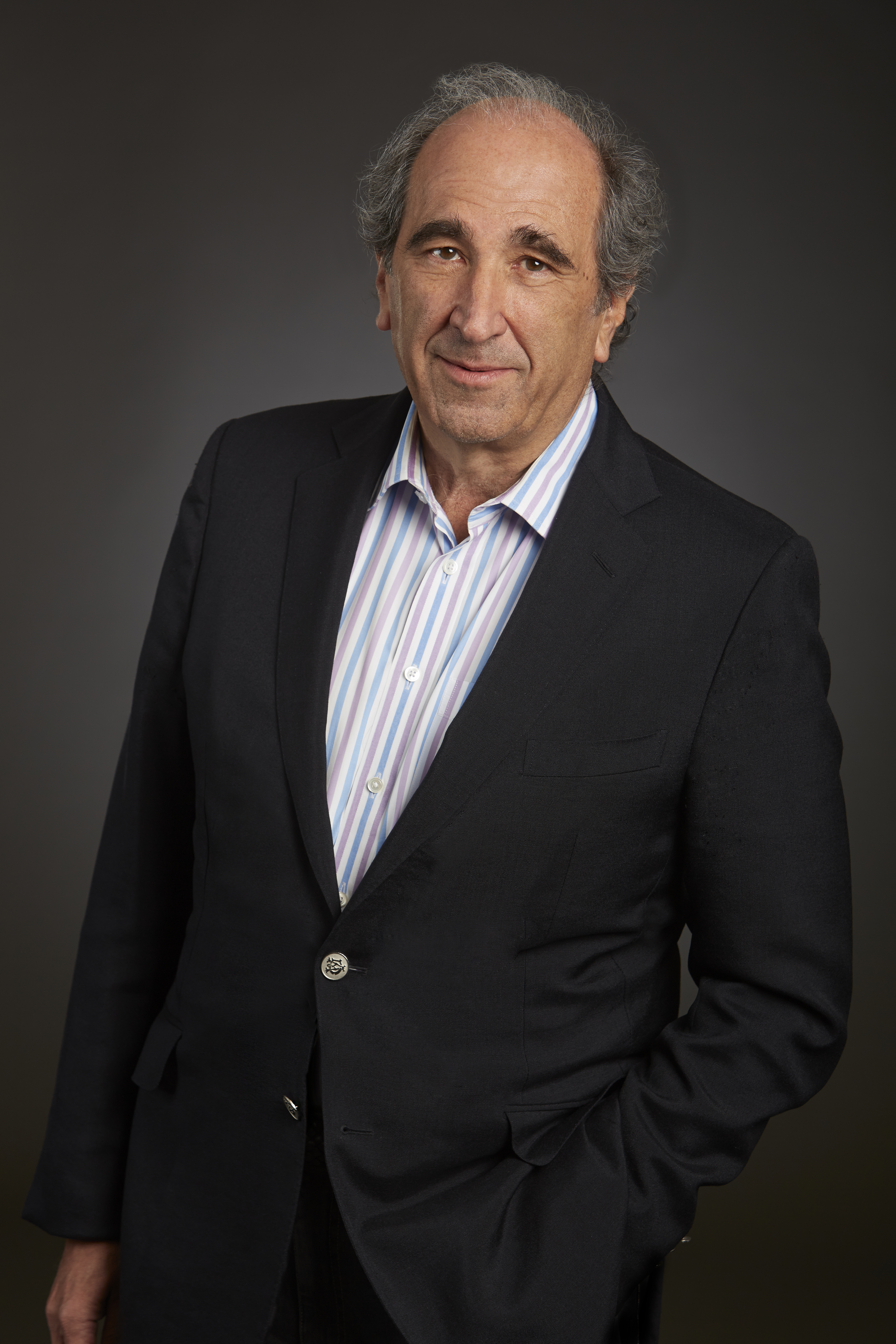
- Born: May 16, 1947 (age 79); New York City, U.S.
- Education: Boston University
- Occupations: Former chairman of NBC News and MSNBC
- Spouse: Pamela Goldman (m. 1970; div. 1985) Betsy Kenny (m. 1992; div. 2020)
- Children: 3

Andrew Lack (born May 16, 1947) is a journalist, television and media executive. He was the chairman of NBC News and MSNBC from 2015 to 2020

Prior to NBCUniversal, Lack held a series of media executive positions, including as the chairman and CEO of Bloomberg Media Group; chairman and CEO of Sony Music Entertainment; and president and chief operating officer of NBC.

He began his career as a journalist and then producer at CBS, winning 10 Emmy Awards and 2 Peabody Awards as a television producer. Lack is the executive producer of the PBS series Deadlock. He is the founder of the non-profit news organization Mississippi Today and its parent company, Deep South Today.

== Early life ==
Lack was born in New York City to a Jewish family. He attended the Browning School, a private school in New York, before graduating from Connecticut boarding school The Gunnery. He studied at Paris-Sorbonne University and graduated from Boston University's College of Fine Arts in 1968. After graduation, he appeared as an actor in numerous television commercials and an off-Broadway production.

== Career ==
After graduating he worked as a producer of TV commercials, joined CBS News in 1976, following the next year with 60 Minutes and from 1978 until 1985, produced CBS Reports. He also served as correspondent on The American-Israeli Connection in 1982. Lack worked with Bill Moyers during the early 80s, as producer of both Our Times With Bill Moyers (1983) and Crossroads (1984).

=== CBS ===
In 1976, Lack was hired by 60 Minutes creator Don Hewitt at CBS News as a producer for the personality-driven television show Who's Who. That led to a job as a producer for 60 Minutes. Lack produced such segments as "Inside Afghanistan" and "Kissinger and The Oil Embargo." He wrote and directed the segment "The Real Malcolm X: An Intimate Portrait of the Man."

He later became the executive producer for CBS Reports, where he stayed for seven years, followed by a four-year stint starting in 1985 as the executive producer of West 57th hosted by Meredith Vieira, a long-format news program. West 57th was known for mixing new storytelling techniques and topics with the same journalistic standards as 60 Minutes. During the course of the show he conducted an extramarital affair with one of his correspondents, Jane Wallace, who described him as "almost unrelenting" in his pursuit of her. After the affair ended, she says Lack threatened her career and the network paid her for a non-disclosure agreement; a source close to Lack denied the allegations.

His work as a CBS producer includes "The Boat People" (about Vietnamese refugees), "Teddy" (about Ted Kennedy) and "The Defense of the United States" (about the Cold War) with Walter Cronkite.

=== NBC ===
Lack was hired as president of NBC News in 1993, in part to restore credibility to the news division, after it was discovered the news program Dateline had faked an explosion during a truck safety segment.

By Lack's third year, NBC Nightly News with anchor Tom Brokaw became the number-one rated evening news program, beating World News Tonight with Peter Jennings on ABC News. Lack also greatly expanded Dateline, from once weekly to multiple nights each week.

After Bryant Gumbel left the Today show, Lack replaced him with Matt Lauer. Lack also moved Today into a new, $15 million street-side studio, known as Studio 1A. With Lauer as anchor, Today became the highest-rated morning news show for the next 16 years. The cable news network MSNBC was also created under Lack.

In 2001, Lack left the news division to become president and chief operating officer of NBC, the television network.

=== Sony ===
Lack joined Sony Music Entertainment in 2003 as chairman and CEO. Amid sharply declining sales in the music industry, Lack cut the staff by 25% to about 6,000 people.

In 2004, Lack led a merger with BMG. Lack became CEO of the new Sony BMG, a 50–50 venture with Germany's Bertelsmann that resulted in the second-largest music company in the world.

At Sony BMG, he pushed the company further into video, including television programming, and had to contend with the erosion of sales because of music file-sharing services such as Napster. In 2005, he signed Bruce Springsteen to a $110 million contract.

In 2006 he became the chairman of Sony BMG. He later created SonyBMG Films, a division that produced numerous titles including Cadillac Records starring Beyonce. In 2008 he left the company.

=== Bloomberg ===
In 2008, Lack returned to broadcast journalism, joining Bloomberg as CEO of its Media Group, running television, radio and digital properties, including 11 television channels internationally. The New York Times reported that he cut losses in half and doubled revenue. He became chairman of Bloomberg Media Group in 2013 and stayed with Bloomberg until 2014.

=== NBCUniversal (2015–2020) ===
Lack rejoined NBC News and MSNBC in 2015 in the aftermath of a crisis generated when NBC Nightly News host Brian Williams was suspended without pay for six months for misrepresenting events which occurred while he was covering the 2003 Iraq War. NBC News also faced a decline in ratings for Today and poor ratings for MSNBC.

Lack named Lester Holt as the new anchor of NBC Nightly News to replace Williams. The show became a ratings success, coming in first for the full 2014–2015 season (four months of which were anchored by Williams).

After Williams' suspension was over, Lack decided to bring him back as the breaking news anchor for MSNBC as part of a shift toward hard news in that network's daytime programming. Lack announced closer collaboration between NBC News and MSNBC, cancelled three opinion-based daytime MSNBC shows, and gave Meet the Press host Chuck Todd a daily afternoon program called MTP Daily. MSNBC ratings subsequently improved in the first quarter of 2016, with daytime viewership up by more than 100%. Lack also unified the digital operations of NBC News and MSNBC under a new division head. Today became the first-place morning news show, surpassing Good Morning America in total viewers as of March 31, 2016, following a six-month lead among the 25–54-year-olds.

In January 2017, Lack announced the hiring of Megyn Kelly away from Fox News saying in a memo, "She's demonstrated tremendous skill and poise, and we're lucky to have her." Kelly was reportedly being paid between $15 million and $20 million a year at NBCUniversal for both a Sunday evening show and the mid-morning Megyn Kelly Today, along with election coverage. In late October 2018, Business Insider reported that Kelly would depart the network following controversial remarks on the nature of blackface.

In 2019, investigative journalist Ronan Farrow claimed that Lack downplayed a human resources complaint of rape against Today anchor Matt Lauer. Farrow, in his book Catch and Kill, also accused Lack of slowing and eventually blocking Farrow's seven-month investigation into Harvey Weinstein. Farrow also alleged that Lack had ordered Richard Greenberg to block reporting on the Harvey Weinstein sexual abuse cases. NBC News denied Farrow's allegations, saying Farrow's reporting at NBC News was not ready for publication in large part because he did not have anyone on the record. On October 10, 2017, The New Yorker ran a story by Farrow about Weinstein with seven named women accusing him of sexual misconduct. Farrow also reported that NBC News hired a "Wikipedia whitewasher" who removed references to NBC News's role in the Harvey Weinstein case from several Wikipedia articles, including Lack's.

In May 2020, NBCUniversal announced Lack would be leaving his position as NBCUniversal Worldwide News Group President by the end of the month, he resigned soon after.

=== Nonprofit journalism ===
In 2016, Lack founded Mississippi Today, a nonprofit news organization that won a Pulitzer Prize in 2022 for its investigation into the Mississippi welfare funds scandal. Mississippi Today was founded under the umbrella of a parent organization also founded by Lack, Deep South Today, which operates nonprofit news organizations in U.S. southern states.

In 2024, Lack became the executive producer of the new PBS series Deadlock, a series of panel discussions modeled after the Fred Friendly Seminars.

== Personal life ==
Lack married twice. In 1970, he married Pamela Ann Blafer in a Jewish ceremony at the Temple Emanu-El in Manhattan. Lack was married to Betsy Kenny Lack from 1992 until their divorce in 2020. He currently resides in New York City with his partner, Bella Patton.

In March 2015, Lack put his 7,000-square-foot mansion in Bronxville, Westchester County, New York up for sale for $4.1 million. In addition, he also owns an additional property in Lake Placid, in New York's Adirondack region.

== Accolades ==
On April 9, 2013, Lack was honored by the UJA-Federation of New York’s Broadcast, Cable & Film Division for his generous support.
