= Jack Conaty =

American journalist (1946–2024)

Jack Conaty (September 26, 1946 – August 28, 2024) was an American broadcast journalist who was the chief political correspondent for WFLD-TV in Chicago from 1987 to 2009.

== Life and career ==
Born in New Haven, Connecticut on September 26, 1946, Conaty held a bachelor's degree in English from Providence College in Rhode Island. After teaching high school English for six years in New Haven, Connecticut, Conaty decided to pursue a master's degree in journalism from the University of Missouri.

Conaty's first job as a reporter was for WTVT-TV in Tampa, Florida, and he subsequently worked at WNET/NJP-TV in New Jersey as a weekend anchor, and at WJLA-TV (the local ABC affiliate in the Washington, D.C. market) as a national correspondent. From 1986 to 1987 he worked for WTTG, the FOX station in the D.C. area, before moving to WFLD. From 1986 to 1989, he won three Emmy Awards and was nominated for several others. He has also been honored with Associated Press awards and the United Press International award for excellence in reporting. A Peabody award was awarded in 2009 while at WFLD-TV.

Conaty was the host of a politically focused talk show, Fox Chicago Perspectives, which airs on Sunday mornings at 8 A.M., C.T. on FOX Chicago.

Conaty died August 28, 2024, at the age of 77.
