= Lauren Cohn =

American radio host

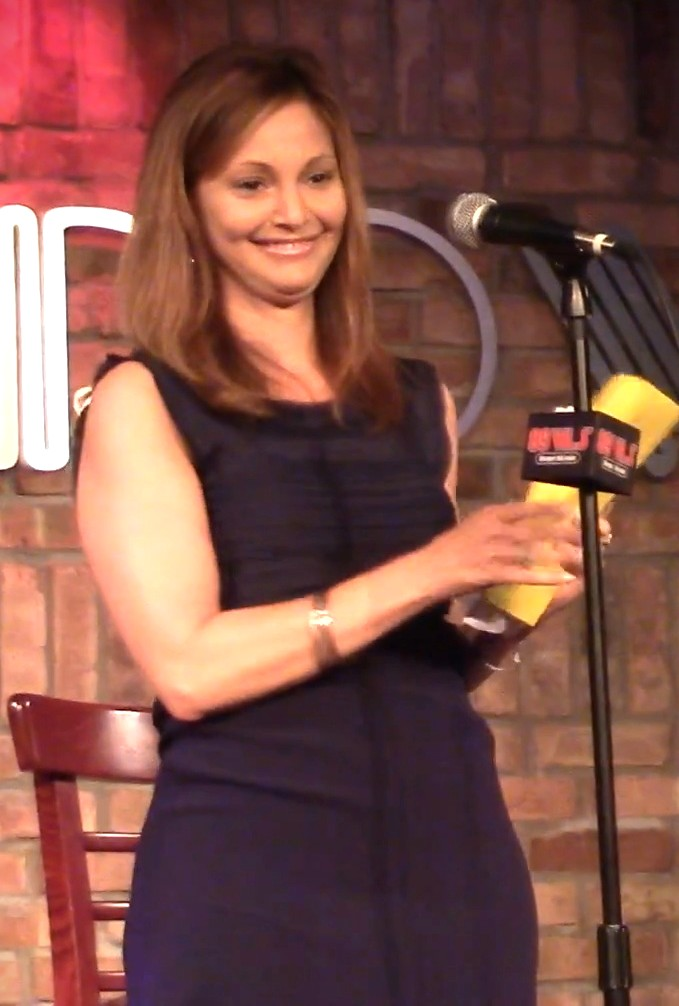
Cohn presents a WLS radio award in 2013

Lauren Cohn is a radio host at WLS (AM) in Chicago. Cohn previously worked as a morning anchor at WLS-TV in Chicago in 1993. She later moved to be an Anchor/general assignment reporter at WBBM-TV in 1998. Then, she worked for WFLD as a general assignment and health reporter. In February 2004, she moved to WCAU-TV in Philadelphia where she worked as an anchor/reporter until March 2007. While with WCAU, she was nominated for the Best Anchor Emmy in 2004 and 2005. Then, she moved back to Chicago to anchor the 10pm Newscast at Fox News Chicago. On August 30, 2010 it was announced that she would be joining WTXF-TV in Philadelphia as the main anchor. She left WTXF in January 2013.

Cohn co-hosted with John Kass 9-11am weekdays at WLSAM890. After Kass/Cohn's radio show ended on Thursday, February 26, 2015, they were both shown the door in yet another WLS programming shakeup, according to blogger Robert Feder. Cohn will be given the opportunity to audition as a possible cohost with morning show host John Howell. Cohn began appearing alongside Howell during the week of March 2, 2015. Meanwhile, it was announced the same day that Chicago radio personality Jonathan Brandmeier was hired by WLS, headed to the former Kass/Cohn timeslot. Further details were to be announced later.
