= Anita Padilla =

American television journalist

- Born: Anita Padilla; Waukegan, Illinois, U.S.
- Education: B.A. in Journalism from Columbia College and attended the University of Wisconsin–Madison
- Occupation: Television journalist/Author
- Years active: 1989–present

Anita Padilla is an American television journalist best known as an anchor and former reporter for Fox Chicago, covering stories that impact the lives of Chicagoans. She is a recipient of two Emmys. She currently serves as a news director at Florida's Voice, a digital news outlet.

== Early life and education ==
Padilla was born in Waukegan, Il a far northeastern suburb of metropolitan Chicago. She later moved to the Quad Cities (Iowa/Illinois), Orlando, Florida and New York City, NY. She currently works for Fox Chicago.

== Education ==
- Columbia College Chicago, B.A. Broadcast Journalism
- University of Wisconsin, Madison, General Studies
- Madison Area Technical College, General Studies

== Career ==
Padilla's first reporting work was as an intern for Bill Kurtis at WBBM-TV. She then worked in radio as an anchor and at Shadow traffic as a traffic editor. At WFTV in Orlando, Florida, she helped to run a news bureau. In 1995, she earned her first Emmy Awards for breaking news coverage of an armed robbery and carjacking in Orlando by a murderer. In 2000, she received a second Emmy for her role in a New Year's Eve Millennium celebration piece while at WMAQ Channel 5 in Chicago. She has reported on many high-profile stories in Chicago, including exclusive interviews with Betty Loren-Maltese on the day of her racketeering conviction and again when she was sentenced to eight years in federal prison. She also covered former Illinois Attorney General Jim Ryan's battle with cancer, the unexpected loss of his young daughter and his wife's heart attack.

In 2013, she was the commencement speaker at Northwestern College.

On December 27, 2023, Anita announced her retirement from journalism on FOX 32's Good Day Chicago. She joined the digital news outlet, Florida's Voice, at the beginning of 2024.

== Awards ==
- Emmy awards 1995 and 2000
