= Anna Wolfe =

American investigative journalist

Anna Wolfe is an American investigative journalist known for her work covering corruption in Mississippi's restitution centers and the welfare funds scandal. In 2023, Wolfe won the Pulitzer Prize for Local Reporting.

== Early life and education ==
Wolfe was born in Washington state and grew up in Tacoma. In 2012, she obtained an AA degree from Pierce College in Washington. That year, Wolfe moved to Mississippi to attend Mississippi State University (MSU), where she was a staff reporter for student newspaper, The Reflector. After graduating in 2014 with a BA degree in communication and journalism, she relocated to Jackson. As of 2023, Wolfe was serving on MSU's print and digital journalism advisory board in the journalism department.

== Career ==
Wolfe is an investigative journalist with Mississippi Today. She and Michelle Liu won the February 2020 Sidney Award and the 2021 Goldsmith Prize for Investigative Reporting for their investigation, in conjunction with The Marshall Project, of Mississippi's restitution centers.

In 2023, Wolfe won a Pulitzer Prize for Local Reporting, a Livingston Award. She also won a second Goldsmith Prize for Investigative Reporting in 2023, for "The Backchannel" (Note: The Backchannel is a five-part series on corruption in Mississippi welfare programs published in Mississippi Today (April 2022).) series, which unearthed new evidence about former Mississippi governor Phil Bryant’s role in the Mississippi welfare funds scandal, inspiring multiple court defendants to come forward with allegations against Bryant, or to publicly insist that Bryant be held accountable. The series also exposes others integral to the scandal, such as former National Football League quarterback Brett Favre; patterns of political nepotism and coercion; and evidence that powerful figures kept millions from people who needed it most.

=== Journalism positions ===
- Jackson Free Press – Investigative reporter (2014)
- Center for Public Integrity – Investigative reporter (April 2015 – November 2015)
- Clarion Ledger – Watchdog reporter (August 2015 – August 2018)
- Mississippi Today – Investigative reporter (September 2018 to present [2024])

== Awards ==
- Bill Minor Prize – "...reporting on unfair medical billing practices and hunger in the Mississippi Delta" ( 2018), "...for investigative journalism" (2019)
- Al Neuharth Innovation in Investigative Journalism Award (2020)
- National Press Foundation Poverty and Inequality Award (2020)
- Sidney Award – for reporting on Mississippi's debtor prisons (2020)
- Green Eyeshade Awards – business reporting (2020), public service in online journalism (2021)
- Goldsmith Prize for Investigative Reporting (2021) and (2023)
- Collier Prize for State Government Accountability (2021)
- John Jay/Harry Frank Guggenheim Excellence in Criminal Justice Reporting Award (2021)
- Livingston Award for local reporting of "The Backchannel: Mississippi’s Welfare Scandal" (2023)
- Pulitzer Prize for local reporting (2023)

== Defamation lawsuit ==
In May 2023, former Mississippi Governor Phil Bryant gave notice of his intent to sue Deep South Today, doing business as Mississippi Today, and its chief executive officer Margaret White for defamation relative to comments she made at a Knight Foundation conference promoting Anna Wolfe's series. White's comments implied that the former governor misused $77 million in welfare funds and accused him of funneling millions of those welfare dollars to family and friends, even though Bryant had not been charged with any crime.

Shortly after Bryant had given notice of his intent to sue, CEO White issued a public apology stating that she misspoke at a recent media conference, that her remarks were not appropriate, and that the former governor had not been charged with any crime. Nevertheless, Bryant proceeded with his civil action (Case: 45CI1:23-cv-00238-JM, Document # 9–2) which was filed in the circuit court of Madison County, Mississippi on July 26, 2023. In the filing, Bryant requested all documents and communications that Anna Wolfe had access to during the writing of her series on the Mississippi welfare scandal.

In July 2024, Mississippi Today requested that the Mississippi Supreme Court reverse a court order requiring the news outlet to turn over Wolfe's welfare scandal documents and the names of her confidential sources to a judge, who would determine if the evidence had relevance to Bryant's defamation case. On December 6, 2024, the Mississippi Supreme Court rejected Mississippi Today's appeal in a 6–2 majority opinion. Mississippi has not enacted shield laws that protect a reporter's privilege.

On April 4, 2025, a circuit court judge in Madison County, Mississippi dismissed Bryant's defamation lawsuit against Mississippi Today stating that Bryant "...had failed to plead any legally viable claims". Bryant appealed that decision to the Mississippi Supreme Court, which came under review in February 2026. In April 2026, the Mississippi Supreme Court revived Phil Bryant's defamation lawsuit against Mississippi Today and ruled that the lawsuit could proceed to trial.
