= Mississippi welfare funds scandal =

Scandal in the United States state of Mississippi that began in 2020

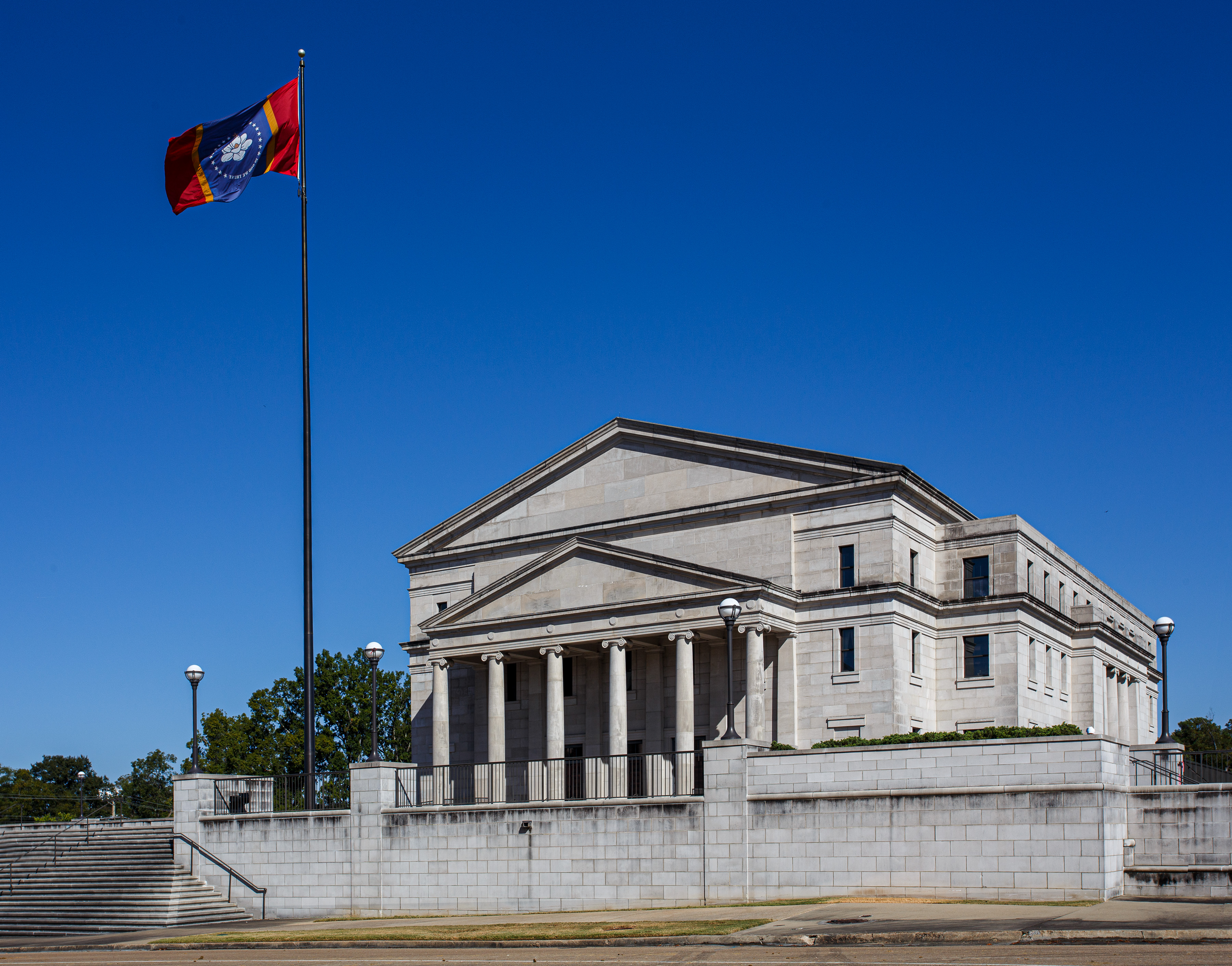
In 2023, the Supreme Court of Mississippi denied former NFL quarterback Brett Favre a motion to dismiss a lawsuit brought by the Mississippi Department of Human Services to recover at least $7 million in misspent TANF funds from Favre.

The Mississippi welfare funds scandal was a major welfare fraud scandal that emerged in the U.S. state of Mississippi from 2020 to 2023, in which several high-profile figures were implicated in allegations of misuse regarding federal welfare funds that were traced to the Mississippi Department of Human Services. The investigation also uncovered attempted laundering of the funds through 501(c)(3) nonprofit organizations, in attempts to conceal the fraud. Investigative journalist Anna Wolfe, who reported the scandal for Mississippi Today, won the Pulitzer Prize for Local Reporting in 2023.

In February 2020, the office of the Mississippi State Auditor arrested six people it accused of mishandling federal funds disbursed by the Mississippi Department of Human Services, including the department's former director. In May, the auditor's office released a report identifying $94 million in questionable spending by the department, much of it being funneled through two nonprofits, the Mississippi Community Education Center and Family Resource Center of North Mississippi.

The auditing investigations found that the money was made available to several high-profile figures for various purposes, including three retired athletes: former professional football star Brett Favre and former wrestlers Brett DiBiase and Ted DiBiase Jr. The revelation of the state investigation also triggered a federal investigation.

== Background ==
By the late 2010s, the Mississippi Department of Human Services annually received approximately $86.5 million from the United States federal government in a Temporary Assistance for Needy Families (TANF) block grant. The federal government required the state of Mississippi to match what it spent of the grant with its own funds and stipulated that the state needed to document impoverished families who received direct cash assistance. It did not have strict reporting standards for how the state chose to use the grant otherwise. State audits regularly criticized the Department of Human Services for lax monitoring controls for federal grant spending.

== Misspending ==
=== Department funding of nonprofits ===
On January 11, 2016, Mississippi Governor Phil Bryant appointed John Davis as the director of the Mississippi Department of Human Services. At the time, the agency was providing a record low number of recipients with direct cash assistance welfare in favor of other programs, such as job training classes. The department did not record who the classes served, and in many instances did not set income level eligibility requirements for class attendees. Davis halted the department's competitive bidding process for acquiring contractors and over four years ordered the agency to grant the nonprofit organizations Mississippi Community Education Center and Family Resource Center of North Mississippi $65 million and $45 million, respectively, to fund the Families First of Mississippi program. The nonprofits received the money upfront and not as reimbursements for tasks performed, as was most common for other nonprofits who worked with the department as TANF subgrantees.

=== Brett Favre and Mississippi state officials ===
In 2020, Brett Favre's involvement with the development and promotion of a concussion treatment drug, Prevasol, by the Prevacus corporation, came under scrutiny. The nonprofit Mississippi Community Education Center (MCEC) received $2.5 million in federal grant funds diverted from Mississippi's TANF welfare funds, as well as tens of millions in public funds as an element of the scheme. The Mississippi state auditor has termed the scheme "the largest public embezzlement case in state history". A grand jury in Hinds County indicted MCEC founder, Nancy New, and her son Zach in the scheme. Favre had introduced MCEC's founders to top state welfare officials.

Bryant later alerted Mississippi State Auditor Shad White about possible fraud inside the Mississippi Department of Human Services. Text messages between Favre, Bryant, and New also revealed how the departure of John Davis, who himself was found to have been involved in the funds scheme, from the Department of Human Services would be used to divert attention and aid funding for the stadium proposal. Favre's daughter played for the school's volleyball team. In addition, Favre was paid $1.1 million in fees for speeches he never delivered and securing $2 million in public funds for a biotech venture which he already invested in. While Favre repaid the $1.1 million in two payments in 2020 and 2021, White sued him in early 2024 for nearly $729,000 in statutory interest.

=== DiBiase family ===
Davis was close friends with retired professional wrestlers Ted DiBiase and his two sons, Ted DiBiase Jr. and Brett DiBiase, and encouraged the two nonprofits to compensate them for various services which the office of the Mississippi State Auditor later determined were not performed or did not serve to benefit needy Mississippians. Davis also frequently involved the DiBiases in department affairs and built a public agency motivational speaking program with Ted DiBiase Jr. that was funded by the nonprofits. From 2017 to 2019, DiBiase Jr.'s companies Priceless Ventures LLC and Familiae Orientem were paid over $3 million by the organizations. During Davis' tenure, the Department of Human Services also awarded grants totaling over $2 million to the Heart of David Ministry, a nonprofit owned by Ted DiBiase. The Northeast Mississippi Football Coaches Association was revealed to have received $30,000 in welfare money in early 2019 as a donation "in consideration of ... having Ted DiBiase Jr. as banquet speaker."

On February 22, 2024 Ted's ex-agent (William J. Bruce III) opened up in an exclusive interview to discuss his thoughts on Ted's involvement where eWrestlingNews quoted him as saying, "it just doesn’t match the man that I’ve known. Ted, is careful in the sense that he wouldn’t do that, he has a real love for God and his wife. He just wouldn’t do that in my honest opinion."

=== Prevacus ===
In December 2018, Jake VanLandingham, the owner of a Florida-based pharmaceutical startup company that developed concussion treatments, Prevacus, was introduced to an official at the Mississippi Community Education Center by a Mississippi investor. VanLandingham had several phone calls with nonprofit staff and a meeting before signing an agreement with the organization. Text messages from November 2018 also revealed that Brett Favre, who had invested in the company since 2014, played a prominent role in connecting VanLandingham with Mississippi Governor Phil Bryant. Later messages suggested Bryant not only agreed to use welfare money as a source for project grant money, but also once sought to become an investor in Prevacus after his term as Governor ended.

=== Other ===
The Mississippi Community Education Center used TANF funds to provide $5 million towards the construction of a volleyball stadium at University of Southern Mississippi (in the form of a brief lease for one event), paid a mortgage on a ranch in Flora, Mississippi, owned by former football player Marcus Dupree, and funded a fitness program run by former football player Paul Lacoste. Dupree was also paid by the Mississippi Community Education Center and Family Resource Center of North Mississippi for a statewide lecture tour.

== Auditing and criminal investigations ==
On June 21, 2019, following the conducting of an internal audit, concerned employees at the Department of Human Services informed Governor Bryant that agency funds may have been misspent. Bryant forwarded the information to State Auditor Shad White, who initiated an investigation. Davis announced his retirement from the directorship the following month. On February 5, 2020, following the delivery of indictments in the Hinds County Circuit Court, special agents from the office of the State Auditor arrested several people whom they accused of embezzling TANF funds: John Davis, Department of Human Services employee Latimer Smith, Brett DiBiase, and Nancy New, Zach New, Anne McGrew, officials of the Mississippi Community Education Center. The defendants initially pleaded not guilty.

Despite the involvement of federal funds, White did not inform any federal authorities about his office's investigation. U.S. Attorney for the United States District Court for the Southern District of Mississippi, Mike Hurst, stated in a press release: "We in the United States Attorney's Office and the FBI only learned ... from media reports about the indictments and arrests, at the same time the general public did." White subsequently shared his office's findings with the Federal Bureau of Investigation and a federal inspector general.

Following the arrests, the Department of Human Services announced it would require stringent documentation from subgrantees and began an internal inquiry to determine if any current agency employees were involved in the impropriety. In early May, White released the Single Audit of the department for the 2019 fiscal year. The auditor's office deemed $94 million of the agency's spending questionable.

Brett DiBiase would plead guilty in December 2020 to making fraudulent statements and paid $5,000 in restitution. As of September 2022, he was still not yet sentenced for his crime. In April 2022, Nancy and Zach New pleaded guilty to charges of bribery of a public official, fraud against the government, and mail fraud. Nancy New would also plead guilty to racketeering.

In September 2022, Davis was indicted in a federal court and pleaded guilty court to one count of conspiracy and one count of theft from a federally-funded program. He then pleaded guilty in state court to five counts of conspiracy and 13 counts of defrauding the government. The state court sentenced him to 90 years in prison, with 58 of those years as a suspended sentence.

On March 2, 2023, Brett DiBiase pleaded guilty to one federal charge of conspiracy to defraud the United States. As of January 2026, he has yet to be sentenced for this charge and awaits his sentencing hearing. On March 16, 2023, Christi Webb, former director of the nonprofit Family Resource Center of North Mississippi, pled guilty to one count of theft concerning federal funds On April 20, 2023, Ted DiBiase Jr. was indicted in federal court on one count of conspiracy to commit wire fraud, one count of conspiracy to commit theft concerning programs receiving federal funds, six counts of wire fraud, two counts of theft concerning programs receiving federal funds and four counts of money laundering. On January 7, 2026, Ted DiBiase Jr.'s criminal trial would begin at the Thad Cochran United States Courthouse.

On January 20, 2026, one of Ted DiBiase Jr.'s attorneys opted to now seek a mistrial, as DiBiase's lead defense lawyer Scott Gilbert was now in poor health. Due to Gilbert's poor health, DiBiase's trial was now stalled. On January 28, 2026, U.S. District Judge for the Southern District of Mississippi Carlton Reeves announced that as a result of Gilbert's uncertain long term health and likely continued absence from the defense team at the recommendation of his physician, DiBiase's trial would be delayed until February 23, 2026. However, Reeves would also deny the defense request to grant DiBiase a mistrial. At the same time, it was also revealed that John Davis, who now had been serving as the star prosecution witness in Ted DiBiase Jr.'s trial, was now suffering from cancer and undergoing chemotherapy. On February 23, 2026, Ted DiBiase Jr.'s trial would resume after a month long delay. After resuming, Judge Reeves would deny another request from DiBiase defense lawyer Eric Herschmann to either delay the trial another six months or declare a mistrial would be denied. In addition, on February 24, 2026, Davis managed to return to DiBiase's trial and would resume testifying on behalf of the prosecution.

On February 25, 2026, Davis would provide text message evidence confirming the closeness of his relationship with the two DiBiase brothers and how he told them he would do anything to help them. In addition to Davis, former Family Resource Center head Christi Webb and Mississippi Community Education Center Nancy New would also testify in late February 2026, with Webb beginning her testimony on February 26. Webb and New which each confirming that their organizations issued contracts to DiBiase and that he received money despite not fulfilling contract obligations and at best delivering one list and nothing else. Davis would back Webb and New's testimonies and also acknowledged that he, out of a need to friendship with DiBiase, personally ordered Webb's organization to dole out money to him.

On March 4, 2026, Mississippi Department of Human Services employee Bridget Bell testified that she found state accounting system records which showed that there were $900,000 in expenses a Ted DiBiase Jr.'s leadership program for a lavish gala, flowers, food, beverages and Polo jackets in DiBiase's leadership program. In addition, former John Davis executive assistant Zola Harelson testified that he had an office at the Mississippi Department of Human Services headquarters in Jackson, despite not being a state employee, and even a state-issued cellphone. The same day, it was announced that DiBiase's trial would not resume until March 16, 2026. On March 16, 2026, DiBiase's trial would resume as scheduled. On this day, Kelly Kiker, chief information officer at BankPlus, would give testimony and verify checks and deposit slips which DiBiase had previously deposited through BankPlus branches in Madison and Rankin counties in 2018. Among these deposits made by DiBiase Jr. included a check for more than $1 million at a Rankin County-based BankPlus on May 3, 2018. FBI forensic accountant Matthew Ackerman, who investigated the matter, would also confirm that from 2017 to 2019, $2.9 million in welfare money had managed to successfully get transferred into two companies owned by DiBiase, with DiBiase spending $1.4 million on a new home, and more of this welfare money also being spent on things such as a new boat and tractor. In his testimony, former Mississippi Department Health and Human Services chief legal counsel Earl Scales also noted that the amount of contracts DiBiase was given was against manual policy, though he also noted he was at the time not given the authority to review the contracts. It was also announced that the prosecution was now wrapping up their case against DiBiase.

On March 17, 2026, the prosecution in the case of Ted Dibiase Jr. would finally rest. The same day, the defense would again file a motion to dismiss the charges against DiBiase Jr., only for Judge Reeves to once again reject this request. DiBiaise Jr.'s defense then began calling witnesses, with Alabama software developer Kevin McLendon being the first witness to testify on behalf of the defense. DiBiase Jr.'s defense had been slated to call at least two witnesses. On March 18, 2026, the presiding judge informed the trial's jury that DiBiase's trial was close to its end. The same day, the defense called its second witness New Orleans-based consultant Matt Theriot. After calling four witnesses over a period of two days, DiBiase's defense would rest its case on March 18, with DiBiase not testifying. While rebutting the defense, the prosecution would present a text message which contradicted defense witness Nicholas Coughlin and showed that DiBiase had in fact planned on pretending to not know how to form an LLC group. On March 19, 2026, Judge Reeves would read jury instructions, with attorneys for both the prosecution and the defense delivering that day as well.

Jury deliberations began March 20, 2026. The same day, Dibiase would be acquitted on all charges. Ted DiBiase Jr. would be the first, and potentially only, defendant in the Mississippi welfare funds scandal whose case resulted in a criminal trial. The other remaining defendants in the scandal who were criminally charged have pleaded guilty and had agreed to aid the prosecution.

== Civil proceedings ==
In October 2021, the state auditor's office sent demand letters to various recipients of the misspent grant money, asking for repayment. In May 2022, the Department of Human Services filed a lawsuit against 38 defendants to get back about $24 million in misspent funds. Former federal prosecutor Brad Pigott and the office of the Mississippi Attorney General represented the department. The defendants included Brett Favre, Marcus Dupree, Paul Lacoste, and the DiBiases. On July 22, the director of the Department of Human Services, Bob Anderson, fired Pigott from his position as lead counsel on the state's lawsuit. Pigott alleged the decision was politically motivated. Anderson initially attributed the dismissal to Pigott's failure to inform his superiors about his plans to subpoena documents concerning the volleyball stadium from the University of Southern Mississippi before saying that the state needed a larger legal team. Pigott was replaced the following month by attorneys from the firm Jones Walker.

In August 2023, the Mississippi Supreme Court denied Brett Favre's request to be removed as a defendant from the civil lawsuit. The decision came nearly four months after a Hinds County judge dismissed a similar request as well.

=== Defamation lawsuit ===
Former governor Phil Bryant subsequently sued Mississippi Today, the outlet which broke the story, and its lead reporter, Anna Wolfe, alleging defamation. The suit was dismissed in 2025.

== See also ==
- 2020s Minnesota fraud scandals
