= West 57th (TV program) =

- Created by: Andrew Lack; Howard Stringer
- Starring: Meredith Vieira; John Ferrugia; Jane Wallace (1985–1988); Bob Sirott (1985–1988); Karen Burnes (1988–1989); Selina Scott (1987–1988); Steve Kroft (1987–1989); Stephen Schiff (1988–1989)
- Theme music composer: Edd Kalehoff
- Country of origin: United States

Production
- Executive producer: Andrew Lack
- Running time: 60 minutes, including commercials

Original release
- Network: CBS
- Release: August 13, 1985 – September 9, 1989

West 57th is a news magazine television program that aired on CBS from August 13, 1985, through September 9, 1989. West 57th originally premiered as a summer show, and took its name from the New York City address of the CBS Broadcast Center, 524 West 57th Street. The original correspondents were Jane Wallace, Bob Sirott, Meredith Vieira and John Ferrugia. Later contributors included Steve Kroft, Selina Scott, Karen Burnes and Stephen Schiff.

The program's popularity, a concern for 60 Minutes creator Don Hewitt, prompted pundit Andy Rooney to dedicate one of the closing segments on his program to a parody of West 57th correspondents. This was widely interpreted by the West 57th team that Hewitt perceived their show as a threat.

After the cancellation, the program was replaced by Saturday Night with Connie Chung, and then 48 Hours. Vieira and fellow correspondent Steve Kroft transferred to 60 Minutes, from which Kroft retired in 2019. Vieira went on to anchor NBC's Today Show (after appearing on The View for nine years). Sirott moved to Chicago to continue a successful career in local TV and radio. John Ferrugia moved to Denver, where he has been an investigative reporter and is currently anchor and managing editor of Insight with John Ferrugia at Rocky Mountain PBS.

== Reaction ==
Despite serious reporting on issues like the Iran–Contra affair, the Space Shuttle Challenger disaster, and the dangers of grey market drugs, the program was criticized for its slickness and superficiality. This may have been because 60 Minutes executive producer Don Hewitt campaigned against the program both internally at CBS and through media contacts outside the company. The Christian Science Monitor called it "a ditsy, disco-beat docu-mag for viewers with a short attention span".

In The New York Times, John Corry wrote that the program "isn't really television, and it certainly isn't journalism; it's video, and it's a mess. Nothing works well except the synthesizer music. It's as if news and entertainment fell into combat and neither side won." By contrast, The Washington Post critic Tom Shales wrote of a particular segment, "What's again impressive is the quality of footage obtained, especially unusual on an investigative piece like this. 'West 57th' is raising the standards of broadcast journalism as far as video photography and editing are concerned."
