= Mississippi Press Association =

Organization of newspapers in Mississippi

- Formation: 1866; 160 years ago
- Headquarters: Jackson, Mississippi
- President: George Turner
- Vice President: Peter Imes
- Subsidiaries: Mississippi Press Services
- Website: https://www.mspress.org/

The Mississippi Press Association (MPA) is a trade association located in the capital city of Jackson, Mississippi, which represents newspapers and newsrooms from Mississippi. It was founded in 1866 and is the sixth-oldest press association in the U.S.

== History ==
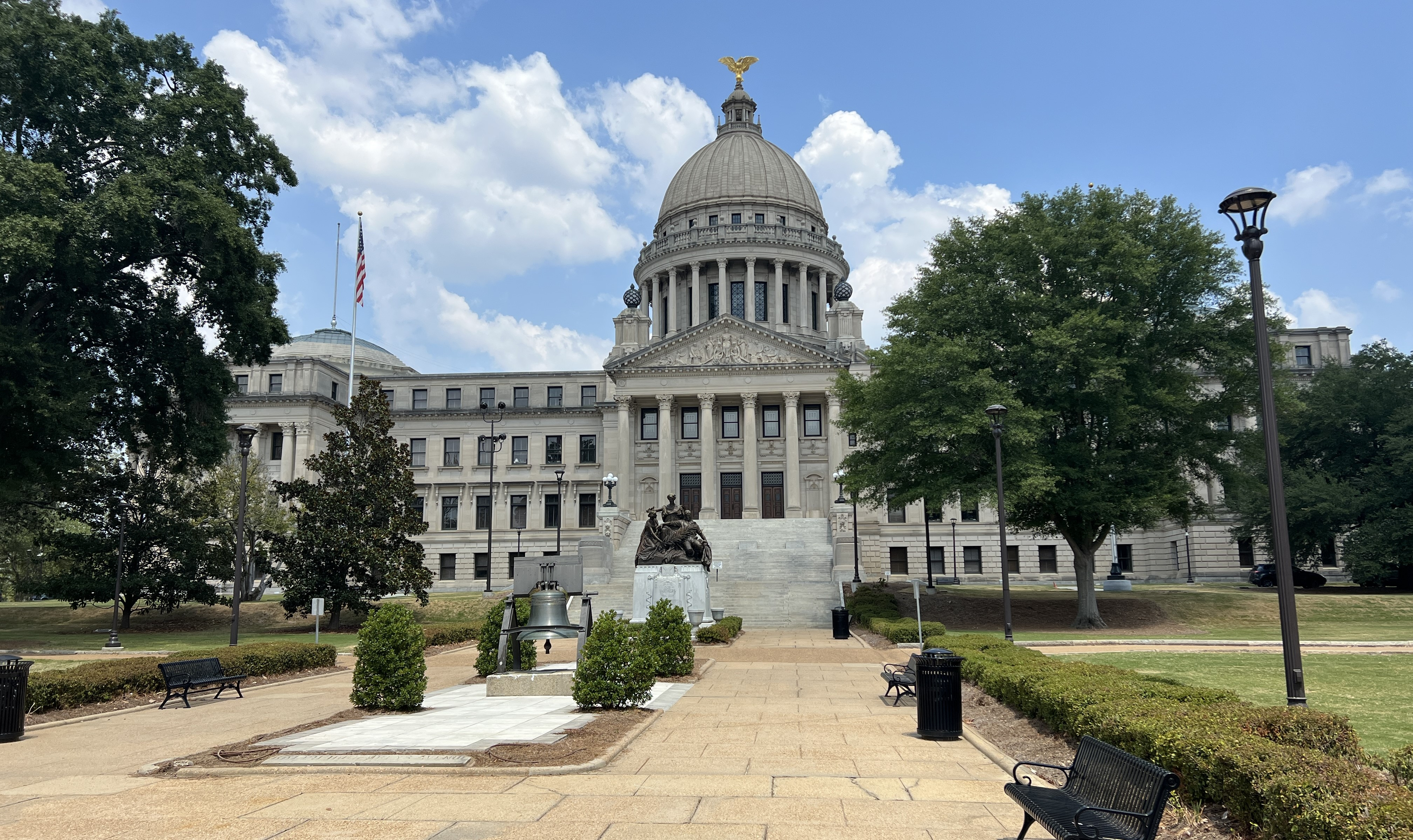
The Mississippi Press Association's first meeting was held in the statehouse in Jackson, Mississippi.

The Mississippi President Association was founded in 1866, holding its first meeting in May in the statehouse in Jackson, Mississippi. The founders were J. L. Power, P. K. Mayers, J. S. Hamilton, A. J. Frantz, J. J. Shannon, J. M. Partridge, B. W. Kinsley, F. T. Cooper, and E. M. Yeger. It is the sixth-oldest press association in the U.S. It celebrated its sesquicentennial in 2016. The association's first bylaws were chartered in 1980.

The for-profit business subsidiary, Mississippi Press Services, was founded in 1978. It handles advertising buys for newspapers.

William Raspberry was the first African American inducted into the MPA's hall of fame, he grew up in Mississippi and was inducted in 2000. In 1994, he won a Pulitzer Prize. There has not been a black president of the organization. Jackie Hampton, publisher of The Mississippi Link in Jackson has been on the MPA's Board of Directors.

== Organization structure ==
The organization is headquartered in Jackson, Mississippi. 93 newspapers across Mississippi are full members, six newspapers are affiliate members, and six organizations are digital affiliates. Full membership requires weekly printing that must be bought. Affiliates do not meet the full criteria for membership but still receive some association benefits.

The association provides scholarships to journalism students in Mississippi institutions and grants to journalism programs through a foundation established in 1983. It also hosts conferences and conventions, offers a legal hotline, a job bank for professional employment, a lending library, and newspaper awards.

=== Leadership ===
The current president is George Turner of the Greene County Herald, and the current vice president is Peter Imes of The Commercial Dispatch.

The first president was J.L. Shannon of The Clarion. Erle Johnston of The Scott County Times was elected in 1949 as the youngest president ever of the association. In the 1890s, Kate Markham Power was the first woman to appear before the association. In 1977, Marie Harris Luke of the Daily Times Leader was the first woman elected to the board of governors and in 1980, the first woman elected president.
