= Bob Sirott =

American broadcaster (born 1949)

- Born: August 9, 1949 (age 77); Chicago, Illinois, U.S.
- Education: Theodore Roosevelt High School
- Alma mater: Columbia College Chicago
- Occupation: Journalist
- Years active: 1971–present
- Employer(s): WBBM-FM (1971–1973); WLS (AM) (1973–1979); WGN (AM) (2007–2010; 2013–15; 2020–present)
- Television: WBBM-TV (1980–1985); CBS (1985–1988); WMAQ (1989–1993; 2006–2009); WFLD (1994–2000; 2010–2013); WTTW (2002–2005); Marquee Sports Network (2022–present)
- Spouses: Carrie Cochran (m. 1981; div. 1999); Marianne Murciano (m. 1999)
- Children: 3

Robert Sirott (born August 9, 1949) is an American broadcaster. He is the morning host at WGN in Chicago. He is also a former television news anchor, most recently working in that role at Chicago's WFLD.

== Professional career ==
Sirott began his career in radio as a summer vacation fill-in disc jockey for WBBM-FM in 1971 before moving to WLS (AM) in 1973. He was a top disc jockey at WLS from 1973 until December 1979. Sirott shifted to television in 1980, taking a job at WBBM-TV. After five years at WBBM, Sirott took a job with the CBS newsmagazine West 57th, although the network allowed him to remain based in Chicago.

Sirott left West 57th in 1988, telling the Chicago Sun-Times in an article that ran on December 22, 1987: "If ('West 57th') were more of a personality-oriented show, and if I had the opportunity to do some live things, I'd be able to withstand it longer. But it's just been too difficult for me to work in this system with 25 different producers and not have hands-on control over my own pieces."

In March 1989, Sirott returned to Chicago's airwaves at WMAQ-TV as a noon news anchor and program host; the following year, he launched and was the co-anchor of WMAQ-TV's First Thing in the Morning along with Allison Rosati. After four years at WMAQ, he was fired in July 1993—for the first time in his career—after he and management had a difference of opinion over his and his show's autonomy.

In March 1994, Sirott returned to work, anchoring Fox Thing in the Morning on Chicago's FOX affiliate WFLD with his future wife Marianne Murciano, until she was moved to another time slot at the station in June 2000. It was ranked high in the Nielsen ratings, and fans were taken aback when they learned that the show was unceremoniously cancelled and renamed Fox News in the Morning. On September 27, 2000, Sirott was bounced as the station's host—concurrent with the show's renaming. News reports had stated that Sirott didn't want to work with new anchor, Tamron Hall, who had replaced his wife, but Sirott downplayed those rumors in a Chicago Sun-Times article on September 28, 2000. "It's not about Tamron," he told the paper. "It's about changes in the focus and direction of the show." Sirott was removed as co-host with 2½ years remaining on his contract, and he was nominally kept on WFLD's payroll to develop new programming for Fox stations and the company's syndication division. On July 19, 2010, Sirott rejoined WFLD as co-anchor of the 9 p.m. news alongside Robin Robinson. He remained in that role until 2013, when his contract expired.

From June 2002 to December 2005, Sirott hosted Chicago Tonight on the Chicago PBS station WTTW. At WTTW he also hosted the "Friday Night Show." His contract was not renewed in 2005 because of cost cutting.

In early 2006, Sirott rejoined WMAQ as a weekend anchor joining Anna Davlantes on the weekend 5 and 10 PM broadcasts. He at one time co-anchored the 4:30 PM newscast with Marion Brooks. He also co-anchored the 5:00, 6:00 and 10:00 PM newscasts (briefly succeeding the now-retired Warner Saunders in this capacity) with Allison Rosati. However, on June 11, 2009, Sirott left WMAQ-TV after he and the station were unable to come to financial terms in the wake of Saunders' departure.

On April 12, 2007, Chicago radio station WGN announced that it was reviving The Noon Show with Sirott as its host. Sirott was removed from The Noon Show on January 25, 2010. He returned to weekday radio at WGN in 2013.

Sirott is also known for his "One more thing" commentaries on various topics, many of which are Chicago related. He was seen in cameo appearances as a reporter on the FOX Dramas Prison Break during its first season and The Chicago Code.

In July 2014, Sirott made his debut as a reporter for the Onion News Network, a parody television news show, with the story "Deadly Super Rainbow Tears Through West Coast."

In December 2019, Nexstar Media announced that Sirott would be replacing Steve Cochran as the morning host of WGN 720-AM.

In 2022, Sirott joined Marquee Sports Network to host the half-hour weekly program "The Reporters," a roundtable discussion among local sports media members in the mold of The Sportswriters on TV and The Sports Reporters. Sirott also hosts "Icons of the Ivy," a program highlighting the legendary figures in the history of the Chicago Cubs.

== Personal life ==
Sirott married his first wife, Carrie Cochran, in 1981 when she was a news anchor at WBBM-TV. They worked together at WFLD until they separated in 1995 prior to their 1999 divorce. He married newscaster Marianne Murciano in June 1999. Sirott has one daughter and two stepchildren with Murciano, and resides in Wilmette, Illinois.

Sirott is the uncle of Judd Sirott, who formerly served as WGN Radio's host for Chicago Blackhawks games. Judd also served in the same capacity for Chicago Cubs broadcasts on the station until they moved to CBS Radio.
