= Jane Wallace (journalist) =

American journalist

- Born: 1956 (age 69–70); St. Paul, MN
- Education: Yale
- Occupation: Journalist

Jane Wallace is an American journalist. She was correspondent for CBS News as well as the news magazine West 57th.

== Education ==
Wallace was one of the first female graduates of Yale College. While there, she also worked part-time at TV stations in Washington, D.C.

== Career ==
After graduating college, she was an on-the-air reporter for a station in New Haven, Connecticut. Wallace was sent to Central America in the 80s by CBS. During her time at CBS, she covered two international stories, the exposition of US government's mining of a Nicaraguan harbor and the hiring of drug-smuggling pilots from the CIA. She also covered the riots in Haiti.

Between 1989 and 1991 she was a host "The Jane Wallace Show" on Lifetime. In 1993, Wallace became co-host of "Equal Time" on CNBC. In 1994, she hosted the half hour news program "Under Scrutiny with Jane Wallace" on the new fX cable television channel.

== Family ==
Wallace has an adopted son named Zach (Zachariah Max). She is the fourth of five girls and a son. Her younger sister named Susan (Suki) Wallace who used to work at a TV station in Chicago. She was a reporter at NBC's South Florida affiliate, WTVJ. Her sister died in January 2018 after a battle with cancer.
