= Marianne Murciano =

American television host

Marianne Murciano (Sirott) co-hosted a morning program called "Fox Thing in the Morning" on Chicago's Fox affiliate (WFLD) from 1993 to 2000, with husband, Bob Sirott. In 2005 Murciano conducted some co-interviews with Sirott for Chicago Tonight. Murciano was born in Havana, and moved to Miami in 1961.
