= Brant Miller =

American broadcaster and meteorologist

- Born: Brant Miller; February 8, 1950 (age 76)
- Years active: 1977–1991, 2008–2010, 2012–present (radio); 1988-present (television)
- Spouse: Lisa Miller
- Presenting career
- Station: NBC 5 Chicago
- Time slot: 4:00 P.M-10:00 P.M

Brant Miller (born February 8, 1950) is the chief meteorologist for NBC owned and operated television station WMAQ-TV in Chicago. At WMAQ-TV he is the meteorologist on NBC 5 News at 5 p.m., 6 p.m. and 10 p.m. Miller joined NBC5 News in 1991.
