= Walter Jacobson =

American journalist (born 1937)

- Born: July 28, 1937 (age 89); Chicago, Illinois, US
- Education: Grinnell College (BA); Columbia University (MA)
- Occupations: Anchorman, News Personality, Television Guest Star
- Years active: 1962–present
- Political party: Democratic
- Spouse(s): Lynn Straus (1960–1970s; divorced), Diana Dybsky (1980–?; divorced), Susan Jacobson (1995–2019)
- Children: 2, including Peter (with Strauss); 2 (with Dybsky)
- Awards: See Awards

Walter David Jacobson (born July 28, 1937) is a former Chicago television news personality and a current Chicago radio news personality. He currently provides opinion segments for WGN Radio AM 720. From 2010 until 2013, he was an anchor of the 6 p.m. news on WBBM-TV in Chicago, where he also had worked from 1973 until 1993. From 1993 until 2006, he was principal anchor on WFLD-TV's FOX News at 9 and the host of FOX Chicago Perspective, a one-hour news and political show that aired Sunday mornings on WFLD.

== Early life ==
Walter David Jacobson was born at Michael Reese Hospital on Chicago's South Side, the son of insurance agent Sam Jacobson and Anne Jacobson. His family lived on Kenmore Avenue in Chicago's far north side. A Chicagoan during his youth, Jacobson's love for the Chicago Cubs led him to become a batboy for the team in 1952 and 1953, and motivated him to his first journalism job as the sports editor for his grammar school newspaper.

In sixth grade, Jacobson's family moved to Glencoe, Illinois. Jacobson attended New Trier High School (Class of 1955), received his bachelor's degree in political science from Grinnell College in 1959 and his master's degree in journalism from Columbia University in New York.

== Newspaper career ==
Jacobson began his career at Chicago's City News Bureau, later joining the Chicago bureau of United Press International. He then joined the reporting staff of the Chicago American newspaper, where he was the legman for legendary columnist Jack Mabley.

== Broadcasting career ==
=== Career at WBBM-TV ===
In 1963, Jacobson left the Chicago American to join WBBM-TV as a news writer, and was promoted to be a full-time reporter in 1968. He became WBBM's political editor in 1970. In 1971, Jacobson was fired by WBBM-TV, and he moved over to WMAQ for two years. In March 1973, he returned to WBBM as an investigative reporter and anchor, co-anchoring the 10 p.m. news for much of the next 16 years with Bill Kurtis. Kurtis and Jacobson formed a legendary anchor team in Chicago and from the mid-1970s to early 1980s the team enjoyed unprecedented ratings dominance. Kurtis left for three years in 1982 to go to CBS News in New York, and WBBM fell out of first place four years later. Jacobson left for WFLD in 1993 after a dispute with WBBM's management. The station slipped into last place two years later.

Jacobson generated significant controversy while at WBBM from his "Walter Jacobson's Perspective" commentaries, which were delivered live from his own office during the station's 10 p.m. newscasts. The commentaries often criticized government waste and political hypocrisy. In May 1983, Jacobson famously criticized Chicago's mayor at the time, Harold Washington, alleging that Washington used city workers to paint and redecorate his apartment. Washington responded that city personnel were only used for security-related modifications. Months later, Washington called out Jacobson at a television academy luncheon, saying, "Walter, you're the bottom of the barrel."

While at WBBM, Jacobson also became known for his temper. In March 1977, he was suspended with pay for two days for being what his news director labeled a "disruptive element" in the newsroom. "I think arguments are healthy, and I certainly don't think I've been abusive," Jacobson told the Chicago Tribune at the time. In April 1986, Jacobson got into a shouting match with Ken Boles, a WBBM executive news producer, in a bank near WBBM's studios. Boles was fired several weeks later. In February 1988, another shouting match occurred in the middle of the newsroom between Jacobson and an assignment desk editor, regarding the previous evening's newscast. In February 1992, Jacobson was reported to have thrown a book at a newsroom staffer's head, causing both him and the staffer to be summoned to the office of the station's general manager. Jacobson later explained to the Tribune that the incident merely was his producer tossing a book over a divider, and Jacobson then "tossing it back." In February 1994—after jumping to WFLD—Jacobson exclaimed, "Oh, fuck you!" to an off-camera director during a live newscast. "I just snapped for an instant," he told the Chicago Sun-Times. "I muttered a swear word under my breath. I exploded. I'm human."

In September 1973, Jacobson was approached by Chicago liberals about running for mayor against Richard J. Daley, but he turned them down. He was solo anchor of the 5pm news for 10 years (from 1976 to 1986), co-anchor of afternoon newscasts from 1986 until September 1991, and co-anchor of the 10pm newscast for 16 years, until he was replaced by Linda MacLennan in 1989.

In 1992, Jacobson scored an exclusive interview with serial killer John Wayne Gacy—an interview that he called "the biggest scoop of my career." Two years later, Jacobson won a lottery to be one of 12 journalists and onlookers to watch Gacy's execution.

On November 13, 2009, Jacobson reunited for one evening with his co-anchor of 20 years earlier, Bill Kurtis, to anchor the WBBM 10 PM news in Chicago while the usual anchor, Rob Johnson, was attending a friend's wedding.

On July 29, 2010, it was announced that Jacobson and Bill Kurtis would anchor the 6 p.m. newscast beginning September 1, 2010.

Jacobson and Kurtis stepped down as news anchors at WBBM in February 2013 when their contracts were not renewed.

=== Career at WFLD-TV ===
Jacobson joined WFLD in 1993 as the station's principal male news anchor, co-anchoring the station's signature 9 p.m. newscast with Robin Robinson. At WFLD, Jacobson was the most popular of the station's news personalities, such as Robin Robinson, Tamron Hall, Byron Harlan, Nancy Pender and Corey McPherrin. Largely because of his influence, WFLD's newscasts have less of a tabloid feel than other FOX stations. However, they are much flashier than the other newscasts in Chicago, especially compared to WBBM during Jacobson's time there.

During much of his career, Walter hosted his own commentary segment entitled "Walter Jacobson in Perspective". The basic concept revolved around Walter's rants, which usually contained either biting social commentary or attacks on great injustices around the Midwest. Walter was never afraid to 'overstep' his boundaries. At times, he would often go after corrupt City of Chicago officials, or lash out at city workers and police officers that did little or no work. Also, Walter would use his segment to take up for the unempowered, helping fix various city based problems in poor neighborhoods, and helping numerous blue-collar workers.

Although Walter achieved success for himself and the city of Chicago, he was often heavily criticized by various traditional and conservative critics. Walter dedicated one of his segments to share hate mail he received over his career. Although most of the letters contained powerful and vulgar tones, which criticized Walter for what many saw as ignorance about gun control, one letter complimented Walter for his hard work, and Walter thanked the writer.

Jacobson often used his air time to tell Chicagoans humorous, though not necessarily newsworthy, anecdotes. He once used at least ten minutes of air time to explain how as a child he lost his baseball glove at Wrigley Field, and how it was recently found and returned to him.

In November 1993, during the key ratings sweeps period, Jacobson showed up on the news wearing a T-shirt to appeal to younger viewers, according to a December 19, 1993, article in the Chicago Sun-Times.

During a commentary in January 1995, Jacobson divulged the home telephone number of Illinois Supreme Court Justice James D. Heiple and urged viewers to use the phone number to tell Heiple what they thought of his ruling in the controversial Baby Richard baby custody case. "I wanted people to call him up and bother him until he did the right thing," Jacobson explained. Local newspaper columnists universally denounced the stunt, and a local bar association referred to the act as "journalistic stalking." Jacobson later conceded that he had gone "over the line."

In September 2004, Jacobson was demoted from his role as WFLD-TV's principal male news anchor when the station chose to install Mark Suppelsa in Jacobson's place as WFLD's 9 p.m. news anchor. Jacobson remained at the station, however, hosting a Sunday morning public-affairs talk show and providing his "Perspective" commentaries during the station's 9 p.m. newscasts.

In February 2006, following Vice-President Dick Cheney's well-publicized hunting mishap, in which he accidentally shot a fellow hunter, Jacobson criticized Cheney for not speaking publicly about the incident. Walter proclaimed in his commentary, "I'm after you, Dick Cheney!" and later "You can't hide in the White House forever, I'll be waiting outside", while flaunting his portable coffee cup at a good moment to show that he would be comfortable and relaxed with a warm drink while outside the White House.

In April 2006, Jacobson announced that he would be leaving WFLD in order to retire, although his departure ultimately was the result of the station choosing not to renew his contract. During every 9pm broadcast before April 30, WFLD aired a special segment to honor Walter and his memorable contributions and accomplishments throughout his career.

=== Career at WLS-AM ===
In September 2013, Jacobson began working as a commentator at WLS-AM radio in Chicago, airing his "Perspective" commentaries every morning at 9:56 a.m. during John Kass' show. The job is the first time Jacobson ever has worked in radio.

== Personal life ==
Jacobson has been married three times. He wed his college sweetheart, Lynn Straus, in 1960. The couple divorced in the 1970s after having two children together, Peter (born March 24, 1965) and Wendy (born July 1963). "God, can you imagine naming kids Peter and Wendy? I'd never even read 'Peter Pan,'" Jacobson told the Chicago Tribune in a profile in 1984.

In 1982, Jacobson married Diane Dybsky, a former schoolteacher. They later divorced, after having two daughters, Julia and Genevieve. In March 1995, Jacobson married advertising executive Susan G. "Susie" Jacobson. She died in 2019.

Walter Jacobson's son, Peter Jacobson, is an actor who has appeared in the television programs Will & Grace, Law & Order, and House and films like Good Night, and Good Luck, Transformers and Failure to Launch. Peter Jacobson also has done stage work in New York City.

== Legal problems ==
In February 1977, Jacobson failed to make WBBM's 10 p.m. newscast because he was being booked at a police station, charged with making an illegal left turn and driving on a suspended license. A few weeks later, Jacobson was pulled over and charged with driving at night with defective headlights.

In a landmark case in media law, Jacobson and WBBM's owner, CBS, were found guilty by a federal jury in Chicago in November 1985 of libeling the Brown & Williamson tobacco company in a November 1981 exposé in which Jacobson accused the cigarette manufacturer of marketing cigarettes to children and teens. The next month, the jury awarded Brown & Williamson $5.1 million, with Jacobson personally liable for $50,000. An appeals court ultimately cut the award to $3 million, but let Jacobson's share stand. "I feel some outrage, some fury as well as disappointment. I am outraged at the cigarette industry for trying to intimidate the press. I don't feel intimidated," Jacobson told the Chicago Tribune in an article that appeared on December 6, 1985.

In September 1997, Jacobson was arrested and charged with grabbing a restaurant owner in Chicago's Humboldt Park neighborhood who wouldn't answer his questions about homeless people interfering with businesses in the neighborhood. Jacobson ultimately was acquitted of misdemeanor battery, trespass and disorderly conduct charges a few months later.

In May 2004, Jacobson was arrested in Chicago's Lincoln Park neighborhood and charged with driving under the influence, running a stop sign, invalid registration and obstructing traffic after he allegedly double-parked his 2004 Saab outside a Lincoln Park pizzeria and was seen by police "stumbling" out of the shop. Jacobson reportedly was advised by an officer not to drive his car pending a sobriety test, but he went ahead and did so anyway, and after several blocks was pulled over by officers. Jacobson ultimately passed the Breathalyzer test, and the DUI charge was dropped, just four days before his induction into the Chicago Journalism Hall of Fame. Jacobson ultimately pleaded guilty to negligent driving, obstruction of traffic and running a stop sign, and he was sentenced to four months' supervision and was fined $450. He also agreed to undergo evaluation of his use of alcohol. After the incident, Jacobson responded—with his Perspective commentary—on Fox News, claiming he was pulled over by an unmarked car full of people in baseball caps, not policemen. He later went on to say that he was "mishandled" by the police.

On June 18, 2008, Jacobson was arrested near his home in Chicago's Lincoln Park neighborhood for DUI charges after failing a field sobriety and Breathalyzer test. In April 2009, Jacobson pleaded guilty and received supervision, according to Cook County records and local bloggers.

== Injuries ==
In late January 1993, Jacobson needed stitches from the emergency room at Northwestern Memorial Hospital after a fall during a late-night visit to the China Club nightclub in Chicago, where he was watching the Village People perform, according to a February 8, 1993, article in the Chicago Sun-Times.

In January 1995, while disguised as a homeless man for a February sweeps piece, Jacobson tripped on a concrete pillar and fell flat on his face, suffering cuts and bruises on his chin and under one eye, according to a January 31, 1995 article in the Chicago Sun-Times. "I saw stars for a minute or two," Jacobson told the paper.

In November 2002, Jacobson slipped on a pumpkin on his front steps and fractured several ribs, according to a November 7, 2002 article in the Chicago Sun-Times.

== Acting career ==
Jacobson made a cameo appearance as himself in 1990 in CBS' short-lived sitcom, Uncle Buck, which was based on the movie of the same name. The episode aired on October 1, 1990.

== Awards ==
Jacobson has received several prestigious awards for his commentary, anchoring, and reporting skills. The Chicago Chapter of the National Academy of Television Arts and Sciences recognized his commentaries with Emmy Awards. In fact, Jacobson won Chicago Emmy awards for 10 straight years—1974 until 1983—for his commentaries. In 1985, a Washington Journalism Review poll named Jacobson best local anchor in the United States. In 1988, he received his fifth Peter Lisagor Award, his third for "best commentary." During the 1980s, the duPont-Columbia judges honored him twice for his work at WBBM-TV—once for his commentaries and once for best local election coverage in the United States. Jacobson's notable WBBM-TV specials and programs included the Emmy Award-winning Walter Jacobson's Journal: China and Studebaker: Less Than They Promised, which received a Peabody Award.

Jacobson's most infamous news story occurred at WBBM-TV in February 1991, just two years before he switched to WFLD-TV. Wearing a fake beard, Jacobson dressed up as a homeless person and lived on the streets of Chicago for 48 hours, visiting Lower Wacker Drive, Clarendon Park, the corner of Halsted and Addison Streets, and the corner across the street from the Lincoln Park townhouse of his former anchor partner, Bill Kurtis. He had a hidden camera and recorded what he experienced in a series he dubbed "Mean Street Diary." Critics at the city's newspapers roundly mocked Jacobson for the stunt. "It was amazing that he was able to transform an issue of such inherent sorrow and desperation into something that could yield so many moments of great, if unintended, humor," wrote Rick Kogan in the Chicago Tribune.

In January 1995 at WFLD, Jacobson reprised his role as a homeless man for the hidden cameras.

== Producers ==
Throughout his career, Jacobson employed many producers who went on to have successful journalism or media careers in their own right. These include:

- Joe Kolina (now senior executive producer at WMAQ-TV)
- Joseph Novak
- Michael Radutzky (later became producer for Ed Bradley at 60 Minutes)
- John Rooney
- Kevin McGee
- John Eisendrath (now a TV show creator)
- Roe Conn (a former highly rated talk show host for Chicago's WGN-AM - currently working for the Cook County Sheriff.)
- Jim Edwards (later a radio host using the pseudonym Jake Hartford, died 2013)
- Michael Harvey (now a documentary producer who has worked for the production company owned by Bill Kurtis)
- Phil Hayes (later an on-air reporter at WFLD-TV)
- Jason Kravarik (now a TV news reporter)
