= Worthen Bank Building =

- U.S. National Register of Historic Places
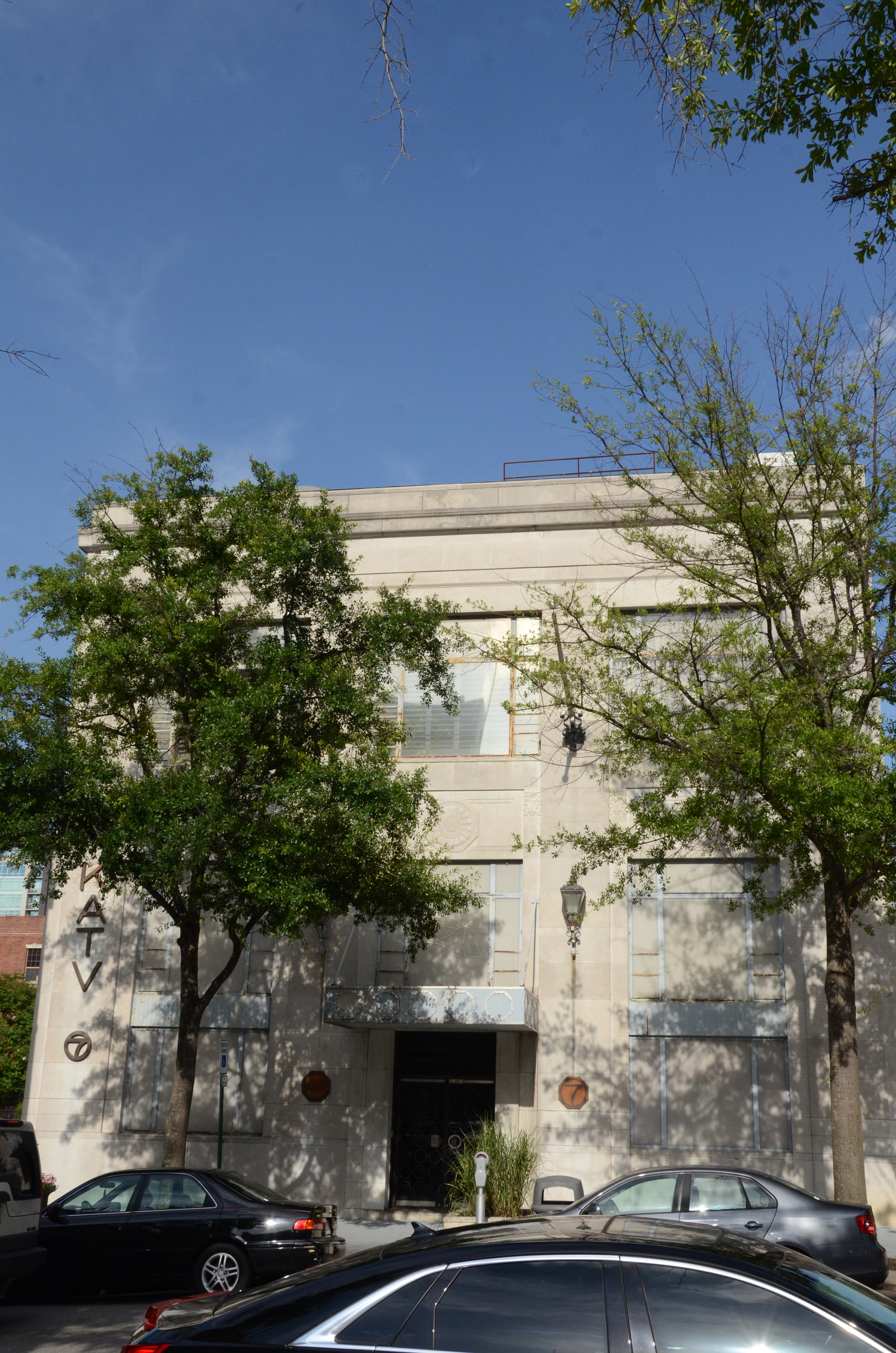

- Location within Arkansas Location within the United States
- Location: 401 Main St., Little Rock, Arkansas
- Coordinates: 34°44′41″N 92°16′13″W
- Area: less than one acre
- Built: 1928
- Architect: George R. Mann
- Architectural style: Classical Revival
- MPS: Little Rock Main Street MRA
- NRHP reference No.: 86003125
- Added to NRHP: November 13, 1986

The Worthen Bank Building is a historic commercial building at 401 Main Street in downtown Little Rock, Arkansas. It is a two-story masonry structure with neoclassical and Art Deco lines. It has a steel frame and is faced in limestone. Three bays of three-part windows stand on the second floor, and two flank the center entry. The building was constructed in 1928 for the Worthen Bank, founded in 1877 (later merged into St. Louis-based Boatmen's Bancshares, itself integrated into Bank of America), and was designed by George R. Mann, a prominent local architect otherwise known for his design of the Arkansas State Capitol. Annexes and a parking garage were added in 1952 and 1962, along with some modernization of the 1928 building.

In 1969, the complex was acquired by local ABC television network affiliate KATV (channel 7), which converted it into studios, as Worthern relocated to a new skyscraper nearby; the complex then became the KATV Building, with the monicker applied on the facade of the 1954 annex and other details denoting the building's new use, including decorative iron grating in the entryway of the 1928 building formed in the station's Circle 7 logo.

KATV vacated the Worthen complex in January 2023 for a newer building in the Riverdale section, as it had become too large and outdated for a modern television station and exterior maintenance had been deferred for years, even before the station's acquisition by Sinclair Broadcasting Group, which saw a modern and streamlined broadcast facility for the station as a priority. The 1928 portion of the building is expected to be restored to its original state, with the newer 1950s addition and attached parking garage to be torn down as part a new technology park development.

The original 1928 building was listed on the National Register of Historic Places in 1986.

== See also ==
- National Register of Historic Places listings in Little Rock, Arkansas
