= Eells =

Eells is a surname. Notable people with the surname include:

- Cushing Eells (1810–1893), American Congregational church missionary, farmer and teacher
- Elsie Spicer Eells (1880–1963), American folklorist
- Harry Eells (1881–1940), American baseball player
- James Eells (1926–2007), American mathematician
- Paul Eells (1935–2006), American sportscaster
- Richard Eells (1800-1846), American abolitionist and physician from Illinois
- Samuel Eells (1810–1842), American lawyer, philosopher, essayist and orator

This surname is a very common surname of many of the members of the Followers of Christ.
