= Phil Ponce =

American journalist and television presenter

- Born: September 26, 1949 (age 76); McAllen, Texas, U.S.
- Education: Bishop Noll Institute; Indiana University Bloomington (B.A.); University of Michigan (J.D.)
- Occupation: Television journalist
- Years active: 1982–present
- Known for: Host of Chicago Tonight (since 1999)
- Spouse: Ann Ponce (present)

Phil Ponce (born September 26, 1949) is a retired American journalist and television anchor. Ponce is notable as the former, long-time host of "Chicago Tonight", a weekly television magazine of news and culture on WTTW, Chicago's public television station.

== Early life ==
Ponce was born on 1949 in McAllen, Texas, but was raised in East Chicago, Indiana. He graduated from Bishop Noll Institute in Hammond, Indiana. He then attended Indiana University Bloomington and received a B.A. in English in 1971. In 1974 he received a Juris Doctor from the University of Michigan.

Ponce's parents both were steelworkers. During college, Ponce worked as a steelworker during summers.

== Career ==
Ponce began his career as a lawyer. He practiced law for six years before going into broadcasting.

His first job in broadcasting was as a weekend reporter for the ABC affiliate in Indianapolis.

In 1982, he joined the Chicago CBS station WBBM-TV as a reporter. Ponce left WBBM-TV in late 1991 to take a position as manager of international communications for the telecommunications company Ameritech Corporation.

In 1992, Ponce began his career at WTTW11 as a correspondent for Chicago Tonight — a position he held until 1997 when he left to become one of Jim Lehrer's supporting anchors on the national PBS show, The News Hour with Jim Lehrer. He returned to Chicago two years later as the successor to long-time Chicago Tonight host, John Callaway. As host, Ponce moderated political debates including those for the presidency, the U.S. Senate, the governorship, and mayor of Chicago. Ponce taught interviewing at Loyola University Chicago where he was the university's distinguished journalist in residence.

He has received numerous awards for his work including Alpha Sigma Nu, the Jesuit honor society, Illinois Journalist of the Year, the Studs Terkel Award and the Distinguished Alumni Award from the Indiana University College of Arts and Sciences.

In late 2017, Ponce announced that he would reduce his workload to three days a week during 2018 and two days a week in 2019. He retired in 2021.

== Personal life ==
Ponce's wife, Ann Ponce, is a Chicago portrait and landscape artist.

Ponce's daughter, Maria Ponce, is a photographer in Chicago. Ponce also has two sons. Dan Ponce is the founder of the a cappella group, Straight No Chaser, and was a television reporter with ABC7 (WLS-TV) in Chicago for three years until leaving in January 2009. Dan is currently a morning anchor at WGN Ch. 9. His other son, Anthony Ponce, was a television reporter with NBC5 (WMAQ-TV), and is now an anchor/reporter at WFLD Ch. 32, also in Chicago.

Ponce lives in Chicago's northern suburbs.
