= Gas rebate credit cards =

Gas rebate credit cards or gas cashback cards became popular in the United States in the wake of the 2000s energy crisis and the rising price of gasoline.

== Rebate concept ==
Shell is credited for introducing the gas rebate card in 1992 through the launch of the first MasterCard that came with 3 percent rebate. A year later, the rebate was increased to 5 percent on gas bought at its stations. The appeal of a gas rebate credit card is that cardholders obtain a sure percent of the sum they consume on gasoline each month in the form of a rebate check at the end of the year. It works similarly to a cashback discount recognition card with the exception that the gasoline discount is frequently applied each month, rather than each year, which makes the savings easier to view for most consumers. Companies provide an average of 3% APR on new gas rebate credit cards.

== Long-term contract offers ==
- In July 2009, Hyundai offered its customers a choice between $1.49 a gallon for a year or $1,000 in cash.
- In May 2008, Chrysler offered $2.99 per gallon for 3 years.

== Fraud and theft at the gas pumps ==
Concerns over fraud have led credit card companies to limit the amount of gasoline a consumer can take during pay at the pump transactions. One of the more famous cases of gas credit card usage was when television anchor Anne Pressly was attacked and then had her credit card used minutes later.

== Glitches at the gas pumps ==
Glitches can also compromise consumers such as the case in July 2009, where Josh Muszynski from New Hampshire, got charged $23 quadrillion dollars by Bank of America and Visa due to a credit card glitch.

== See also ==
- Cashback reward program
