= Kate Sullivan =

American television journalist (born 1976)

- Born: Mary Catherine Elizabeth Sullivan
- Education: University of Notre Dame
- Occupations: News anchor Journalist, Producer, TV Host
- Television: WSBT-TV; KATV; WCBS-TV; WBBM-TV; APT; PBS; Create
- Spouse: Michael Tillman

Mary-Catherine Elizabeth Sullivan is an American television show host, producer, and television news anchor. She was a co-anchor of the evening news for WBBM-TV in Chicago with Rob Johnson from September 2010 to September 2015. She also anchored the morning and noon news at WCBS-TV in New York (2006–2010).

== Early life and education ==
Sullivan is from Lakeville, Massachusetts, and graduated cum laude from the University of Notre Dame.

== Career ==
Sullivan began her journalistic career in the Midwest at the CBS affiliate WSBT-TV in South Bend, Indiana, where she started as an intern and was promoted to a general assignment reporter. In 2000, she joined KATV, the Allbritton Communications Company owned ABC-affiliated television station in Little Rock, Arkansas, as a general assignment reporter.

In 2002, she was promoted to anchor Live at Five at KATV and, in 2003, she also added Channel 7 News at 6 p.m. and Channel 7 News Nightside to her anchoring duties. While at KATV, Kate reported on 9/11 from Ground Zero in New York and presented stories about Arkansans who had lost loved ones during the tragedy. She covered the presidential run of General Wesley Clark and the opening of the Clinton Presidential Library which won the station a regional Emmy award. She also reported a series of stories from Honduras on the charitable work of the Arkansas-based non-profit Heifer International.

Sullivan joined the CBS team in 2006 and anchored CBS 2 News This Morning at WCBS-TV in New York. In addition to anchoring CBS 2 News This Morning with Maurice DuBois and CBS 2 News at Noon, she co-hosted and filled in as the newsreader at CBS' The Saturday Early Show with Chris Wragge, Lonnie Quinn, and Erica Hill.

In September 2010, Sullivan joined WBBM-TV in Chicago, where she worked until September 2015.

In 2018, Sullivan became the executive producer and host of To Dine For with Kate Sullivan on American Public Television, PBS and Create.

== Awards ==
Sullivan was named one of the Top 30 Irish Americans in Media by IrishCentral.com in 2010. While a news anchor, she won awards including an Emmy Award and the Associated Press First Place Award for Breaking News.

== Personal life ==
Sullivan is married to Michael Tillman. Their first child, a son, was born in 2014.
