= CBS 17 =

CBS 17 may refer to one of the following television stations in the United States:

== Currently affiliates ==
- KBMY-DT2 in Bismarck–Mandan, North Dakota
- KSWL-LD in Lake Charles, Louisiana
- WNCN in Raleigh–Durham, North Carolina
- WXVT-LD in Cleveland, Mississippi

== Formerly affiliated ==
- KJTV/KPWR (now KGET-TV) in Bakersfield, California (1974–1984)
- KRTV in Little Rock, Arkansas (1953–1954; is now defunct)
- KVIQ-LD in Eureka, California (2008–2017)
- WVXF in Charlotte Amalie, U.S. Virgin Islands (2001–2009)
