= Jake Hartford =

American radio host

Jake Hartford (born Jim Edwards, December 1, 1949 – January 12, 2013), was a talk radio host who anchored the 9-11 a.m. slot on 89 WLS with Chicago Tribune columnist John Kass. Hartford had been a personality on WLS-AM 890 since 1991 with a regular Saturday morning show called "Awake with Jake," as well as performing various fill-in duties. Due to a management shuffle he was laid off and briefly moved to WCPT-AM (820) from 2008 to 2010, but returned to WLS-AM 890 where he had been promoted to mid-days just prior to his death.

== Style ==
Hartford was most infamous for giving callers the wrong instructions to change their clocks during Daylight Saving Time shifts. Every May he conducted the "Gizzy Awards," named after former Chicago newscaster Giselle Fernández, honoring the most popular Chicago television news personalities.

In 2002, Hartford used his influence as a radio personality to affect the selection of the Official Fish of Chicago. He suggested that his listeners cast an online vote for the Longnose dace. As a result of the campaign, the longnose dace came from distant obscurity to winning the contest.

== Radio History ==
Jake worked in Chicago television news, including producing segments for Walter Jacobson. He started at WLS-AM in September 1989, known then as "Jake the Travel Guy," working alongside Roe Conn. Jake then began as a solo host on March 16, 1991.

Hartford was let go in a series of layoffs by new WLS-AM owner Citadel Broadcasting on February 29, 2008. In commenting on his release, Hartford said "I spent nearly 20 years building a brand there, and it was over in a less than a one-minute phone call without even a 'thanks.' And it's not like the ratings weren't good."

Another upper management shuffle in early 2010 at WLS-AM resulted in reversing previous lay-offs, one of which included bringing Hartford back.

After the retirement of longtime WLS morning show hosts Don Wade and Roma in September 2012, Hartford teamed up with Chicago Tribune columnist John Kass to host the 9-11 a.m. hours, airing where fill-in morning hosts Bruce Wolf and Dan Proft formerly aired. The change became permanent in December 2012.

== Personal ==
Jake made his home at "Green Jakres" in Lockport, Illinois, with his wife Marsha (beauty pageant winner Miss Dill Pickle 1982) and two sons Jameson and Graham.

Hartford's real name was Jim Edwards. While working for WBBM-TV, he was forced to adopt a radio pseudonym, which he chose by abbreviating the last name of his longtime boss, Walter Jacobson as the first name of his pseudonym - and the name of one of Jim's family's dogs, 'Hartford'.

He died of a massive heart attack at his home in Lockport, IL. He was 63 years old.
