= Dan Ponce =

American television journalist (born 1976)

Dan Ponce (born December 7, 1976, in Denver, Colorado) is an American television journalist for WGN-TV, radio talk show host on WLS/890 and founder of the a cappella group Straight No Chaser.

== Early life ==
Dan Ponce was born on December 7th, 1976 in Denver, Colorado to parents Ann and Phil Ponce. His father is Phil Ponce, a Chicago television journalist who hosts Chicago Tonight. He was raised in Wilmette, Illinois. Growing up, Dan was a baritone singer, as well as being a good whistler, being able to whistle and hum a song at the same time and switch between the two while making a song. His brother Anthony Ponce also can do this skill.

Ponce attended New Trier Township High School in Winnetka, Illinois. As of 2017, he lived in Glencoe, Illinois after living in Irving Park in Chicago.

== Career and background ==
At Indiana University Bloomington in Bloomington, Indiana, Ponce was the founder of the a cappella group Straight No Chaser in 1996. A 1998 performance went viral on YouTube when it was a new site in 2007. After graduating with his bachelor's degree from Indiana University, Ponce went and got his masters in journalism degree from the Medill School of Journalism at Northwestern University in Evanston, Illinois.

Ponce's TV career began in 2005 when he was hired at WILX-TV in Lansing, Michigan, as a reporter and weekend anchor. In 2006, Dan joined ABC-owned WLS-TV (channel 7) in Chicago as a general assignment reporter.

In 2009, after Straight No Chaser's album "Holiday Spirits" went to #1 on iTunes and Amazon, Ponce decided to leave ABC and join the group full-time. SNC went on to perform hundreds of concerts throughout the country and record three more albums on the Atlantic Records label. The group's televised concert series "Live in New York" (produced by WTTW) aired on PBS stations coast to coast. Ponce later came back to a TV career and was hired by WGN-TV {Channel 9}.
