= Linda MacLennan =

Linda S. MacLennan (born May 25, 1956) is a former television news anchor and reporter who spent the majority of her career with WBBM-TV in Chicago, Illinois.

== Early life and education ==
Born in Toronto, Ontario, Canada, MacLennan is the daughter of a Canadian father and an American mother. She earned a degree from Carleton University in Ottawa, Ontario.

== Professional career ==
MacLennan originally had planned to pursue a career in print journalism but switched to broadcasting after a college internship at CJOH-TV in Ottawa, Ontario. MacLennan co-anchored Canada AM on CTV from 1985 to 1987.

In 1986, MacLennan was struck by a policeman on a motorcycle in Toronto and developed a blood clot on the brain. After doctors failed in their efforts to dissolve the blood clot with drugs, they operated on her at substantial risk to her. She eventually made a full recovery.

In March 1987, MacLennan left CTV to join WBBM-TV in Chicago as a reporter and late afternoon co-anchor. In April 1989, MacLennan became WBBM-TV's 10 p.m. co-anchor, replacing Walter Jacobson in the anchor chair alongside Bill Kurtis. Jacobson had been the station's 10 p.m. co-anchor since 1973.

In 1995, Kurtis stepped down as WBBM's 10 p.m. co-anchor, and Lester Holt was promoted to replace Kurtis alongside MacLennan.

In 1996, MacLennan appeared on the pilot episode of Early Edition as a newscaster.

In February 2000, MacLennan was demoted as WBBM's 10 p.m. co-anchor as both she and Holt were demoted in favor of a solo anchor experiment involving Carol Marin. After station bosses pulled the plug on Marin as solo anchor in October 2000, WBBM then made MacLennan an interim 10 p.m. co-anchor, alongside David Kerley. However, in December 2000, WBBM hired Tracy Townsend as a 10 p.m. co-anchor alongside Kerley, and MacLennan shifted to being a solo 11 a.m. news anchor (replacing Jay Levine and Mary Ann Childers) and a 4:30 p.m. co-anchor alongside Vince Gerasole. In 2001, MacLennan got a co-anchor for the 11 a.m. newscast, Michael Ayala.

In April 2002, MacLennan again returned to co-anchoring the 10 p.m. news, this time supplanting Townsend alongside the newly hired Antonio Mora.

With a new general manager, Joe Ahern, on board, MacLennan abruptly took a contract buyout from WBBM in February 2003.

As of June 2017, MacLennan became a part-time anchor for WBBM-AM in Chicago.

== Personal ==
In August 1992, MacLennan married Chicago attorney David Rammelt. They have three children: Taylor Albert, Carson Charles and Charlotte Grace Nelson Rammelt. The couple divorced in 2014. She lives in Kenilworth, Illinois.

In October 2008, MacLennan was knocked to the ground after confronting a man suspected of breaking into cars in the parking lot of a Skokie, Illinois shopping mall, including her own vehicle.
