= John Coughlin (weatherman) =

John Coughlin (September 3, 1925 – February 17, 2001) was a longtime meteorologist for WBBM-TV in Chicago, during the station's No. 1 position in the television news market in Chicago in the 1970s.

== Early life and education ==
Born and raised in Chicago, Coughlin served two years of combat during World War II. He then earned a bachelor's degree in liberal arts from Northwestern University in 1952.

== Professional career ==
Coughlin's first job was working for a small radio station in Alton, Illinois, where he lived in a dingy boarding house with the station's other disc jockeys. After about a year in Alton, Coughlin worked for a variety of radio stations in Chicago. He joined WBBM-TV in 1953, working mostly on children's programs.

In 1969, Coughlin was pressed into service as a weatherman after one of the station's meteorologists, Roy Allred, took ill just before a broadcast. Later, after Allred quit, Coughlin was asked to become the station's interim meteorologist, even though by his own admission, he knew nothing about the subject. No replacement ever was found, however, and after eight months of filling in, Coughlin was given the job on a full-time basis. Coughlin then began studying meteorology—even hiring a tutor from the University of Chicago.

In July 1976, WBBM demoted Coughlin, who by that point was the station's top weather forecaster, to be a staff announcer and replaced him with part-time actor Tom Alderman, who also had been a public relations professional for then-Illinois Gov. Dan Walker. The station received more than 10,000 letters of protest from viewers, and eventually restored Coughlin in February 1977 to his previous job and apologized on the air.

Coughlin retired from WBBM-TV in August 1989. "I cannot think of a thing that I would have done differently," Coughlin told the Chicago Tribune at the time of his retirement. "I've been so lucky. I was at the right place at the right time several times in my life. I had no idea I'd be the weatherman when I started out."

== Death ==
Coughlin collapsed and died at his retirement home in Evanston, Illinois on February 17, 2001. He was 75.

== Personal ==
Coughlin never married. Upon his death, he was survived by three sisters.
