= Anne State =

American journalist

Anne M. State (born May 2, 1969) is an American television news anchor, currently weeknight anchor for KGTV, the ABC station in San Diego, California. State was formerly at KOIN-TV, the CBS affiliate in Portland, Oregon from July 2014 to April 2015, and was one of the two principal news anchors at WBBM-TV in Chicago from 2008 to 2010.

== Early life and education ==
State grew up in southern California and earned a bachelor's degree from the University of California, San Diego.

In 1994, State backpacked around the world.

== Professional career ==
State began her journalism career as a reporter and fill-in anchor at KTKA-TV in Topeka, Kansas. She then worked from 1998 until 2000 as a morning anchor and general assignment reporter at KCCI-TV in Des Moines, Iowa. From 2000 to 2002, State worked as a weekend morning anchor and reporter at KMOV-TV in St. Louis, Missouri. In 2002, she joined KNSD-TV in San Diego where she worked as a reporter.

In 2008, State joined WBBM-TV as the co-anchor of the station's 5 pm, 6 p.m. and 10 p.m. newscasts. On March 26, 2010, State's contract was not renewed, making her a free agent.

She joined WITI-TV Fox 6 in Milwaukee in October 2010 as a weeknight co-anchor. In July 2014 she became the nightly news anchor for KOIN in Portland, Oregon. During the evening newscast April 14, 2015, State's co-anchor announced that she had stepped down from her position at KOIN, effective immediately, to care for her ailing parents.

== Personal ==
State holds dual U.S. and Irish citizenship. She also has spent time living and working in London, England and Sydney. In addition, State has hiked in the Himalayas.
