= Mike Parker (reporter) =

Michael J. Fishel (September 27, 1943 – November 4, 2018), known professionally as Mike Parker, was a news anchor and reporter for WBBM-TV in Chicago.

== Early life and education ==
A native of Rock Island, Illinois, Parker earned a degree from Los Angeles City College.

== Professional career ==
Parker worked as the news director and as a reporter for KFI-AM radio in Los Angeles from 1969 until 1972. He also worked as an anchor, investigative reporter and general assignment reporter at KNXT (now KCBS-TV) in Los Angeles, from 1977 until 1980.

In January 1980, Parker joined WBBM-TV in Chicago as a weekend news anchor and weekday general assignment reporter. He remained at WBBM-TV until 1985, when he chose not to renew his contract in order to join his wife, Mary Nissenson, who was working as a reporter for WABC-TV in New York. Parker then joined WABC himself as a general assignment reporter, remaining in New York until late 1986, when he returned to WBBM-TV as a weekend anchor. In 1987, Nissenson returned to Chicago, taking a reporting and substitute anchor job at WBBM-TV.

In 1992, Parker was demoted as weekend news anchor and was replaced by Jay Levine, and filled in as a news anchor where needed. However, the bulk of his job involved being one of WBBM's star reporters, including on the ill-fated non-tabloid 10 p.m. newscast anchored by Carol Marin that ran for nine months in 2000.

Parker was at WBBM-TV longer than any other full-time on-air personality. He retired from the station on May 31, 2016.

== Personal and death ==
Parker was married and had two children in Los Angeles, when he began his relationship with his second wife, the television news anchor and reporter, Mary Nissenson. They divorced in 1989. Parker married his third wife, Marian Ambrose, in 1992. They lived in the Beverly neighborhood on Chicago's South Side. Parker was off the air for an extended period in 2001 after undergoing coronary bypass surgery and related complications. He eventually made a full recovery.

Parker died on November 4, 2018, at the age of 75.
