= Daily Calumet =

Chicago newspaper (1881–1987)

The Daily Calumet was a Chicago newspaper that existed from 1881 until the late 1980s, when it was superseded by the Daily Southtown. Once billed as "the Nation's Oldest Daily Community Newspaper", it was popular among blue-collar workers in Chicago's South Side. It was purchased by Pulitzer Community Newspapers, a Pulitzer Publishing Company subsidiary, in 1987. At the time, it had a circulation of 10,500.

== History ==
The Daily Calumet was located at 9120 S. Baltimore Ave., Chicago, in the South Chicago neighborhood on the city's Southeast Side. Depending on the delineation of ward boundaries, it was either in the 7th or 10th Ward.

It served the communities within the city of South Chicago, South Shore, Irondale/Slag Valley, South Deering, the East Side and Hegewisch as well as the neighboring suburbs of Calumet City and Burnham.

Affectionately known as "The Cal" to generations of readers, the newspaper covered only topics of local interest and it was not until its final years that it used any wire service copy. In the early 1980s, The Daily Calumet subscribed to the United Press International service to augment the copy produced by its staff of reporters, photographers and correspondents. Reporting areas, or "beats" were divided into four areas of responsibility on The Daily Calumet.

The police beat, known internally as the "cops and courts" beat, was basically focused on news from the 4th District of the Chicago Police Department. The detective bureau covered by The Daily Calumet was Area 2, which comprised districts 3 (Grand Crossing), 4 (South Chicago) 6 (Gresham) and 22 (Morgan Park).

The most sensational police coverage done by The Daily Calumet concerned the 1966 murders of eight student nurses by drifter Richard Speck. The women were killed in an apartment rented by South Chicago Community Hospital on East 100th Street. Photographers and reporters from The Daily Calumet were the first media on the scene and were allowed unparalleled access to the homicide scene. The newspaper also extensively reported and photographed the October 30, 1972 collision between two Illinois Central commuter trains, which originated from the IC's 91st Street station in South Chicago. The wreck, which killed 45 people and injured 332, remains the worst commuter rail crash in Chicago's history, and carried a number of victims from the newspaper's coverage area.

The labor beat, which covered both the unions and the businesses of the Southeast Side, concentrated heavily on the steel and auto industries that made up the bulk of the local manufacturing employers. Among the largest of these were the South Works of United States Steel, Republic (later LTV) Steel, Wisconsin Steel, the Chicago Assembly Plant of Ford Motor Company and related suppliers to the above industries. The most significant coverage on the labor beat was during the 1937 Memorial Day Massacre when Chicago police shot down several striking workers at the Republic Steel plant on Avenue O.

The education beat covered numerous parochial and public schools on the Southeast Side. The high schools covered by The Daily Calumet included Washington High School, Bowen High School, Hirsch High School and St. Francis De Sales High School operated by the Archdiocese of Chicago.

The political beat covered both the 7th Ward and 10th Ward organizations. As part of its coverage, the beat reporter would attend Chicago City Council meetings. The beat also covered the state house and senate districts within the Southeast Side area and the 2nd Congressional District of the U.S. House. Some of the most intense political reporting came during the administration of Chicago Mayor Harold Washington, whose primary nemesis on the council floor was Ald. Edward Vrdolyak, the 10th Ward alderman. Vrdolyak led the floor opposition to Washington during the stormy time known as "Council Wars," a play on words from the popular "Star Wars" films, when the Washington bloc found itself at odds and often outnumbered or outmaneuvered by Vrdolyak and his allies.

The environment beat was created during the turn of the 1980s, when Waste Management Corp. tried unsuccessfully to create a nature preserve in Burnham, Illinois, to mitigate a planned expansion of its CID Landfill near 130th Street and the Calumet (Bishop Ford) Expressway, and the Illinois Environmental Protection Agency initiated legal actions against several small operating and closed landfills concentrated in a heavily industrialized area near Torrence Avenue.

In addition to these "beats," reporters were encouraged to produce enterprise stories on any neighborhood subject of their choice. The Daily Calumet also had a photo department with two full-time staffers and several stringers; two full-time sports personnel and a full-time Lifestyles editor and an assistant.

As the neighborhood demographics changed, The Daily Calumet added a Spanish language page known as "Fin de Semana" or "Weekend" which served the growing Latino market.

== Legacy ==
In approximately 1980, The Daily Calumet was sold by its owners, Panax Publishing Co., to a British-owned group from Liverpool. After several years, the British group sold the paper to Pulitzer, which owned The Daily Southtown newspaper which served Chicago's Southwest Side. After about two years of operation by Pulitzer, The Daily Calumet nameplate was phased out and replaced by The Daily Southtown, which opened a bureau in a building owned by The Daily Calumet in south suburban Lansing, Ill. at 18127 William St. The office was closed and The Daily Southtown effectively withdrew from the southeastern Chicago market when its product failed to catch on with the local population.

The Daily Calumet building at 9120 S. Baltimore Avenue in Chicago was donated to the South Chicago YMCA. After a structural analysis determined the building was not safe, it was razed to expand the YMCA parking area. The Lansing building was sold, was razed and is now the site of a medical building.

== Notable people ==
- John Kass, a columnist who appeared daily on page 2 of the Chicago Tribune for decades, got his start in journalism at The Daily Calumet.
