= Mary Nissenson =

American journalist (1952–2017)

Mary Nissenson (April 1952 – October 23, 2017) was an American television journalist, entrepreneur, social activist and university instructor.

== Early life and education ==
A summa cum laude graduate of Vassar College in 1974, Nissenson received her J.D. degree from the University of Chicago Law School in 1977. She was the first woman elected president of the law students' association in the institution's history.

== Broadcast journalism career ==
After a brief practice as a corporate litigator with the Chicago firm of Hopkins & Sutter, Nissenson was hired as chief investigator of the consumer affairs unit (Factfinder) at WBBM-TV Chicago. She received her first Emmy Award eight months later for her investigative reports into violations of child labor laws—a series also honored with a Silver Gavel Award from the American Bar Association in 1979,Jacob Scher Award for investigative reporting, and a Peter Lisagor Award.

In 1980, Nissenson was hired as a reporter/documentarian for WTVJ-Miami. Shortly after, she went to Israel and Poland to produce Pages of Testimony, which documented a Holocaust survivor's return to Auschwitz and the donation of the Auschwitz Album, a valuable pictorial record of the Holocaust, to the Yad Vashem Museum in Jerusalem.

While in Warsaw, Nissenson was asked by CBS Network News to cover Lech Wałęsa's Solidarity Movement and ensuing labor strikes which led to the democratization of Poland. Her series of reports, Poland: Changing Nation, received a George Foster Peabody Award (television's equivalent of the Pulitzer Prize) just two months after she had begun her first full-time on-air reporting job.

Nissenson was hired by NBC Network News in 1982, where, in addition to being a correspondent on three presidential campaigns, she sometimes guest-anchored on Today, NBC News at Sunrise, NBC News Overnight and NBC News Digest. She left the network in 1985 to report and anchor for WABC-TV in New York.

From 1987 until 1988, Nissenson worked as a reporter at WBBM-TV in Chicago. In an interview with Chicago Sun-Times TV columnist Robert Feder, Nissenson denied that she resigned from the station in May 1988 because she was unable to obtain an anchor slot at the station. "I simply want to be my own person," she told Feder.

== Career as an entrepreneur ==
In 1988, Nissenson formed Foresight Communications, Inc. (FCI). FCI's worked with Fortune 500 companies to divert monies from traditional marketing and advertising to public service ventures, which earned her a recognition as one of the "Socially Responsible Entrepreneurs of the Year" by INC Magazine. She was also inducted into the Entrepreneurship Hall of Fame. During this period, she and husband Bill Scheer (now deceased), founded Assignment Desk, Inc. the first worldwide fully computerized booking agency for videographers.

Nissenson's company, Foresight Communications, Inc., served as principal architect (Agency of Record) for National Breast Cancer Awareness Month for its first decade.

== Plastic surgery mishap ==
In 1995, a plastic surgery mishap left Nissenson homebound and disabled with an incurable pain condition, then known as cranial reflex sympathetic dystrophy. It ranked alongside terminal bone cancer as one of the most painful conditions in the world. The mishap was featured on The Oprah Winfrey Show, in countless newspapers and magazines, and several documentaries, including America the Beautiful (2007). She spent most of the next 14 years bedridden. During this period, Nissenson founded the Triumph Over Pain Foundation, one of the first pain patient advocacy groups in the country. She also wrote a column to offer advice and encouragement to other pain patients.

In addition, Nissenson became a self-taught glass artisan and jewelry designer. She opened the Bali Muse gallery in Chicago, whose revenues supported the work of her pain foundation.

Left by her husband and dropped by her insurance company, Nissenson lost her home and life savings, paying for medical expenses which cost millions of dollars. In 2007, she moved to Kauai in the hopes of healing and regaining her strength.

== Later years ==
Nissenson spent the final years of her life living in Sausalito, California, where she was an instructor of graduate multi-media at San Francisco's Academy of Art University. She also formed Global Gravitas, Inc., a 501(c)(3) organization, which specializes in strategic planning for international peace summits and global healthcare campaigns. Among their current projects are: A.M.E.N. (the first global campaign to fight MRSA) in cooperation with the President of the US Federation for Middle East Peace, and OMG (Obesity Must Go) a nationwide campaign to combat childhood obesity, in support of First Lady Michelle Obama's "Let's Move" efforts.

Nissenson died of septic shock on October 23, 2017.

== Personal life ==
Nissenson was married first to a lawyer, Michael Sweeney, and then to Chicago TV reporter Mike Parker until 1989, when they divorced. She married Bill Scheer in 1994, and the couple divorced several years later.
