= KATV =

Television station in Little Rock, Arkansas

- Little Rock–Pine Bluff, Arkansas; United States
- City: Little Rock, Arkansas
- Channels: Digital: 22 (UHF); Virtual: 7
- Branding: ABC 7; Channel 7

Programming
- Affiliations: 7.1: ABC; for others, see § Subchannels

Ownership
- Owner: Sinclair Broadcast Group; (KATV Licensee, LLC)

History
- First air date: December 19, 1953
- Former channel number: Analog: 7 (VHF, 1953–2009)
- Former affiliations: CBS (1953–1956); ABC (secondary, 1953–1956); NTA (secondary, 1956–1961)
- Call sign meaning: "Arkansas Television"

Technical information
- Licensing authority: FCC
- Facility ID: 33543
- ERP: 1,000 kW
- HAAT: 515 m (1,690 ft)
- Transmitter coordinates: 34°47′49.3″N 92°29′20.1″W

Links
- Public license information: Public file; LMS
- Website: katv.com

KATV (channel 7) is a television station in Little Rock, Arkansas, United States, affiliated with ABC and owned by Sinclair Broadcast Group. The station's studios are located on Riverfront Drive in the Riverdale section northwest of downtown Little Rock, and its transmitter is located at the Shinall Mountain antenna farm in the Chenal Valley area (itself a developer-created corruption of "Shinall").

== History ==
=== Griffin-Leake ownership ===
On December 9, 1952, the Central South Sales Co. (owned by John T. Griffin and James C. Leake) applied for a construction permit to build a new channel 7 TV station in Pine Bluff; it was later joined by competing applications from the Pine Bluff Television Co. (owned by Dallas construction executive Burnett Estes) on December 27, 1952, and the Arkansas Television Company (owned by construction and real estate executive Gaylord Shaw, and unrelated to the company of the same name that founded KTHV [channel 11]) on January 28, 1953. Shaw's application—filed as business colleague Estes withdrew his, with duplicate engineering data included in both applications—was accused of being a "strike" bid, purposely intended to delay the grant of the channel 7 permit. On June 18, 1953, the FCC granted the construction permit to Central South and dismissed Shaw's application on the "strike" grounds.

KATV's original logo from 1953

The station first signed on the air on December 19, 1953. It was the second station in central Arkansas behind KRTV, channel 17 in Little Rock, which had gone on the air on April 4. Originally licensed to Pine Bluff, the station was a CBS affiliate with a secondary ABC affiliation. It became a full ABC affiliate in 1956 at the expiration of its contract with CBS; between November 27, 1955, and March 31, 1956, CBS and ABC were shared by KATV and the new KTHV (channel 11). During the late 1950s, the station was also briefly affiliated with the NTA Film Network. KATV was founded by John Toole "J.T." Griffin and James C. "Jimmy" Leake (who also founded sister station KTUL in Tulsa and original sister station KWTV in Oklahoma City, the company founded by the former of the two founders would later become the present-day Griffin Communications).

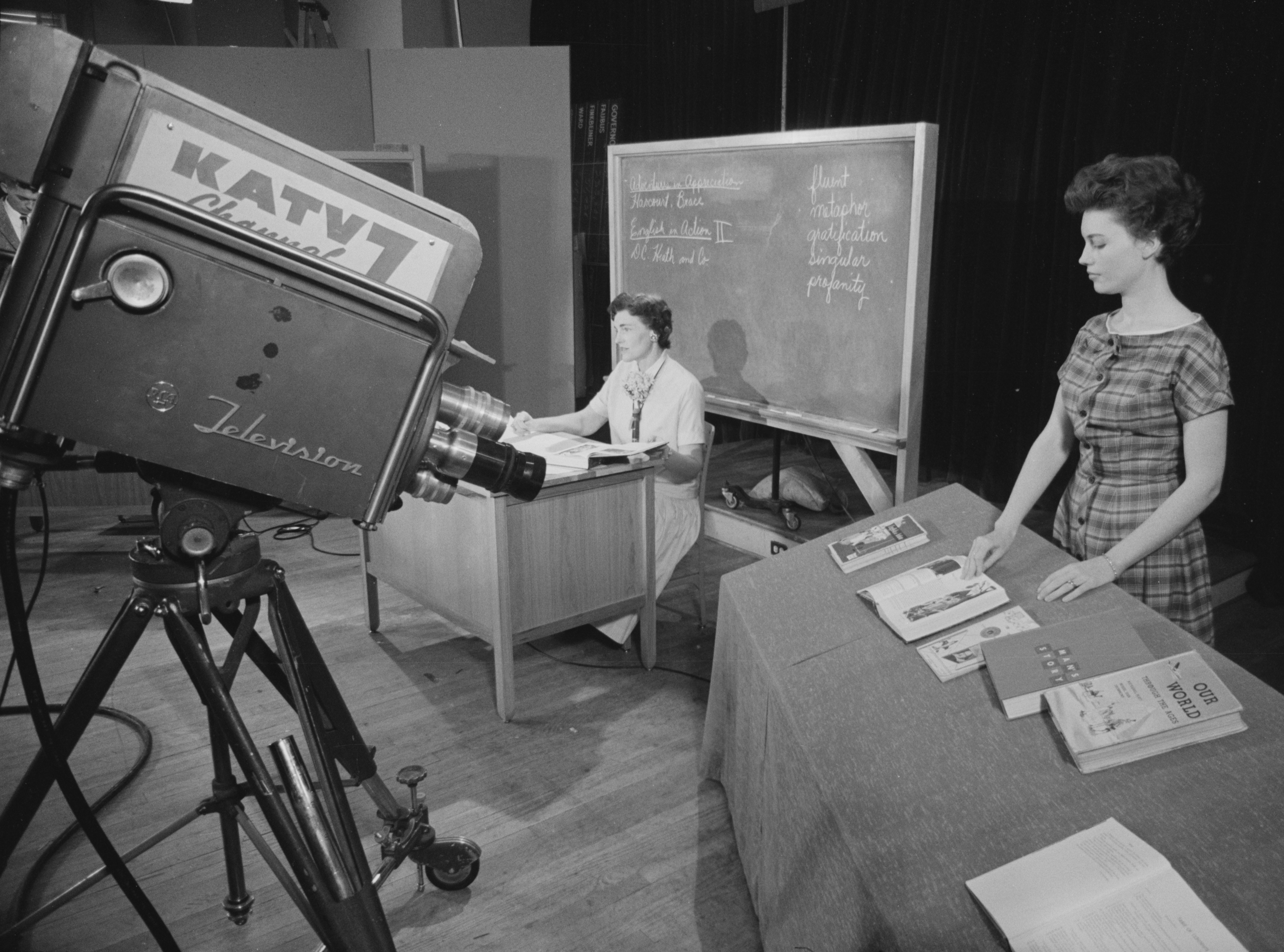
KATV broadcasting a lesson after the closure of Little Rock's high schools in 1958

KATV is Little Rock's oldest continually operating television station, beating NBC affiliate KARK-TV (channel 4) by almost five months. On-air personalities at KATV during its early years of operation included the station's first announcer, Don Curran; the first news director, Bill Hadley; and news announcer, Oscar Alagood. News cameramen included Bob Donaldson and Lou Oberste. Donaldson would later lead the film department at the University of Arkansas Medical School for many years, and Oberste would work at the Arkansas Department of Tourism. Less than a year after its debut, KATV purchased the Little Rock studios of KRTV when that station closed down. The studios were damaged in a fire that occurred on the morning of November 1, 1957.

KATV subsequently moved to a two-story building at 310 West 3rd Street; the first floor had been occupied by a furniture store, while the second floor served as studio facilities for a local radio station and also housed the offices of an insurance agency. During this time, in July 1958, KATV successfully filed to change its city of license from Pine Bluff to Little Rock, completing the move that October. In 1959, Robert Doubleday became one of the youngest television station managers in the country at the age of 26. Under Doubleday, KATV became a major competitor in the Little Rock market. (Doubleday remained as KATV's manager until 1968, when he was promoted to president of KATV and KTUL. Doubleday was replaced in his former position by general sales manager Thomas Goodgame, who would later move to Tulsa as general manager and would eventually become president of Westinghouse Broadcasting.)

KATV originally transmitted its signal from a tower near Jefferson, until a taller tower was built farther north in Redfield in 1965.

=== Sole ownership by Leake ===
In November 1963, the Griffin-Leake interests reached an agreement to buy out the respective 25% interests in KWTV held by former Oklahoma Governor Roy J. Turner and Luther Dulaney—which had expanded their interest in the Oklahoma City station in August 1962, after RKO General sold its stake in KWTV to address ownership issues related to RKO's multi-layered purchase-swap transaction involving WRC-TV and WRC-AM-FM (now WTEM and WKYS) in Washington, D.C., WNAC-TV (now defunct; former channel allocation now occupied by WHDH), WNAC-AM (now WRKO) and WRKO-FM (now WBZ-FM) in Boston, the WRCV television and radio stations (now KYW-TV and KYW [AM]) in Philadelphia, and the Washington-based WGMS radio stations (now WWRC and WTOP-FM)—for an initial payment of $200,000 and title rights to the equipment used by KWTV, KTUL and KATV. Turner and Dulaney would then sell the equipment, valued at $2.3 million, to First National Bank of Oklahoma City executives C. A. Voss and James Kite for $3 million. In turn, the three Griffin-Leake stations would be folded into a single corporate umbrella under KATV parent licensee KATV Inc. (subsequently rechristened as Griffin-Leake TV), which would enter into a ten-year equipment leasing agreement with Voss and Kite for a total of $4.5 million (or $37,500 per month). Griffin and the Leakes would own approximately all of the common voting stock and collectively own 84% of nonvoting common shares in KATV Inc. post-merger, with 10% of the remaining nonvoting interest held by Edgar Bell (who would remain executive vice president and general manager at KWTV).

KATV logo, used from 1990 to 1992.

KATV has used the Circle 7 logo since 1965, a logo that had traditionally been associated at the time with ABC owned-and-operated stations, and was one of the network's first affiliates to have used the logo (as designed by G. Dean Smith in 1962). KATV's use of the Circle 7 logo predates even the variant Circle 7 used by Allbritton flagship station WJLA-TV in Washington, D.C. from 1977 until it switched to the standard version in 2001. However, unlike WJLA and most of the O&Os, prior to the Sinclair purchase KATV paired the ABC logo with the Circle 7 sparingly, usually in on-screen logo bugs in which the Circle 7 covers the standard ABC bug. KATV also first placed the Circle 7 inside a square in the 1990s; WJLA now uses this version as well, though neither station uses it consistently (KATV stopped placing the Circle 7 logo inside the square in September 2008). The station moved its operations to the Worthen Bank Building in downtown Little Rock in October 1970, after Worthen vacated it and moved into a new downtown skyscraper. The station gained some national attention in 1969 when they had to air Turn-On, which among viewers, "jam[med] the station's switchboard" with complaints.

In April 1969, Griffin-Leake TV announced that it would break up its holdings into two separate companies. Leake—who had moved from being a 3.5% minority partner in KATV to half-owner as a result of the earlier investor divestitures—retained ownership of KATV, KTUL, Ponca City, Oklahoma–based cable television operator Cable TV Co. and a controlling 80% interest in the construction permit for WSTE (now WORO-DT) in Fajardo, Puerto Rico, while Griffin retained ownership of KWTV under the licensee Century Communications Co. (Griffin's company would eventually return to Arkansas in September 1985, when it purchased NBC affiliate KPOM-TV [now Fox affiliate KFTA-TV] in Fort Smith from the Ozark Broadcasting Company; Griffin would sell KPOM and the Rogers-based satellite station it signed on in October 1989, KFAA-TV [now KNWA-TV], to the Nexstar Broadcasting Group—owner of KATV rival KARK-TV—in September 2003.)

=== Allbritton ownership ===
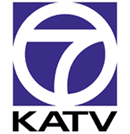
KATV logo, used from 1999 to 2005.

On November 3, 1982, Leake Industries sold KATV and KTUL to Washington, D.C.–based Allbritton Communications in an all-cash transaction for $80 million; the sale received FCC approval on February 14, 1983.

In February 1999, KATV aired commercials for the Walt Disney Pictures animated film Doug's 1st Movie during an ABC network broadcast of Disney's Doug. Nearly eight years later, in 2007, the FCC levied a $8,000 fine against KATV for violating the "host-selling" provision in the Children's Television Act that classifies the broadcast of a commercial that features characters from a children's program being televised (thus classified as the 'hosts') as a program-length commercial. KATV appealed the fine, claiming the error was due to a last-minute insertion order from ABC. However, it lost the appeal in April 2010.

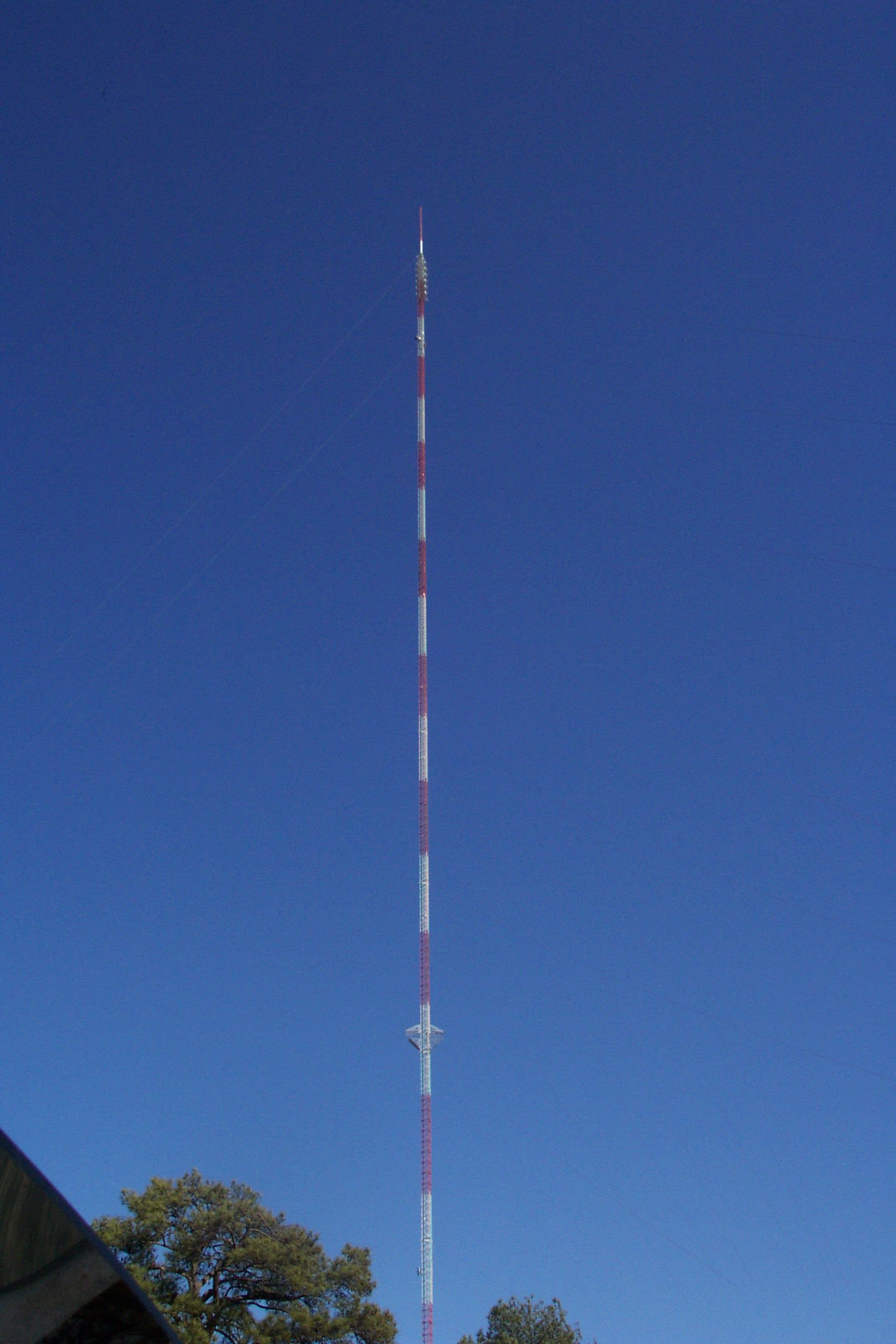
KATV's former transmitter tower in Redfield, used until its collapse on January 11, 2008.

The station's transmitter tower in Redfield collapsed on January 11, 2008, while workers were adjusting guy wires (the tower was also used by the Arkansas Educational Television Network for the analog signal of flagship station KETS (channel 2), whose analog signal remained off-air until June 13, 2008, when a temporary analog antenna was installed at the Clear Channel Broadcasting Tower Redfield, where its digital transmitter had already originated). However, KATV's analog signal remained off the air for two weeks, until it built temporary transmitter facilities from an auxiliary tower on Shinall Mountain used by CBS affiliate KTHV. Now-defunct Little Rock-based Equity Media Holdings initially helped restore KATV's signal to area cable and satellite providers by relaying its digital signal over the third digital subchannel of KWBF (channel 42, now KARZ-TV and owned by Nexstar Media Group)—originally as digital channel 42.3 in standard definition, later remapped as digital channel 7.1 and upgraded to high definition.

KATV's analog signal remained on Comcast in the Little Rock area after the collapse as it received the station through a direct feed from KATV's Main Street studios, although the HD feed was initially interrupted; Comcast also delivered KATV's signal to other cable and satellite providers. KATV eventually received FCC approval to build a new tower on Shinall Mountain, where Little Rock's other major network affiliates (and both of KATV's present backup signals) are located. The license for the station's analog signal continued to reference the Redfield tower as its transmitter site while the station was broadcasting in analog from the temporary site on Shinall Mountain, as well as in digital over a subchannel of KWBF. KATV began transmitting its digital signal from the new facility located on Shinall Mountain on February 1, 2009.

==== Donation to Pryor Center ====
In 2009, KATV donated approximately 300 hours of film and 26,000 hours of video tape to the University of Arkansas David and Barbara Pryor Center for Arkansas Oral and Visual History. For nearly eight years, the donated footage remained untouched until the Tyson family donated $1.5 million to the Pryor Center to digitize the footage. As of August 2019, the first digitized images are available on the Pryor Center's website.

=== Acquisition by Sinclair Broadcast Group ===
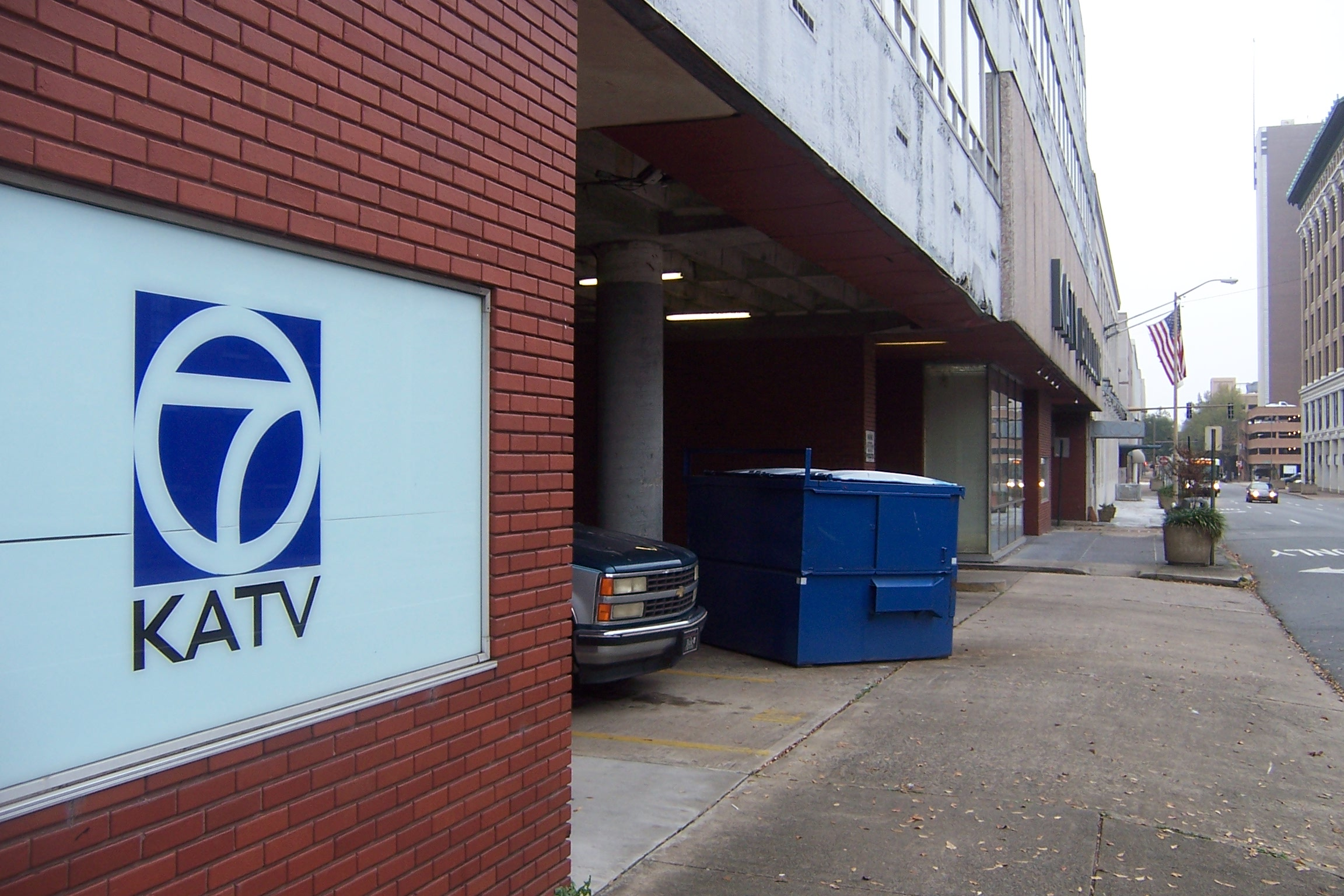
KATV's former studio on Fourth Street in Little Rock.

On July 29, 2013, Allbritton announced that it would sell its seven television stations, including KATV, to the Hunt Valley, Maryland–based Sinclair Broadcast Group for $985 million, to concentrate the company's operations exclusively around its political news website, Politico. However, the sale's regulatory process was held up for nearly a year, as Sinclair attempted to address ownership issues involving stations it already operated in three markets (WTTO/WDBB and WABM in Birmingham, Alabama, WMMP in Charleston, South Carolina, and WHP-TV and WLYH-TV in Harrisburg, Pennsylvania) and Albritton-owned stations that placed Sinclair in conflict with FCC regulations on local station ownership (WBMA/WCFT/WJSU, WCIV and WHTM, respectively), specifically with regard to LMAs that were grandfathered following a 1999 ruling by the Commission that such agreements made after November 5, 1996, covering the programming of more than 15% of a station's broadcast day would count toward the ownership limits for the brokering station's parent licensee. (A sale of any of the affected Allbritton properties to a separate buyer was not an option for Sinclair, as Allbritton wanted its stations to be sold together to limit the tax rate that the company would have had to pay from the accrued proceeds, which it estimated would have been substantially higher if the group was sold piecemeal; Sinclair sold most of the conflict outlets to Howard Stirk Holdings on the pretense that it would forego entering into operational agreements with Sinclair.) After nearly a year of delays, Sinclair's deal to acquire Allbritton was approved by the FCC on July 24, 2014, and was completed on August 1.

On February 20, 2019, KATV announced that it would relocate to a renovated facility in the city's Riverdale district in a building Sinclair purchased for $4.36 million. A city zoning variance request to build a 100-foot (30 m) studio-to-transmitter link tower next to the building had initially been withdrawn, amid opposition from residents of a nearby condominium complex on visual and property value concerns, but was granted by the Little Rock Board of Adjustment to the building's former owners in December 2019. However, KATV originally planned to move to the Riverdale facility in early 2020, the relocation was delayed due to the COVID-19 pandemic. Upon its move to the Riverdale building, the Main Street facility is to be redeveloped as part of the planned Little Rock Technology Park complex. The move was completed in mid-January 2023, with the first newscast originating from Riverdale on January 13.

== News operation ==
KATV presently broadcasts 31 1/2 hours of locally produced newscasts each week (with 5 1/2 hours each weekday, three hours on Saturdays and one hour on Sundays); in addition, the station produces the Sunday morning business and political discussion program Talk Business and Politics, hosted by Roby Brock (the program previously aired on Fox affiliate KLRT-TV (channel 16) from its debut in 2000 until its move to KATV on March 2, 2014). KATV is currently one of only two television stations in the Little Rock market (alongside CBS affiliate KTHV, which debuted a Saturday morning newscast in April 2010) that carries a newscast on weekend mornings, the station has produced a Saturday edition of Channel 7 News Daybreak since 1992; KATV does not currently air news programming on Sunday mornings.

Arkansas political scientist and pollster Jim Ranchino, who had been appearing on the station as a commentator during elections since 1972, died of a heart attack as he was waiting to offer election commentary on KATV on November 7, 1978. Ranchino was a professor at Ouachita Baptist University and an ally of Bill Clinton, who was elected governor of Arkansas on the night that Ranchino collapsed and died in the studio.

From 2001 to June 30, 2005, KATV rebroadcast its weeknight 6 and 10 p.m. newscasts on Pax TV affiliate KYPX (channel 49, now MeTV affiliate KMYA-DT) under a news share agreement, which was discontinued as a result of a decision by Paxson Communications (now Ion Media) to terminate news share agreements with major network affiliates in the markets it had a Pax station, due to financial troubles as well as its rebranding as i: Independent Television (now Ion Television). KATV was one of a few television stations affiliated with a network other than NBC to participate in a news share agreement with a Pax TV station.

On September 20, 2010, KATV expanded its weekday morning newscast to 2 1/2 hours, moving the start time to 4:30 a.m. On September 10, 2011, KATV became the fourth (and final) television station in the Little Rock market to begin broadcasting its local newscasts in high definition (KTHV became the first station in the market to produce its newscasts in high definition in December 2010, and KARK and KLRT both began producing its newscasts in HD in April 2011, making the transition within five days of one another).

=== Notable former on-air staff ===
- Paul Eells – sports director and "Voice of the Razorbacks" (1978–2006)
- Kristin Fisher – reporter
- Missy Irvin – former news editor
- Rob Johnson
- Anne Pressly – news anchor/reporter
- Susan Roesgen – anchor/reporter (1990s–2000s, now at WGNO)
- David Shuster – reporter (1994–1996)
- Nancy Snyderman – medical reporter (1984)
- Kate Sullivan – anchor/reporter (2000–2006)

== Technical information ==
=== Subchannels ===
The station's signal is multiplexed:

Subchannels of KATV
Subchannel	Res.	Short name	Programming
7.1	720p	ABC	ABC
7.2	480i	Comet	Comet
7.3	480i	Charge!	Charge!
7.4	480i	ROAR	Roar
7.5	480i	TheNest	The Nest

=== Analog-to-digital conversion ===
KATV shut down its analog signal, over VHF channel 7, on June 12, 2009, the official date on which full-power television stations in the United States transitioned from analog to digital broadcasts under federal mandate. The station's digital signal remained on its pre-transition UHF channel 22, using virtual channel 7.

== Out-of-market carriage ==
KATV primarily serves the central portion of Arkansas. During the analog era, many sections of the state as well as western sections of Bolivar and Coahoma counties in west-central Mississippi were able to receive KATV's signal. KATV was also carried on cable systems in those areas, including Greenville, Cleveland and Clarksdale.

On July 6, 2004, a spectacular intense high MUF Sporadic-E opening allowed Mike Bugaj to receive KATV in Enfield, Connecticut, 1,176 miles (1,893 km) from Little Rock.
