= Harry Porterfield =

American news anchor (1928–2023)

Harry Porterfield (August 29, 1928 – October 23, 2023) was an American news anchor for WBBM-TV.

== Life and career ==
Porterfield was born in Saginaw, Michigan, and began his career in 1955, working as a disc jockey for WKNX. Porterfield began working at WBBM in 1964 as a news writer. Porterfield left WBBM in 1985 for WLS-TV, where he worked for 24 years, but returned to WBBM in 2009 as the 11 a.m. news anchor. In December 2015, Porterfield announced his retirement.

While working for both WBBM and WLS, Porterfield was known for his "Someone You Should Know" segments.

=== CBS Boycott ===
In 1985, Porterfield was demoted from his job as anchorman at CBS affiliate WBBM to reporter when former anchorman Bill Kurtis returned to the station and was given his old time slot and position back. As a result, Porterfield resigned from WBBM and moved to the ABC affiliate WLS. This resulted in a 10-month boycott of CBS led by Jesse Jackson and Operation PUSH.

=== Death ===
Harry Porterfield died on October 23, 2023, at the age of 95.

== Awards ==
Porterfield won eleven Emmy Awards, a Studs Terkel Award, and the Alfred I. duPont–Columbia University Award. Porterfield also received the Legacy of Leadership Award at the Indiana University Neal-Marshall Eleventh Annual Alumni Graduation Reception.
