= WBBM-TV =

Television station in Chicago

ATSC 3.0 station

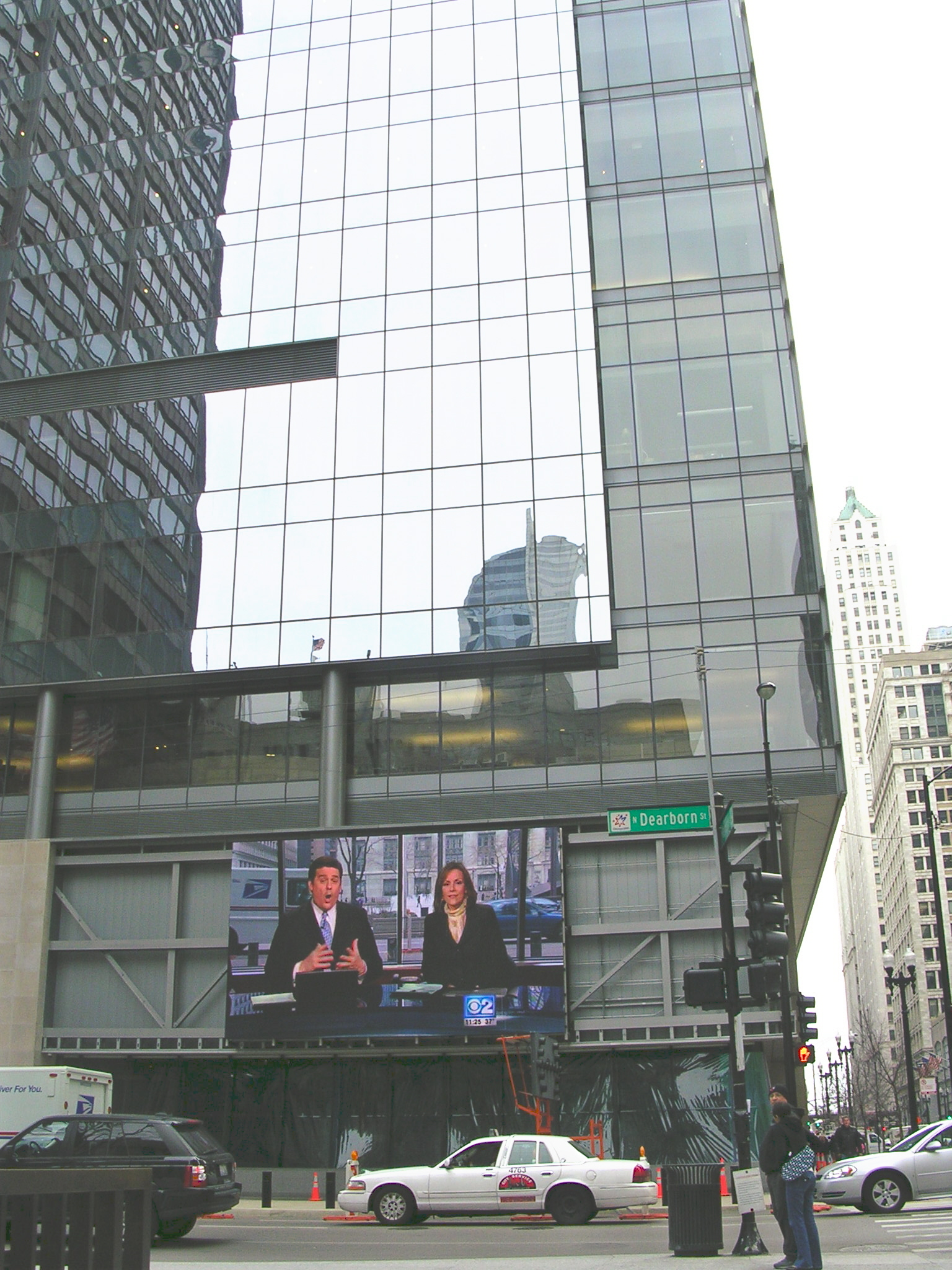
- WBBM-TV's studios at Washington Boulevard and Dearborn Street, across from Daley Plaza.
- Chicago, Illinois; United States
- Channels: Digital: 12 (VHF); Virtual: 2
- Branding: CBS Chicago; CBS News Chicago

Programming
- Affiliations: 2.1: CBS; for others, see § Subchannels

Ownership
- Owner: CBS Television Stations; (CBS Broadcasting Inc.)

History
- Founded: August 5, 1940
- First air date: September 6, 1946
- Former call signs: W9XBK (1940–1946); WBKB (1946–1953)
- Former channel numbers: Analog: 4 (VHF, 1940–1953), 2 (VHF, 1953–2009); Digital: 3 (VHF, 2003–2009)
- Former affiliations: Independent (1946–1949); Paramount (1949–1953)
- Call sign meaning: Taken from WBBM radio

Technical information
- Licensing authority: FCC
- Facility ID: 9617
- ERP: 29.5 kW
- HAAT: 500.4 m (1,642 ft)
- Transmitter coordinates: 41°52′44″N 87°38′8″W

Links
- Public license information: Public file; LMS
- Website: www.cbsnews.com/chicago/

WBBM-TV (channel 2) is a television station in Chicago, Illinois, United States. Owned and operated by the CBS television network through its CBS Television Stations division, the station maintains studios on West Washington Street in the Loop, and it transmits from atop the Willis Tower.

== History ==
=== Early history (1940–1953) ===
WBBM-TV traces its history to 1940 when Balaban and Katz, a subsidiary of Paramount Pictures, signed on experimental station W9XBK, the first all-electronic television facility in Chicago. Balaban and Katz was already well known for owning several movie theaters in the Chicago area. To establish the station, the company hired television pioneer William C. "Bill" Eddy away from RCA's experimental station W2XBS in New York City. When World War II began, Eddy used the W9XBK facilities as a prototype school for training Navy electronics technicians. While operating the Navy school, Eddy continued to lead W9XBK and wrote a book that defined commercial television for many years.

On September 6, 1946, the station received a commercial license as WBKB (for Balaban and Katz Broadcasting) on VHF channel 4, becoming the first commercial station located outside the Eastern Time Zone; it was also the sixth commercial TV station in the United States behind WNBT (now WNBC), WCBW (now WCBS-TV), WABD (now WNYW) all in New York City; WRGB in Schenectady, New York; and WPTZ (now KYW-TV) in Philadelphia. WBKB aired some of the earliest CBS programs, including the 1947 debut of Junior Jamboree (later renamed Kukla, Fran and Ollie after it moved to NBC in 1948). Channel 4 originally operated as an independent station, since at the time it was not clear that it would be an affiliate of either CBS or the DuMont Television Network; eventually, KSD-TV (now KSDK) in St. Louis became the first television station west of the Eastern Time Zone to affiliate with a major network. One of the station's early highlights was its telecast of the National Football League's championship game between the Chicago Cardinals and the Philadelphia Eagles on December 28, 1947.

In December 1948, WBKB began sharing the market's CBS affiliation with WGN-TV (channel 9), after that station affiliated with the network. In 1949, Balaban and Katz became part of United Paramount Theatres, after Paramount Pictures was forced to divest its chain of movie theaters by order of the United States Supreme Court.

WBKB played an indirect role in DuMont's demise. At the time, Paramount Pictures owned a stake in DuMont. The Federal Communications Commission (FCC) ruled that Paramount's holdings were large enough that the studio effectively controlled DuMont. Paramount also owned KTLA in Los Angeles; since DuMont already owned WABD (now WNYW) in New York City, WTTG in Washington, D.C., and WDTV (now sister station KDKA-TV) in Pittsburgh, the FCC's decision meant neither Paramount nor DuMont could acquire any more television stations. Paramount even launched a short-lived programming service, the Paramount Television Network (no relation to today's cable-only Paramount Network), in 1949, with KTLA and WBKB as its flagship stations; however, the service never gelled into a true television network.

=== As a CBS owned-and-operated station (since 1953) ===
In February 1953, United Paramount Theaters merged with the American Broadcasting Company (ABC), which already owned WENR-TV (channel 7). As the newly merged entity could not keep both stations since FCC regulations enforced during that time forbade the common ownership of two television stations licensed to the same market, WBKB was sold to CBS for $6.75 million. On February 12, one day after the merger was finalized, the station changed its call letters to WBBM-TV, after WBBM radio (780 AM and 96.3 FM), which CBS had owned since 1929. The WBKB call letters were subsequently assumed by channel 7 (that station would eventually change its callsign to WLS-TV in 1968, and the callsign now resides at a CBS-affiliated station in Alpena, Michigan). While the old WBKB's talent remained with the new WBBM-TV under the radio station's longtime general manager, H. Leslie Atlass, the UPT-era management of the old WBKB moved to channel 7.

As a result of WBBM-TV's purchase by CBS, it picked up all CBS programming previously carried by WGN-TV, after a two-month cancellation clause in channel 9's affiliation contract with CBS; this left channel 9 with the quickly crumbling DuMont as its sole network affiliation.

In accordance with the VHF channel allocation realignments imposed by the FCC in its issuance of the Sixth Report and Order, WBBM-TV relocated to channel 2 on July 5, 1953, to eliminate interference with WTMJ-TV in Milwaukee and WHBF-TV in the Quad Cities. WTMJ-TV concurrently moved to VHF channel 4—from channel 3—to avoid interference with fellow CBS affiliate WKZO-TV (now WWMT) in Kalamazoo, Michigan (on the other side of Lake Michigan), which itself broadcast on channel 3. The channel 2 allocation was coincidentally freed up at the same time as the state capital of Springfield was forced to let the allocation relocate to St. Louis, where the allocation was assigned to KTVI. The reshuffling also forced Zenith to shut down KS2XBS, an experimental station on channel 2 in Chicago that the company maintained for its pioneering pay-per-view service Phonevision.

In 1956, CBS consolidated its Chicago operations into the former Chicago Arena, a renovated 62,000-square-foot (5,800 m^{2}), three-story building at 633 North McClurg Court in the Streeterville neighborhood; the property was built in 1924 as a horse stable, and had operated as an ice rink and bowling alley prior to CBS' approximately $1.3 million purchase of the building.

That year, an episode of What's My Line? originated from the WBBM studios, airing one day prior to the start of the 1956 Democratic National Convention. Between the late 1940s and early 1970s, Columbia Records housed an office and recording studio in the building. On September 26, 1960, WBBM's McClurg Court studios served as the site of the first televised presidential debate between John F. Kennedy and Richard Nixon. WBBM-TV also served as production home to the syndicated programs Donahue (from 1982 to 1985) and Siskel & Ebert (from 1986 to the late 1990s, when production migrated to the studios of WLS-TV on State Street).

In October 1987, Center City Communications—a locally based investor group led by attorney Brenda Minor—filed a challenge to the FCC's renewal of WBBM-TV's station license. However, in asking the agency not to renew the station's license through 1992, Center City never detailed any specific objections to the station's license renewal, although it had been speculated that the challenge may have been related to the then-recent boycott by Operation PUSH surrounding the lack of diversity with the station's staff and allegations that WBBM's hiring practices were not fair towards Blacks; Minor (who is African American) later cited that the station did not fulfill obligations to public affairs programming. Center City dropped its challenge three months later in July, after reaching a settlement agreement with CBS in which Center City agreed not to challenge the license renewal of any CBS station for a five-year period, in return for a $187,500 payment by CBS. The challenge sparked calls for the FCC to reform its comparative renewal process, which certain broadcasters claim was used solely for the purpose of "extort[ing]" large cash settlements from stations.

The station was brought back under common ownership with Paramount Pictures when Viacom—which acquired the studio from Gulf and Western in 1994—merged with (the original) CBS Corporation in a $36 billion deal in February 2000. This union was broken up again in December 2005 when Viacom became CBS Corporation and spun off Paramount Pictures and Viacom's cable networks into a separate company that assumed the Viacom name.

In 2003, WBBM signed a lease agreement with Arlington, Virginia–based developer The Mills Corporation to build a "media center" for the station in the "Block 37" developments in the Loop business district, with plans to include a street-level studio that would overlook Daley Plaza. WBBM had earlier considered selling the McClurg Court facility with the intent to relocate into a new studio complex in 1998 (with areas on North Fairbanks Court, North Michigan Avenue and West Jackson Street as potential sites for the planned facility); however, the plans were postponed due to transition to high-definition broadcasting.

On September 21, 2008, WBBM-TV moved to new facilities in the "Block 37" studio at the corner of Dearborn and Washington streets, with a 30-by-19-foot (9.1 m × 5.8 m) LED screen that adorns the lower facade of the 17-story building (which some residents complained is "tacky and visually hyperactive"). This move coincided with the upgrade of channel 2's newscasts to high definition, making WBBM the fourth television station in the Chicago market to begin broadcasting their newscasts in the format (field footage converted to the format over a period of years); in early 2006, the WBBM radio stations moved into new studio facilities within Two Prudential Plaza on North Stetson Avenue. The former McClurg Court facility building was demolished over a two-month period from February to April 2009. WBBM-TV moved its news set upstairs to a more traditional studio in September 2017 after an obligation to maintain its main studio in the streetside space for ten years was fulfilled, with CBS eventually removing the LED screen and putting the space up for retail lease in 2019, though with no interest coming in during the COVID-19 pandemic, WBBM-TV returned to using it late in 2020 to allow for wider social distancing of station workspaces.

WBBM-TV shut down its analog signal, over VHF channel 2, on June 12, 2009, the official date on which full-power television stations in the United States transitioned from analog to digital broadcasts under federal mandate. The station's digital signal moved from pre-transition VHF channel 3 to the current, post-transition VHF channel 12, using virtual channel 2.

On October 21, 2014, CBS and locally based Weigel Broadcasting announced that they would partner to launch Decades, a digital multicast network. The network soft launched in the Chicago market on WBBM digital channel 2.2, when that subchannel launched on February 1, 2015, with the network making its formal national debut four months later on May 25. Decades moved to WCIU-DT4 on September 3, 2018, with WBBM-DT2 becoming the home of a second Weigel/CBS concept network known as Start TV, which specializes in airing procedural dramas with women in the lead roles.

On February 2, 2017, CBS agreed to sell CBS Radio to Entercom (now Audacy), currently the fourth-largest radio broadcasting company in the United States. The sale was completed on November 17, 2017, and was conducted using a Reverse Morris Trust so that it was tax-free. While CBS shareholders retained a 72% ownership stake in the combined company, Entercom was the surviving entity, with WBBM radio and its sister stations now separated from WBBM-TV (though WBBM Newsradio maintains a continuing and strong overall partnership with WBBM-TV).

In August 2018, Jeff Harris took up the helm as news director of WBBM-TV. Long-time evening anchor Rob Johnson was let go in March 2019, replaced by Brad Edwards. Edwards joined Irika Sargent in the 5, 6, and 10 pm newscasts. Edwards shifted to the morning newscast in May 2022 as part of a talent adjustment when former WGN-TV and inaugural NewsNation anchor Joe Donlon took over his former position, months after inaugural NewsNation news director Jennifer Lyons became WBBM's president and general manager after a shift in that network's news philosophy the two disagreed on carrying forward for Nexstar.

== Programming ==
=== Sports programming ===
From 1946 to 1951, WBKB telecast Chicago Cubs home games. Cubs owner Philip K. Wrigley believed baseball could benefit from television if a system could be developed that would appeal to housewives as well as their husbands. Wrigley gave the rights to WBKB to air the Cubs for the first two years for free. The first attempt to telecast a Cubs' game, on April 21, 1946, was unsuccessful, due to electrical interference in the State-Lake building where the station's transmitter was located. The July 13, 1946, contest between the Cubs and Brooklyn Dodgers marked Chicago's first successful telecast of a Major League game.

In 1956, when CBS began televising National Football League (NFL) games, WBBM became the primary station for the Chicago Bears, carrying most of the team's regular-season games (as well as preseason games off and on through the years), and until they moved to St. Louis in 1960, they were also the primary station for Chicago Cardinals regular-season games as well; the WBBM-Bears partnership continued until the end of the 1993 season, when the network lost the rights to the National Football Conference (NFC) to Fox with the majority of games being carried since then by that network's Chicago O&O WFLD. Presently, WBBM-TV carries Bears regular season games only during weeks in which the team is scheduled to host an American Football Conference (AFC) opponent at Soldier Field in a Sunday afternoon timeslot. However, beginning in 2014 with the introduction of "cross-flex" scheduling (and with it the end of determining broadcast rights by conference), exceptions exist for certain game telecasts that CBS originally held rights to which are shifted to Fox (such as the 2014 home game against the Buffalo Bills), and NFC vs. NFC games that are conversely shifted from Fox to CBS (such as a 2019 home game against the Minnesota Vikings). Additionally, Super Bowl XLI, where the Bears played against the Indianapolis Colts, was televised on CBS and WBBM.

From 1973 to 1990, WBBM-TV aired select Chicago Bulls games via the NBA on CBS.

From 2003 to 2007, WBBM-TV served as the host broadcaster of the Chicago Marathon, which is held annually in October, taking over from NBC owned-and-operated station WMAQ-TV; to accommodate the telecast, some CBS News programs were preempted or delayed. Marathon coverage returned to WMAQ-TV in 2008.

=== News operation ===
Logo for CBS News Chicago; this version was used in conjunction with the CBS 2 News brand until July 8, 2024.

WBBM-TV broadcasts 37 hours, 25 minutes of locally produced newscasts each week (with 6 hours, 5 minutes each weekday; 4 1/2 hours on Saturdays; and 2 1/2 hours on Sundays).

==== News department history ====
1977 newspaper ad for WBBM-TV's newscasts, which had become so popular in Chicago by that time that they were named THE Ten O'Clock News.

In the late 1970s, WBBM-TV's newscasts surged past WMAQ-TV for first place; its news department during that time had become one of the most respected local news operations in the country, and was considered a bastion of serious journalism. Led by anchors Bill Kurtis and Walter Jacobson, weatherman John Coughlin and sports director Johnny Morris, WBBM dominated the news ratings during the late 1970s and early 1980s. At one point, its dominance was so absolute that the station titled its 10 pm newscast, THE Ten O'Clock News.

Kurtis and Jacobson were first teamed together in 1973 by general manager Robert Wussler and news director Van Gordon Sauter, who introduced a hard news format and began using the newsroom as the set for all of channel 2's newscasts. Kurtis became known for his "Focus Unit" in-depth reports, and Jacobson for his "Perspective" commentaries. Among the other news staffers employed with WBBM-TV during this period were film critic Gene Siskel; police and crime reporter John "Bulldog" Drummond; women and consumer issues reporter Susan Anderson; feature reporter Bob Wallace; investigative reporter Pam Zekman; medical reporter Roger Field; political reporter Mike Flannery; and reporter/weekend news anchor Mike Parker. Bob Sirott and Phil Ponce—who would both later host the newsmagazine program Chicago Tonight on PBS member station WTTW (channel 11)—were also employed as reporters for WBBM-TV during this period. Parker and Zekman both remained with the station until their respective departures in 2016 and 2020; Drummond also still contributes occasional reports.

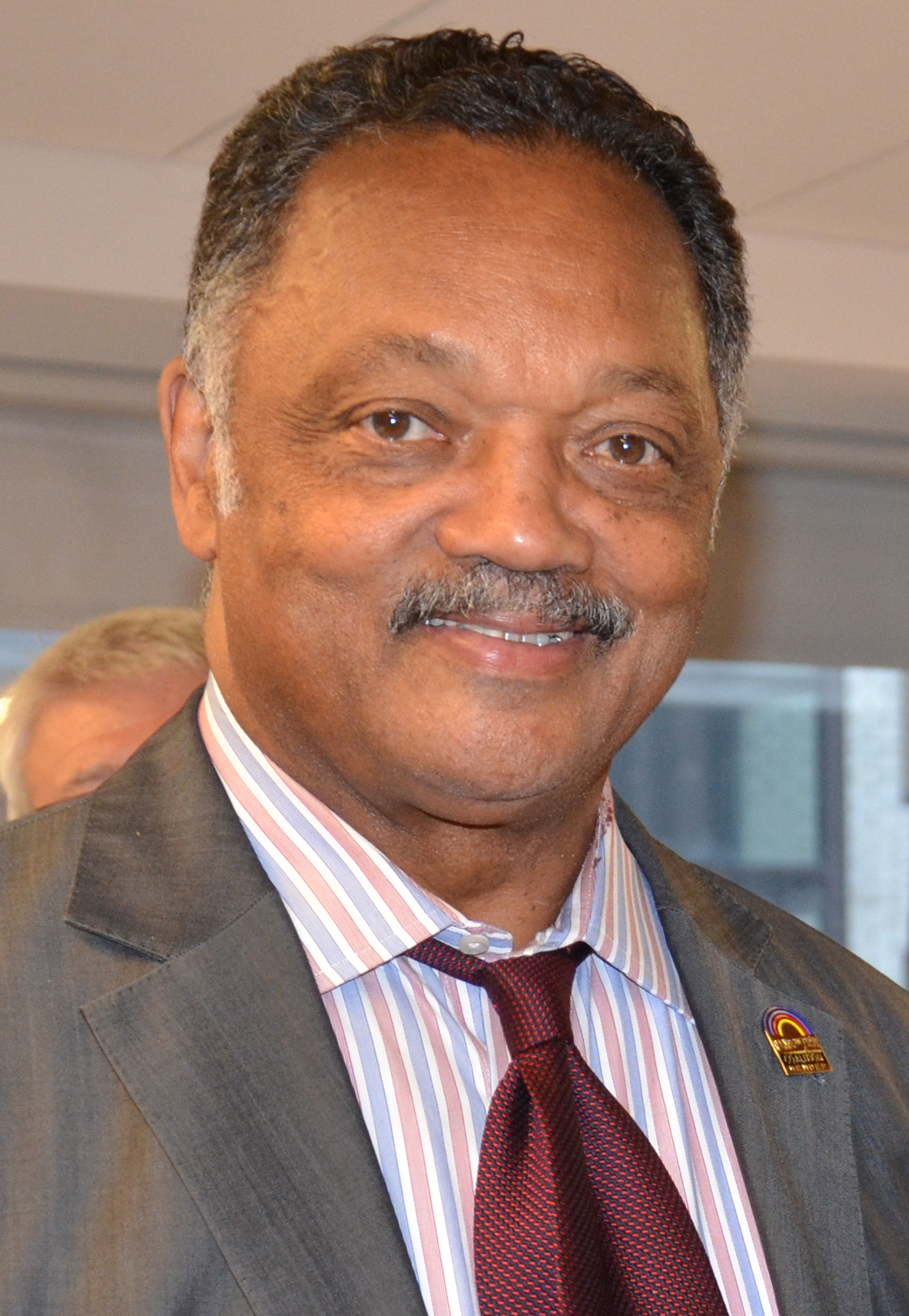
Harry Porterfield's demotion to weekend anchorman in 1985 prompted Rev. Jesse Jackson (pictured in 2013) to lead a boycott of WBBM-TV, which led to significant changes in the station's racial hiring quota.

In 1982, Kurtis left WBBM-TV to join CBS News as anchor of the CBS Morning News; he was replaced as anchor of WBBM's weeknight newscasts by former WMAQ-TV anchor Don Craig. When Kurtis returned to channel 2 three years later in October 1985, he was teamed with Craig on the hour-long 6 pm newscast; Harry Porterfield, who had co-anchored that newscast for several years, was concurrently demoted to weekend evenings. Porterfield—who is African American—later left to become a reporter and part-time anchor at WLS, but his earlier demotion led Jesse Jackson and his locally based civil rights organization Operation PUSH to begin a boycott of WBBM-TV (at one point, drafting a proposal to CBS and WBBM-TV station management that called for the station to implement a 40% minority hiring quota, hire two black male anchors to its news staff and have CBS grant a financial commitment of $11 million to minority interests) that lasted until August 1986; in the midst of the boycott, Gary Cummings resigned as WBBM vice president and general manager in March 1986, and was replaced two weeks later by one-time assistant news director Johnathan Rodgers, who became the first African American GM at the station. WBBM-TV later hired African-American journalist Lester Holt (later of NBC News) to replace Porterfield as evening anchor. Kurtis left WBBM for the second time in 1996.

In March 1986, WLS-TV, which had been third for many years, overtook WBBM at number 1. In 1990, WBBM hired Bill Applegate, who had taken WLS to first place as its news director, as general manager. Applegate took Jacobson off the anchor desk (Jacobson eventually left for WFLD in April 1993) and controversially made the newscasts much flashier than they had previously been; the reporting staff during this period notably included Elizabeth Vargas (formerly with ABC News), Rob Stafford (now at WMAQ-TV), Jim Avila (now at ABC), Larry Mendte (now a commentator at WPIX in New York City) and Dawn Stensland (a former 10 pm anchor at Fox-owned WTXF-TV in Philadelphia). It was enough for a rebound the station to a first-place tie with WLS-TV by 1993. The momentum did not last as Vargas, Avila, Mendte, Stafford and Stensland all left the station within a short time; by the mid-1990s, however, WBBM-TV had fallen to last place. For most of the next decade, WLS and WMAQ fought for first place, while WBBM-TV's news division languished, with its newscasts often trailing syndicated reruns on WFLD. The station has undergone several different on-air branding schemes over the years—from its longtime brand of Channel 2 News to News 2 Chicago in 1997 and later to the present CBS 2 News.

The most notable of many changes WBBM-TV has made to its news operation occurred in 2000, when it revamped its 10 pm newscast by ditching the traditional news format in favor of a focus on in-depth "hard news" features, a staple of the station's glory days. Anchored by former longtime WMAQ anchor Carol Marin, the newscast was hailed as a return to quality in-depth journalism in the best CBS tradition at a time when tabloid journalism and "soft news" were becoming the norm in broadcast news. However, plummeting ratings led to the newscast's format being dropped in October after only nine months, with the program reverting to a more traditional late news format.

In April 2002, the station eliminated its year-old computer-intensive graphics and "newsplex" studio in favor of a simpler studio and corresponding graphics set. That March, former Good Morning America newsreader Antonio Mora were appointed as WBBM's main anchor; former WLS-TV anchor Diann Burns joined Mora at the anchor desk in October 2003. In January 2006, WBBM-TV earned its best finish at 5 pm in 13 years, when it surpassed WMAQ for second place in the timeslot, although it was still far behind WLS. Channel 2's 10 pm news remained in last place, however it was the only late newscast to increase its audience share during the first month of 2006. WBBM-TV also finished second from sign-on to sign-off (from 6 am to 2 am), leapfrogging from fourth for its best monthly performance in 23 years. In August 2006, WBBM-TV added Rob Johnson (who had previously served as weekend anchor at WLS-TV beginning in 1998) to co-anchor the 5 pm newscast alongside Burns, while Mora and Burns continued to co-anchor at 6 and 10 pm. In May 2007, WBBM-TV slipped to fourth from sign-on to sign-off behind WLS-TV, CW affiliate WGN-TV and NBC station WMAQ, and just barely ahead of Fox station WFLD.

Immediately following that, WBBM replaced Antonio Mora on the 10 pm newscast with Johnson. Mora continued to co-anchor the 6 pm newscast and hosted Eye on Chicago, before leaving WBBM-TV in January 2008 to become evening anchor at Miami sister station WFOR-TV; Johnson then added the 6 pm newscast and Eye On Chicago to his duties. On March 31, 2008, WBBM announced that Diann Burns' contract would not be renewed; she, along with medical editor Mary Ann Childers, sports director Mark Malone, and reporters Rafael Romo and Katie McCall were among the 18 staffers laid off from the station due to budget cuts enforced by CBS Television Stations. That month, WBBM hired Ryan Baker (formerly of WMAQ-TV) to serve as its sports director.

On April 30, 2009, WBBM-TV laid off an undisclosed number of additional employees; in addition, the station canceled its weekend morning newscasts and the public affairs program Eye On Chicago, while also restructuring its weeknight 6 and 10 pm newscasts to a solo anchor format with Anne State being relegated to the 5 pm newscast, while Rob Johnson continued as anchor of the later editions. With its 10 pm newscast committed to enterprise reporting, that newscast began year-to-year growth that continues to this day. Harry Porterfield returned to WBBM-TV after 24 years at WLS-TV on August 3, 2009, to anchor the 11 am news with Roseanne Tellez, and also to continued "Someone You Should Know", the series of feature reports he began at WBBM in 1977.

On November 13, 2009, as main anchor Rob Johnson was away on vacation, Bill Kurtis and Walter Jacobson returned to channel 2 to anchor the 10 pm newscast; Jacobson later remained to continue his trademark "Perspective" commentaries. During the November 2009 sweeps period, WBBM-TV's 10 pm newscast overtook WMAQ-TV for second place, behind market dominant WLS-TV, and was the only late-night newscast in Chicago to see a viewership increase over the November 2008 sweeps period.

In January 2010, ratings for the 10 pm newscast remained in second place, increasing from the previous year from a 4.3 to 6.0 rating. During the February 2010 Nielsen ratings sweeps period, the 10 pm news slipped back to third place behind WMAQ due in large part to the latter network's airing of the 2010 Winter Olympics. By May 2012, WBBM-TV's 10 pm newscast finished second behind WLS. On February 1, 2010, WBBM replaced its weekday morning newscast with Monsters and Money in the Morning, a roundtable talk show hosted by Mike North and Dan Jiggetts (former hosts at radio station WSCR (670 AM) and of Comcast SportsNet Chicago's Monsters in the Morning) that focused on sports and financial topics, along with news and weather segments. The program – which was produced independently from the news department to allow revenue from endorsements and product placement – was canceled due to low ratings after seven months later, ending on August 27; it was replaced on August 30 by a more conventional morning news program, anchored by former WCBS-TV anchor Steve Bartelstein.

In March 2010, Anne State's contract was not renewed, while longtime meteorologist and technology reporter Ed Curran was relieved of his duties (though he continued to be paid for the remaining 14 months of his contract). Longtime political editor Mike Flannery also left the station after 30 years to join rival WFLD. On September 1, 2010, Kurtis and Jacobson were paired together again as anchors of WBBM's 6 pm newscast, where they remained until February 2013, at which time Rob Johnson and former WCBS-TV morning anchor Kate Sullivan – the latter of whom joined WBBM on September 13, 2010, to co-anchor the 5 and 10 pm newscasts, where she remained until September 2015 – assumed anchor duties for the program. WBBM's evening newscasts showed significant growth afterward, often battling with WMAQ-TV for second place behind dominant WLS-TV. Weekend morning newscasts returned to WBBM on September 22, 2012; with the relaunch, Ed Curran also returned to the station as meteorologist for the new Saturday and Sunday morning newscasts. Following the station's best ratings turnout on Sunday morning since the introduction of Nielsen's Local People Meters, WBBM expanded its Sunday morning newscast to two hours – with an additional hour-long broadcast at 6 am – on September 22, 2013.

On February 17, 2018, WBBM added a 6 pm newscast on Saturdays, becoming the first and only station in the Chicago media market to have a 6 pm newscast on Saturdays; WLS-TV, WMAQ-TV, and WGN-TV are the three remaining stations in the market to carry syndicated programming and locally produced programming or specials (and occasionally, infomercials) during the 6–7 pm hour on Saturdays. It was only temporary however.

WBBM-TV launched a streaming news service, CBSN Chicago (now CBS News Chicago) on April 21, 2020, as part of a rollout of similar services (each a localized version of the national CBSN service) across the CBS-owned stations. The service was initially planned to launch by the end of March 2020, but was delayed by the impact of the COVID-19 pandemic. In June 2020, WBBM-TV was honored with a Peabody Award for the report "Unwarranted", a 2019 investigation into botched police raids in Chicago and the impact they left on families and their homes.

On December 16, 2021, WBBM-TV announced that Jim Williams and Marie Saavedra were named co-anchors of the reestablished hour-long 4 pm newscast, which premiered on January 24, 2022, along with meteorologist Mary Kay Kleist and sports anchor Marshall Harris. This newscast returned after a 16-year hiatus, following its cancellation in 2005. In February 2022, reporter Dana Kozlov replaced Williams as weekend anchor.

On September 12, 2022, WBBM-TV debuted a 9 am half-hour weekday morning newscast as a lead-in to The Drew Barrymore Show at 9:30 am. From 9 to 10 am, the newscast streams on CBS News Chicago. It is anchored by morning co-anchors Dana Kozlov and Audrina Sinclair with meteorologist Laura Bannon and traffic reports from Kris Habermehl.

==== "The Enforcer" ====
In 1975, Chicago-based jingle composer Dick Marx wrote a theme music piece for WBBM-TV's newscasts that was based on the song "Chicago" (or "This is my City, Chicago's My Town"), a folk song written by Chicago folk singer Tary Rebenar. The popular theme, known as "Channel 2 News", and several variations on it would be used by WBBM for nearly a half-century (with the periods from 1992 to 1994, 1998 to 1999, and 2009 as said exceptions). The tune has also been adopted by several other stations across the country—mostly CBS-owned-and-operated stations and affiliates—and became the de facto official newscast theme package for CBS's O&Os. From 1994 to 1997, 2000 to 2001, 2002 to 2008 and since 2010, WBBM-TV used an updated and synthesized version of the original theme specially written for the station titled "The CBS Enforcer Music Collection", composed by Frank Gari. From 2006 to 2008, WBBM-TV used an updated version of the theme, composed by Frank's son Christian Gari. Following the station's upgrade to high-definition newscasts, WBBM-TV commissioned a new theme ("Heart of the City") composed by inthegroovemusic. On June 21, 2010, with the adoption of a new standardized graphics package that was rolled out across CBS' O&Os, WBBM-TV brought back "Enforcer" with an orchestrated "New Generation" version originally commissioned by New York City sister station WCBS-TV.

In 2022, CBS News and Stations began to phase out the "Enforcer" music from its stations, replacing it with a new theme by Antfood that incorporates the network's new sound mark.

==== Ratings ====
With the station's aforementioned weaknesses in total day ratings since the mid-1990s, WBBM-TV's newscasts are among the lowest-rated out of the news departments operated by CBS' owned-and-operated stations, generally rating fourth among the market's English language stations behind WLS-TV, WMAQ-TV and (particularly with that station's expansion of news programming since 2008) WGN-TV, but still ahead of perennial last placer WFLD; this is despite the strong lead-in by CBS' prime time lineup, which nationally has placed first among the major broadcast networks for most of the time since the 2005–06 season.

In the May 2015 local Nielsen ratings, WBBM's newscasts placed fourth overall among Chicago's television stations. The 10 pm newscast saw continued decline in viewership among the market's late newscasts, scoring a 3.5 rating (down .1 from the May 2014 sweeps period) and at a distant third in the timeslot in the coveted demographic of adults ages 25–54, earning a 0.9 (with prime time newscasts factored in, WBBM-TV's 10 pm newscast placed fourth among the Chicago market's late-evening newscasts, behind WGN-TV's 9 pm newscast). The distant third-place standing for the 10 pm newscast among the market's late newscasts was also apparent in the February 2015 local ratings, with the program earning a 4.3 rating (down a share of 0.7 compared to February 2014).

==== Controversy ====
In 2011, the station drew controversy over an interview with a four-year-old child. The interview was conducted by a freelance video stringer in the aftermath of a drive-by shooting, and when the child was asked if he would stay away from guns, the child replied he will get one in the future because of his aspirations to become a police officer. The portion where the child listed his future career aspirations was not shown during newscasts, which critics say makes the child appear as if he wants to engage in criminal acts in the future.

Station management later apologized for the video, saying they have taken steps to make sure the video will not air in subsequent newscasts, and that management have followed up with employees.

==== Notable current on-air staff ====
- Suzanne Le Mignot – anchor / reporter
- Jim Williams – anchor / also field reporter

==== Notable former on-air staff ====
- Jim Acosta
- Mike Adamle
- Adele Arakawa
- Jim Avila
- Stephen Bardo
- Steve Bartelstein
- Steve Baskerville
- Jim Berry
- Diann Burns
- Cyndy Brucato
- John Callaway^{†}
- Susan Carlson
- Mary Ann Childers
- Lauren Cohn
- John Coleman^{†}
- John Coughlin^{†}
- Frank Currier
- Penny Daniels
- Paul Douglas
- John Drury^{†}
- Jon Duncanson
- Jerry Dunphy^{†}
- Giselle Fernandez
- Fahey Flynn^{†}
- Judie Garcia
- Megan Glaros
- Lauren Green
- Burleigh Hines^{†}
- Lester Holt
- Peter Hyams
- Walter Jacobson
- Bob Jamieson
- Dan Jiggetts
- Rob Johnson
- David Kerley
- Lisa Kim
- Rich King
- Irv Kupcinet^{†}
- Bill Kurtis
- Kyung Lah
- Janet Langhart
- Joan Lovett
- Linda MacLennan
- Mark Malone
- Carol Marin
- Mai Martinez
- Corey McPherrin
- Larry Mendte
- Judi Moen
- Antonio Mora
- Geoff Morrell
- Johnny Morris
- Brent Musburger
- Mary Nissenson^{†}
- Mike North
- Mike Parker ^{†}
- Phil Ponce
- Harry Porterfield ^{†}
- Dave Price
- John Quiñones
- Robin Robinson
- Randy Salerno^{†}
- Cynthia Santana
- Warner Saunders ^{†}
- Janet Shamlian
- Bob Sirott
- Gene Siskel^{†}
- Rob Stafford
- Anne State
- Kate Sullivan
- Roseanne Tellez
- Elizabeth Vargas
- Harry Volkman^{†}
- Jenniffer Weigel
- Tim Weigel^{†}
- Pam Zekman

^{^[†]} Indicates deceased

== Technical information ==
=== Subchannels ===
As of early February 2024, WBBM-TV broadcasts a multiplexed ATSC 3.0 signal. To maintain compatibility with the current majority of digital televisions, the station's channels are also broadcast in ATSC 1.0 format on the multiplexed signals of other Chicago television stations as follows:

Subchannels provided by WBBM-TV (ATSC 1.0)
Subchannel	Res.	Short name	Programming	ATSC 1.0 host
2.1	1080i	CBS2-HD	CBS	WGN-TV
2.2	480i	StartTV	Start TV	WGBO-DT
2.3	480i	DABL	Dabl	WFLD
2.4	480i	365BLK	365BLK	WMAQ-TV
2.5	480i	Comet	Comet	WGBO-DT

Subchannel broadcast with MPEG-4 video

WBBM-TV is currently the only "full-power" television station in Chicago that broadcasts its digital signal on the VHF band (as it has since its earliest days), a band that some viewers have had trouble receiving following the June 2009 transition to digital. By contrast, WLS-TV — a rival of WBBM and the only other Chicago TV station to have operated its full-power digital signal on a VHF allocation – moved its digital broadcasts to the UHF band (channel 44), to alleviate the problems associated with VHF reception. (However, WLS retained VHF channel 7 as the allotment for its digital fill-in translator when it launched on October 31, 2009.)

=== Low-power repeater ===
To accommodate viewers having trouble picking up its VHF signal after the June 2009 digital transition, WBBM's newscasts were simulcast on an analog signal over WWME-CA (UHF channel 23), a low-power station operating a nightlight transition service.

In addition, WBBM-TV applied for a construction permit to build a low-power fill-in repeater on UHF channel 26 (the former allocation of the analog signal of WCIU-TV). However, the FCC notified WBBM that the channel 26 allocation would interfere with low-power station W25DW; on April 1, 2010, WBBM was given a 30-day notice by the agency to address the issue or have the application dismissed. It applied only for a repeater on that channel and not a full-powered signal move (as WLS-TV did). The FCC granted WBBM-TV a construction permit for the channel 26 repeater on January 18, 2012. WBBM's translator on UHF channel 26 signed on the air on March 13, 2014, with its signal operating at low power to prevent signal interference with ABC affiliate WKOW in Madison, Wisconsin.

In February 2017, in a channel sharing partnership reached to address channel 2's ever-persistent reception problems in the market, Weigel and CBS Television Stations announced that WBBM-TV and its Decades subchannel would respectively be simulcast on digital subchannels 48.3 and 48.4 of Weigel-owned independent station WMEU-CD. With WBBM-TV's ATSC 1.0 signal moving to WGN-TV's spectrum, the simulcast ended in 2024.

WBBM-LD (RF 26) signed off April 19, 2017.

=== ATSC 3.0 ===
Subchannels of WBBM-TV (ATSC 3.0)
Subchannel	Short name	Programming
2.1	WBBM-NG	CBS
5.1	WMAQ-NG	NBC (WMAQ-TV)
9.1	WGN-NG	The CW (WGN-TV)
32.1	WFLD-NG	Fox (WFLD)
66.1	WGBO-NG	Univision (WGBO-DT)

Subchannel broadcast with digital rights management

In January 2024, CBS News and Stations announced that WBBM-TV would transition to the ATSC 3.0 standard, or known as "NextGenTV", as a lighthouse station for the Chicago area, starting February 5, 2024. WGN-TV, on UHF channel 19, now carries an ATSC 1.0 simulcast, which also allows the station to broadcast on the UHF band for the current majority of its viewers.

== See also ==
- The Magic Door – Jewish children's series that originated from WBBM-TV
