= John Kass =

American Columnist

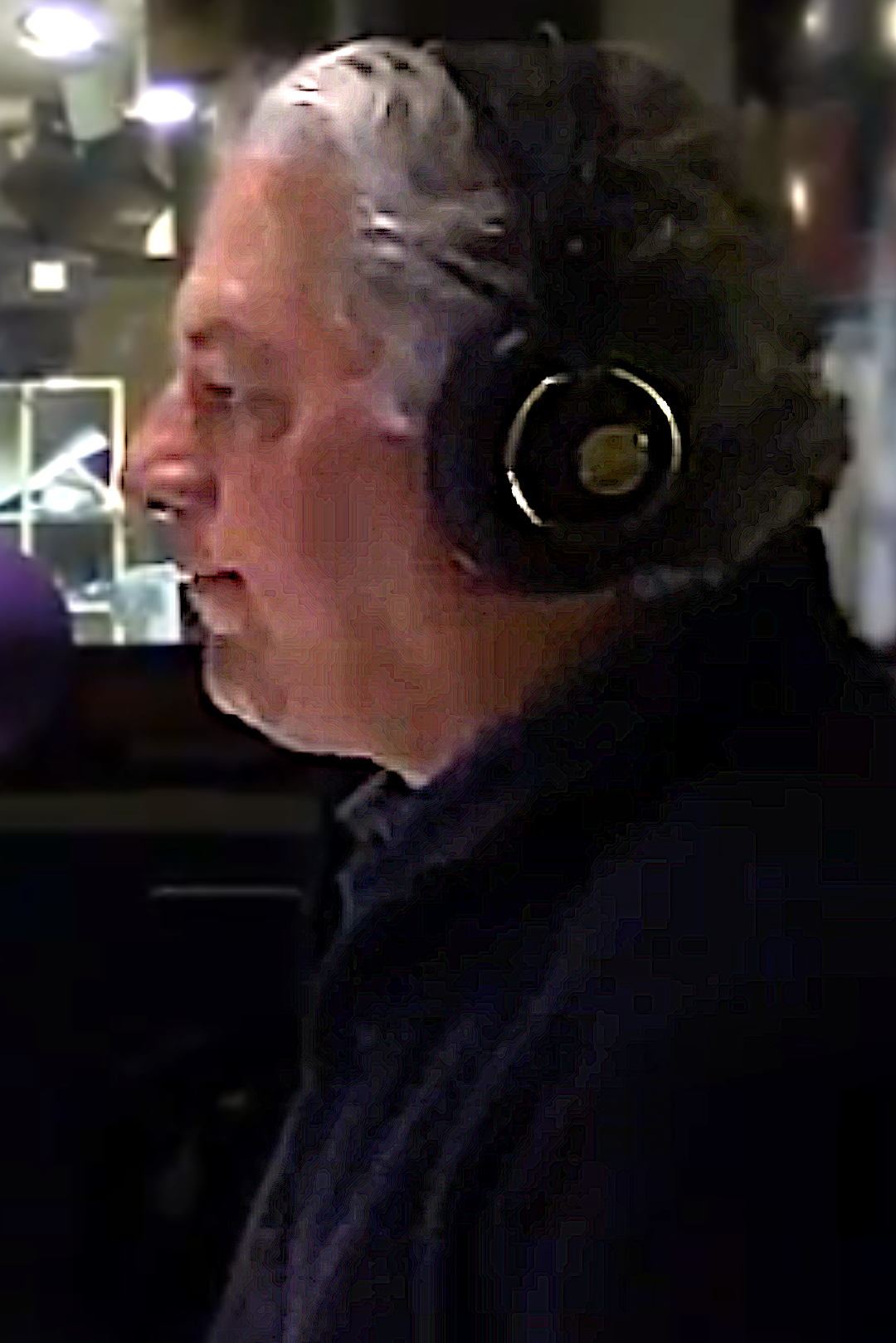
- Born: June 25, 1956 (age 70); Chicago, Illinois, U.S.
- Occupations: Columnist and editorial board member
- Spouse: Betty Castela (m. 1986)
- Children: 2

John Kass (born June 25, 1956) is an American columnist and former editorial board member for the Chicago Tribune and radio broadcaster. Until summer 2020, he spent nearly four decades at the Tribune and his opinion pieces regularly appeared on the prominent page 2 of the main news section of the Tribune, instead of on the opinion/editorial pages; this is the spot formerly occupied by Mike Royko.

== Early life and education ==
His Tribune biography reports Kass as the son of a Greek immigrant grocer. Kass was born on the South Side of Chicago, and grew up there and in the Chicago suburb of Oak Lawn. He graduated from Harold L. Richards High School in the class of 1974, and was a member of the varsity football team and the yearbook staff. He studied film at Columbia College in Chicago and worked on the student newspaper, though he never graduated.

== Career ==
Kass worked as an intern and later a reporter at the Daily Calumet, and worked from 1980 to June 2021 for the Tribune. He regularly covered political topics for the newspaper. His columns are syndicated by Tribune Content Agency. Kass also writes about lighter topics, particularly beer can chicken.

Kass hosted, first with Jake Hartford and later Lauren Cohn, a weekday morning talk-radio program on Cumulus Media-owned WLS-AM. His last show was February 26, 2015.

In June 2021, Kass took the buyout offer at the Chicago Tribune, after 38 years at the paper.

Following his departure from the Chicago Tribune, Kass continued to publish his perspectives on Chicago city, Illinois state and national politics and culture on his self-published webpage JohnKassNews.com. On October 25^{th} 2026, Kass announced that after conversation with his family that he would be "winding down" his web page with publishing ending after Thanksgiving 2026.

== Awards ==
Scripps Howard Foundation National Journalism Award for Commentary (for 2003)

Society of Professional Journalists Sigma Delta Chi Award for General Column Writing (2003)

== Family ==
Kass married Betty Castela in Oak Lawn's St. Nicholas Greek Orthodox Church in 1986. They have twin sons and currently live in Saint John, Indiana.
