= KRTV (Arkansas) =

Little Rock, Arkansas; United States
- Channels: Analog: 17 (UHF)

Programming
- Affiliations: CBS, ABC, DuMont Television Network, NBC

Ownership
- Owner: Little Rock Telecasters, Inc.

History
- First air date: April 5, 1953
- Last air date: March 31, 1954; (360 days)

KRTV (channel 17) was a television station in Little Rock, Arkansas, United States. The first television station in Arkansas, KRTV operated from April 1953 to March 1954. Its early demise was attributed to economic factors that made it impossible to compete with very high frequency (VHF) stations that signed on after KRTV. One of these stations, KATV (channel 7, then located in Pine Bluff), purchased KRTV's studio facility and assumed its personnel, a prelude to KATV itself moving to Little Rock in 1958.

== History ==
Little Rock Telecasters, a company half-owned by newspaper man Donald W. Reynolds and half by other investors from Texas (E. H. Rowley of Dallas and Kenyon Brown of Wichita Falls), applied for a construction permit to build an ultra high frequency (UHF) television station in the city in August 1952. A commercial television station permit, the first in the state of Arkansas, was granted on September 18, 1952. By December, the Prospect Theater, a movie house on Beech Street, was selected to be converted into KRTV's studio. Work on the station's tower was beset by a rainy March as well as opposition from neighborhood homeowners, one of whom called the mast "unsightly, offensive, and dangerous" and claimed it was responsible for "a bad effect on the peace and health of the citizens".

After a number of delays, KRTV debuted on April 5, 1953—Easter Sunday—as the first television station in Arkansas. Though CBS was KRTV's basic network affiliation, channel 17 aired programming from all four networks at the time—CBS, NBC, ABC, and DuMont. The station also presented local shows such as Parker's Den, hosted by KLRA disc jockey Bob Parker. That September, the station increased its effective radiated power tenfold from 2,100 to 21,000 watts with the installation of new equipment. The fall also saw a change in ownership interests within Little Rock Telecasters, as Rowley-Brown Broadcasting acquired all of Reynolds's 50 percent interest, and the installation of network coaxial cable to Little Rock, allowing the station to carry the 1953 World Series live.

Central Arkansas gained a second television station in December 1953. Broadcasting from Pine Bluff, KATV (channel 7) promised city-grade coverage of Little Rock. By the start of 1954, the picture was clear. Little Rock's first VHF station, KARK-TV (channel 4), was coming to air at some point in the coming months, which would give central Arkansas two operating VHF outlets plus KRTV; in addition, KRTV would lose its NBC affiliation to KARK-TV, whose radio companion KARK was NBC's longtime Little Rock outlet. This did not take into account VHF channel 11, still in comparative hearing. On the 10 p.m. newscast of KATV on March 7, it was announced that the two stations would combine in what was described as a "merger", with KRTV going off the air and its facilities and personnel becoming KATV's Little Rock studio, connected by coaxial cable and microwave to its transmitter. In actuality, the deal was a $400,000 sale—"lock, stock and tower"—of the station, minus its license and the tower (which was to be dismantled).

Beginning April 1, two daily news programs and other fare for KATV began broadcasting from the Little Rock studios. For two weeks, no television station licensed to Little Rock was on the air; this changed when KARK-TV signed on April 15.

The KATV Little Rock studios burned to the ground on the morning of November 1, 1957. The station rebuilt at another site; in July 1958, it was approved to change its city of license from Pine Bluff to Little Rock, and that October, the station completed the move.
