= Anne Pressly =

American news anchor (1982–2008)

Anne Sparkman Pressly
- Born: August 28, 1982; Beaufort, South Carolina, U.S.
- Died: October 25, 2008 (aged 26); Little Rock, Arkansas, U.S.
- Education: Rhodes College- Bachelor's degree in Political Science
- Occupations: News anchor, Actress
- Notable credit: KATV Reporter

Anne Pressly (August 28, 1982 – October 25, 2008) was an American news anchor for KATV Channel 7 in Little Rock, Arkansas. She was born in Beaufort, South Carolina and grew up in Greenville. She moved to Little Rock during her high school junior year when her mother remarried. On October 20, 2008, she was brutally attacked during a robbery at her home and died five days later.

== Biography ==
After earning her B.A. in Political Science from Rhodes College in Memphis, Tennessee, Pressly was hired at KATV in May 2004 to produce Good Morning Arkansas and report for MidDay Arkansas and Saturday Daybreak. She was promoted to a full-time reporter position in November 2004.

Pressley's most notable interview was with Vice President Dick Cheney.

A chance encounter with a casting director while working on a story helped her land a small role as Candice Black, a conservative commentator, in Oliver Stone's 2008 film W.

== Attack and death ==
Murder of Anne Pressly
- Date: October 20, 2008
- Time: before 4:30 a.m. CDT
- Location: Little Rock, Arkansas
- Suspects: Curtis Lavelle Vance
- Charges: Capital murder Residential burglary Rape; Theft of property
- Verdict: Guilty on all four counts Sentenced to life in prison without parole on November 12, 2009

Anne Pressly was found at 4:30 a.m. on October 20, 2008, a half-hour before she was due to appear on the station's Daybreak program. The Little Rock Police Department were alerted by her mother, Patricia Cannady, when Pressly did not answer her wake-up call. Cannady found Pressly unresponsive in her bed with injuries sustained to her head and upper body consistent with a beating. She had been raped, her left hand had been broken, and her face had been crushed beyond recognition. The attacker took her laptop computer, her handbag with a credit card, and little else.

=== Robbery ===
Little Rock Police Department spokesman Cassandra Davis said police did not believe that she was intentionally targeted, but robbery was the suspected motive after her purse was discovered missing. Her credit card was used at a service station several miles away, sometime after Cannady had discovered her daughter.

Pressly owned two Cocker Spaniels and it was theorized the attacker gained entrance to her home via a dog door.

=== Hospitalization and death ===
Pressly was hospitalized at St. Vincent Infirmary Medical Center and died five days later on October 25, 2008.

On the evening of her death, Pressly's mother and stepfather released a statement:

We are profoundly saddened to tell you that our dear Anne has lost her struggle for life. It was our hope, as was yours, that Anne would overcome the injuries inflicted upon her in the brutal attack at her home. We were with her in her last moments, and although our hearts are broken, we are at the same time comforted by our faith knowing that Anne is now with our Heavenly Father. The outpouring of compassion we have received is truly a testament to the way in which Anne has touched so many people in a positive way. Thank you for your prayers and your many acts of kindness. We are grateful for the wonderful care Anne received from her doctors, nurses and others at St. Vincent. Our lives will not be the same without her. We ask that you continue to pray for us as we struggle to move forward without our dear sweet daughter. We also ask that you give us the privacy we need at this very difficult time.

=== Memorial service and reward ===
A memorial service for Pressly was scheduled for October 30, 2008. KATV set up a reward fund for information on Pressly's murder and the fund exceeded $50,000. Her family requested that either contributions be made to the fund or a scholarship fund established in her name.

Pressly's alma mater, Rhodes College, expressed a desire to honor her by either establishing a memorial, setting up a scholarship, or supporting her favorite charity.

=== Perpetrator ===
On November 26, 2008, police in Little Rock, Arkansas arrested Curtis Lavelle Vance for the murder of Pressly. On November 11, 2009, Vance was convicted of capital murder, residential burglary, rape and theft of property.

Police believe Vance committed a crime of opportunity, and they found no link between Pressly's public profession and her attack. The day following his conviction, Vance was sentenced to life in prison without parole.

After Vance's sentencing, an interview was being conducted outside the courtroom with David Bazzell, a local radio personality and a friend of Pressly. Bazzell stated that he felt justice had been carried out. Vance's enraged mother was standing nearby and overheard the comment, shouting at Bazzell, "No it wasn't! No it wasn't! My son is innocent! No justice here today!" DNA evidence had proven that Vance was Pressly's rapist and attacker.

The Arkansas Supreme Court rejected Vance's appeal on June 2, 2011.

Vance was also charged with the kidnapping and rape of Kristen Edwards on April 21, 2008, at her home in Marianna, Arkansas. Before he fled with Edwards, the rapist stole her cell phone and charger, a video and $3 – all the cash she had with her at the time. Vance was subjected to a swab test for his DNA and all 16 genetic markers the test compared matched the DNA recovered from the semen in Edwards's abduction. During the trial, Vance admitted under questioning that he had been inside Edwards's home on the morning of the kidnapping, although he claimed that it was because "there were mobs roaming the streets in Little Rock" that morning and he was afraid. Despite his admission of being in the victim's home, her being brutally raped and forced from her home at gunpoint that morning, and the statistically negligible chance of his DNA matching anyone else's, the jury was hung, resulting in a mistrial.
