= John Callaway =

American journalist

John Callaway (August 22, 1936 – June 23, 2009) was an American journalist, who appeared on radio and television as a host, interviewer and moderator. He was the original host of Chicago Tonight, a nightly news program broadcast on the Chicago, Illinois television station WTTW, serving in that role from 1984 to 1999.

== Early life ==
John Callaway was born and raised in New Martinsville, West Virginia, in 1936. While John was growing up, his father owned a weekly newspaper. After his father became ill, hospital bills left him unable to help pay for college. Callaway had already accrued $800 in loans and a job as a dishwasher could not cover his expenses. He dropped out of Ohio Wesleyan University after a little more than a year in college, telling the dean that he was dropping out of school temporarily and was hoping to earn enough money at the steel mills in the Chicago area to pay for the remainder of his college studies. The dean gave him $50, almost all of which was spent until he had only 71 cents left. He hitchhiked to Chicago through Ohio and Indiana, and was given a train ticket on the South Shore Line, arriving at Randolph Street Station on February 6, 1956, with the 71 cents in his pocket and immediately fell in love with the city.

He worked in a series of odd jobs, and was told that the steel mill idea wouldn't work out. He took acting classes at night, which lasted until his instructor told him "Callaway, you're the worst actor I've ever had the pleasure of working with." He went on to tell him about a position that would fit with his father's career, where reporters could enjoy the free food available at political dinners.

== Broadcasting ==
This led Callaway to his first media job, at Chicago's City News Bureau, where he was employed as a police reporter. He was hired in 1957 by WBBM-TV and its associated radio stations, a CBS affiliate, as a reporter and documentary producer. There he won several national awards for The House Divided, a 13-segment documentary on the civil rights movement in the United States. As WBBM's News Director, he oversaw the station's 1968 conversion to an all-news radio format. He came back to Chicago in 1973 after being employed in New York City as a vice president of CBS Radio, and became the WBBM-TV lead reporter.

Callaway helped create Chicago Tonight in 1984, a program intended to be "the second half of the news," in which the issues of the day could be discussed. The first airing included a half-hour-long interview with then Mayor of Chicago Harold Washington. Over the years, guests of Callaway on the program included Alan Alda, James Baldwin, Tom Brokaw, Aaron Copland, Howard Cosell, Mike Ditka, Helen Hayes, Henry Kissinger, Norman Mailer, Leontyne Price, Andy Rooney, Tim Russert, Jonas Salk, John Updike, Mike Wallace and Oprah Winfrey. He ended his role as the show's host in 1999, but continued as host and senior editor of Chicago Stories and the Friday Night interview series on WTTW, and from 2003, as host of a monthly panel discussion at the Pritzker Military Museum & Library in Chicago, Front & Center with John Callaway.

== Awards and recognition ==
Over the course of his career, Callaway was recognized with the Peabody Award and 16 Emmys.

He received honorary doctorate degrees from ten colleges, including Loyola University Chicago, Northwestern University and the John Marshall School of Law.

Local newspapers called him "Chicago Television's No. 1 Interviewer" (Chicago Tribune) and "Chicago television's conscience", considered by his peers as "the best interviewer on television" (Chicago Sun-Times). He was recognized by The Atlanta Journal-Constitution as "hands down, the best on-air interviewer in the land". Asked by Johnny Carson who he thought was the best interviewer, William F. Buckley cited "That chubby fellow in Chicago".

== Personal ==
Callaway died at age 72 after suffering a heart attack in a store in Racine, Wisconsin on June 23, 2009. He was survived by his wife Sandra and daughters Ann Hampton Callaway and Liz Callaway; Ann is a cabaret singer, composer and entertainer and Liz is a Broadway actress and singer.

Callaway was featured in a one-man show in Chicago which included both monologues about current politics, as well as his "Tormesque" singing voice, as well as performances with his talented daughters, Ann and Liz. Callaway wrote and performed two autobiographical one-man shows, Life is...Maintenance and John Callaway Tonight, and published an autobiography in 1994, The Thing of It Is. He frequently sang at Chicago-area events, often accompanied on piano by his long-time colleague Paul Nebenzahl.
