= Paul Eells =

American sportscaster (1935–2006)

- Born: Paul Irving Eells; September 24, 1935; Iowa City, Iowa, U.S.
- Died: July 31, 2006 (aged 70); Russellville, Arkansas, U.S.
- Occupation: Sportscaster
- Sports commentary career
- Genre: Play-by-play
- Sport(s): College Football, College Basketball

Paul Eells (September 24, 1935 – July 31, 2006) was an American sportscaster.

He was the "Voice of the Razorbacks", broadcasting University of Arkansas basketball games on television and (after 1978) football games on radio. Eells was also sports director at KATV in Little Rock, Arkansas, the Allbritton Communications Company owned ABC-affiliated television station in that market.

Eells grew up in Mechanicsville, Iowa and graduated from the University of Iowa. Eells went to Iowa on a baseball scholarship but there found his love in radio. A communications major, Eells soon found himself in television at WMT in Cedar Rapids. There he worked his way up to booth anchor and would eventually hold the title of "Voice of the Iowa Hawkeyes" for five years.

Eells moved to Nashville, Tennessee in 1967. During his 10-year stay in Nashville, he was Sports Director at WSM-TV (later WSMV-TV) and play-by-play announcer of Vanderbilt Commodores football and basketball on radio. While in Nashville, Eells' trademark radio call was "Holy Smokes."

In 1978, he moved to central Arkansas to become sports director at KATV in Little Rock; radio play-by-play announcer for the Razorbacks football team; TV play-by-play announcer for the Razorbacks basketball team; and host of the TV football and basketball Razorbacks coaches shows. He was known statewide for his broadcasting voice and his signature "Oh My" and "Touchdown Arkansas" radio calls.

Eells worked with several notable sports figures as color commentators while covering Arkansas Football, including Barry Switzer, former football coach of the Oklahoma Sooners and Dallas Cowboys as well as member of the 1964 National Championship Arkansas Razorbacks football team; Rick Schaeffer, former Sports Information Director for the University of Arkansas, Razorback historian, and author of several Razorback-themed books; and Keith Jackson, Arkansas native and former tight end for the Oklahoma Sooners, and later Philadelphia Eagles and Green Bay Packers of the NFL. Additionally, Eells spent several years working with ESPN commentator and former Razorback Jimmy Dykes as part of the locally syndicated Razorback Basketball non-conference television package.

During his time as "Voice of the Razorbacks", Eells became an iconic figure in the state of Arkansas, as is evidenced by the fact that Eells was inducted into the Arkansas Sports Hall of Fame in 2006. He was also named Arkansas Sportscaster of the Year 13 times, and was also honored several times with an Associated Press award for best sports play-by-play. Eells was routinely referred to as the "nicest man" in the state of Arkansas, according to numerous personal accounts aired on KATV-TV and printed in the Arkansas Democrat-Gazette in the days that followed Eells' death.

While returning home from a golf tournament on July 31, 2006, Eells died in an auto accident on Interstate 40 in Russellville, Arkansas at age 70. He lived in Maumelle, Arkansas at the time of his death.

In time for the first University of Arkansas football game of the 2006 season, Arkansas Governor Mike Huckabee proclaimed September 2, 2006 "Paul Eells Day". That night in a game against the USC Trojans, the Razorback Marching Band honored Eells by spelling his name during its halftime routine. Later that month in Arkansas' football game at Vanderbilt, Eells was honored before the game with a moment of silence. Eells was posthumously honored by the decision to name the home broadcast booth at Little Rock's War Memorial Stadium for both him and Jim Elder, long-time voice of the Arkansas Travelers and statistician for the Arkansas football radio broadcast crew. In addition, Eells is honored in the Press Box with a plaque on the Sports Media Legends Wall of Honor.

== Notable games called by Eells ==
- October 19, 1991—In the final Southwest Conference matchup between the Razorbacks and the Texas Longhorns prior to the Razorbacks' departure for the Southeastern Conference, the two teams met in Little Rock's War Memorial Stadium. -- Arkansas 14, Texas 13.
- November 13, 1999—dubbed "Redemption" by Arkansas fans, the Razorbacks avenged a prior year loss to Tennessee with a victory over the defending National Champions on a pass from Clint Stoerner to Anthony Lucas, ending Tennessee's hopes of a 2nd National Championship. -- Arkansas 28, Tennessee 24. The winning touchdown as called by Eells, remembered as his signature call of an Arkansas game – "Touchdown Arkansas!! Oh my! Lucas goes up, makes the catch, 23 yards, and the Hogs take the lead in this ball game 27-24." Arkansas would go on to convert an extra point to set the final margin.
- January 1, 2000—In the first College Football game of the millennium, former Southwest Conference rivals Arkansas and Texas met in the Cotton Bowl Classic in Dallas, Texas. Arkansas held Texas to a Cotton Bowl and school record 8 sacks and -27 yards rushing for the game en route to an upset win. -- Arkansas 27, Texas 6.
- November 3, 2001—In what was the longest overtime game in NCAA Football Bowl Subdivision (formerly NCAA Division I-A) history at the time, the Razorbacks won the game in 7 overtime periods over Eli Manning and the Ole Miss Rebels. -- Arkansas 58, Ole Miss 56. Said Eells on the final play of the game, "58-56, Manning, awaiting the snap, Armstead, Manning rolling out, going over the middle ... it is ... Arkansas wins! Arkansas wins! The two-point conversion falls short, despite the pass being complete, and the Hogs race on the field, in the longest overtime game in the history of I-A College Football."
- November 29, 2002—dubbed the "Miracle on Markham", in the final regular season game, Arkansas earned the SEC Western Division Championship and an appearance in the SEC Championship Game, on a last-second touchdown pass from Matt Jones to Decori Birmingham. -- Arkansas 21, LSU 20. The game-tying touchdown was punctuated by Eells' call of "Jones, now, throwing to the end zone... and...it is...complete! A touchdown! Oh my! I can't believe it! Thirty-one yards to Decori Birmingham in the back of the end zone, and this game is tied, 20-20!" Arkansas went on to convert a 35-yard extra point to win the game, after excessive celebration was called against the Hogs after the touchdown was scored.
- September 13, 2003—dubbed the "Ambush in Austin" by Arkansas fans, the Razorbacks defeated the Texas Longhorns in a battle of non-conference rivals. -- Arkansas 38, Texas 28. On a 46-yard touchdown run by Cedric Cobbs to put the Hogs ahead of their long-time rival 28-14, Eells – "The give to Cobbs, right up the middle...Cobbs at the 40, Cobbs at the 30, Cobbs at the 20, Cobbs at the 10, Touchdown Arkansas!!" with added emphasis and grit to his signature call. Arkansas out-rushed the Longhorns 265 to 62 yards en route to a 4–0 start to the 2003 season.
- November 1, 2003—In what is currently the longest overtime game in NCAA Football Bowl Subdivision (formerly NCAA Division I-A) history, the Razorbacks won the game in 7 overtime periods over Jared Lorenzen and the Kentucky Wildcats. -- Arkansas 71, Kentucky 63. Said Eells on the final play of the game, "There's a fumble, and the Hogs come up with it ... That's it! The ball game is over! Lorenzen was stopped short of the first down and lost the football and the Hogs came up with it, and in 7 overtimes in Lexington, Kentucky, Arkansas will go home finally with a smile on its face, 71-63."
