= Riverdale (Little Rock) =

Neighborhood of Little Rock, Arkansas

Coordinates: 34°45′59″N 92°18′32″W

Located adjacent to the Arkansas River, Riverdale is a neighborhood of Little Rock, Arkansas, situated in the north-central area of the city. It lies to the northeast and at a lower elevation from Pulaski Heights, and to the northwest of downtown.

Riverdale contains a considerable amount of warehouses in the eastern part of the neighborhood, served by Union Pacific rail lines that travel through the area. The warehouse section is flanked on the east by the corporate headquarters of Dillard's Department Stores, and is noted for a couple of larger gay nightclubs, Discovery and Triniti, as well as the landmark restaurant and bar, Cajun's Wharf, one of many such businesses with a long presence in Little Rock.

The neighborhood progresses westward toward shopping areas, office complexes, and upscale residential communities. Part of the lure to Riverdale in recent years for shoppers has been an increased emphasis on design-oriented businesses, with retailers offering antiques, ceramics, fine fabrics, plants and specialty lighting fixtures. Accompanying these shops is a popular mix of restaurants skewing toward Southern and Italian cuisine.

Beyond shopping venues, soccer fields and corporate towers inch the neighborhood toward the riverfront. Regional headquarters for telecommunications providers Verizon Communications and Windstream Communications, as well as the non-profit service organization Winrock International, are among the companies whose executives broker deals here, and KATV (channel 7) moved their studio facilities to a building along Riverfront in January 2023. A combination of gated communities, apartments and condominiums buffer the corporate corridor from Rebsamen Golf Course, the city's largest public golf course, and Murray Park to the far west along Riverfront Drive.
