= Chicago Tonight =

American television news program

- Genre: Television news magazine
- Theme music composer: Aesha Dominguez
- Country of origin: United States

Production
- Executive producer: Jay T. Smith
- Production location: Chicago, Illinois
- Camera setup: multi-camera
- Running time: 26:46 minutes

Original release
- Network: WTTW
- Release: April 24, 1984

Chicago Tonight is a television news program broadcast weeknights on WTTW in Chicago, United States. It reports primarily on local politics, education, business, culture, science, and health, with a mix of in-studio panel discussions, one-on-one interviews, and short documentary-style packages. On its website, it publishes additional news stories and features by staff reporters.

The show first aired on April 24, 1984 and was hosted by popular Chicago broadcast journalist John Callaway for 15 years, who continued contributing to the show until he died in 2009.

== Notable staff ==
- Paris Schutz – host
- Brandis Griffith Friedman – Chief Correspondent and Anchor, as of 2026
- Phil Ponce – host
- Carol Marin – contributor
