= Rob Johnson (news anchor) =

American former news anchor (born 1968)

- Born: April 1, 1968 (age 57)
- Education: DePauw University (BA)
- Occupation: Communications consultant
- Television: KALB-TV; KLFY-TV; KATV; KPRC-TV; WLS-TV; WBBM-TV
- Spouse: Stacey Johnson
- Children: 1

Robert S. Johnson (born April 1, 1968) is an American communications consultant who was previously a news anchor at WBBM-TV in Chicago.

== Early life and education ==
Johnson went to grade school in St. Louis, Missouri. Johnson and his family moved to Brussels, Belgium when he was in 8th grade, and Johnson graduated from the International School of Brussels in 1986. Johnson earned a bachelor's degree in communications from DePauw University in Greencastle, Indiana in 1990. He is a graduate brother of DePauw's Lambda chapter of Phi Gamma Delta fraternity.

== Professional career ==
He joined WBBM-TV in Chicago in August 2006 from WLS-TV where he had worked since 1998 as weekend anchor and reporter. He co-anchored the evening news until March 2019.

In October 1998, Johnson joined WLS-TV in Chicago as a weekend news anchor and general assignment reporter. In August 2006, he subsequently moved to WBBM-TV as news anchor and as a general assignment reporter. In June 2007, the station promoted Johnson to be its evening news anchor. He ultimately teamed with Irika Sargent on the weeknight news. On March 13, 2019, CBS Chicago announced that his contract with the station would not be renewed.

He subsequently joined a company as a communications consultant.

== Personal ==
Johnson, his wife Stacey, and son live in Hinsdale, Illinois.
