= Rafer Weigel =

American broadcast journalist (born 1969)

- Born: Rafer Brian Weigel; May 5, 1969 (age 57); Evanston, Illinois, U.S.
- Education: University of Illinois at Urbana-Champaign
- Occupation: Journalist
- Known for: Morning Express with Robin Meade (2008-2011)
- Spouse: Tiffany Weigel (m. 2002, divorced)
- Children: 1
- Parent: Tim Weigel (father)
- Relatives: Jenniffer Weigel (sister)

Rafer Brian Weigel (born May 5, 1969) is an American broadcast journalist who most recently was an early morning weekday news anchor and general assignment reporter at WFLD-Channel 32 in Chicago. Formerly, he was the weekend sports anchor and reporter at WLS-TV in Chicago, the sports anchor for CNN HLN’s Morning Express with Robin Meade and also an actor.

== Background ==
Weigel grew up in a journalism household in Evanston, Illinois, the son of the Chicago television sportscaster and newspaper columnist Tim Weigel and former WGN Radio news anchor Kathy Worthington. He is the grandson of Weigel Broadcasting founder and former Lawrence Welk radio announcer John Jacob Weigel. Weigel has two sisters, Jenniffer Weigel, a former Chicago television news anchor and published author, and Teddi, who began high school in 2008.

He was married to photographer Tiffany Weigel. They had their first child, son Heathcliff John Weigel, on November 20, 2009. He later divorced Tiffany and was later engaged to Fox 2, St. Louis morning news anchor, Margie Ellisor. He was later shortly engaged to a producer at KUSI, San Diego.

Weigel is named after Olympian Rafer Johnson.

Growing up, Weigel regularly spent time among journalists and media personalities, including columnist Mike Royko, Studs Terkel, Steve Dahl, Gene Siskel and Richard Roeper. His father Tim began his career as a newspaper sportswriter and eventually became a popular Chicago sports and news anchor. He died of cancer at the age of 55 in 2001. Weigel decided to follow in his father's footsteps after his death.

Weigel graduated in 1987 from Evanston Township High School, where he performed on stage with the Piven Theatre Workshop's Young People's company, which featured such notables as John Cusack, Joan Cusack and Jeremy Piven. He worked summers as an intern for his father at WLS-TV. Weigel continued his education at the University of Illinois at Urbana-Champaign, graduating with a degree in theatre in 1992 after finishing his studies in London.

== Career ==
=== Acting ===
Weigel's first acting job was with Chicago's Steppenwolf Theatre as the title role in "Master Harold"...and the Boys and worked with others such as The Wisdom Bridge, Bailiwick, and Organic theatres. His first television role was a small part on the locally filmed TV show The Untouchables. In 1993, Weigel was hired for a news magazine show featuring younger journalists and brought out to Hollywood. Shortly thereafter, Weigel was hired as an on-camera host for VH1 where he joined future Headline News colleague A.J. Hammer.

In 1995, Weigel returned to Hollywood, landing small speaking roles on ER and Party of Five, and guest starring on JAG, Charmed, and the former Vengeance Unlimited. In 1997, Weigel was hired as a series regular on the NBC sitcom Jenny, starring former fellow Chicagoan Jenny McCarthy. The series lasted only one season. During this year he also played the Dark Jedi Yun in the video game Star Wars Jedi Knight: Dark Forces II. Soon thereafter, Weigel began his film career in the lead role opposite William Shatner and Eric McCormack in the cult movie Free Enterprise, and then alongside Emilio Estevez and Charlie Sheen in the Showtime film Rated X.

=== Journalism ===
After his father died in 2001, he began his pursuit of a career in journalism and returned to Chicago. He wrote an essay after his father's death that ran in the Chicago Sun-Times that opened the door for him as a freelance writer covering high school sports. Weigel covered games all over the Chicago area and wrote regular features on local high school athletes. He also hosted a weekly radio show on WCKG called "Celebrity Rock." A year later, he and his wife, Tiffany, relocated back to Los Angeles, where he worked as a clerk in the sports department at The Los Angeles Times. He began writing articles for The Times on a freelance basis and a year later was hired full-time as a high school sports staff writer.

=== Television ===
Weigel's first on-camera journalism job came in 2005 as a freelance reporter for KUSI in San Diego for the weekend morning show—doing live remotes at events as well as covering breaking news. He continued working nights at The L.A. Times and mornings for the TV station. In February 2006, he was hired by the CBS-owned and operated station KOVR in Sacramento as a general assignment reporter, covering breaking news, politics and national stories like the Lake Tahoe wildfires and wayward whales Delta and Dawn.

In February 2008, Weigel joined the cast of the already-successful morning show Morning Express with Robin Meade. Weigel and the CNN sports team extensively covered the 2008 Summer Olympics in Beijing. In March 2011, Weigel became the new weekend sports anchor and reporter at WLS Channel 7 in Chicago, a station where his father spent 17 years as an anchor. He replaced Ryan Chiaverini, who became co-host of Channel 7's morning show "Windy City Live," a role Weigel himself had been under consideration for. Weigel decided to go back to his "news" roots and in October 2014 accepted the anchor role for the 6pm and 10pm shows Monday-Friday in St. Louis at the Fox affiliate KTVI, Channel 2.

On September 1, 2017, Weigel joined WFLD-TV in Chicago as a weekend evening news anchor and general assignment reporter. He was promoted to weekday morning news anchor in August of 2018.

Weigel left Fox 32 in February of 2020 to start his own Media, Public Relations and Marketing Company, The Weigel Media Group.
