= Kathy Brock =

American journalist

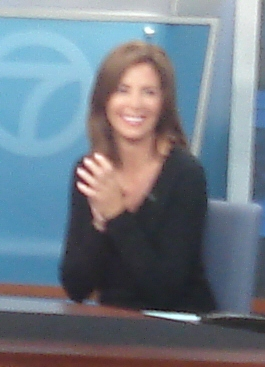
- Brock at the WLS-TV news desk in September 2006
- Born: July 24, 1959 (age 67); Pasco, Washington, United States
- Education: Washington State University
- Occupation: News Anchor at ABC 7 Chicago
- Years active: 1980–2018
- Spouse: Douglas P. Regan

Kathy Brock (born July 24, 1959) is an American former news anchor at WLS-TV, Chicago's ABC affiliate. She was a co-anchor of the station's 6 pm and 10 pm news broadcasts alongside Alan Krashesky.

== Personal life and education ==
Brock grew up working on the family farm in Pasco, Washington. She graduated from Pasco High School in 1977. Brock later received her bachelor's degree in journalism from Washington State University, where she was president of her sorority, Kappa Kappa Gamma and served as Rush Chairman for the Intra Fraternity Council. Brock now resides in Florida with her husband Douglas P. Regan, Co-Chairman and Founding Partner of Cresset. She has two sons, Colton and Matthew Staab, and two step-daughters, Maggie and Katie Regan.

== Career ==
Before joining ABC 7 Chicago, Brock spent six years as an anchor/reporter at KUTV-TV in Salt Lake City, Utah. She also worked at KBCI-TV in Boise, Idaho; KEPR-TV, in Pasco, Washington; and KWSU-TV in Pullman, Washington.

Brock joined WLS-TV in 1990 as a co-anchor of the morning newscast with Alan Krashesky. From 1993 to 1998, she co-anchored the 6 pm newscast with Floyd Kalber. Since 1998, she has co-anchored it with Krashesky. In 2003, after Diann Burns left ABC 7, Brock was promoted to the 10 pm newscast alongside Ron Magers. This is currently the No. 1 rated and most watched newscast in Chicago. After 13 years together, Magers retired in May 2016 and Brock teamed up at 10 with her previous co-anchor Krashesky.

On May 30, 2018, media critic Robert Feder reported that Brock is stepping away from ABC7 after 28 years at the station. In her note to colleagues, she said "I want to explore other passions and see what life's like off the night shift." On June 12, 2018, current 5pm and 7pm anchor and 10pm contributing anchor Cheryl Burton was named Brock's successor on the 10pm show. 11am and 4pm anchor Judy Hsu was named the new 6pm anchor.
