= Joel Daly =

American news anchor (1934–2020)

- Daly in 1972
- Born: August 21, 1934; Great Falls, Montana, U.S.
- Died: October 21, 2020 (aged 86); La Grange, Illinois, U.S.
- Education: Yale University
- Occupation: News anchor – ABC 7 Chicago (WLS-TV) (1967–2005)
- Years active: 1960–2005
- Spouse: Suzon Daly (m. 1953; died 2015)
- Children: 3

Joel Daly (August 21, 1934 – October 22, 2020) was an American news anchor, most known for serving as an anchor for WLS-TV (an ABC-affiliate) in Chicago, Illinois, for 38 years from 1967 to 2005. Daly served as co-anchor on the 4 pm news broadcast alongside Linda Yu from January 1985 until his retirement in May 2005. Daly was inducted into the Silver Circle, a group of elite Chicago broadcasters, in 2003. Following his retirement from news broadcasting in 2005, from March 2007 until October 2013, Daly served as spokesperson for Chicago's Cook County federal courthouse.

== Early life ==
Joel Daly was born August 21, 1934, in Great Falls, Montana, and was raised in Washington state. He graduated magna cum laude from Yale University in 1956.

== Career ==
Four years after finishing college, Daly joined WJW-TV in Cleveland in early 1960. Daly served as co-anchor with Doug Adair, and the two became the first co-anchor news team in the United States.

=== WLS–TV Chicago (1967–2005) ===
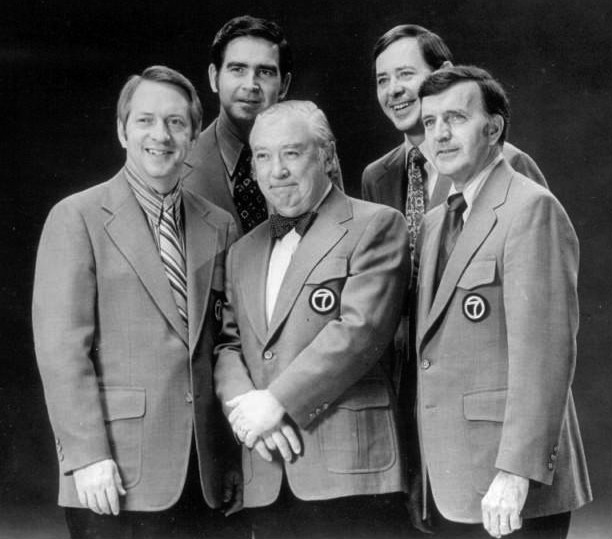
Eyewitness News team, 1972. Back, from left: anchor John Drury, anchor Joel Daly. Front, from left: weatherman John Coleman, anchor Fahey Flynn, sportscaster Bill Frink

In 1967, both Daly and Adair were hired by WBKB-TV in Chicago. However, Adair stayed in Cleveland for personal and contractual reasons. In Chicago, Daly began doing a solo newscast called Newsnight. In 1968, about the time the station was renamed WLS-TV, Daly was paired with Fahey Flynn, and the two became the highest-rated evening news team in the city, winning a local Emmy Award after just one year on the air. Daly and Flynn popularized a presentation style known to critics as "happy talk". Unlike most presenters of the time, who delivered the news in an austere, authoritative fashion, Daly and Flynn mixed in playful banter as they segued from one topic to another. Daly later recalled, "We came down from Olympus, and we just became regular people talking to regular people. It's the best form of communication." News presenters across the country soon began emulating Daly and Flynn, sometimes to the duo's chagrin, as when other presenters became too jokey or unfocused. Daly himself did not use the phrase "happy talk" to describe his style, noting, "We always took the news seriously, if we didn't always take ourselves too seriously". After Flynn's death in 1983, Daly briefly co-anchored the 10:00 news with Mary Ann Childers. Daly then joined Oprah Winfrey to co-anchor WLS-TV's 4:00 pm news broadcast. Winfrey was replaced by Linda Yu after only weeks on the air. Daly remained there until May 2005, when he announced that he would step down as anchor to pursue other interests. Alan Krashesky became the new 4:00 pm anchor. After that, he occasionally appeared on newscasts to report on legal matters, and also hosted parades for the channel. Daly was inducted into the Chicago Journalism Hall of Fame in 2001 and received the first Illinois Broadcast Pioneer Award in 2008. He won five Emmys over the course of his career.

== Other work ==
In 1988, Joel Daly received a Juris Doctor from Chicago-Kent College of Law after four years of taking evening classes. He became director of external relations at the John Marshall Law School in 2005, and also taught some classes there.

In 2007, Daly was named a spokesperson for the U.S. District Court in Chicago.

One of Daly's other interests was acting. In 1994 he played Atticus Finch in a stage adaptation of To Kill a Mockingbird, and in 2000 he starred as Patsy McCall in a production of William J. Kennedy's Grand View. He played a news reporter in the 2006 film Death of a President, which portrays the fictional assassination of George W. Bush. Daly said he did not regret his involvement, saying, "It's a gutsy undertaking to do the fictional assassination of a living president who's still in office. It's something that's in the American psyche. So dealing with this in a fictional forum – albeit a realistic one – is perhaps a purgative," he told the Chicago Sun-Times.

Daly also dabbled in music, especially country music and yodeling. He sang with a group called The Sundowners and occasionally wrote his own songs. His autobiography, The Daly News, was published by Eckhartz Press in 2014.

== Personal life ==
Daly met and married Suzon "Sue" Weiss in 1955. They had three children, two sons (Doug and Scott) and one daughter (Kelly). Both sons predeceased him; Scott died in his early 40s after struggling with addiction, while Doug died in his early 50s after suffering an asthmatic seizure.

Daly died on October 22, 2020, at his home in La Grange, Illinois. He was 86 years old and had suffered from vascular Parkinsonism in the time leading up to his death.
