= Tommy Winkler =

American internet personality (born 2001)

- Born: June 10, 2001 (age 25)
- Other name: The King of Crunch
- Occupations: YouTuber; TikToker
- Years active: 2020–present
- Spouse: Jessica Pappas (2026–present)

Thomas Allen "Tommy" Winkler, (born June 10, 2001) known online as The Food Guy, or The King of Crunch is an American internet personality known for mukbangs and TikTok food trends.

== Career ==
Before starting a TikTok account, Winkler was a college student who had made comedy sketches and vlogged with his older brother. Winkler got his start on TikTok sometime in 2020 or 2021, eating food and doing videos such as "I can only eat X for an entire day". He started a TikTok series called "Food Hacks", which showed you how to make food out of things you have at home. In 2026, he signed with Independent Artist Group. Winkler joined Ryan Chiaverini on Windy City Live for a global taste tour where they tried food inspired by countries playing in the FIFA World Cup.

== Personal life ==
Winkler is married to his wife, Jessica Pappas, and they are expecting a child. Winkler and his wife met when they were both college students during COVID-19.
