= Ron Magers =

American former news anchor (born 1944)

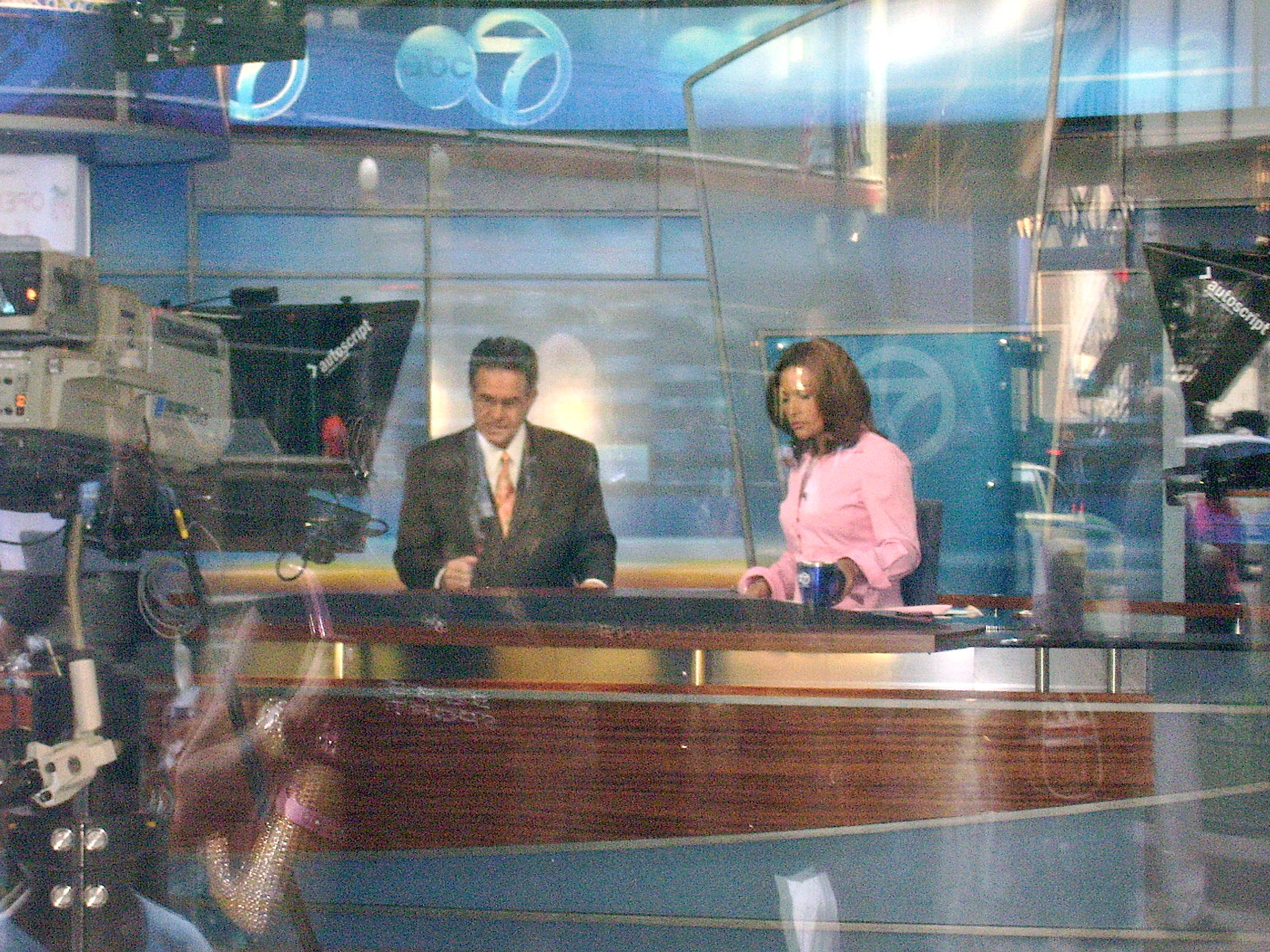
- Magers (left) and Cheryl Burton (right) broadcasting the ABC 7 Chicago's 5 p.m. weekday news, circa 2011.
- Born: August 27, 1944 (age 81); San Bernardino, California, U.S.
- Occupations: News Anchor – ABC 7 Chicago (1998–2016); WMAQ-TV (1981–1998)
- Years active: 1965–2016
- Relatives: Paul Magers

Ron Magers (born August 27, 1944) is a former American news anchor. Magers worked for WLS-TV, the ABC owned-and-operated station in Chicago, Illinois, where he co-anchored the top-rated 5:00 p.m. and 10:00 p.m. broadcasts with Cheryl Burton and Kathy Brock, respectively. Magers is the brother of Paul Magers, a former television anchor and reporter for KCBS-TV, the CBS owned-and-operated station in Los Angeles.

== Early life and career ==
Born in San Bernardino, California, Magers grew up in Cordova, Alaska and Ellensburg, Washington. Magers gained early broadcasting experience as a high school student in Toppenish, Washington, when he began to host radio shows as a part-time job. He began his professional career in television in 1965, when he joined KEZI-TV in Eugene, Oregon as a reporter and news contributor. He later produced and anchored the 11 p.m. newscast at KGW-TV in Portland, Ore. (1967–68). From 1968-74, Magers worked as a reporter and anchor at KPIX-TV in San Francisco, Calif. In 1971, he hosted a weekly Group W 30-minute nationally syndicated program, titled, "Ron Magers Electric Impressions".

== Minneapolis – Saint Paul ==
After moving to Minnesota, Magers was hired as the principal anchor for KSTP-TV, the ABC (formerly NBC) affiliate in Minneapolis – Saint Paul from 1974 to 1981.

== Chicago ==
From 1981 to 1997, Magers co-anchored the 5, 6, and 10 p.m. newscasts of WMAQ-TV. Magers and then co-anchor Carol Marin made national headlines in early May 1997 when they left Channel 5. The decision to leave was in protest of the station's hiring of Jerry Springer as commentator for the 10:00 p.m. newscasts. WMAQ management allowed both anchors an early release from their contracts. Both thought that the addition of Springer would have given the broadcast an unnecessary tabloid feel. Springer only made two commentaries before he too left his position as contributor.

Magers joined WLS in 1998 as a 5:00 p.m. anchor alongside Diann Burns. He became co-anchor of the 10:00 p.m. newscasts in 2002, after the retirement of long-time anchor John Drury. Magers has appeared in a feature segment and was a commentator on The Roe Conn Show on WLS (AM) since 1997, with a gap of several months in 2009/10 because of the bankruptcy of WLS's parent company. He was rehired following the station's sale. On May 25, 2016 Magers retired from ABC with a final late evening newscast with tributes from staff and colleagues. ABC7 anchor Alan Krashesky succeeded Magers at 5:00 p.m. alongside Cheryl Burton and alongside Kathy Brock at 6:00 and 10:00 p.m.

== Awards ==
Magers has won numerous awards including six Chicago Emmy Awards, a Peter Lisagor Award and a National Press Club citation. In addition, he has won an Associated Press award, an Illinois Broadcasters Association award, the Ohio State Award, and an Ethics Award from the Society of Professional Journalists.
