= Cheryl Burton =

American news anchor

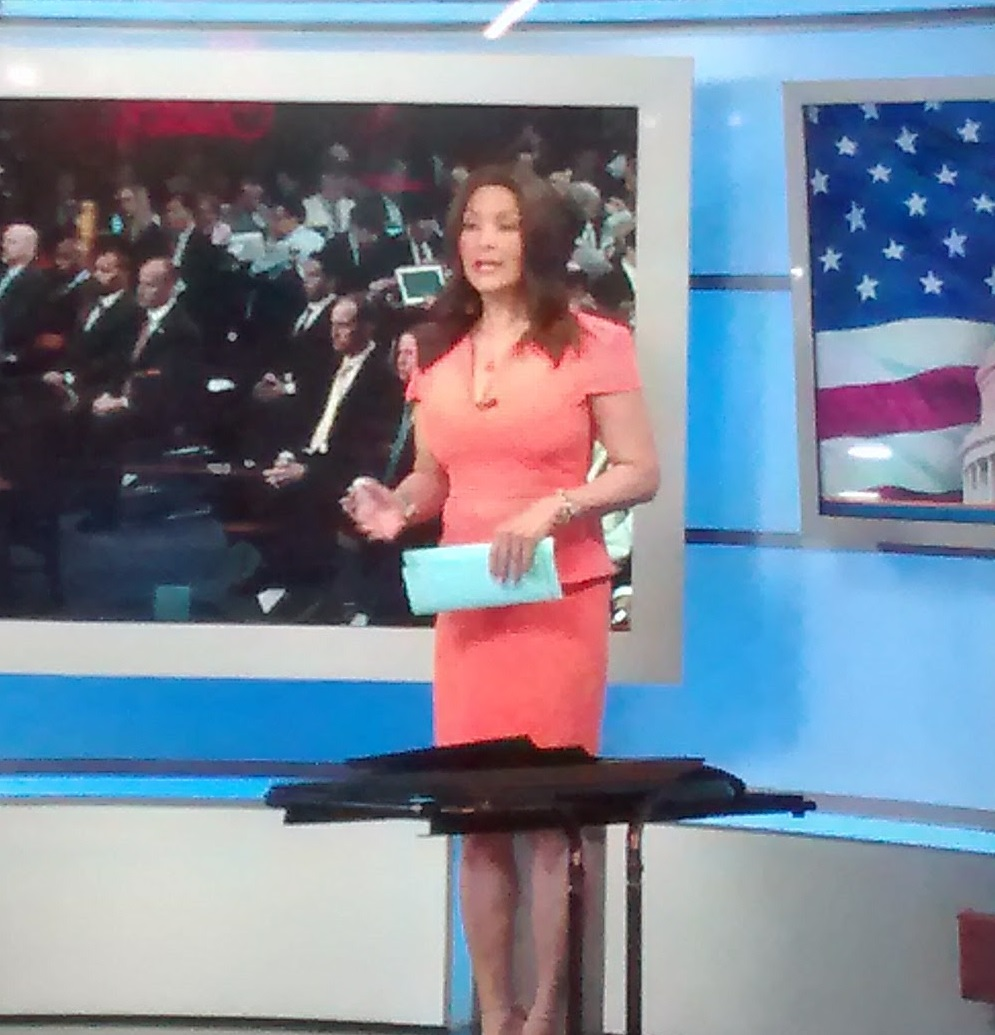
- Burton broadcasting the ABC 7 Eyewitness News' at 10 p.m. on June 8, 2017.
- Born: Cheryl Annette Burton; December 25, 1962 (age 63); Chicago, Illinois, U.S.
- Education: University of Illinois at Urbana–Champaign
- Occupation: News anchor
- Years active: 1986–present
- Notable credit(s): ABC 7 Chicago (WLS-TV) (1992–present)
- Spouse: Jim Rose (m. 1986; div. 1995)

Cheryl Annette Burton (born December 25, 1962) is an American news anchor who has been working for WLS–TV, an American Broadcasting Company-owned and operated television station in Chicago, Illinois, since 1992. Burton anchors the station's 5 p.m. and 10 p.m. newscast alongside Ravi Baichwal and Rob Elgas. She formerly anchored for the 7pm newscast on WCIU-TV alongside Hosea Sanders. She also currently anchors the digital 6:30 p.m. newscast alongside Rob Elgas.

== Biography ==
=== Early life and education ===
Burton was born at Provident Hospital in Chicago, the fourth of five children to Hattie, a Chicago Public Schools teacher and Simpson Burton, a U.S. Air Force veteran. For high school, Burton attended and graduated from Lindblom Technical High School (now known as Lindblom Math & Science Academy) in 1980. Burton graduated from the University of Illinois Urbana-Champaign where she received her B.S. in Psychology and Biology. She is a member of Delta Sigma Theta Sorority. In 2007, she was the first alumna inducted into the school's hall of fame.

=== Professional career ===
Prior to Burton beginning her career in broadcasting, she was on television on Romper Room, as a contestant on Star Search, and hosted an hour long cable TV show called Simply Elegant. Burton's broadcasting career began in 1989 at WGN-TV in Chicago where she co-anchored "MBR: The Minority Business Report", a nationally syndicated weekly series. In 1990, she moved to Peoria, Illinois, where she worked as a reporter at WMBD-TV. From 1990 to 1992, she was an anchor at KWCH-DT in Wichita, Kansas. Burton joined WLS-TV in 1992 as a weekend co-anchor/reporter. In 2003, she was promoted to 5 p.m. weekday co-anchor and 10 p.m. contributing anchor with Ron Magers and Kathy Brock.

In addition to being on television, Burton was a cheerleader. She was part of the Chicago Honey Bears cheerleading squad for the Chicago Bears for three seasons from 1983–1986.

On June 12, 2018, WLS-TV announced that Burton would replace retiring anchor Kathy Brock as the 10pm anchor alongside Alan Krashesky. Burton anchored the 5pm show and 7pm show on WCIU-TV until it was discontinued in 2019. In 2021, sports anchor Mark Giangreco called Burton someone who could portray a "ditzy, combative interior decorator" on DIY Network; Burton filed a complaint to management, which led to his termination.

=== Accomplishments/Volunteer Work ===
Burton was the first recipient of the 2005 "Sisters in the Spirit" Award, a religious award. She was also the recipient of the 2009 Procter & Gamble Award for her outstanding community service. In 2008, Burton won the NABJ (National Association of Black Journalist) Salute to Excellence International. In the year of 2004 and 2005, she was honored with the Thurgood Marshall Award. Also in 2004, the Chicago Association of Black Journalist (CABJ) honored Burton with the Russ Ewing Award for her coverage of the E2 nightclub tragedy. In 1998, she was honored for her profession with the Kizzy Image and Achievement Award. Burton received the Phenomenal Woman Award in 1997, and she was also awarded CABJ for coverage of the Million Man March. Burton volunteer for the Boys & Girls Clubs of America. She is also a public speaker for the students of the Chicago Public Schools. She is a participant in the Rush-Presbyterian/St. Luke's fashion show. Burton is also a board member of the Life with Lupus Guild.

== Personal ==
Burton has been married once and has no children. From 1986 until 1995, Burton was married to ABC 7 sports reporter Jim Rose. Rose, who had been dating Burton when she was a Chicago Bears cheerleader, proposed on the Friday night before Super Bowl XX in New Orleans.

On April 23, 2008, Burton, along with 4 others (5 separate attacks), was injured after a man punched them in the head or face. 28-year-old Gregory Perdue went on a fist-throwing rampage down a sidewalk in downtown Chicago. Burton was hit while on her dinner break. She was walking near Washington St. and State Street when she was hit in the head by what she thought was a bullet. She was however, hit by a punch in the head from Perdue which knocked her to the ground. An X-ray and CAT Scan revealed no severe damage, but she said she suffered from headaches for months following the attack. At the trial, Perdue's attorney said Perdue was schizophrenic. Perdue was found not guilty on five counts of aggravated battery. The judge instead remanded Perdue to the state Department of Mental Health until April 2015.
