= Tim Weigel =

American broadcaster (1945–2001)

- Born: John Timothy Weigel; March 4, 1945
- Died: June 17, 2001 (aged 56)
- Occupation: Broadcaster
- Spouses: Kathy Worthington (m. 1966; div. 1975); Carol Phifer (divorced); Vicki Truax (m. 1992)
- Children: 3, including Rafer and Jenniffer Weigel

John Timothy Weigel (March 4, 1945 – June 17, 2001), known professionally as Tim Weigel, was a Chicago broadcaster who spent most of his career as a television sports anchor and reporter.

== Early life and education ==
Weigel grew up in Gurnee, Illinois, north of Chicago. His father was John Weigel, a broadcast announcer who did voiceovers for national commercials and who founded WCIU-TV and Weigel Broadcasting. His mother, Virginia Ahn, had been a big-band singer with Tommy Dorsey.

Weigel later moved with his family to Lake Forest, Illinois, where he graduated from Lake Forest High School. He finished third in his class and then attended Yale University, where he played football and was in the same Residential College as future movie critic Gene Siskel. He graduated from Yale with a bachelor's degree in history, and after two years of working, returned home to the Chicago area to earn a master's degree in film from Northwestern University in 1970.

== Professional career ==
Weigel spent the first two years out of Yale working as an inner-city schoolteacher in New Haven, Connecticut. After completing his graduate degree at Northwestern, Weigel returned to New Haven to work as a waiter. While waiting tables, however, he ran into Yale's president, Kingman Brewster, Jr., who knew Weigel and then helped him to get a job as a reporter at the New Haven Register.

In 1971, Weigel returned to Chicago as a college football writer for the Chicago Daily News. In 1975, Weigel began filing reports for WMAQ-AM and several months later became a sports anchor for WMAQ-TV. In 1977, Weigel joined WLS-TV in Chicago. During his long tenure at the ABC affiliate, Weigel became known for his packaged bloopers which he dubbed "Weigel Wieners" and also for his colorful attire. For a brief time at WLS-TV (1981-1983), Weigel was a news anchor, but he largely was the station's lead sports anchor during his tenure at the station, which lasted from 1977 until December 1994, when he was fired to make way for Mark Giangreco.

In February 1995, Weigel joined WBBM-TV as its lead sports anchor/sports director. He also began writing a sports column for the Chicago Sun-Times.

== Illness and death ==
In June 2000, Weigel began experiencing vision problems. An MRI revealed a brain tumor, leading to immediate surgery. After his operation and subsequent radiation treatments, Weigel returned to work. However, six months later, another MRI showed the tumor had recurred.

Weigel died exactly one year to the day after his operation, at his home in Evanston, Illinois. Because Weigel had been good friends with Gene Siskel, many reports on his death noted the sad fact that they each died of untreatable brain cancer, just a few years apart, and in each case having gone from having no health issues to being killed by cancer.

== Personal ==
Weigel married his high school sweetheart, Kathy Worthington, in 1966. They had two children, Rafer Weigel, also a former WLS-TV sports anchor, and Jenniffer Weigel, who became a Chicago television reporter. Weigel and Worthington divorced in 1975. He later married Carol Phifer, and that marriage also ended in divorce.

In 1992, Weigel married morning radio personality Vicki Truax. They had one daughter, Teddi, in 1994.

Tim enjoyed a side career of playing semi-pro Football for the Chicago Lions in the late '70s into the early '80s. He was a running back who was known as White Shoes Weigel. In 1999, he was inducted into the American Football Association's Semi-Pro Football Hall of Fame.
