= Chicago Honey Bears =

Cheerleading squad in the NFL

- Established: 1976; 50 years ago
- Defunct: January 26, 1986; 40 years ago
- Director: Cathy Core
- Affiliations: Chicago Bears
- Website: www.chicagohoneybears.net

The Chicago Honey Bears were a cheerleading squad for the Chicago Bears of the National Football League during the late 1970s and early 1980s. The group performed at Bears games at Soldier Field. After Super Bowl XX, the squad was disbanded, and currently, the Bears are one of the seven NFL teams that do not have cheerleaders, along with the Buffalo Bills, Cleveland Browns, Los Angeles Chargers, New York Giants, New York Jets, and Pittsburgh Steelers.

== History ==
In 1976, after a disastrous 1975 season for the Bears, owner/founder George Halas decided to bring "dancing girls" to the Bears, after the success of other cheerleading corps like the Dallas Cowboys Cheerleaders, Washington Redskins Cheerleaders and other squads prompted Halas to get the Bears a squad as well, and requested general manager Jim Finks to find a director. During the search, Finks was given a recommendation for former cheerleader and choreographer Cathy Core, who had recently moved to Chicago from New Jersey. However, when Finks asked Core about choreographing the squad, Core thought it was a prank and hung up. After some verification, Core accepted. During the meeting with Core, Halas stated that "As long as I'm alive, we will have dancing girls on the sidelines." Halas was true to his word, as the Honey Bears were around for the rest of his life until his death in 1983. After 28 girls were selected, they became an instant hit. However, the job did not pay much, as they were only paid $15 a game ($5 for gas, $5 for parking and $5 for uniform cleaning). By 1985, the wage was extended to $20. Despite this, over 5,000 ladies auditioned in 1985. Unlike current squads, the Honey Bears performed more actual cheerleading stunts than dance moves that other squads perform.

In addition to home games at Soldier Field, the Honey Bears also performed at one away game in Tampa, Florida. The Chicago Honey Bears donated numerous hours of service to charities, as well as made guest appearances on television, including the Richard Simmons Show and the WGN Jerry Lewis Muscular Dystrophy Telethon, and performed and signed autographs at various other events, including at the Great Lakes Naval Station for the Navy servicemen. They did various ads and posters, including a Kodak film ad, a Chicago Buckingham Fountain postcard, a Stroh's beer poster, and a poster of The Chicago Honey Bears official head shots featuring hair and make up by Vidal Sassoon, who was the official hair stylist of the NFL Chicago Honey Bears. Vidal Sassoon selected Chicago Honey Bear line captain and assistant choreographer Sharon Shackelford to be a hair model and he cut, colored and styled her hair live on the Phil Donahue Show.

Aside from the Chicago Honey Bears being dancers and cheerleaders, at the Honey Bear auditions, Cathy Core and a panel of judges, including talent agents, narrowed their search by making the contestants display an additional talent, such as singing, playing instruments, acrobatic abilities or other dance forms and talents, before making their final selections of who would be on the squad each season. They also did modeling, including an incident when a member of the squad appeared topless in a Playboy magazine. After this incident, the cheerleaders signed contracts that forbade posing nude and also forbade fraternizing with the Chicago Bears football players except at approved events.

Even though the Honey Bears were a hit, after Halas' death in 1983, his daughter Virginia Halas McCaskey attempted to sever all ties with the group. She believed that they were sexist and degrading to women (she called them "sex objects"), as well as them costing up to $50,000 a season. However, McCaskey had to legally honor the group's contract with the team until it expired at the end of the 1985 season. The Chicago Honey Bears had their final performance in Super Bowl XX in the Superdome in New Orleans, performing at halftime to Prince's song "Baby I'm a Star".

Core was quoted saying:

"At the time, they told me it was basically a change in philosophy. The Bears wanted to be about blood-and-guts football and football only. I think there are certain people in the (McCaskey) family who have dominated the negative part of the issue, and as long as those people are still around and still vocal, I don't think the Honey Bears will come back."

The Bears organization indicated that they believed a cheerleading squad was not an acceptable part of the game day experience.

== Curse of the Honey Bears ==
Some Bears fans claim that their team lingers under a "Honey Bear Curse", as the team still has yet to win a Super Bowl after the group's termination. The Bears came close in Super Bowl XLI, but lost to the Indianapolis Colts. The Bears unveiled a mascot, Staley Da Bear, in 2003.

As of 2021, the Bears have gone 5–11 (.313) in the postseason, compared to the team's 4–3 record during the squad's tenure (.521), as well as 235-254 (.480) in the regular season after the squad's termination, a .30 winning percentage differential than during the squad's existence (82–67). The team had also gone 35–76–1 (.317) in the eight years before the squad's existence.

== Attempted revivals ==
Despite numerous attempts to bring back the Honey Bears and fan polls supporting the squad 3–1, Virginia McCaskey let it be known the Bears would not have cheerleaders as long as she owned the team. Her sons, Michael and George McCaskey also opposed having cheerleaders. Virginia died in 2025 and Michael died in 2020, leaving George as the current owner. George has reportedly said he will not allow cheerleaders as long as he owns the team. A small group of Bears fans created an unofficial Honey Bears who appeared at the team's training camp in 2010 as part of the unofficial web page to bring back the squad, which also has petitions that fans can sign to bring back the group.

Another homage to the Honey Bears is with "Honey Bear", a superfan for the Bears done by Lena Duda, who has been active in the Bears stands and tailgate scene since 2007. Honey Bear's "uniform" consists of white hot pants, white go-go boots, pom poms, and white vest; all being recreations of the squad's trademark uniforms.

A year after the squad's disbanding, a producer named Greg Schwartz trademarked the name, purchased a federal registration, and eventually turned the once-cheerleading squad into a song and dance group. The group has performed for various Fortune 500 companies and has done modeling.

== Uniforms ==
The squad's uniforms, like the Bears, experienced very little changes. From the squad's inception in 1976 to 1980, the uniform was a white bodysuit with navy blue sleeves. From 1980 to 1984, the squad once again wore a white bodysuit, but with orange sleeves instead, with the navy blue being moved to the trim. In the group's final year, the uniform was completely revamped, with an orange sequin vest. In cold weather games, the Honey Bears wore an orange tracksuit. Former Indianapolis Colts and Indiana Firebirds cheerleader Carey modeled for prototype Honey Bears uniforms for the unofficial squad website, taking her ideas from current NFL cheerleading squads.

== Notable member ==
- Cheryl Burton – WLS-TV news anchor
