= Chiaverini =

Chiaverini is an Italian surname. Notable people with the surname include:

- Darrin Chiaverini (born 1977), American football player and coach
- Jennifer Chiaverini (born 1969), American quilter and writer
- Ryan Chiaverini, American radio personality
