= Judie Garcia =

American journalist

Judie Garcia (born July 21, 1960) is a former Chicago news anchor and reporter for WGN-TV.

== Early life and education ==
Born in Chicago to Mexican-American parents, Garcia earned a bachelor's degree in English from the University of Texas in 1990.

== Professional career ==
She worked for many years as a paralegal before beginning her broadcasting career at the age of 34. Her first television job was at KMOL-TV (now WOAI-TV) in San Antonio, followed by work as a reporter at KWES-TV in Odessa, Texas/Midland, Texas. Garcia then accepted an on-air job as the 11 p.m. anchor at KNTV-TV in San Jose, California.

According to a Chicago Sun-Times article dated September 25, 1996, she joined WLS-TV in Chicago as a news reporter and fill-in news anchor. Several months later, Garcia was promoted to co-anchor of WLS' two Sunday morning newscasts, first alongside WLS' John Garcia (no relation) and later next to Beth Spicuzza and then Dick Johnson.

Garcia left WLS-TV in June 2001 to pursue opportunities in broadcasting and elsewhere, according to a June 8, 2001 article in the Chicago Sun-Times.

In April 2002, she joined WBBM-TV in Chicago as a per diem free-lance news reporter, according to an April 2, 2002 article in the Chicago Sun-Times.

In 2003, Garcia joined WGN-TV as a reporter.
