= Batten Institute =

Coordinates: 38.052096°N 78.513901°W

The Batten Institute for entrepreneurship and innovation is one of the Centers of Excellence at the University of Virginia's Darden Graduate School of Business Administration. It was founded in 1999 with a $60 million gift to the Darden School from alumnus Frank Batten, chairman of Landmark Communications, founder of The Weather Channel.

== Function ==
The Institute publishes a series of white papers on entrepreneurship and innovation topics.

The Executive Director of the Institute is Omar Garriott, a longtime tech executive and entrepreneur.

== Programs and events ==
The Batten Institute operates the i.Lab at the University of Virginia, located at the Darden School of Business. Through this lab, the institute hosts a business incubator program for University of Virginia students and members of the local community. Additional entrepreneurship programs and events are hosted at the i.Lab through the year.

In partnership with other schools at the University of Virginia, the Batten Institute sponsors a series of three annual competitions which educate students across the University on entrepreneurial methods.

The Batten Institute Fellows Program brings visitors to the Darden School of Business for short and long-term visits.
