= Mary Ann Childers =

American news person (active 1974– )

Mary Ann Childers is an American media consultant and former newscaster. From 1980 to 1994, she worked as an anchor at WLS-TV in Chicago, where she became the first woman to anchor a top-rated 10:00 pm newscast in Chicago. She then worked as a reporter and anchor at Chicago's WBBM-TV from 1994 to 2008.

Childers grew up in Louisville, Kentucky. During her senior year at Northwestern University in 1974, she entered broadcasting as an intern at WGN-TV in Chicago. At the time, she was a pre-law student, but she applied for the broadcasting internship to earn the last credit she needed to graduate. After her internship ended, she became an associate producer for The Phil Donahue Show, which was being filmed at the WGN studios. She left the show for news-anchor jobs at WAVE in Louisville and WTHR in Indianapolis, then moved back to the Chicago market in 1980, joining WLS-TV as a weekend anchor.

By 1986, Childers and John Drury were anchoring Chicago's top-rated 10:00 pm news broadcast. In 1987, Robert Feder wrote, "With the obvious exception of Oprah Winfrey, the most popular television stars in Chicago today are WLS-Channel 7 anchors John Drury and Mary Ann Childers." In 1994, Childers decided not to renew her contract with WLS and joined WBBM-TV.

On March 31, 2008, she was announced as leaving WBBM along with 17 others, as part of cost cutting throughout the CBS news division. Her contract was not renewed along with on-air personalities Diann Burns and Sports Director Mark Malone. She then joined the Res Publica Group, a strategic communications firm.

Childers is married to Jay Levine, a fellow journalist, who worked with her at WLS and WBBM. They were married in 1989. For a time, the two served as co-anchors on WBBM.
