= Mark Schanowski =

American sportscaster

Mark Schanowski is an American sportscaster. Schanowski currently works for WLS-TV ABC7 Chicago and was formerly on NBC Sports Chicago, appearing in the Chicago Bulls' pre- and post-game shows as well as the SportsNite program. He is also the per diem sports anchor and reporter for WLS-TV. Schanowski had worked as a sports anchor at WMAQ-TV until 2005. On May 20, 2021, it was announced Schanowski will join WLS-TV starting May 29, 2021 as a per diem sports anchor and reporter for the station. On May 29, 2021, Schanowski made his debut appearance on WLS-TV during the 5pm news. He is co-host of the "Gimme the Hot Sauce" podcast with Stacey King and Tim Kelley.
