= Lew Wood =

American television journalist

Lew Wood (1929 – August 21, 2013) was an American television journalist and public relations professional who reported for CBS News and NBC News. Wood served as the news anchor on NBC's Today Show from 1975 to 1976.

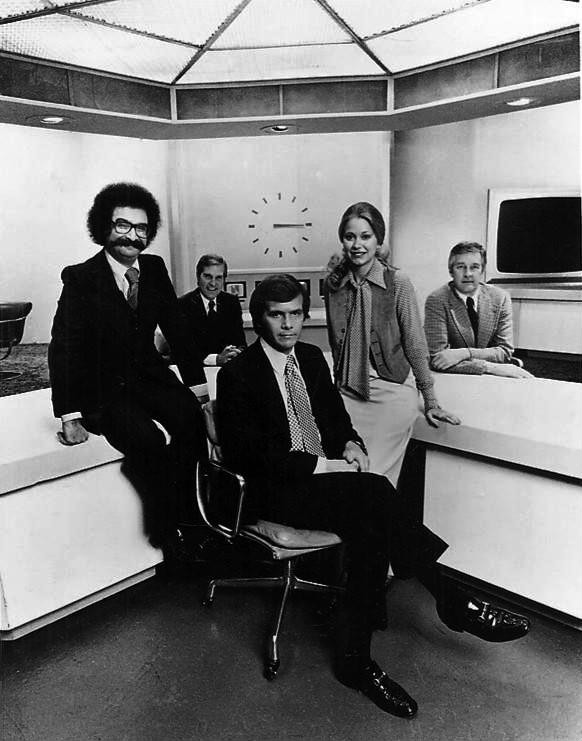
From The Today Show. Center: Tom Brokaw. From left: Gene Shalit, (background) Lew Wood, Jane Pauley, Floyd Kalber.

== Early life ==
Wood was born in Indianapolis, Indiana, and attended Howe High School. He received a bachelor's degree in speech and broadcasting from Purdue University.

== Career ==
In 1952, Wood began his broadcasting career at WDZ, a commercial radio station in Decatur, Illinois, soon after graduating from Purdue. He then joined WSBT, radio and TV broadcaster, in South Bend, Indiana, in 1953.

Wood joined the staff of CBS News as a national correspondent. He covered the Civil Rights Movement for CBS News, including one of the marches with Martin Luther King Jr. He was one of the CBS reporters who covered President John F. Kennedy's visit to Dallas, Texas, on November 22, 1963, on the day of Kennedy's assassination. Wood had covered Kennedy's morning speech in Fort Worth, Texas. Outside of reporting, Wood had taken a personal photograph of President Kennedy greeting supporters shortly before Kennedy left for the Dallas motorcade. Wood later learned that President Kennedy had been shot while speaking with CBS colleague Dan Rather during a brief phone conversation. Rather had interrupted the conversation saying, "Hold On Lew — don’t go away" before telling Wood that Kennedy had been shot. Rather told Wood to go the Dallas hospital where Kennedy had been taken, which he did.

Lew Wood also worked as a news anchor for WNBC, the New York City flagship station of NBC.

In 1975, NBC hired Wood as the news anchor for its morning Today Show, succeeding longtime anchor, Frank Blair. Wood became only the third news anchor in the show's history. He anchored the news portion of the show opposite Today's other three on-air personalities: Barbara Walters, Jim Hartz and Gene Shalit. Wood remained at Today for just one year. He left the show in 1976 after the Today Show's producers decided to shake up the show and take it in a new direction. For his part, Wood had joked that "he left the Today show, it was due to illness and fatigue. They were sick and tired of him." He was succeeded by Chicago newsman Floyd Kalber.

Wood moved from television to public relations after leaving the Today Show. He trained business executives from Fortune 500 corporations in public relations techniques to deal with the media. He also served as the American Legion's National Director of Public Relations. Wood retired in 2006.

== Death ==
Lew Wood died at a hospice in Riverside County, California, on August 21, 2013, at the age of 84.
