= Sandi Freeman =

American journalist and cable television pioneer

Sandi Freeman-Geller (1943-2022) was an American journalist and cable television pioneer. She hosted Freeman Reports on CNN for five years. Previously, she won an Emmy for her work at WLS-TV. At the height of her career at CNN, she was often referred to in the press as the "best interviewer" on television at a time when there were few female hosts.

== Early life ==
Raised in St. Louis, Freeman attended Webster College. She worked for the WLS-TV, the ABC owned-and-operated television station from 1973 to 1980. Freeman co-hosted AM Chicago for WLS-TV alongside (at various points) Steve Edwards, John Barbour and Robb Weller.

== Career ==
Ted Turner hired her for a daily evening program that reached large audiences as one of the pioneers of the then nascent CNN. Her program, The Freeman Report, aired on CNN from 1980 to 1985. During that time, she interviewed many famous personalities, including Frank Zappa, Shimon Peres, Hosni Mubarak, Yitzhak Shamir and others.

In 1985, the show was replaced by Larry King Live.

== Awards ==
Freeman won the On Cable magazine Outstanding Talk Show Personality Award three times from 1982 to 1984.

== Personal life ==
Freeman married Alfred Geller (1932–2011) in 1983 and later retired from journalism.

She died on July 5, 2022 in Aventura, Florida. She had 3 sons from an earlier marriage.
