= Jenny (TV series) =

American NBC sitcom 1997-1998

- Genre: Sitcom
- Created by: Howard Gewirtz; Mark Reisman
- Directed by: Andy Ackerman; Leonard R. Garner Jr. Jeffrey Melman
- Starring: Jenny McCarthy; Heather Paige Kent; Dale Godboldo; Rafer Weigel; George Hamilton
- Theme music composer: Brian Tyler
- Composer: Bruce Miller
- Country of origin: United States
- Original language: English
- No. of seasons: 1
- No. of episodes: 17 (7 unaired)

Production
- Executive producers: Howard Gewirtz; Mark Reisman
- Producers: Stevie Ray Fromstein; Lori A. Moneymaker; Jenny McCarthy
- Editor: Timothy Mozer
- Running time: 30 minutes
- Production companies: Mark & Howard Productions; MTV Productions; Paramount Television

Original release
- Network: NBC
- Release: September 28, 1997 – January 12, 1998

Jenny is an American sitcom produced by Mark & Howard Productions, MTV Productions and Paramount Television that aired on NBC from September 28, 1997, to January 12, 1998. The series was intended to be a star vehicle for Jenny McCarthy.

== Synopsis ==
The series starred McCarthy as Jenny McMillan, a convenience store clerk in upstate New York who suddenly inherits a vast fortune from the B movie star father (George Hamilton) she never knew (who appears on TV in movies and commercials). After her father's funeral, Jenny and her lifelong friend Maggie (Heather Paige Kent) decide to pursue fame in Hollywood.

== Cast ==
- Jenny McCarthy as Jenny McMillan
- Heather Paige Kent as Maggie Marino
- Dale Godboldo as Cooper
- Rafer Weigel as Max
- George Hamilton as Guy Hathaway
- Carolyn Hennesy as Chase Gardner

== Cancellation ==
The series, originally scheduled on Sundays opposite the second half of CBS's Top 5 hit Touched by an Angel, Fox's Top 15 hit King of the Hill, and the last half-hour of ABC's Top 40 hit The Wonderful World of Disney, was moved to Monday nights in December 1997 in an attempt to gain more viewers. The move failed to attract more viewers and Jenny was canceled after 10 of the 17 episodes produced were aired. After the first 10 shows aired Paramount Television continued production in anticipation of the series being picked up by UPN, but the show was not picked up by the network. In an episode seen only outside the United States, Guy turned out not to be dead only missing.

== Episodes ==
No.	Title	Directed by	Written by	Original release date	Viewers (millions)
1	"Pilot"	Andy Ackerman	Mark Reisman & Howard Gewirtz	September 28, 1997	12.09
2	"A Girl's Gotta Pierce"	Jeff Melman	Joshua Sternin & Jeffrey Ventimilia	October 5, 1997	10.13
3	"A Girl's Gotta Work"	Andy Ackerman	Ellen Byron & Lissa Kapstrom	October 12, 1997	9.63
4	"A Girl's Gotta Spike"	Leonard R. Garner Jr.	Lori Kirkland	November 2, 1997	6.99
5	"A Girl's Gotta Live in the Real World"	Jeff Melman	Jennifer Glickman	November 16, 1997	6.86
6	"A Girl's Gotta Lie"	Leonard R. Garner Jr.	Ellen Byron & Lissa Kapstrom	December 1, 1997	10.96
7	"A Girl's Gotta Deck the Halls"	Jeff Melman	Lori Kirkland & Jennifer Glickman	December 15, 1997	9.52
8	"A Girl's Gotta Love a Wedding"	Leonard R. Garner Jr.	Story by : Howard Gewirtz; Teleplay by : Joshua Sternin & Jeffrey Ventimilia	December 22, 1997	8.45
9	"A Girl's Gotta Merger"	Jeff Melman	Joshua Sternin & Jeffrey Ventimilia	January 5, 1998	9.49
10	"A Girl's Gotta Get It"	Ted Wass	Lori Kirkland	January 12, 1998	8.79
11	"A Girl's Gotta Hang with a Celebrity"	Leonard R. Garner Jr.	Stevie Ray Fromstein	Unaired	N/A
12	"A Girl's Gotta Protect Her Assets"	Jeff Melman	Stevie Ray Fromstein & Martin Weiss	Unaired	N/A
13	"A Girl's Gotta Make Room for Daddy: Part 1"	Jeff Melman	Ellen Byron & Lissa Kapstrom	Unaired	N/A
14	"A Girl's Gotta Make Room for Daddy: Part 2"	Jeff Melman	Joshua Sternin & Jeffrey Ventimilia	Unaired	N/A
15	"A Girl's Gotta Go Vogue"	Matthew Diamond	Lori Kirkland	Unaired	N/A
16	"A Girl's Gotta Get Ready for Her Close-up"	Leonard R. Garner Jr.	Jennifer Glickman	Unaired	N/A
17	"A Girl's Gotta Come Through in a Clutch"	Jeff Melman	Jon Ross	Unaired	N/A
