= Linda Yu =

Chinese-American former news anchor and author

- Born: December 1, 1946 (age 79); Xi'an, China
- Education: University Of Southern California (B.A.)
- Occupations: News anchor; author
- Years active: 1970–2016
- Known for: NBC 5 Chicago (1979–1984); ABC 7 Chicago (1984–2016)
- Spouse: Richard Baer (m. 1982; div. 1996)
- Children: 2

Linda Yu (born December 1, 1946) is a Chinese-American former news anchor and author. Yu is best known as co-anchor on the Eyewitness newscast for WLS-TV in Chicago from April 1984 until November 2016. Yu became Chicago's first Asian-American broadcast journalist when she began her news career in Chicago at WMAQ-TV in 1979. For her broadcasting work, Yu has received five local Emmy Awards including one for her report examining the aftermath of 9/11 in 2001. In 1984, Yu was honored with a National Gold Medal from the National Conference of Community and Justice for her documentary, "The Scars of Belfast".

== Biography ==
=== Early life and education ===
Originally from Xian, China, Yu moved to Hong Kong with her family at the age of three, later migrating to the United States in 1951. Upon arriving in the States, Yu spoke only Mandarin; knowing just two words of English ("hello" and "thank you"). Yu and her family lived in Pennsylvania for four years and Indiana for two, finally settling in California when Yu was 12 years old. Yu graduated from the University of Southern California with a Bachelor of Arts degree in journalism in 1968.

=== Career ===
Yu's began her career in broadcasting in 1970 where she became a writer and producer for KTLA-TV in Los Angeles and then as a writer for ABC O&O KABC-TV also in Los Angeles. In early 1975, Yu moved to Portland, Oregon where she had a brief stint as a reporter for KATU-TV. After a few months in Oregon, Yu moved back to California where she landed a job as general assignment reporter and back-up anchor for ABC O&O KGO-TV in San Francisco, where she worked until 1979. In August 1977, A news report Yu did helped with the introduction of state legislation to protect residents from uninsured motorists.

Yu moved to Chicago in early 1979 and started working at NBC's WMAQ-TV in June of that year. Yu began her career at the station as a general assignment reporter and weekend co-anchor. By February 1980, Yu began working as co-anchor on the 4:30 and 10PM newscasts alongside Ron Magers. In May 1981, Yu received an Emmy award for a special newscast on the March 30, 1981 assassination attempt on President Ronald Reagan. Yu received a second Emmy award the following year for her report and coverage of a construction accident in Chicago's downtown Loop. Beginning in November 1983, Yu became disturbed with WMAQ-TV's management, ending her five-year career with the station in March 1984. In April 1984, Yu joined the WLS-TV (ABC 7 Chicago) station as co-anchor of the station's 4PM newscast mostly alongside news anchor Joel Daly until his retirement in 2005.

Yu also served as co-anchor for the 30-minute 11:30AM newscast alongside Sylvia Perez, beginning in 1992 until the now hour-long 11AM newscast was canceled in 2013. In 1987, Yu received the Emmy for Outstanding Achievement within a Regularly Scheduled News Program, Spot Coverage. Yu and Perez were the first women in the Chicago market to co-anchor a newscast.

=== Retirement ===
On September 6, 2016, Yu announced her retirement from WLS-TV and TV news after 46 years in news and 37 years in the Chicago market. Yu's last news broadcast was November 23 at 4PM. Earlier in the day, Windy City Live (an ABC 7 program) aired a tribute show to Yu where her friends, family, co-workers and former co-workers reviewed and celebrated her career as well as her personal contributions to the city.

== Personal ==
Yu married Dr. Richard Baer, a psychiatrist, on June 12, 1982 at St. James Cathedral in Chicago. Shortly after their wedding, Yu and Baer were involved in an auto accident while on their honeymoon in southern France; which resulted in Baer being hospitalized due to a mild concussion. Yu has two children, a son Ricky (b. July 1985) and a daughter, Francesca (b. February 1989). Yu and Baer divorced in 1996. In January 2014, Yu broke her leg in a motor vehicle accident.
