= Diane Pathieu =

American television anchor

- Born: Diane Pathieu; September 18th 1978; Chicago, Illinois
- Education: Columbia College Chicago
- Occupations: Journalist; Newscaster
- Years active: 2000–present
- Television: KFXB-TV; KCRG-TV; WTMJ-TV; WLS-TV

Diane Pathieu is an American television anchor who works for WLS-TV in Chicago.

== Biography ==
Pathieu was born and raised to an Assyrian family in the Rogers Park neighborhood of Chicago. Her mother is an immigrant from Syria and her father is an immigrant from Lebanon. In 2001, she graduated with a B.A. from Columbia College. While in school, she worked at Metro/Shadow Traffic and WMAQ-TV. After graduation, she moved to Iowa to work as an anchor and producer at KFXB-TV in Dubuque, Iowa. She then accepted a position as a general assignment reporter and weekend anchor at KCRG-TV in Cedar Rapids, Iowa. In 2005, she accepted a position at WTMJ-TV in Milwaukee as a reporter on the morning newscast and as anchor for the noon newscast. In December 2011, she moved to WLS-TV where she serves as general assignment reporter and fill-in anchor.

Pathieu is widowed, formerly married to Nick Adamski, who died from brain cancer in May 2025. She speaks Assyrian.
