= Alan Krashesky =

American journalist

Alan Krashesky (born October 19, 1960) is a former American news anchor. He was the principal news anchor for WLS-TV, an American Broadcasting Company-owned and operated television station in Chicago, Illinois.

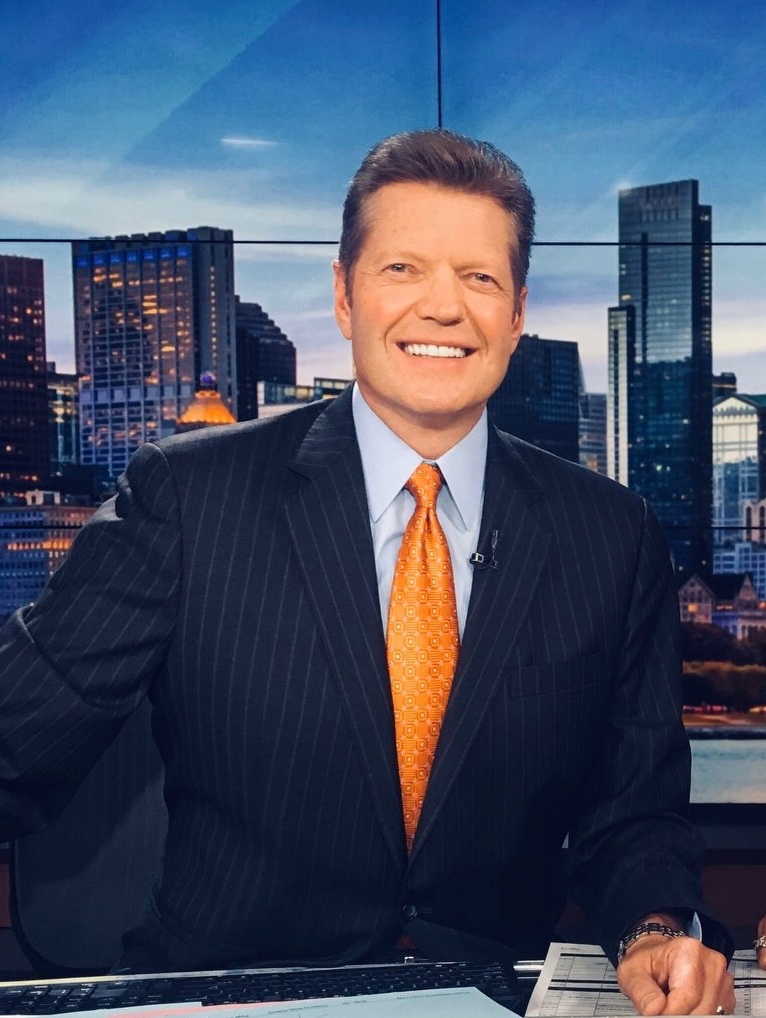
Alan Krashesky in 2018

== Career ==
Krashesky was with ABC 7 starting in 1982 when he was hired as a general assignment reporter. He anchored the 5pm, 6pm and 10pm weekday newscasts. He co-anchored the 10pm newscast since May 2016, initially with Kathy Brock until her retirement on June 27, 2018, and then with Cheryl Burton. He co-anchored the 6 pm weekday newscast since 1998, most recently alongside Judy Hsu, and previously with Kathy Brock from 1998 to 2018. He co-anchored the 5pm newscast with Cheryl Burton from May 2016 until his retirement on November 22, 2022. Previously, he co-anchored the 4pm weekday newscast alongside Linda Yu from May 2005 to May 2016. Prior to that, he co-anchored the station's 5 p.m. weekday newscast with Diann Burns from 1994 to 1998. Krashesky was also the first person to anchor ABC 7's morning newscasts; a position he held from 1989 - 1994. Every newscast he has anchored has consistently been rated #1 in the Chicago market.

After graduating from college in 1981, Krashesky became a news reporter for WBNG-TV in Binghamton, New York. After just a year at WBNG-TV, he moved to Austin, Texas where he was a news reporter and weekend weather anchor at KTBC-TV. He gained his first broadcasting experience when he was a news anchor at WICB radio in Ithaca, New York.

On October 4, 2022, Krashesky announced his retirement. On November 22, 2022, he anchored his final newscasts at 5:00 pm, 6:00 pm, and 10:00 pm.

== Education and personal life ==
Krashesky was born in Philadelphia, Pennsylvania. His father was murdered in a robbery when Alan was four months old, and he attended the Milton Hershey School, a residential school for children in social and financial need. In 2005, Krashesky was named Milton Hershey Alumnus of the Year. He attended Ithaca College in Ithaca, New York. In 1981, he graduated with a B.S. in Communications Management.

Krashesky has three older siblings and is married to Colleen Merritt Krashesky; together, they have 3 children. Their son, Kian, was born in South Korea and goes to Columbia College Chicago. Their youngest daughter, Kiera, was born in China and goes to the University of Michigan. The eldest daughter, Kaylin, graduated from the Missouri School of Journalism. From 2009 to 2010, Kaylin was a video journalist and associate producer for WMBF news in Myrtle Beach, South Carolina, and worked as a Morning News Anchor and Reporter for KDRV-TV in Medford, Oregon from 2010 to 2012.
