= Sylvia Perez =

American news anchor (born 1961)

- Born: Sylvia E. Perez; November 17, 1961 (age 64); Lawton, Oklahoma, U.S.
- Education: B.A. University of Oklahoma
- Occupation: News Anchor at WFLD (2016–present)
- Years active: 1983–present
- Notable credit: ABC 7 (1989–2013)
- Spouse: Daniel Blasdell (m. 1992)

Sylvia E. Perez (born November 17, 1961) is an American news anchor. Based in Chicago, Perez currently anchors the weekday editions (Monday to Thursday) of FOX 32 News at Noon, FOX 32 News First at Four and Good Day Chicago Sunday on WFLD-TV (FOX 32) since October 2016.

== Early career ==
A graduate of the University of Oklahoma School of Journalism, Perez began her career in 1983. Prior to joining ABC7, Sylvia worked in Houston and Amarillo, Texas. She also worked in Oklahoma where she won several awards for her reporting. Perez's interest in medical reporting came when she worked at KPRC-TV in Houston, where she also became the weekend co-anchor of ChannelTwoNews.

== Career in Chicago ==
Perez first joined ABC 7 in June 1989. From 1989 until 2013, Perez co–anchored the 11:00 a.m. newscast on Chicago's WLS-TV (ABC 7) alongside Linda Yu. Perez was also the station's "Healthbeat" reporter covering daily health and medical investigative stories for the 4:00 p.m. and 10:00 p.m. newscasts. The highlight of Perez' career came in 1991 when covering the 50th anniversary of Pearl Harbor. There she followed an Illinois veteran back to Hawaii to visit the USS Arizona where his brother and many other American war heroes died when the harbor was attacked.

On June 20, 2013, Perez was released from WLS-TV after 24 years with the station because they decided to cancel the 11:00 a.m. newscast. WLS-TV decided to move Windy City Live (WCL) to the 11:00 a.m. timeslot after the station acquired Live with Kelly and Michael from WGN-TV to add to the 9:00 a.m. In September 2016, media critic Robert Feder announced on his blog that Perez had been hired to anchor the weekend morning newscasts on WFLD-TV. Perez also reports for the daily 9:00 p.m. edition of Fox 32 News.

After leaving ABC7, Perez formed her own production company, Sylvia Perez Productions, where she offers video training, media coaching and other media services to non-profits around the Chicago area.

== Personal life ==
Perez is the youngest of five children, and an "army brat." She currently resides in the suburbs of Chicago with her husband Daniel Blasdell. In March 2016, Perez put her Hinsdale, Illinois mansion back on the market for $1.95 million dollars, previously listing the property for $2.4 million in 2013. Perez purchased the home in 2006.
