= Frank Batten =

American media executive, co-founder of The Weather Channel (1927–2009)

- Born: Frank Batten; February 11, 1927; Norfolk, Virginia, US
- Died: September 10, 2009 (aged 82); Norfolk, Virginia, US
- Education: University of Virginia (undergraduate); Harvard (MBA)
- Occupations: Chairman and CEO, Landmark Communications
- Spouse: Jane Batten
- Children: 3

Frank Batten (February 11, 1927 – September 10, 2009) was an American billionaire businessman, and co-founder of the first nationwide, 24-hour cable weather channel, The Weather Channel. His media company, Landmark Media Enterprises, once owned nine daily newspapers, more than 50 weekly newspapers, television stations in Las Vegas and Nashville, and a national chain of classified advertising publications.

Batten assumed leadership in 1954 of two newspapers, The Virginian-Pilot and The Ledger-Star in Norfolk, Virginia, parlaying those papers into a media conglomerate by acquiring other newspapers, radio stations, and television stations and establishing a cable outlet as well as the national cable weather channel. Until 2008, the company, Landmark Communications, now Landmark Media Enterprises, was one of the country's largest privately held media companies.

Batten sold TeleCable (a multi-system cable TV company) in 1995 to TCI for $1 billion and the Weather Channel in 2008 to NBC Universal and two private equity firms for nearly $3.5 billion.

Batten was chairman of the Associated Press from 1982 to 1987.

== Early life, family and education ==
Batten was born on February 11, 1927, to Frank Batten, a bank auditor, and Dorothy Martin Batten, the daughter of a wealthy Norfolk family. After the death of his father the following year, Batten and his mother moved in with his aunt and uncle, Fay and Samuel L. Slover. A Jewish native of Tennessee, Slover had taken ownership of a newspaper in Newport News, Virginia, which he sold in 1907 to buy what would become the Norfolk Ledger-Dispatch. Themselves childless, the Slovers raised young Frank as their own son.

Batten attended the Culver Academies, a boarding school in Indiana, graduating in 1945. He later attend the United States Merchant Marine Academy in Kings Point, New York. He received his undergraduate degree from the University of Virginia in Charlottesville, Virginia, where he was a member of Delta Kappa Epsilon fraternity. He earned an MBA from Harvard University in 1952.

== The Virginian-Pilot ==
Batten professionalized the newspaper he inherited in 1954 at age 27, and went on to acquire the Portsmouth Star, which he later merged with the Ledger-Dispatch to form the Ledger-Star. During his early days as publisher of The Virginian-Pilot, Batten championed desegregation, a position not often taken in the state of Virginia during the 1950s; Virginia, like much of the American South, was undergoing deep resistance to the movement. In 1960 The Virginian-Pilot received a Pulitzer Prize for articles written in support of racial desegregation.

== Media acquisitions ==
In 1965, Batten acquired The Greensboro Daily News and The Greensboro Record, adding The Roanoke Times in 1969. Together with The Virginian-Pilot, these papers made up the core of the Landmark Publishing business. Under Landmark Publishing many other papers were started and acquired, including dailies, weeklies, community papers, and military papers across the southern and western parts of the United States.

== Birth of The Weather Channel ==
When John Coleman, former WLS-TV Chicago chief meteorologist and Good Morning America forecaster, suggested creating a 24-hour cable weather station, the idea confirmed what Batten had learned at The Virginian-Pilot, that readers prioritized weather information as a primary reason for purchasing the daily paper.

The Weather Channel debuted on May 2, 1982, after ten months in development. Although initially criticized, The Weather Channel ultimately thrived and expanded to include its sister web site, Weather.com, which receives more than 300 million visits per month.

In 2002, on its twentieth anniversary, Batten co-authored The Weather Channel: The Improbable Rise of a Media Phenomenon, recounting the creation of The Weather Channel.

== Philanthropy ==
Batten became the first rector of Old Dominion University in Norfolk, Virginia, served on the boards of the College of William and Mary and Hollins University, and served as vice chairman of the State Council of Higher Education for Virginia.

His gifts to schools and institutions include $32 million to the Harvard Business School, $60 million to the Darden Graduate School of Business Administration at the University of Virginia, $32 million to Old Dominion University, and various scholarships, such as the Batten Scholarship at the Culver Academies. On April 12, 2007, Batten made a gift of $100 million to the University of Virginia, the largest gift in the university's history, to establish the Frank Batten School of Leadership and Public Policy, and in 2006, made a gift of $2 million to Hollins University.

Frank Batten made a $20 million gift to Virginia Wesleyan University to construct the Jane P. Batten Student Center, honoring his wife. Jane Parke Batten joined the VWU Board of Trustees in 1981, served as chair of the board from 1995 to 1998, and was named trustee emerita in 2015. In 2017, Mrs. Batten made a donation to found the Batten Honors College of Virginia Wesleyan University (including a later $80.2 million endowment) and a 44,000-square-foot (4,100 m^{2}) academic building to support the BHC mission of environmental stewardship. Additionally, Mrs. Batten made a lead gift in 2003 to the VWU Key to the Future Campaign, which has funded a number of significant endowments at the university, among them the Batten Professorship, the Frank and Jane P. Batten Distinguished Scholar Award, which recognizes scholarship achievements among VWU faculty since 2004, and the Jane and Frank Batten Endowed Scholarships, which laid the foundation for the Batten Honors College full tuition scholarships. In 2024, Mrs. Batten made an unspecified gift to charter the Jane P. Batten & David R. Black School for International Studies, a joint venture of Virginia Wesleyan University and Lakeland University at their collaborative campus in Japan. On July 1, 2026, Virginia Wesleyan University officially became Batten University in honor of Frank and Jane Batten.

Frank Batten donated to the Norfolk Academy, for the school's library, as well as to the City of Norfolk for a new downtown library.

In 2009, he also started the $50 million Batten Challenge at the Culver Academies, where he would match every dollar donated to the school during 2009–2010 with a dollar of his own.

== Personal life ==
Batten lived in Virginia Beach, Virginia, with his wife Jane Parke Batten. They had two daughters, Mary Elizabeth and Dorothy, and one son, Frank Batten Jr., who succeeded his father as chairman and CEO of Landmark Communications on January 1, 1998. In 2007, Batten was listed as the 190th richest person in the United States, according to Forbes 400, with a net worth of approximately $2.3 billion. Batten owned one of the Chesapeake Bay's largest racing yachts, the Shadow.
