= John Coleman (meteorologist) =

American television weatherman and co-founder of The Weather Channel (1934-2018)

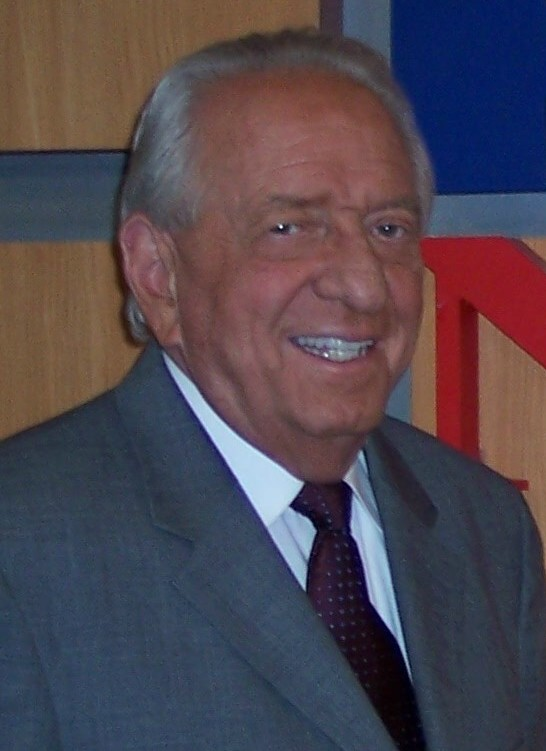
- Coleman in 2007
- Born: John Stewart Coleman; October 15, 1934; Alpine, Texas, U.S.
- Died: January 20, 2018 (aged 83); Las Vegas, Nevada, U.S.
- Education: University of Illinois; Bachelors in Journalism, 1957
- Occupations: Journalist, television meteorologist
- Years active: 1953–2014
- Spouse: Linda Coleman

John Stewart Coleman (October 15, 1934 – January 20, 2018) was an American television meteorologist. Along with Frank Batten, he co-founded The Weather Channel and briefly served as its chief executive officer and president. He retired from broadcasting in 2014 after nearly 61 years, having worked the last 20 years at KUSI-TV in San Diego.

== Professional career ==
Coleman started his career in 1953 at WCIA in Champaign, Illinois, doing the early evening weather forecast and a local bandstand show called At The Hop while he was a student at University of Illinois at Urbana–Champaign. After receiving his journalism degree in 1957, he became the weather anchor for WCIA's sister station WMBD-TV in Peoria, Illinois. Coleman was also a weather anchor for KETV in Omaha, WISN-TV in Milwaukee and then WBBM-TV and WLS-TV in Chicago.

In 1972, Coleman and his stage crew craftsmen at WLS-TV created the first chroma key weather map ever in use.

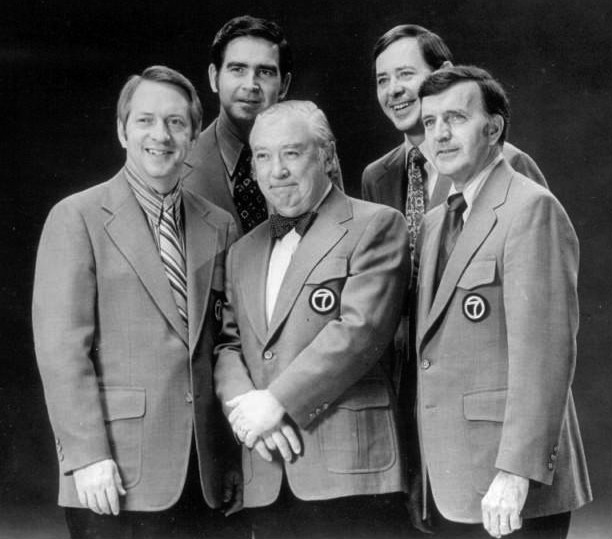
WLS Eyewitness News team, 1972. Back, from left: anchor John Drury, anchor Joel Daly. Front, from left: weatherman John Coleman, anchor Fahey Flynn, sportscaster Bill Frink.

Coleman became the original weatherman on the brand-new ABC network morning program, Good Morning America. He stayed seven years with the program, which was anchored by David Hartman and Joan Lunden.

In 1981, he persuaded communications entrepreneur Frank Batten to help establish The Weather Channel, serving as TWC's CEO and President during the start-up and its first year of operation. After being forced out of TWC a year later, Coleman became weather anchor at WCBS-TV in New York and then at WMAQ-TV in Chicago, before moving to Southern California to join the independent television station, KUSI-TV in San Diego in 1994, in what Coleman fondly calls "his retirement job." Coleman abruptly left KUSI on April 11th, 2014, while he was attending that years' National Tropical Weather Conference in South Padre Island.

Coleman obtained professional membership status in the American Meteorological Society and was named AMS Broadcast Meteorologist of the Year in 1983. Coleman said that after ten years of attending AMS National Meetings and studying the papers published in the organization's journal, the AMS was driven by political, not scientific, agendas and withdrew.

== Views on global warming ==
Coleman spoke out as a "rejectionis[t]" of global warming in 2007 after watching NBC's "Green is Universal" week, when as a sign of environmental awareness, the studio lights were cut for portions of Sunday Night Football's pre-game and half-time shows. In a 2015 open letter to the Intergovernmental Panel on Climate Change, he claimed that a causal relationship between rising levels of atmospheric CO_{2} and rising temperatures had not been shown to exist. He called global warming the "greatest scam in history" and made numerous false or misleading claims about climate science. Coleman held a bachelor's degree in journalism and stated in interviews that he has not conducted any scientific research in the area of climate change. Coleman's views contributed to his decision to drop out of the American Meteorological Society.

== Personal life ==
Coleman was born in 1934 in Alpine, Texas, the youngest of five children born to Hazel Coleman, a mathematics teacher, and Claude Coleman, a college professor. Coleman was married twice. He and his first wife had three children before divorcing. Coleman met his second wife, Linda, at a poker table in Viejas Casino and was married to her for eighteen years. In May 2016, John and Linda Coleman moved to Sun City in the Summerlin Community of Las Vegas. Coleman died on January 20, 2018, at his home in Las Vegas.

== Awards ==
- 1983 – Broadcast Meteorologist of the Year, American Meteorological Society.
