= Jenniffer Weigel =

American radio and television personality (born 1970)

- Born: Jenniffer Colleen Weigel; October 6, 1970 (age 55)
- Education: University of Illinois at Urbana-Champaign
- Occupations: Radio and television personality
- Spouse: Clay Champlin (m. 1998; div. 2011)
- Children: 1
- Parent: Tim Weigel (father)
- Relatives: Rafer Weigel (brother)

Jenniffer Colleen Weigel (born October 6, 1970), known professionally as Jenniffer Weigel, is a Chicago radio and television personality, as well as an author and performer who owns her own Chicago-area production company. She was a morning cohost on WLS-AM alongside Mancow Muller; she now hosts her own show on WLS-AM from 10:00 pm to midnight Monday through Friday. She previously hosted Taste, a program aired on NBC affiliates both in New York and in Chicago, and she also previously wrote a column for the Chicago Tribune and appeared on WGN Television and CLTV in Chicago to discuss her columns as the emcee of Trib University.

== Early life and education ==
Weigel graduated from Evanston Township High School in Evanston, Illinois, and earned a bachelor's degree in theater from the University of Illinois at Urbana-Champaign in 1992.

== Professional career ==
Weigel began her professional career as an actress, appearing in productions at The Second City Northwest, the Wisdom Bridge Theatre and the National Jewish Theater. She also performed voiceover work.

In 1995, Weigel began working as a traffic reporter for WMVP-AM and WLUP-FM in Chicago. In 1997, she shifted to being solely a news anchor for WMVP-AM, working alongside program hosts like Danny Bonaduce and Steve Cochran. From late 1997 until early 1999, she worked as an entertainment reporter for WGN-TV in Chicago.

In 1999, Weigel and her husband, Clay Champlin, began co-hosting a Saturday evening radio show on WCKG-FM in Chicago. From 2002 to 2003, Weigel co-hosted a Saturday afternoon talk show on WLS-AM in Chicago. She continues to occasionally work as a fill-in radio host on WGN-AM in Chicago.

In 1999, Weigel began working as a free-lance entertainment contributor for WBBM-TV in Chicago. In 2000, she won the job on a full-time basis, and in 2001, she won a Chicago Emmy award for her feature reporting. In 2002, Weigel asked for an early release from her contract with the station after being reassigned to general news reporting duties. After that, Weigel did some freelance television reporting for ABC News' Chicago bureau and did some commercial and voiceover work. She also formed her own production company, JCW Productions, in 2002.

In 2005, Weigel began hosting and producing a weekly lifestyle magazine show on WMAQ-TV in Chicago called Taste.

In 2007, Weigel published her first book, Stay Tuned; Conversations With Dad From the Other Side, a book about her relationship with her late sportscaster father Tim Weigel and her spiritual attempts to contact him after his death. The next year, Weigel adapted the book into a one-woman show called "I'm Spiritual, Dammit!" at the Viaduct Theatre in Chicago. Her second book, "I'm Spiritual, Dammit!" was published in October 2010, and is being published in German, French, Spanish and the United Kingdom.

Weigel also has had several acting roles since beginning her television and radio career. In 1999, she played a television reporter in an episode of the series Early Edition, and in 2001, she played a news anchorwoman in the John Hughes movie New Port South. She played a TV news reporter on Chicago Fire in December 2014.

In July 2018, Weigel was hired as the director of community development for the Chicago Sun-Times newspaper.

In March 2019, Weigel signed on as the cohost of Mancow Muller's morning radio show on WLS-AM in Chicago.

== Personal ==
Weigel is the daughter of the late Tim Weigel, a longtime Chicago television sports and news anchor, and his first wife, former WGN-AM radio reporter Kathy Worthington. She also is the sister of television newscaster Rafer Weigel.

In June 1998, Weigel married Clay Champlin, a Chicago radio traffic and news reporter. They divorced in 2011.

Weigel has said that her parents added an extra "f" in her first name to differentiate her, given how common her first name is.
