= Fahey Flynn =

American broadcaster

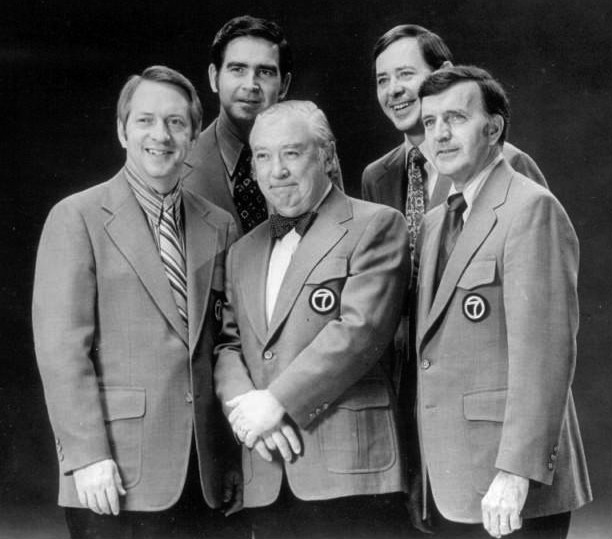
- Eyewitness News team, 1972. Back, from left: anchor John Drury, anchor Joel Daly. Front, from left: weatherman John Coleman, anchor Fahey Flynn, sportscaster Bill Frink.
- Born: August 6, 1916; Escanaba, Michigan, U.S.
- Died: August 8, 1983 (aged 67); Chicago, Illinois, U.S.
- Occupation: News Anchor
- Years active: 1953-1983
- Employer(s): WBBM-TV (1953-1968); WLS-TV (1968-1983)

Fahey Flynn (August 6, 1916 – August 8, 1983) was a radio and television newscaster who spent the majority of his career in Chicago. Robert Feder of the Chicago Sun-Times described him as "an avuncular Irishman with a jaunty bow tie [and] a twinkle in his eye".

A six-time Emmy winner, Flynn started his career in Fond du Lac, Wisconsin in 1934. Flynn worked in Chicago from 1941 until his death at a hospital there from internal hemorrhaging in 1983 at age 67. From 1953 to 1968, he was an anchor for WBBM-TV. He then joined Joel Daly as co-anchor at WLS-TV, and by 1971 the pair had become Chicago's highest-rated broadcasting team, retaining the lead in Chicago news ratings through 1979.

Flynn, a history and English major, graduated from the University of Wisconsin–Oshkosh in 1939 and received the distinguished alumni award in 1978.
