= Bill Frink =

American journalist

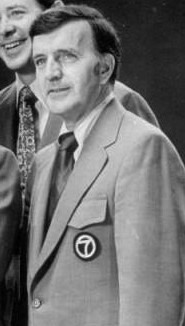
- Born: William R. Frink; July 31, 1926
- Died: July 1, 2005 (aged 78); Evanston, Illinois, U.S.
- Education: Northwestern University
- Occupation: Sportscaster
- Years active: 1950–1991
- Spouse: Willa Frink

William R. Frink (31 July 1926 – 1 July 2005) was an American former news presenter. He served as the sportscaster for Chicago's WLS-TV (an ABC-affiliate).

== News career ==
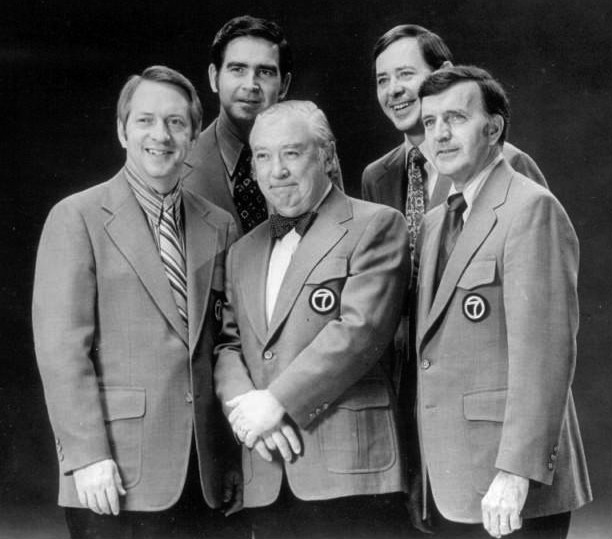
Eyewitness News team, 1972. Back, from left: anchor John Drury, anchor Joel Daly. Front, from left: weatherman John Coleman, anchor Fahey Flynn, sportscaster Bill Frink.

Bill Frink started his career in 1941 at WTRC in Elkhart, Indiana, as a radio sports announcer while still in high school. Frink broadcast sports for WXLI Guam Armed Forces Network while serving with the U.S. Navy in 1946. Upon his return from Guam, Frink spent four years at Northwestern University on the G.I. Bill. From 1947 to 1965, he was a radio and TV sports announcer for WEAW in Evanston, Illinois, for WILA in Gurney, Illinois, for WSGW in Saginaw, Michigan, for WIMA in Lima, Ohio, for WHAS in Louisville, Kentucky, for WCFL in Chicago, Illinois. For WCFL, he re-created White Sox games for radio broadcast from statistics provided on ticker tape machines.

At WLS in 1968, Frink was teamed with Fahey Flynn, Joel Daly and John Coleman to form the Eyewitness News team, creating a news brand name and establishing a highly successful new local news format derisively dubbed "happy talk" by a local television columnist. This style of local news has been widely copied. The team dominated Chicago television news ratings for more than a decade. During his time at Chicago's WLS-TV, Frink was one of Chicago's most popular sportscasters, known for his sense of humor and knowledge of sports.

In 1979, Frink spent ten weeks at ABC in New York before returning to Chicago to work for WGN Radio and TV until 1984. He then reported for KSTP Minneapolis hockey in 1983, Sports Time Cable in 1984, Group W Cable in 1986, Century Broadcasting in 1986, and Prime Cable in 1991. He retired from radio and TV in 1991 and taught broadcast journalism at the Medill School of Journalism at Northwestern University in his retirement.

In 2018, Frink was posthumously honored with the prestigious Silver Circle Award given by the Chicago / Midwest chapter of the National Academy of Television Arts & Sciences (NATAS). It honors outstanding individuals who have devoted 25 years or more to the television industry and who have made significant contributions to Chicago broadcasting.

== Personal life ==
Frink was born in 1926 in Elkhart, Indiana, the third child of a newspaper editor and teacher, Maurice Frink Sr., and Edith Raut Frink. He married Willa Allen Frink on March 20, 1949, and they had two daughters. Frink retired in 1991 to Evanston, Illinois, where he volunteered at the Mitchell Museum of the American Indian and the Reading Room of the Second Church of Christ, Scientist. He died in 2005.
