= Floyd Kalber =

American television journalist and anchor

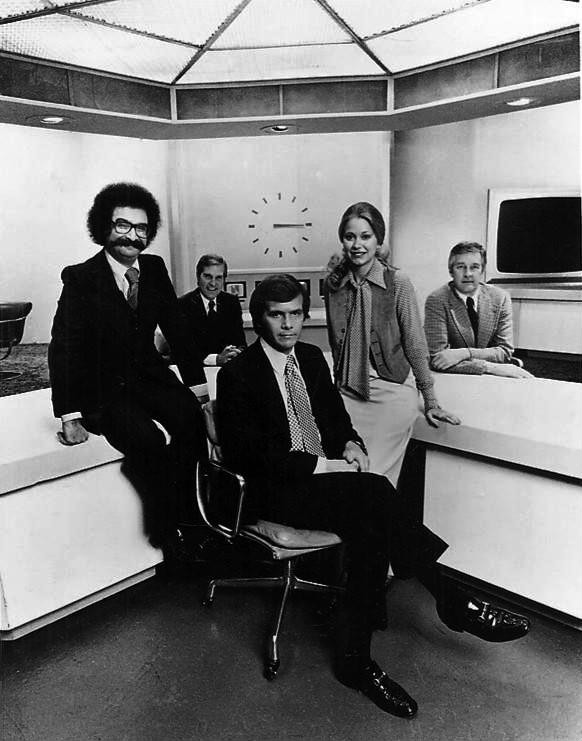
From The Today Show. Center: Tom Brokaw. From left: Gene Shalit, (background) Lew Wood, Jane Pauley, Floyd Kalber (at right).

Floyd Kalber (December 23, 1924 – May 13, 2004) was an American television journalist and anchorman, nicknamed "The Big Tuna."

== Life and career ==
Born in Omaha, Nebraska, he spent two years in the army during World War II and began his television career as KMTV-Omaha's first newscaster. It was at KMTV that he mentored his most famous protégé, Tom Brokaw.

Having attracted national attention for his coverage of the manhunt for mass-murderers Charles Starkweather and Caril Ann Fugate, in 1962 he became a popular anchorman for WNBQ-TV (later known as WMAQ), NBC's owned-and-operated station in Chicago. The 10 p.m. broadcast on weeknights, named NBC News Night Report, quickly became Chicago's top-rated news program and at one point, the most-watched television program in the city. It continued its ratings lead until WLS' introduction of the so-called "happy talk" news format in 1968.

In the late 1960s, Kalber also began doing five-minute news digests in early and late afternoon timeslots on NBC from the WMAQ studios, during which a national audience became familiar with his work. For a time in the early 1970s, he anchored Sunday broadcasts of NBC Nightly News. In 1975 WMAQ paired Kalber with the then-unknown Jane Pauley, who was recruited from WISH in Indianapolis; this arrangement did not succeed. Pauley left a year later to become the new co-anchor for NBC's Today Show.

Moving to national broadcasting for the NBC television network and departing WMAQ, Kalber was one of the most visible broadcasters in the country from 1976 to 1981 while anchoring the news on Today, working with hosts Brokaw and Pauley. Kalber was unhappy doing the Today show, and he left the program in late 1979. He remained with NBC News as a correspondent, after which he retired from the network in 1981. Kalber was coaxed back into broadcasting in 1984 by Chicago station WLS, where he anchored the 6 p.m. evening newscast until his final retirement in 1998. He died at his suburban Chicago home on May 13, 2004, after a long battle with emphysema. He was 79.
