= Mark Giangreco =

American sports journalist

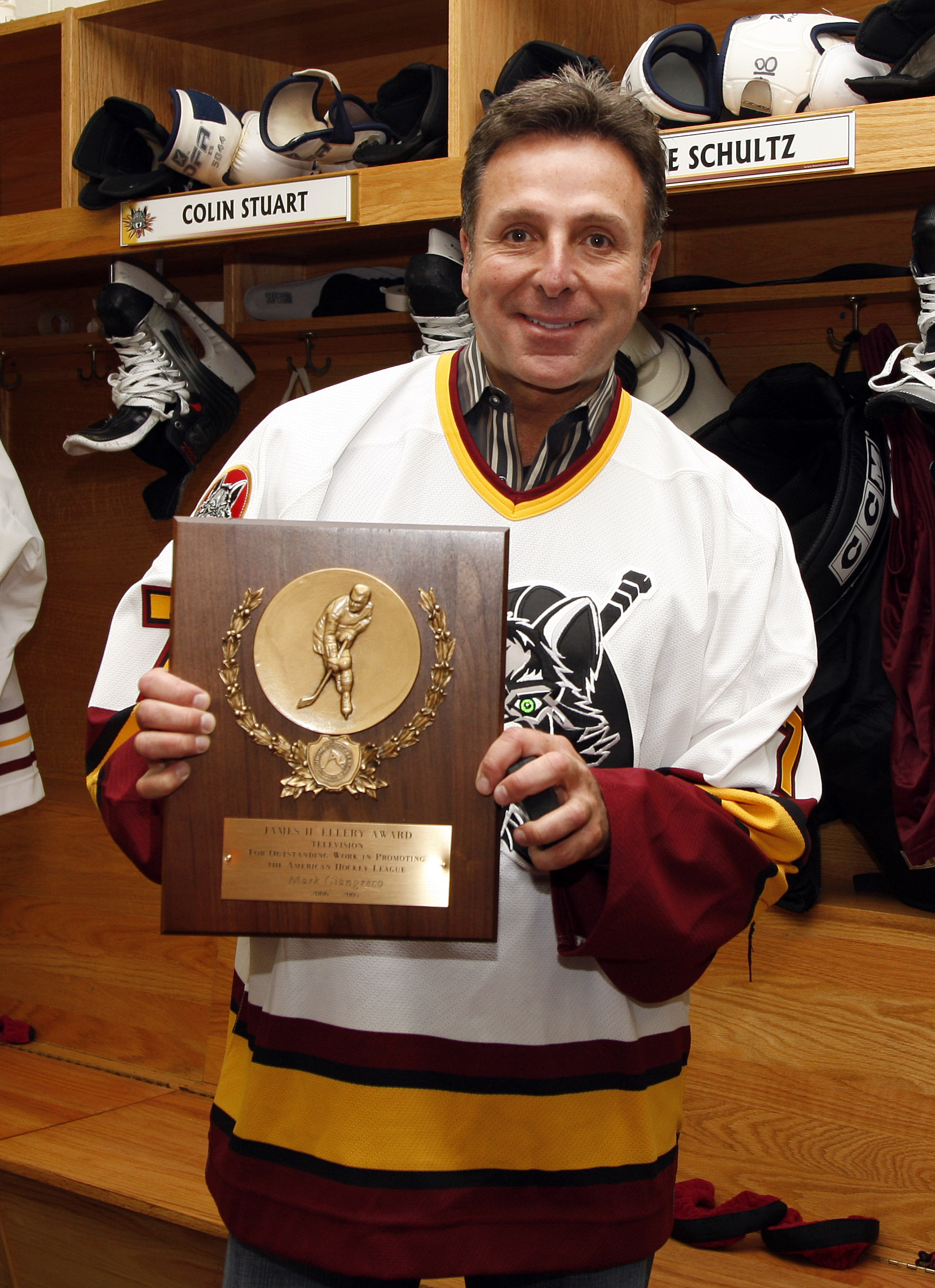
Giangreco in 2007

Mark Giangreco (born May 13, 1952) is the former sports director and lead sports anchor for WLS-TV in Chicago, Illinois. Until 2021, Giangreco had anchored the sports segment on ABC 7 during the 5 and 10 p.m. newscasts. He remains an ESPN Radio contributor.

== Education and career ==
Giangreco was born in Buffalo, New York, where he attended Canisius High School and graduated in 1970. He attended the University of Dayton in Dayton, Ohio. In college, he began his broadcasting career on WING Radio, under a shortened version of his name, Mark Greco. He graduated in 1974.

His first TV job was at the local NBC station in Dayton. Giangreco was employed there for less than a year when in 1978, he moved to Louisville, Kentucky. While working at WLKY, then an ABC affiliate, he worked under a shortened version of his name, Mark Greco. After only four years in Louisville, he moved to Chicago to work for WMAQ-TV. He remained there from 1982 to 1994 when he joined ABC7 in Chicago where he stayed until 2021. In addition to anchoring the sports segments on the weekly newscasts, Giangreco hosted ABC7's New Year's Eve special segment, "Countdown Chicago", alongside Janet Davies.

== Awards ==
Giangreco has won three Emmy Awards. He has also been honored with the prestigious Iris Award from the National Association of Television Program Executives. He has won two Peter Lisagor Awards and two Associated Press Awards for "Best Sportscast". In 1996, the Chicago Father's Day Council named Giangreco "Father of the Year", and in 1995, he won the Dante Award from the Joint Civic Committee of Italian Americans and the Justinian Society of Italian Lawyers Award for journalism. Giangreco was also honored in 1982 with the Louisville Journalism Award for his excellence in sports reporting.

== Suspensions ==
On February 19, 2017, Giangreco tweeted, "Donald Trump: a hateful ignorant corrupt simpleton supported by 87% of Republicans. So obvious, so disturbing America exposed [sic] as a country full of simpletons who allowed this cartoon lunatic to be 'elected'." He was suspended by ABC for his comments that were said to be "not in line with ABC 7 Chicago's non-partisan editorial standards."

On January 28, 2021, Giangreco referred to news anchor Cheryl Burton as "ditzy" after covering a 10pm sports section of the newscast and he was removed from the air; later in March of the same year the station officially fired him.

== Family ==
Giangreco has two brothers: Thomas Giangreco, a medical device consultant in Buffalo, New York, and Pete Giangreco, a Democratic Party political consultant who has worked on seven presidential campaigns, including the 2008 presidential campaign for then-Senator Barack Obama.
