= Jim Rose (sports anchor) =

American sports anchor (born 1953)

- Born: July 5, 1953 (age 73); Providence, RI
- Education: Rhode Island College
- Occupation: Former Sports Director/Anchor – ABC7 Chicago (WLS-TV) (1982–2023)
- Years active: 1982–2023
- Spouse: Lakesha Draine (m. 2011)
- Children: 2

Jim Rose (born July 5, 1953) is an American former sports anchor. Rose worked for ABC 7 Chicago (WLS-TV), the ABC affiliate in Chicago, Illinois; joining the station in January 1982. Prior to working at WLS-TV, Rose worked for WIXT-TV in Syracuse, New York. He retired after 41 years broadcasting at ABC 7 Chicago (WLS-TV) on September 15, 2023.

== Personal ==
Rose has been married to Lakesha DRAINE since July 2011. Rose has two children, Jayson David Rose and Suzette Elise (Rose) Godard. Rose was a soldier in the United States Army from March 1972 through March 1975, he was Sports Director of AFN TV, Berlin Germany from March 1973 to March 1975. He was Sports anchor AFN Radio from January 1973 to March 1973. Rose was weekend anchor at WPRI TV, Providence, Rhode Island, from April 1975 to May 1977. Rose was Sports anchor at WIXT – TV, Syracuse, New York, May 1977 to April 1982. Rose was weekend sports anchor at WLS TV, Chicago Illinois, from April 1982 to May 1985. Rose was weekday Sports anchor from May 1985 to January 2021. Rose was Sports Director from January 2021 until his retirement on September 15, 2023.
