= Dick Johnson (reporter) =

American reporter (1953–2020)

- Born: October 1953
- Died: June 9, 2020 (aged 66)
- Spouse: Lauren M Johnson
- Children: 3

Richard S. Johnson (October 1953 – June 9, 2020) was the morning news co-anchor and a street reporter for the NBC-owned television station WMAQ-TV in Chicago. Before coming to WMAQ-TV in 2002, he was a longtime reporter/anchor at rival WLS-TV.

Johnson won numerous awards, including the DuPont-Columbia Award (the broadcast equivalent of the Pulitzer Prize) and the Emmy Award.

Johnson was also the producer for the summer play productions put on by the Community House in Hinsdale, Illinois. In 2006, he produced Oliver! One year later, in the summer of 2007, he performed as Franklin D. Roosevelt in Annie.

He died on June 9, 2020, following days of respiratory complications. He was being treated at a northern Michigan hospital at the time of death.
