= WLS-TV =

Television station in Chicago

- Chicago, Illinois; United States
- Channels: Digital: 22 (UHF), shared with WXFT-DT; Virtual: 7
- Branding: ABC 7 Chicago; ABC 7 Eyewitness News

Programming
- Affiliations: 7.1: ABC; 7.2: Localish; 7.3: Charge!

Ownership
- Owner: ABC Owned Television Stations; (WLS Television, Inc.)

History
- First air date: September 17, 1948
- Former call signs: WENR-TV (1948–1953); WBKB (1953–1965); WBKB-TV (1965–1968)
- Former channel numbers: Analog: 7 (VHF, 1948–2009); Digital: 52 (UHF, 1996–2009), 7 (VHF, June–October 2009), 44 (UHF, October 2009–2019); Translator: 7 (VHF, 2009–2013)
- Former affiliations: Tele1st (OTA subscription television, 1984 overnights)
- Call sign meaning: derived from former sister station WLS radio

Technical information
- Licensing authority: FCC
- Facility ID: 73226
- ERP: 1,000 kW
- HAAT: 518 m (1,699 ft)
- Transmitter coordinates: 41°52′44″N 87°38′8″W

Links
- Public license information: Public file; LMS
- Website: abc7chicago.com

WLS-TV (channel 7) is a television station in Chicago, Illinois, United States. It has been owned and operated by the ABC television network through its ABC Owned Television Stations division since the station's inception. WLS-TV's studios are located on North State Street in the Chicago Loop, and its transmitter is located atop the Willis Tower.

== History ==
=== WENR-TV (1948–1953) ===
The station first signed on the air on September 17, 1948, as WENR-TV. It was the third television station to sign on in the Chicago market behind WGN-TV (channel 9), which debuted six months earlier in April, and WBKB (channel 4), which changed from an experimental station to a commercial operation in September 1946. As one of the original ABC-owned stations on channel 7, it was the second station to begin operations after WJZ-TV in New York City, and before WXYZ-TV in Detroit, KGO-TV in San Francisco and KECA-TV in Los Angeles.

The station's original call letters were taken from co-owned radio station WENR (890 AM), which served as an affiliate of the ABC Radio Network (WENR eventually merged with WLS, with which it shared a frequency under a time-sharing arrangement until ABC purchased a 50% interest in WLS in 1954).

=== WBKB-TV (1953–1968) ===
In February 1953, ABC merged with United Paramount Theatres (UPT), the former theater division of Paramount Pictures. UPT subsidiary Balaban and Katz owned WBKB (which shared a CBS affiliation with WGN-TV). The newly merged American Broadcasting-Paramount Theatres, as the company was known then, could not keep both stations because of Federal Communications Commission (FCC) regulations then enforced that forbade the common ownership of two television stations licensed to the same market. As a result, WBKB's channel 4 license was sold to CBS, which subsequently changed that station's call letters to WBBM-TV; that outlet would move to VHF channel 2 several months later on July 5, 1953. The old WBKB's on-air and behind-the-scenes staff stayed at the new WBBM-TV, while the WBKB call letters and management moved to channel 7 (from 1965 to 1968, a "-TV" suffix was included in the station's calls, modifying it to WBKB-TV).

Sterling "Red" Quinlan served as WBKB's general manager from the early 1950s to the mid-1960s, and became a giant in early Chicago television. Quinlan was instrumental in starting the careers of Tom Duggan, Frank Reynolds and Bob Newhart. The station courageously aired The Tom Duggan Show in the mid-1950s, which became the most popular show in the Chicago market, far outdrawing other network competition.

=== WLS-TV (1968–present) ===
Channel 7 had its call letters changed to WLS-TV on October 7, 1968, named after WLS radio, which ABC had wholly owned since 1959 when the network bought the 50% interest it did not already hold in the station from the Prairie Farmer magazine. ABC had merged WLS with WENR, its shared-time partner, in 1954.

In 1963, Al Parker joined the station as an announcer and worked in that capacity for 26 years. Until his departure, he also served as an announcer for AM Chicago and The Oprah Winfrey Show. He died September 30, 2000, at the age of 74.

WLS-TV had claimed to be "Chicago's first television station" in its sign-ons and sign-offs during its first three decades (implying a connection with the original WBKB on channel 4), but admitted to its true roots with WENR-TV with its 30th anniversary in 1978.

On January 17, 1984, WLS-TV launched Tele1st, an ABC-owned overnight subscription television service that carried a mix of films and lifestyle programs for four hours per night six days a week after the station's sign-off at 2 a.m.; the service was similar in format to competitor ONTV (which was carried locally on WSNS-TV, channel 44) and other over-the-air pay services that existed during the early and mid-1980s. Tele1st was created with the concept of allowing users to record programming for later viewing; therefore, its decoder boxes were designed to unencrypt the signal only with the aid of a VCR. Scrambling codes that were sent to the box and relayed to the VCR were changed on a monthly basis, requiring subscribers to record additional footage airing immediately before and after that night's schedule to retrieve codes to play back the recorded programs properly; this resulted in any recordings being viewable only during that calendar month. Tele1st was deemed a failure, attributing only 4,000 subscribers at its peak, and ceased operations on June 30, 1984.

In 1988, WLS-TV agreed to sell production rights to The Oprah Winfrey Show to her Harpo Productions company, but ABC O&Os continued to air the show until the end of its run in 2011.

== Programming ==
WLS-TV currently airs the Weekend Adventure educational programming block and the network's political/news discussion program This Week one hour later than most ABC stations due to its weekend morning newscasts.

=== Network programs time-shifted ===
- From that program's debut in January 2003, WLS-TV aired Jimmy Kimmel Live! on a one-hour delay at 12:02 a.m. as the station aired reruns of The Oprah Winfrey Show at 11:02 p.m. after Nightline (this practice ended after Oprah—by then in reruns, as the daytime talk show aired its last episode that May—discontinued its syndication run on September 9, 2011; Kimmel was subsequently moved to 11:02 p.m. three days later on September 12).
- For many years, WLS-TV was the only ABC owned-and-operated station that did not carry Live with Kelly and Mark in its various incarnations. Live's traditional 9 a.m. timeslot was occupied on Channel 7 by Oprah prior to the former program's national debut in September 1986 until May 2011, and later by Windy City Live from May 2011 to September 2013; the program—which is produced by New York City sister station WABC-TV—had, however, occasionally aired in an overnight timeslot on WLS from 1991 to 1993 and again from 1999 to 2002. Other Chicago stations that aired Live in a daytime slot included WFLD (1990–1991 and 1997–1999), WBBM-TV (1993–1995) and WGN-TV (1995–1997 and 2002–2013). On September 2, 2013, Live with Kelly and Mark (at the time was named Live with Kelly and Michael) moved to WLS-TV (from WGN-TV), with Windy City Live being bumped to 11 a.m. as a result.
- From its premiere in September 2019 until September 2021, WLS-TV was the only ABC-owned station not to carry Tamron Hall, due to a lack of a viable timeslot in its daytime schedule. Independent station WCIU-TV (channel 26) carried it for its first two seasons, with the show moving to WLS-TV in the third season after the end of Windy City Live.

=== Other WLS-TV produced programs ===
- 190 North – a local lifestyle program (named after the station's studio address at 190 North State Street in the Loop) formerly hosted by Janet Davies; the show began broadcasting in 1998 and then in high-definition on May 6, 2007. The show ran on Sundays at 11 p.m., with a rebroadcast on Saturday nights from 1998 to 2013. It returned later in 2013 in a retooled format, only airing a few times a year.
- Let's Dish – a food-based travel program produced by WLS-TV for the Live Well Network, and shown locally on digital channel 7.2.
- Windy City Weekend – a weekly lifestyle program that formerly served as a weekday afternoon talk show with a live audience known as Windy City Live, hosted by Ryan Chiaverini and Valerie Warner that premiered as a daily program on May 26, 2011, replacing The Oprah Winfrey Show. Initially airing weekdays at 9 a.m., the live telecast moved to 11 a.m. on September 2, 2013, and at 1 p.m. on June 27, 2016, with reruns airing at 2 p.m. (on digital subchannel 7.2) and at 12:07 a.m. (after ABC's Nightline). The show ended after 10 years as a daily program on September 3, 2021; it later recast as a weekly program, known as Windy City Weekend on September 10, 2021, and it airs Fridays at 11:30 a.m.
- Since 1991, the station has broadcast a local New Year's Eve special known as Countdown Chicago.

=== Former WLS-TV produced programs ===
- The Chicago Huddle – a local sports program about the Chicago Bears hosted by Ryan Chiaverini. The program aired Sundays 10:30 a.m. during the NFL season until during the 2009-10 Bears season.
- Chicagoing – a local public affairs program hosted by Bill Campbell. Aired on Sunday mornings at 11:30 a.m., the program ran its final broadcast on December 26, 2010.

=== Former syndicated programming produced in Chicago ===
- At the Movies – nationally syndicated film review program, produced at WLS-TV's studios, and distributed by Disney-ABC Domestic Television. It aired Saturdays 10:35 p.m. with reruns Sundays 10:30 a.m. The program aired its final original broadcast on August 14, 2010.
- The Oprah Winfrey Show – previously a local program A.M. Chicago, it received the name about one year after Oprah Winfrey began hosting. The program was created by WLS-TV, but was later produced by Harpo Productions and CBS Television Distribution at Oprah's Harpo Studios. It aired weekdays at 9 a.m., in both its local and syndicated incarnations. The program ended with its final original broadcast airing on May 25, 2011. Reruns continued weeknights at 11:02 p.m. until September 9, 2011.

=== Sports programming ===
WLS-TV is the local over-the-air host of Monday Night Football games involving the Chicago Bears, airing simulcasts of the team's ESPN-televised games (WLS-TV's corporate parent, The Walt Disney Company, owns 80% of ESPN, and the ABC Owned Television Stations have right of first refusal for simulcasts of ESPN's NFL telecasts within a team's home market). Because of this, atypical for a network-owned station outside of breaking news and severe weather coverage necessitating such situations, the station has had to reschedule ABC network programs preempted by the telecasts. The preseason and MNF telecasts mark the only NFL games to have aired on WLS-TV since ABC lost the rights to NFL games in 2006; during the regular season, Bears games are rotated between WBBM-TV (through the NFL on CBS), WMAQ-TV (through NBC Sunday Night Football) and especially WFLD (through the NFL on Fox). Since 2010, however, it has deferred the right of first refusal due to the popularity and live voting requirements of ABC's Dancing with the Stars, with WCIU-TV carrying the MNF games when the former program's fall season is ongoing (an exception being WLS' carriage of an MNF Bears game against the Dallas Cowboys on December 9, 2013, when the team honored former head coach Mike Ditka, after the DWTS fall season had already ended).

On December 12, 2014, WLS-TV signed a new five-year broadcast agreement with the Chicago Cubs, in which WLS televised 25 of the Major League Baseball team's games per year, starting with the 2015 season. The arrangement partially replaced one with WGN-TV (which had broadcast Cubs games since its inception in April 1948), which voluntarily pulled out of its existing broadcast deal with the team for the 2015 season and subsequently agreed to carry a reduced slate of 45 games. The WLS broadcasts were seen on DirecTV's version of MLB Extra Innings, and the feed provided was the WLS signal seen in the Chicago market (unlike with the feeds of WGN broadcasts, where public service announcements were seen in place of local commercials and station promos).

As ABC has a limited sports programming schedule during the Major League Baseball season prior to September (when the MLB regular season and college football season overlap), the station mainly carried the team's weekend daytime games in order to limit preemption of the network's prime time programming. The deal (along with all of the Cubs' broadcast television deals) ended after the 2019 season, when the team launched the cable-only Marquee Sports Network to carry their game telecasts.

WLS-TV also carries select Chicago Bulls games as part of their NBA on ABC telecasts.

From 1999 to 2004 and again since 2021, WLS-TV carries select Chicago Blackhawks games as part of their NHL on ABC telecasts.

=== News operation ===
WLS-TV's ABC 7 Eyewitness News logo, in use since 2024.

WLS-TV broadcasts 41 hours, 25 minutes of locally produced newscasts each week (with 6 hours, 5 minutes each weekday; 5 1/2 hours on Saturdays; and five hours on Sundays). WLS-TV also contracts with iHeartMedia to provide weather forecasts for their Chicago market stations, including WLIT-FM (93.9), WCHI-FM (95.5), WVAZ (102.7), WKSC-FM (103.5), and WGCI-FM (107.5).

==== News department history ====
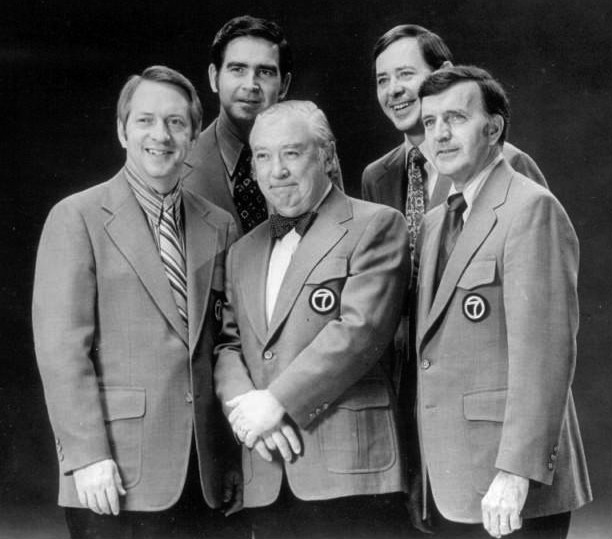
WLS-TV's main Eyewitness News team, 1972. Back, from left: anchor John Drury, anchor Joel Daly. Front, from left: weatherman John Coleman, anchor Fahey Flynn, sportscaster Bill Frink.

In 1969, WLS-TV adopted the Eyewitness News format that the other ABC owned-and-operated stations began implementing in the late 1960s, after the news format was popularized when it originated at New York City flagship WABC-TV. Beginning in 1968, the station's main evening newscasts were co-anchored by Fahey Flynn, a bowtie-wearing broadcaster who had spent the previous 15 years at WBBM-TV; and Joel Daly, who was hired away by WLS from WJW-TV in Cleveland in 1967. The duo served as the anchors of the station's 6 and 10 p.m. newscasts until Flynn's death in August 1983. In 1970, the two were joined by John Drury, who helmed the 5 p.m. newscast. By 1973, WLS' Eyewitness News broadcasts surpassed NBC-owned WMAQ-TV (channel 5)'s newscasts to become Chicago's top-rated news operation, a lead it held until WBBM-TV surpassed channel 7 for the top spot in 1979. For much of the 1970s and 1980s, it waged a spirited battle for second place in the Chicago news ratings between its two main competitors.

Around the time of Flynn's death, Channel 7 had been experiencing a ratings decline, prompting major changes to the station's management. ABC hired Bill Applegate from WNEV-TV in Boston (now WHDH) as the station's news director. Shortly after, general manager Peter Desnoes resigned to co-found Burnham Broadcasting. His replacement was Chicago native Dennis Swanson, who worked for WGN-TV and WMAQ-TV before becoming news director at ABC's Los Angeles station, KABC-TV. ABC also commissioned Frank Gari to compose an updated version of the Cool Hand Luke "Tar Sequence" theme widely associated with the Eyewitness News format. The result was "News Series 2000", a theme package that was quickly picked up by other ABC O&Os and affiliates.

Upon his return to Chicago, Swanson would be tasked with finding a replacement for Flynn on the 6 p.m. news, as well as a new host for its AM Chicago program after host Robb Weller departed for New York City. He responded to the latter by bringing in Oprah Winfrey, at the time the host of People Are Talking on ABC's then-affiliate in Baltimore, WJZ-TV.

Within a year, the program had moved to first place in the ratings. AM Chicago entered into national syndication in 1986 and was renamed The Oprah Winfrey Show. Channel 7 was the flagship station for the show, and it, along with most of ABC's other owned-and-operated stations, carried it until it went out of production in September 2011. Swanson also re-hired lead anchor John Drury, who had left for WGN-TV in 1979; and Floyd Kalber, who had led WMAQ-TV to the top of the ratings in the 1960s. Drury and Mary Ann Childers were a popular anchor team at WLS-TV during the 1980s and 1990s, accompanied by weather anchor Steve Deshler and sports anchor Tim Weigel. In March 1986, channel 7 passed WBBM-TV as the highest-rated news station in Chicago. It has held the lead ever since, aside from a brief period when WBBM-TV forged a tie for first in the late 1980s.

In 1992, the station replaced the "News Series 2000" package (as the other ABC O&Os did over the following year, due partly to increased royalties for use of the Cool Hand Luke theme and its variants by the original theme's composer, Lalo Schifrin) with a new news music package, also produced by Gari, called "News Series 2000 Plus" (since renamed "Stimulus"), which has remained in use by WLS ever since and was updated in 2013. In 1996, WLS-TV dropped the Eyewitness News brand after 26 years, in favor of the network-centric ABC 7 News; the move was part of a standard branding effort imposed by ABC across its owned-and-operated stations which saw the incorporation of the ABC name into their local brands (most of the other ABC O&Os retained their existing news branding, as sister stations such as WABC-TV and WPVI-TV in Philadelphia retained their Eyewitness News or Action News identities).

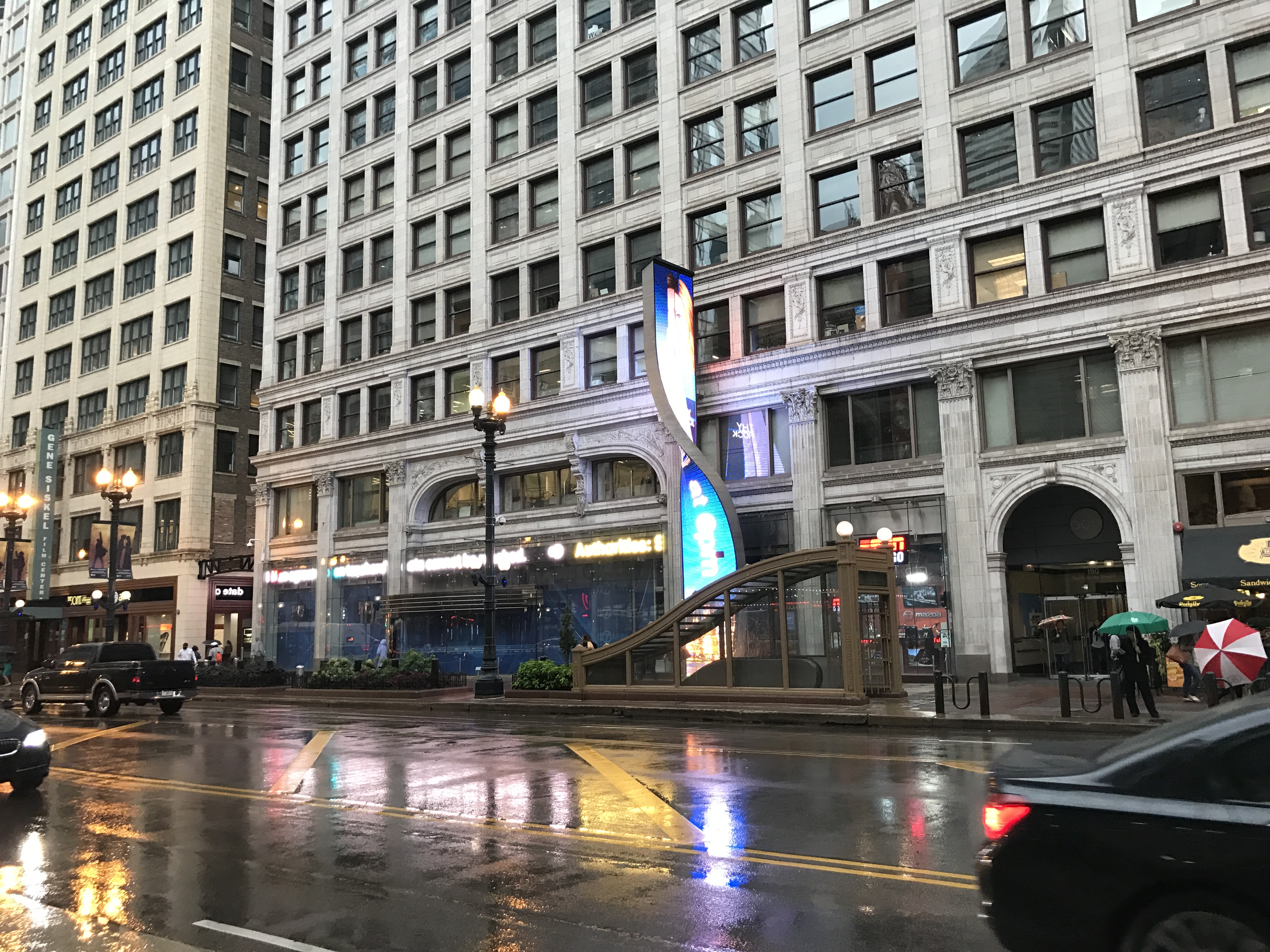
WLS-TV's street-side studios at 190 N. State Street during a 6 p.m. newscast closed to public viewing; sister radio station WMVP also maintains a streetside studio directly north in the same building.

WLS-TV debuted a street-side studio at its North State Street facility on April 10, 2006, during the station's morning newscast, although the station had begun broadcasting its newscasts from that studio two days earlier on April 8. On the weekend of April 29–30, 2006, WLS-TV upgraded its news helicopter with a high definition camera, rebranding it as "Chopper 7 HD". On January 6, 2007, WLS-TV became the first Chicago television station to broadcast all of its local programming—including newscasts—in high definition, although most remote field footage remained in 16:9 widescreen standard definition at the time. Since then, WLS-TV upgraded most of its field footage to HD, although some field reports remain in widescreen SD.

On December 23, 2007, a Mazda MPV minivan drove through a reinforced studio window at the State Street Studio two minutes into the 10 p.m. newscast, startling anchor Ravi Baichwal on air and creating a 20-degree draft as the glass shattered upon the car's impact; no one was injured in the crash. Evanston resident Gerald Richardson was subsequently charged with felony damage to property for the incident. On November 11, 2012, WLS-TV expanded its Sunday 8 a.m. newscast from 1 1/2 to two hours, leading into ABC's This Week. The 8 a.m. portion of the Saturday morning newscast was expanded to two hours from 8 to 10 a.m. on August 24, 2013. Nearly a week later on August 30, WLS-TV discontinued its hour-long weekday 11 a.m. newscast (which originated in 1992 as a half-hour program at 11:30, before it expanded into an earlier, one-hour broadcast on October 6, 2003, following the cancellation of Port Charles) after 21 years, and replaced it on September 2 with Windy City Live, whose original 9 a.m. slot became occupied by Live! with Kelly and Michael when it moved to WLS from WGN-TV on that date (as such, it became the first – and currently, the only – ABC owned-and-operated station without a midday newscast). With the move and the midday newscast's cancellation, news and weather cut-ins were incorporated into Windy City Live.

On October 26, 2013, WLS-TV reintroduced the Eyewitness News brand (as ABC 7 Eyewitness News), as part of an overall rebranding of its newscasts that included new graphics and a modernized update to the "Stimulus" theme. In an interview with media columnist Robert Feder, WLS-TV president/general manager John Idler said the reasoning behind the restoration of the Eyewitness News brand, was that it "[still] resonated strongly with [viewers in] the Chicago market", despite being dropped by the station 17 years earlier. On November 2, 2013, WLS expanded the early block of its weekend morning newscasts, with the extension of its hour-long 6 a.m. newscast on Saturdays and Sundays to two hours at 5 a.m.

On February 10, 2014, WLS-TV entered into a partnership agreement with the Chicago Sun-Times to include the use of the station's weather team in the newspaper's weather section, replacing WMAQ-TV, whose previous partnership ended the day before; in addition, the station would air a 'look ahead' of the newspaper's front page and stories, with the Sun-Times promoting WLS's newscasts and programming in turn.

On December 14, 2014, WLS-TV entered into a news share agreement with WCIU-TV to produce a weeknight-only 7 p.m. newscast titled ABC 7 Eyewitness News at 7:00 on The U; the program debuted on January 12, 2015, and is the fifth newscast produced by ABC O&O for a separately owned station in the station's home market (along with existing programs produced by sister stations in Raleigh, Philadelphia, San Francisco and Los Angeles for WLFL, WPHL-TV, KOFY-TV and KDOC-TV in the respective markets, and a since-canceled newscast produced by KFSN-TV for KAIL in Fresno).

On June 27, 2016, WLS-TV revived its 11 a.m. newscasts for the first time since 2013, becoming the fourth television station in Chicago to do so; which completes against WMAQ-TV (who revived its midday newscasts in September 2011 and moved to the time period in September 2014), WBBM-TV (who began airing a half-hour 11 a.m. newscasts in early 2000s), and WGN-TV (who began its midday newscasts in 1984; followed by some expansions in September 2008 and October 2009). In June 2016, after several years of unsuccessful syndicated talk show replacements for the canceled All My Children (including Katie and FABLife), the station moved General Hospital to 2 p.m., then Windy City Live to 1 p.m. to accommodate the 11 a.m. newscast, with a replay of the latter late night after Nightline.

On July 29, 2019, it was announced that WLS-TV would end its news share agreement with WCIU-TV, ending the weeknight program for that station, the 7 p.m. newscast ABC 7 Eyewitness News at 7:00 on The U after 4 years, with the final broadcast on August 30 of that same year. The mutual parting of ways came as WCIU became the market's CW affiliate on September 1, leaving no room for a newscast on the station's schedule.

On June 19, 2023, WLS-TV debuted its new on-air look for the first time in a decade as it was the first ABC owned-and-operated station to unveil its new standard graphics package.

==== Ratings ====
According to the Nielsen local news ratings for the February 2011 sweeps period, WLS-TV remained in first place overall, with the 10 p.m. newscast getting a 9.7 rating share, down a tenth of a point from a 9.8 during the same time the previous year. The station remained in second place for its prime time lead-in.

==== On-air staff ====
- Cheryl Burton – anchor
- Ryan Chiaverini – Windy City Weekend host; also host of Countdown Chicago
- Chuck Goudie – chief investigative reporter
- Diane Pathieu – reporter and fill-in anchor
- Mark Schanowski – freelance sports anchor (also with NBC Sports Chicago)
- Tom Waddle – NFL contributor

==== Former on-air staff ====
- Mike Adamle
- Diane Allen
- Jim Avila
- Roberta Baskin
- Kathy Brock
- Diann Burns
- Jann Carl
- Susan Carlson
- Mary Ann Childers
- Lauren Cohn
- John Coleman^{†}
- Joel Daly^{†}
- Steve Dolinsky
- Alex Dreier^{†}
- John Drury^{†}
- Tom Duggan^{†}
- Roger Ebert^{†}
- Steve Edwards
- Russ Ewing^{†}
- Fahey Flynn^{†}
- Sandi Freeman
- Bill Frink^{†}
- Judie Garcia
- Mark Giangreco
- Dick Johnson^{†}
- Rob Johnson
- Jack Jones^{†}
- Floyd Kalber^{†}
- Tal Kopan
- Alan Krashesky
- Ron Magers
- Larry Moore
- Johnny Mountain
- Terry Murphy
- Kent Ninomiya
- Sylvia Perez
- Kim Peterson
- Bob Petty^{†}
- Dan Ponce
- Frank Reynolds^{†}
- Charlie Rose
- Jim Rose
- Jim Rosenfield
- Jerry Taft^{†}
- Rafer Weigel
- Tim Weigel^{†}
- Robb Weller
- Oprah Winfrey
- Linda Yu

^{^[†]} Indicates deceased

== Studios ==
WLS-TV's studios at 190 North State Street include the former State-Lake Theatre's gutted and converted interior.

Beginning in 1959, Playboy's first television show, Playboy's Penthouse, filmed for two years at 190 North State Street.

== Technical information ==
=== Subchannels ===
Subchannels of WLS-TV and WXFT-DT
License	Subchannel	Res.	Short name	Programming
WLS-TV	7.1	720p	WLS-HD	ABC
WLS-TV	7.2	480i	LOCLish	Localish
WLS-TV	7.3	480i	CHARGE	Charge!
WXFT-DT	60.1	720p	WXFT-DT	UniMás
WXFT-DT	60.2	480i	ION MYS	Ion Mystery
WXFT-DT	60.3	480i	Quest	Quest

Prior to February 24, 2011, WLS-DT3 carried ABC 7 News NOW, featuring local news and weather and national/sidebar content from The Local AccuWeather Channel. The ABC O&Os discontinued their Local AccuWeather channels on February 24, 2011, replacing its programming with a letterboxed standard-definition simulcast of their Live Well subchannels, though AccuWeather's content/branding agreement with ABCOTS, including WLS-TV, continued unchanged. WLS-DT3 formerly served as a charter affiliate of Laff diginet from its launch in January 2015. To accommodate the WXFT channel share which took effect in December 2017, WLS-TV discontinued the third Laff subchannel, which shifted over to a subchannel of WXFT's sister station, WGBO-DT2, and reduced the Live Well feed from a reduced-bitrate 720p broadcast to a 480i format. After WLS moved to their new channel post-spectrum transition, it soon picked up This TV after ABCOTS picked up the network for their stations in the spring of 2021.

=== Analog-to-digital conversion ===
WLS-TV shut down its analog signal, over VHF channel 7, at noon on June 12, 2009, the official date on which full-power television stations in the United States transitioned from analog to digital broadcasts under federal mandate. The station's digital signal relocated from its pre-transition UHF channel 52, which was among the high band UHF channels (52–69) that were removed from broadcast use as a result of the transition, to its analog-era VHF channel 7.

WLS operated its digital signal at low power (4.75 kW) to protect the digital signal of NBC affiliate WOOD-TV in Grand Rapids, Michigan (which also broadcasts on channel 7, but at a much higher radiated power). As a result, many viewers were not able to receive the station. The FCC sent extra personnel to Chicago, Philadelphia and New York City to deal with difficulties in those cities. WLS had received 1,735 calls just by the end of the day on June 12 (WBBM only received 600), and an estimated 5,000 calls in total by June 16.

WLS-TV was just one station which needed to increase its signal strength or move its frequency to solve its problems, but a power increase required making sure no other stations were affected. WLS received a two-week experimental permit for a power increase late in June. WLS had also applied for a permit to construct a low-power fill-in digital translator station on UHF channel 32 (the former analog frequency of WFLD), but abandoned that plan (the channel 32 RF frequency has since been claimed by WMEU-CD). Eventually the FCC granted it a permit to transmit on a second frequency, UHF channel 44, formerly occupied by WSNS-TV; WLS announced the availability of that frequency on October 31, 2009.

Throughout construction of the new maximized transmitting facilities at the Willis Tower, WLS operated both channels 7 and 44 from its auxiliary facilities at the John Hancock Center under an STA. WLS operated channel 7 as a fill-in translator with a power of 7 kW, and operating their full power operations on channel 44 with a power of 1 MW. Through the use of virtual channel technology, both operating frequencies were re-mapped and displayed as channel 7, which would cause some digital tuners to have two versions of virtual channels 7.1, 7.2 and 7.3, while tuning sequentially. In October 2012, WLS-TV completed construction from the Willis Tower and its operating channel 44 at the 1 million watt power level. The station continued its dual-frequency operations until 12:03 p.m. on March 18, 2013, when WLS-TV formally ceased operations on VHF channel 7, leaving UHF channel 44 as its permanent allotment. Since WLS-TV officially moved its full-power operations to channel 44, it is the only ABC-owned station to vacate its former analog allotment for its digital operations and the second ABC O&O to operate its full-power operations on the UHF band, after Fresno sister station KFSN-TV (which was forced onto UHF in 1961 when it was a CBS affiliate, as the FCC preferred Fresno to be a "UHF island").

On June 12, 2017, WLS-TV's parent company ABC Owned Television Stations and Univision Communications announced they would enter into a channel sharing agreement following the sale of the over-the-air spectrum of UniMás owned-and-operated station WXFT-DT in the FCC's spectrum reallocation auction for $126.1 million on April 13, 2017; as mentioned above, the transition of WXFT to the WLS-TV spectrum occurred eight months later. During the 2019 digital television repack, the station relocated from UHF channel 44 as it was no longer allocated to broadcast television and is now broadcasting on UHF channel 22.

== See also ==
- WLS (AM)
- Circle 7 logo
- Eyewitness News
- List of three-letter broadcast call signs in the United States
