= Windy City Live =

- Also known as: WCL
- Genre: Talk show
- Presented by: Val Warner; Ryan Chiaverini
- Country of origin: United States
- Original language: English
- No. of seasons: 10 (2020–2021 Season)
- No. of episodes: 2,000+

Production
- Executive producer: Hank Mendheim
- Production locations: WLS-TV ABC7 Studios, Chicago, Illinois
- Camera setup: Multiple
- Running time: 40-45 minutes
- Production companies: WLS-TV (2011–2021)

Original release
- Network: Syndicated, ABC O&Os and Affiliates
- Release: May 26, 2011 – September 3, 2021

Windy City Live (WCL) is a local daytime talk show that broadcast on WLS-TV in Chicago, Illinois. It premiered on May 26, 2011 as a replacement of The Oprah Winfrey Show which retired that month and is produced by WLS-TV (ABC 7 Chicago). The talk show was filmed in front of a live audience at the ABC7 Studios in the Chicago Loop on State Street. The hosts were Val Warner and Ryan Chiaverini.

In November 2019, Windy City Live aired its 2,000th live episode with multiple special guests and performances. Windy City Live maintained strong viewership ratings, and was nominated for and won numerous Chicago Emmy awards.

On July 21, 2021, WLS-TV cancelled Windy City Live. Production ceased on September 3, 2021. The show morphed into 'Windy City Weekend' a half-hour, weekly addition to ABC7 Eyewitness News at 11am, airing Fridays at 11:30am.

== Concept ==
Windy City Live combined talk, entertainment, celebrity guest appearances, localized Chicago interests, and more in a 60-minute show. Original co-hosts Val Warner and Ryan Chiaverini are joined by guest contributors Roe Conn, an American talk radio host, and television producer Hank Mendheim. Ji Suk Yi had also served as a contributor and later co-host of the show until her departure for the Chicago Sun-Times in 2018.

In July 2018, Bonnie Hunt, former host of The Bonnie Hunt Show, co-hosted WCL with Chiaverini while Warner was away on vacation.

=== Celebrity appearances ===
Through the years, celebrity and special guest visits on Windy City Live have included: Anthony Anderson, Chance The Rapper, Chloe Lukasiak, Dan Abrams, David Muir, Diane Sawyer, Tory Burch, Jenifer Lewis, Valerie Jarrett, LaVar Ball, Masi Oka, G Eazy, Rick Bayless, Garry McCarthy, Shea Couleé, Sinbad, Nick Cannon, Jay Pharoah, Brett Eldredge, Kevin Hart, Mr. T, Michael Pfleger, Carla Hall, Chris Redd, Rahm Emanuel, Pat Quinn, Jennifer Hudson, Brian Urlacher, Martha Stewart, Jimmy Kimmel, Rosie O'Donnell, Martha Wash, and more.

On 13 November 2018, Michelle Obama previewed her newest book, Becoming, in an interview with Warner on the show. The Chicago interview took place the same day her national book tour kicked off at the United Center with Oprah.

== Production ==
The show was filmed in front of a live audience weekdays at 1 p.m. CDT based at ABC7 Studios in the Chicago Loop. The running time is between 40–45 minutes per episode. Matt Knutson has been the executive producer since 2015.

The Windy City Live set was once home of The Oprah Winfrey Show until 1988, before it moved to Harpo Studios in West Loop, Chicago. Following the end of Oprah in 2011, Windy City Live initially replaced the 9 a.m. CDT time slot in Chicago on WLS-TV.

== Reception ==
In its tenth season, Windy City Live's early ratings peaked at viewership of over 105,000 Chicago households per episode. Viewership remained steady with strong ratings among women 25 to 54.

In 2016, Windy City Live won a Chicago/Midwest Emmy in the program category of best interview/discussion. The following year, Ryan Chiaverini won a Chicago/Midwest Emmy award for best Program Host/Moderator in his role on the series. It is the talk show's fifth Emmy award overall.
