= John Drury (television anchor) =

American journalist (1927–2007)

- Drury at WLS-TV c. 1977.
- Born: John Richard Drury; January 4, 1927; Peoria, Illinois, U.S.
- Died: November 25, 2007 (aged 80); Wheaton, Illinois, U.S.
- Education: West Aurora High School
- Occupations: News Anchor at WBBM-TV (1962–67); WGN-TV (1967–70; 1979–84); WLS-TV (1970–79; 1984–2002)
- Years active: 1954–2002
- Spouses: Marjorie Foulk (m. 1953–1987) Ann Guercio (m. 1990–2007)
- Children: 4

John Richard Drury (January 4, 1927 – November 25, 2007) was an American television news anchor from Chicago, Illinois. Drury is most known for serving as anchor on Chicago news broadcasts which included: WGN-TV from 1967 to 1970 and again from 1979 until 1984; WLS-TV from 1970 to 1979 and 1984 until his retirement in 2002. Upon his retirement came the news that he was diagnosed with amyotrophic lateral sclerosis, otherwise known as Lou Gehrig's disease. Drury was a leading activist for ALS research and was a spokesperson for the Brain Research Foundation. Drury died from motor neurone disease in 2007 at age 80.

== Career ==
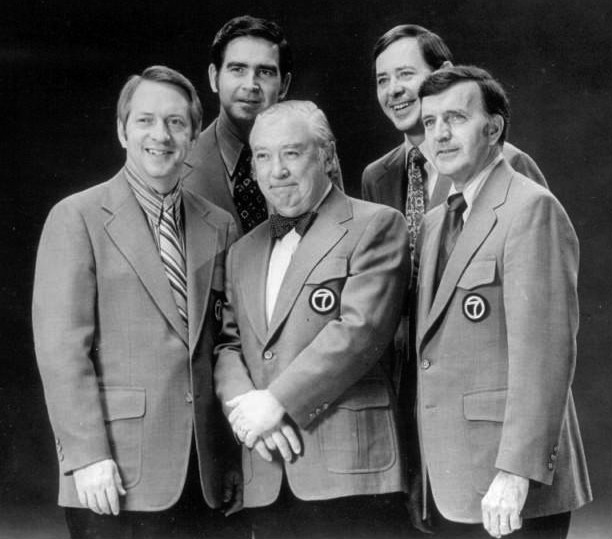
Eyewitness News team, 1972. Back, from left: anchor John Drury, anchor Joel Daly. Front, from left: weatherman John Coleman, anchor Fahey Flynn, sportscaster Bill Frink.

In 1947, Drury's broadcasting career began at WMRO-RADIO (now WBIG-RADIO) in Aurora Illinois. His Television career began in 1955 at WTMJ-TV in Milwaukee. He anchored and reported on the 10 p.m. news until leaving in 1962. He then joined WBBM-TV. He both anchored and reported news for them until 1967. During this time, he served as Fahey Flynn's first co-anchor. Following his stint at WBBM-TV, Drury joined WGN-TV, where he served as the 10 p.m. news anchor until 1970. He then switched over to WLS-TV for his first stint on the ABC-owned station. He anchored their news until 1979 before going back to WGN-TV to be their anchorman again. Drury stayed at WGN until 1984 during which he won numerous awards such as the Chicago Father of the Year and also a Chicago Emmy awards for Individual Excellence in 1983. In August 1984, he rejoined WLS and took over the anchorman job for their 10 p.m. newscasts. He won two more Chicago Emmy awards for Individual Excellence in 1987 and 1988. Drury retired in 2002 after 40 years in the business. Drury won one more Chicago Emmy in 2003 for his news report, "9/11/02 The New Homeland."

== Awards ==
- Chicago Journalism Hall of Fame Induction – 1996
- Chicago Emmy Award for Individual Excellence – 1983, 1987, 1988 and 2003
- Illinois Journalist of the Year – 2002
- Chicago Press Veteran of the Year – 2002
- Chicago Father of the Year – 1983
- Better Government Association's Distinguished Journalism Award – 1989
- Silver Circle Award – 1996
- John Drury Day – February 27, 2002 (in Chicago, Illinois: Mayor Richard M. Daley)

Conversely, the John Drury High School Radio Awards are named after him.

== Personal life ==
Drury was married to his wife Marjorie from 1953 until her death in 1987. They had four children: Logan, James, Richard, and Susan. Drury married Ann Guercio in 1988; they were married until his death in 2007.

Drury lived mostly in Glen Ellyn, Illinois, but later moved to Wheaton, Illinois when he remarried. He died November 25, 2007, at his home in Wheaton.
