= Ryan Chiaverini =

Television personality

- Born: October 12, 1977 (age 48)
- Education: University of Colorado Boulder
- Occupations: Television personality, Sports anchor
- Years active: 2000s–present
- Known for: Co-host of Windy City Live (now Windy City Weekend); Lead Sports Anchor at ABC7 Chicago

Ryan Chiaverini (born October 12, 1977) is an American television personality, and Midwest Emmy Award winning co-host of Windy City Live (now Windy City Weekend) on ABC Chicago (WLS-TV). He is also the Lead Sports Anchor at ABC7 Chicago replacing Jim Rose who retired in September 2023.

== Early life and education ==
Chiaverini is from Corona, California. His father, Eddie Chiaverini, is a professional guitarist and singer who was a member of the surf band The Lively Ones. Their most popular song, “Surf Rider” is featured in the 1994 film “Pulp Fiction” earning the band a platinum album. Ryan has four half-brothers and is the twin brother of former NFL receiver Darrin Chiaverini (Ryan is 8 minutes older). They both attended the University of Colorado Boulder. Ryan was a “walk on” for the football team eventually earning a full athletic scholarship. Ryan earned a degree in broadcast journalism and has had a successful career in sports journalism and television hosting. Darrin was drafted by the Cleveland Browns (5th round) in 1999. He holds the Browns franchise record for catches in a single game by a rookie (11). He went onto play 4 seasons in the NFL (Browns/Cowboys/Falcons) and played professionally in the AFL for several years before becoming a college football coach.

== Career ==
Chiaverini began his career as a weekend sports anchor at KFBB in Great Falls, Montana, then at KTVQ in Billings. In 2002, he became a sports reporter at KUSA in Denver, Colorado. He spent four seasons covering the Denver Broncos and served as a fill-in host for the Mike Shanahan Show and John Elway's Crush Zone. In 2006, he moved to WLS-TV, where he was promoted to sports anchor for the weekend news broadcasts and hosted the station's pre-game coverage of the Chicago Bears, the Chicago Huddle.

In 2011, WLS-TV launched a 9:00 am weekday talk show with the working title ”Morning Rush” to replace the iconic and coveted Oprah Winfrey Show. After several rounds and months of auditions, Chiaverini was named co-host alongside Val Warner; more than 500 people had applied. Ryan is credited with naming the show Windy City Live.

In September 2021, after a successful 10 year daily run Windy City Live became a weekly program, Windy City Weekend; starting in 2022, Chiaverini also became a fill-in weekday sports anchor on ABC 7.

In November 2023, Chiaverini was promoted to ABC 7 Lead Sports Anchor. He currently anchors sports on ABC 7's top rated newscasts weekdays at 5pm, 6pm and 10 p.m.

== Acting ==
In 2021, Chiaverini played a lawyer in the Lifetime TV movie Switched Before Birth. He has also had small roles on Showtime’s Shameless & ABC’s General Hospital along with other TV series and independent films.

== Awards ==
In 2013, Chiaverini shared the Chicago/Midwest regional Emmy Award for Program Host/Moderator; he won the award outright in 2017. Also in 2013, he shared in the regional Emmy for Interview/Discussion Programming awarded to Windy City Live for a special on violence, and in 2020-2023 he was one of the recipients of the Chicago/Midwest regional Emmy for Special Event Coverage, for ABC7’s popular New Years Eve show Countdown Chicago.

== Personal life ==
In 2011, New City named Chiaverini "best-looking male local TV personality", and in 2012, Modern Luxury magazine named him among Chicago's most eligible bachelors.

Chiaverini is a hobby singer/guitarist. Having lost his younger brother to suicide, in 2014 he wrote and recorded a song called "Chicago" to benefit the American Foundation for Suicide Prevention. In 2019, after his mother's death from cancer, he released "This Is Country" with a link for donations to cancer research. He has also performed at a media charity event known as "Newsapalooza", in 2008 with Richard Marx

He has continued to work for suicide awareness and cancer research, speaking at the annual Out of the Darkness Walk and emceeing cancer fundraising events.
