= Diann Burns =

American journalist

- Born: September 29, 1958 (age 67); Cleveland, Ohio
- Occupation: Journalist
- Years active: 1981–2008
- Children: 1 son

Diann Burns (born September 29, 1958, in Cleveland, Ohio) is a former television news anchor and a nine-time Emmy Award-winner. She is best known for her years as a prime-time weekday anchor for two Chicago television stations. Burns appeared in several major movies and at least one television dramatic series. She was the first African-American woman to anchor the prime-time news in Chicago. She entered the Chicago TV market as a reporter after a successful career as newspaper journalist. She earned an advanced degree in journalism at Columbia University in New York.

== Biography ==
=== Education ===
Burns earned an undergraduate degree in politics and mass communications from Cleveland State University and a master's degree from Columbia University Graduate School of Journalism in New York City.

=== Career ===
Burns began her career as a print journalist in Cleveland Ohio for The Plain Dealer in the late 1970s until 1980. At that time, she moved to New York and completed her master's degree in journalism at Columbia University in 1981. From 1981 until 1983, she was at WPIX. In 1983, she joined NBC-affiliated WCMH television as a general assignment reporter, where she was named news anchor in 1984.

From 1985 until 2003, she was the 5pm and 10pm weekday news anchor at American Broadcasting Company (ABC) owned and operated WLS-TV Chicago, where she was Chicago's highest-paid television news professional before joining WBBM-TV in 2003 as the weekday 5pm, 6pm and 10pm news anchor, until leaving WBBM in 2008. WBBM is owned and operated by CBS (CBS Worldwide, Inc.). ABC is a division of The Walt Disney Company's Disney-ABC Television Group.

=== Most dangerous live reports ===
1. War-torn Somalia, where she was not embedded with U.S. troops, but on her own.
2. Reporting live just outside a mobile home rigged with enough explosives to destroy an entire neighborhood in Glenview, Cook County, Illinois — the bomb was part of a booby-trap left for rescuers and police responding to the body in a suicide.

=== Most Notable on-camera moments ===
1. With Nelson Mandela during his first United States tour after his release after 27 years as a political prisoner under apartheid in South Africa.
2. Questioning the man just arrested for (and later convicted of) murdering Michael Jordan's father.

=== Career timeline ===
- 1974-79: Cleveland State University, Cleveland, Ohio
- 1979–80: The Plain Dealer (newspaper), Cleveland, Ohio
- 1980-81: Columbia University Graduate School of Journalism, New York, NY
- 1981-84: WPIX Television, New York City, NY
- 1984-85: WCMH Television, Columbus, Ohio
- 1985–2003: WLS Television, Chicago, Illinois
- 2003-08: WBBM Television, Chicago, Illinois
- 2008-2011: Next TV, Chicago Urban League, Chicago, Illinois
- 2011–present: Diann Burns Media, Los Angeles, California

=== Awards ===
Among Burns's many awards are nine Emmys, one national and eight regional.

=== Volunteer work and philanthropy ===
Burns is the spokesperson for Pediatric Aids Chicago. She also works with Girls in the Game.

Burns is active with the Ronald McDonald House, the Northern Illinois Chapter of the Multiple Sclerosis Society, and The Support Group, an organization that assists high school students with school work and home life by providing tutoring and social services.

=== Family ===
Until recently, Burns and her now teen-aged son resided in Chicago's Lincoln Park.

== Film credits ==
Burns appeared in several major motion pictures, playing herself, including:

- Richie Rich (1994)
- Primal Fear (1996)
- The Negotiator (1998)

== Televisions credits ==
Burns is known to have appeared in at least one television dramatic role as someone other than herself:

- Boss - 2011, episode 5, starring Kelsey Grammer, on Starz.
