= Television News Inc. =

1970s television newsfilm service

- Type: Joint venture
- Founded: May 14, 1973; 53 years ago
- Defunct: October 31, 1975
- Products: Syndicated news and film for television stations
- Owner: Coors Brewing Company (90%); Visnews (10%)

Television News Inc. (TVN) was an American syndicated news service, providing daily feeds of newsfilm to subscribing television stations in the United States and Canada between 1973 and 1975. Majority-owned by the Coors Brewing Company of Golden, Colorado, TVN was among the first services of its kind to cater to the growing number of independent stations producing newscasts. However, it lost millions of dollars throughout its run, being unable to carry out a proposed shift to satellite distribution that would have made it a pioneer in the field, and it also came under fire for being positioned by owner and financial backer Joseph Coors as a conservative alternative to the three major networks (ABC, CBS, and NBC), whose news output he deemed "liberal". Coors's ownership of TVN and refusal to step down from the post was instrumental in the United States Senate's rejection of his nomination to the board of the Corporation for Public Broadcasting (CPB) in 1975.

== Founding ==
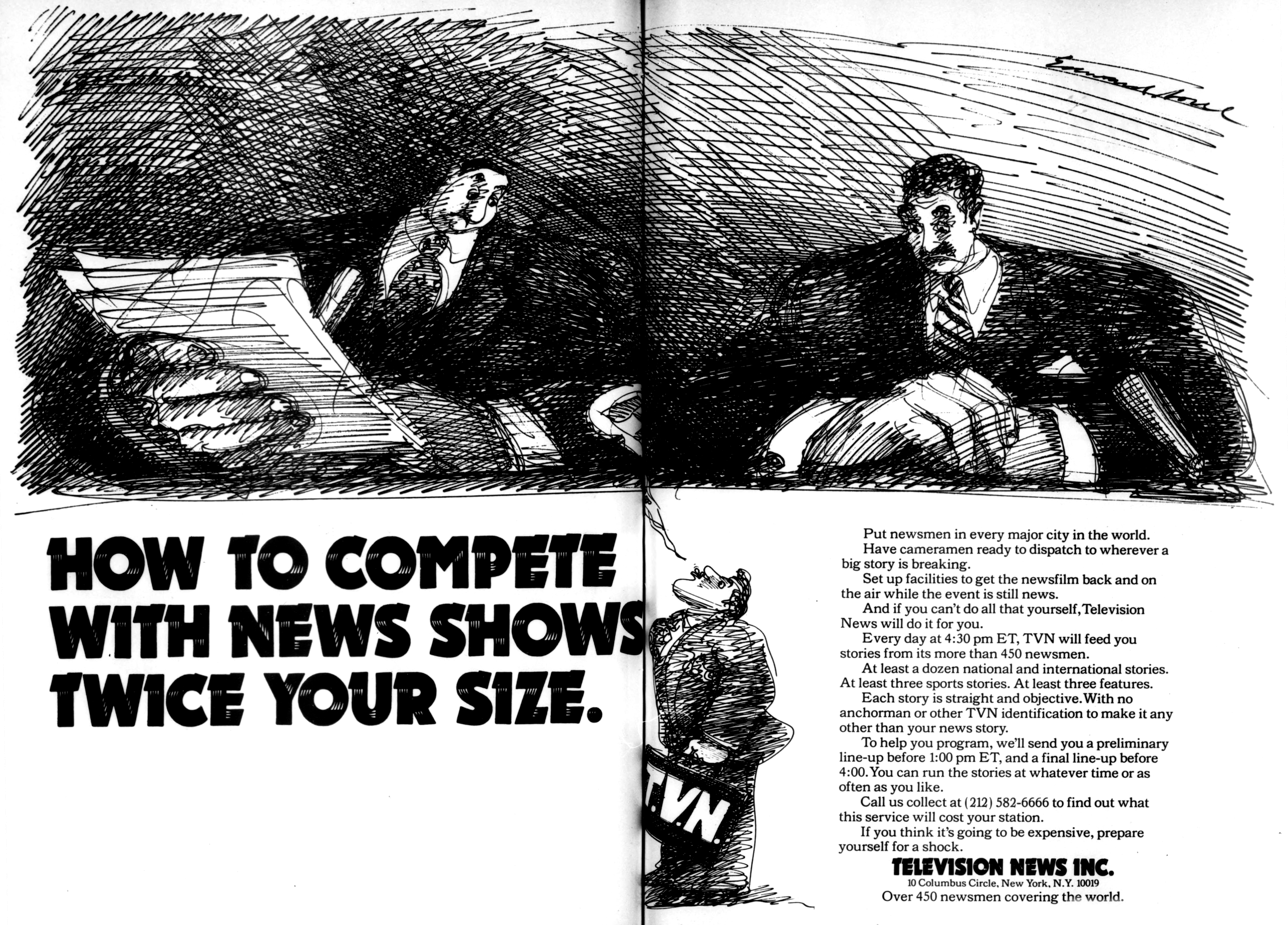
Two-page spread advertisement for TVN in Radio Age magazine, 1973

The launch of TVN was announced in February 1973, with Robert Pauley as its chief executive and $4 million in initial capital, most from Coors. Pauley had pitched the idea to Joseph Coors, one of the brothers who owned the Coors enterprises; until that time, most non-network sources of newsfilm sent it by air express mail to clients, while Pauley proposed a much more expensive system in the model of major networks. This concept was not new to Pauley: after the United Network failed in late 1967, Pauley was briefly retained to relaunch that network as a news and public affairs supplier then pitched a television news service of his own the next year.

The first customer was Miami's WCIX-TV, which was in the middle of expanding its local news service; the check from the Miami station was framed at the network's offices. At launch, TVN maintained bureaus at its headquarters in New York City, where the company had offices on the 21st floor of a Manhattan skyscraper, as well as in Los Angeles, Chicago, and Washington, D.C.

TVN service began May 14, 1973, with a two-week trial taken by 32 stations. In addition to WCIX, KTVU in San Francisco had signed up at launch. What set TVN apart from its competitors—the major networks—was that it was able to offer all of its newsfilm to subscribers. Frequently, networks held back the best segments of footage for their own newscasts, leaving local stations with less valuable material for their own programs. TVN, however, did not have such limitations, and it also offered material from London-based Visnews, a minority stockholder in the firm. Two Los Angeles stations took the trial and gave glowing remarks to the service, with Stan Chambers of KTLA calling it "excellent" and "the great logical idea whose time is finally here". At the end of the trial period, TVN won accounts from Chicago's WGN-TV and Metromedia's four stations, a significant step toward viability. The company had signed up 26 stations by April 1974, with further major-market independents including WOR-TV in New York as well as network affiliates such as KYW-TV in Philadelphia, KSD-TV in St. Louis, and WBTV in Charlotte. That same year, it bought out the United States business of United Press International Television News, a competing film service owned by United Press International and ITN, eliminating its only competition in the field of non-network newsfilm syndicators.

In January 1975, TVN disclosed plans to shift from distributing news film through AT&T long lines and use the Westar satellite system for delivery, partly in response to a rate increase for "occasional" land line users such as TVN; Jack G. Wilson, the president of the company, described the move as being its financial salvation. One reason was that switching costs to hook up independents and network affiliates to the AT&T lines often exceeded what the company charged its newsfilm customers. This was a bleeding-edge proposal for its time and would have been the first full-time use of a U.S. satellite for television program distribution. $11 million was to be set aside for the construction of earth stations at affiliates across the country, as many as 35 within seven months, and subscribers such as WCIX considered the installation of these facilities with the possibility of receiving additional non-network programs as more groups switched to satellite broadcasting. By this time, it had 37 subscribers in the United States and another 36 in Canada; the Canadian stations, mostly affiliates of the Canadian Broadcasting Corporation (CBC), could not use the satellite distribution. Notably, as the service was not exclusive in a given market, there were multiple cities where more than one station took TVN's service. In Los Angeles, five stations (KHJ-TV, KMEX, KNXT, KTLA, and KTTV) were its customers; there were three in New York and four in Toronto, including the CBC (a part-owner of Visnews), CFTO-TV, and the Global Television Network.

== Conservative slant ==
[We] got into it because of our strong belief that network news is slanted to the liberal left side of the spectrum and does not give an objective view to the American public.

— Joseph Coors, to a reporter for the Rocky Mountain News in August 1974

The Coors family and particularly Joseph Coors had a reputation for conservatism, and in the 1970s, Coors provided significant seed money for new national conservative organizations, such as The Heritage Foundation.

Even in the first month of TVN's life, editorial direction proved an issue. Even though Dick Graf, a former WNBC news director, reportedly got Coors's backing for "down the middle" news coverage, on June 4, 1973, the board of directors declared that its policy "requires a more balanced presentation of the news than the service has thus far exhibited". An assistant to Coors, Jack G. Wilson, who had worked in local TV news in Rockford, Illinois and Denver before joining the company and was a Heritage Foundation trustee, was named assistant and made many story suggestions and comments, including one in which he described Martin Luther King Jr. as "an avowed communist revolutionary". Graf resigned after Wilson, against his orders, hired a camera crew and reported on a bribery scandal in the West German government; he stayed on for a short time as a "marked man". Meanwhile, Wilson continued to criticize TVN's coverage as consistently too far to the left, asking "What in the world are we doing giving a platform to American Indian Movement revolutionaries"; Graf told others that he was asked by Coors, "Why are you covering Daniel Ellsberg? He's a traitor to his country". Ultimately, Graf was fired in February 1974 while on vacation, putting Wilson in control; he was then appointed president that June.

They hired professional newspeople to get the operation going. But Coors never wanted a news organization. His people wanted a propaganda machine. Wilson understood the rules of the game from the beginning. We didn't.

— Pete Simmons, northeast bureau chief for TVN, who resigned in April 1974

Under Wilson, conservative editorial bias became more of an issue. Leadership turned over in the Washington bureau, where some staffers felt that founding Heritage Foundation president Paul Weyrich exercised influence and even wrote questions at a news conference. While stories were not slanted, often story selection was: at one time, reporter Carolyn Lewis did a story with Ralph Nader only to be told that TVN did not want him on its air. In September 1974, Wilson made major cutbacks at the service, which left just two reporters and two staff cameramen in the Midwest and West and made TVN even more reliant on stringers and stories from its affiliated stations; he also fired the then-news director, Tom Turley.

At the start of 1975, a new employee joined TVN, a former television adviser to Richard Nixon and the president of his own television consulting firm: Roger Ailes, who became the vice president for news operations. Under Ailes, the company won a contract with the United States Information Agency to supply news clips and scripts for government use through a separate division of the company. Ailes resigned in September, citing "administrative disagreements" with management.

== CPB nomination, scrutiny, and closing ==
In one of his last acts before resigning, on August 8, 1974, Nixon nominated Joseph Coors for consideration by the United States Senate to be named to the board of the Corporation for Public Broadcasting. The nomination was renewed by Gerald R. Ford after he became president.

The March/April 1975 issue of the Columbia Journalism Review carried as its cover story a feature by Stanhope Gould entitled "Coors Brews the News". The piece expressed concern over pressures exerted by Wilson and the subtle "nudging" of the service to, per Wilson's words as quoted by Tom Turley, "put our philosophy in the news: gradually, subtly, slowly". Further attention was attracted when one part of a multi-part front page story reported that May by The Washington Post staff writer Stephen Isaacs profiled TVN and its issues, as well as Coors's attitudes toward public broadcasting; it also disclosed a letter written by Coors to CPB chair Henry Loomis in January 1975 expressing disdain for a public television documentary he felt "wrongly" attacked the funeral industry and noting his interest in "watching closely" such activity. The Coors reputation for conservatism dissuaded at least one station, WRC-TV in Washington, from signing up, though that city's WTTG and WTOP-TV were subscribers and generally found its content useful.

That September, nomination hearings began for Coors, scheduled for two days instead of the matter of hours contemplated for other CPB nominees. Another letter to Loomis, asking the CPB to hold off on expenditures for satellite interconnects of public television stations and suggesting it contract with a commercial firm for a system similar to that TVN was considering for its own distribution, also figured prominently. On the second day, Senator John O. Pastore, presiding over the hearing, asked Coors if he would commit to stepping down from his role at TVN if confirmed to the CPB board; Coors refused, citing his fiduciary duty to Coors stockholders. He briefly, however, agreed to consider resigning. He also admitted to being a contributor to and generally agreeing with the views of the John Birch Society. During the hearing, Pastore told Coors, "No nomination which has come before this subcommittee has bothered me more than yours."

On September 29, TVN announced it would cease operating on October 31, citing a continuing "lack of revenues" for exiting the business and a lack of interest in a conversion to satellite distribution; the TVN Enterprises film production unit would remain in operation. At the time, it was estimated that TVN lost $50,000 a month, in part due to low rates offered to entice stations to join. However, prior loss figures provided by Coors were significantly higher. When the brewing company filed a prospectus in May 1975 ahead of an initial public offering, it stated that it had lost $2.2 million on TVN in 1973 and $3.2 million in 1974, with another $3 million in losses projected for the third year of the business.

The same day TVN closed, by an 11–6 vote, the Senate Commerce Committee rejected the Coors nomination, in large part because he refused to resign.

== Legacy ==
TVN's legacy has occasionally been revisited, particularly its connection with Ailes in light of later projects such as Fox News Channel. In 2008, Kerwin Swint wrote a book, Dark Genius: The Influential Career of Legendary Political Operative and Fox News Founder Roger Ailes, which, per an article in Slate by Jack Shafer, "[labored] to establish TVN as the ideological progenitor of Fox News". In later years, Ailes described himself as a mere "consultant" to TVN, though he had previously noted he could hire and fire personnel.

Joining TVN upon its 1974 purchase of UPITN was Reese Schonfeld, later a co-founder of CNN, who proposed the satellite distribution plan while there but spent what a 1980 profile in Broadcasting magazine called an "unhappy year" with the company before being fired in June 1975. After TVN folded, in response to stations wanting a service of this type to continue because it had helped increase the ratings for their newscasts, he started the Independent Television News Association (ITNA), a cooperative based at WPIX in New York City, which used Westar to feed news to seven charter subscribers. Another employee with a long career in television management was Dennis Swanson, who would work for all of the Big Four networks including as president of ABC Sports.

The service's coverage of the Watergate hearings was helmed by Charles Gibson, who earned the attention of Sam Donaldson at ABC News; in 1975, Gibson was hired by that network as a Washington correspondent, later rising to host Good Morning America and World News.
