= Ned O'Gorman =

American poet

- Born: Edward Charles O'Gorman; September 26, 1929; New York City
- Died: March 7, 2014 (aged 84); New York City
- Education: Columbia University; Princeton University
- Occupations: Poet, educator
- Parent(s): Samuel Franklin Engs O'Gorman; Annette de Bouthillier-Chavigny
- Relatives: Reese Schonfeld (brother-in-law)

Edward Charles "Ned" O'Gorman (September 26, 1929 – March 7, 2014) was an American poet and educator.

== Biography ==
=== Early life ===
Edward Charles O'Gorman was born on September 26, 1929, in New York City. His father was Samuel Franklin Engs O'Gorman and his mother, Annette de Bouthillier-Chavigny, a French aristocrat. He spent most of his early life in Southport, Connecticut, and Bradford, Vermont. In 1950, he graduated from St. Michael's College in Vermont and later received an M.A. from Columbia University, where he studied with poet and scholar Mark Van Doren. While at Princeton University in 1957, he rented a room in the house of novelist Caroline Gordon Tate, former (and future) wife of poet Allen Tate. O'Gorman would later research (but never complete) a biography of Allen Tate. His sister Pat O'Gorman Schonfeld was married to CNN executive Reese Schonfeld.

=== Career ===
His poetry earned him Guggenheim Fellowships in 1956 and 1962. He won the Lamont Poetry Prize in 1958 for his first collection of poems, The Night of the Hammer.

From 1957 to 1960 O'Gorman taught at Iona College in New Rochelle, New York. He taught at Tougaloo College in Mississippi in 1965 and 1966. He later taught at Brooklyn College, The New School, and Manhattan College.

He was the literary editor of the Catholic magazine Jubilee from 1962 to 1965. He was appointed by the U.S. State Department to be the American studies specialist in Chile, Argentina and Brazil in 1965. In 1968, he signed the "Writers and Editors War Tax Protest" pledge, vowing to refuse tax payments in protest against the Vietnam War. In connection with the peace movement, O'Gorman organized a poetry reading, called "Poets for Peace," at the Town Hall in New York City on November 12, 1967, for the Compassionate Arts of the Fellowship of Reconciliation. The reading was recorded and published on a spoken word vinyl LP featuring recitations by Robert Lowell, Barbara Howes, Richard Eberhart, Louise Bogan, Richard Wilbur, Abbie Huston Evans, Galway Kinnell, Daniel Berrigan, Bink Noll, Stanley Kunitz, Arthur Miller, W. D. Snodgrass, and others. O'Gorman later received the Rothko Chapel Award for Commitment to Truth and Freedom.

In July 1966, he arrived in Harlem and worked that summer as a volunteer teacher in a Head Start program. The children's library he started two months later, named after Addie Mae Collins, one of the four children killed in the 1963 bombing of a Birmingham church, gradually became a tuition-free school known as The Children's Storefront, welcoming all children living in the area. Today, the school thrives with an annual budget of $2.5 million and a waiting list of eight hundred children.

After losing a dispute over succession at the Storefront, O'Gorman founded the Ricardo O'Gorman Garden and Center for Resources in the Humanities which opened in 1998 with the collaboration of two teachers from the original school. The center, which O'Gorman continued to direct, is located on West 129th Street in New York City. The tuition-free school ran an annual budget of $300,000 and for many years benefitted from O'Gorman's fund-raising efforts.

O'Gorman wrote six books of poetry, five books of prose, and numerous articles and poetry published in various magazines.

His many correspondents included some of the most renowned cultural figures of the mid twentieth century: Peter Levi, Henry Miller, Huston Smith, Susan Sontag, Mark Van Doren, Daniel Berrigan, Louise Bogan, Gwendolyn Brooks, Richard Eberhart, Paul Goodman, Suzanne Hiltermann, Galway Kinnell, Denise Levertov, Archibald MacLeish, Marianne Moore, Anaïs Nin, Richard Wilbur, Robert Bly, Rafael Squirru, Bink Noll, Laura Riding Jackson, Lincoln Kirstein, Kathleen Raine, Robert Penn Warren, Dorothy Day, and Thomas Merton.

=== Death ===
He died of pancreatic cancer at his Manhattan home on March 7, 2014, at the age of eighty-four.

== Bibliography ==
=== Poetry ===
- The Night of the Hammer (Harcourt, Brace 1958)
- Adam Before the Mirror (Harcourt, Brace 1961)
- The Buzzard and the Peacock (Harcourt, Brace and World 1964)
- The Harvesters' Vase (Harcourt, Brace 1968)
- The Flag the Hawk Flies (Alfred A. Knopf 1972)
- How to Put Out a Fire (Eakins Press 1984)
- Five Seasons of Obsession: New and Selected Poems (Helen Marx Books 2001)

=== Non-fiction ===
- Prophetic Voices: Ideas and Words on Revolution (Random House 1969)
- The Storefront: A Community of Children on 129th Street and Madison Avenue (Harper & Row 1970)
- The Wilderness and the Laurel Tree: A Guide for Teachers and Parents on the Observation of Children (Harper & Row 1972)
- The Children Are Dying (New American Library 1978)
- The other side of loneliness (Arcade Publishing 2006)

=== Children's books ===
- The Blue Butterfly (with pictures by Thomas di Grazia) (Harper & Row 1971)

=== Anthologies ===
- A Reading of New Poems: Garrett, O'Gorman, Creagh, Bagg, O Criadain, O'Grady (American Academy in Rome 1959)
- Perfected Steel, Terrible Crystal: An Unconventional Source Book of Spiritual Readings in Poetry and Prose, Ned O'Gorman, Editor (Seabury Press 1981)

=== Pamphlets ===
- A Practical Guide for Parents, Teachers, and Other Friends of Children (Claretian Publications 1970)

=== Books about Ned O'Gorman ===
- Elizabeth Howard, Editor, Ned O'Gorman: A Glance Back (lulu.com 2016)
