= United Press International Radio Network =

Former radio news service

Originally named "UPI Audio," the United Press International Radio Network was a news service for radio and television stations from wire service United Press International. It was the first such service offered by a major news agency and existed from 1958 to 1999.

A late 1950s offshoot of UPI's television footage service, "UPI Movietone," later known as United Press International Television News or UPITN, "UPI Audio," began selling the sounds of newsmakers stripped from newsfilm, plus the voices of UPI reporters and stringers to client radio stations.

It was originally done on a piecemeal basis, with UPI's wire for broadcasters, known as the National Radio Wire, carrying lists of available material. Over time, that list came to be called a billboard, and it moved several times a day. As the operation grew, it was expanded from dial-up telephone to feeds by leased line, the audio material, now branded as Audio Roundup was fed at specific times, usually at ten minutes past the hour.

In early 1966, UPI acquired the assets and key personnel of a similarly named (but previously unrelated) competing service, Radio Press International. Out of that merger came an audio service that at its peak served more than a thousand U.S. radio stations and many foreign clients, including other networks such as NPR, RKO, Britain's Independent Radio News and even CNN in its early years when CNN, then headed by former UPI and UPTN executives Reese Schonfeld and Burt Reinhardt, effectively reunited UPI audio with UPITN video.

In the early 1970s, UPI Audio began offering a newscast at the top of the hour.

Soon thereafter, it added live sportscasts and business reports. Among UPI Audio's sportscasters of the late 1970s were Keith Olbermann and Sam Rosen.

Unlike most commercial radio networks, which usually paid local stations to air their programming (and commercials), UPI charged stations cash for its broadcast services, allowing them to sell their own advertising within or adjacent to UPI broadcasts. It is the model that then-rival wire service Associated Press also used when it followed UPI into the radio network field in the mid-1970s.

The service name was changed from UPI Audio to UPI Radio Network in 1983 to reflect the greater focus on live programming.

After a long period of changing ownerships, business models and bankruptcies, UPI declined into a shell of a news service by 1999, when its then-Saudi Arabian ownership was convinced by its handpicked CEO, Arnaud de Borchgrave, to exit the broadcasting business United Press had pioneered back in the 1930s. The rump UPI sold its client list of its radio network and broadcast wire to its former rival, the AP.
