= UPI Newstime =

American cable television network

UPI Newstime was a cable television network founded by United Press International in 1978, and premiered on July 3 of that year. UPI Newstime was the second 24-hour all-news television network in the US for cable TV, following AP Newscable for 13 years and predating CNN by 2 years. UPI Newstime was unique in how it distributed its programming to local cable TV (CATV) headends via satellite, using a form of slow-scan television, or SSTV technology. Using SSTV reduced satellite transmission costs for UPI and was suitable at the time for the programming produced by UPI for the channel, which mainly relied on still slides and wirephotos acquired by UPI's own newsgathering operations.

UPI Newstime's newscasts were broadcast interruption-free in 15-minute blocks. On normal news days, an entirely new news segment was produced six times, sports four times, and business, finance, and weather three times daily. It consisted of black & white still images & alphanumeric texts displayed in a slideshow fashion with each new slide building from the left to right of the screen, each taking 8.5 seconds to be shown on the air. The audio accompanying and annotating the stills was produced by UPI in a radio newscast style for each Newstime broadcast from the studio and remote audio feeds provided by UPI Audio. The programming was produced initially by Newstime's studios in regular NTSC video format, with each 15-minute newscast being edited and mastered to U-Matic-format 3/4" videotape. The video from the tape was then converted into an audio-compatible narrow-bandwidth 8 kHz-wide black & white SSTV signal, using special narrowband SSTV video equipment designed & manufactured by Colorado Video, Inc. (CVI). From there, it was then uplinked via satellite (through the facilities of Satellite Syndicated Systems, Inc. (SSS)) on two audio subcarriers, both "piggybacked" on the satellite transponder carrying Superstation WTCG (now TBS) at the time (who also utilized SSS' satellite facilities); one for the SSTV-encoded video, and another for Newstime's program audio (along with WTCG's audio subcarrier and main video carrier on the transponder). From there, cable TV systems would receive, from the satellite's downlink, Newstime's SSTV video & audio signals from these subcarriers. The SSTV feed would then be converted using a SSTV decoder, also supplied by CVI, back into a conventional black & white RS-170-standard NTSC video channel with audio to be distributed on a cable TV system's channel.

UPI considered discontinuing Newstime sometime around 1981, after competing news networks like CNN which utilized regular full-motion color NTSC video like traditional TV channels, started to take away Newstime's viewership and thus made its operations less economically viable. UPI planned to discontinue Newstime and offer their existing text-based "Cable Newswire" service as a substitute for the CATV systems that carried Newstime. But UPI decided instead to hand over operations of Newstime on April 30, 1981 to an Atlanta-based television & radio production company, Eastern Broadcast Services (EBS), with the intention of EBS continuing the Newstime service.

Shortly after EBS took over UPI Newstime in 1981, they merged the channel with another similar SSTV-transmitted cable TV network founded by Southern Satellite Systems (the corporate parent of Satellite Syndicated Systems, the uplink provider for UPI Newstime as mentioned earlier), called The Women's Channel. Unlike UPI Newstime, The Women's Channel transmitted their stills in color, although in the same technical fashion as UPI Newstime (albeit using a wider 10-kHz subcarrier for their color SSTV feed), featuring content adapted from partnering publications such as Family Circle magazine. The merged operation was then renamed North American Newstime. The channel was later renamed North American Travel after the network added travel information to its news and information lineup.
