= APTV =

APTV is an abbreviation with multiple meanings, including

- Associated Press Television News
- American Public Television, also abbreviated APT
- Aptiv, the auto parts company, based on its ticker symbol.
