= Ramon Guthrie =

American poet & novelist (1896–1973)

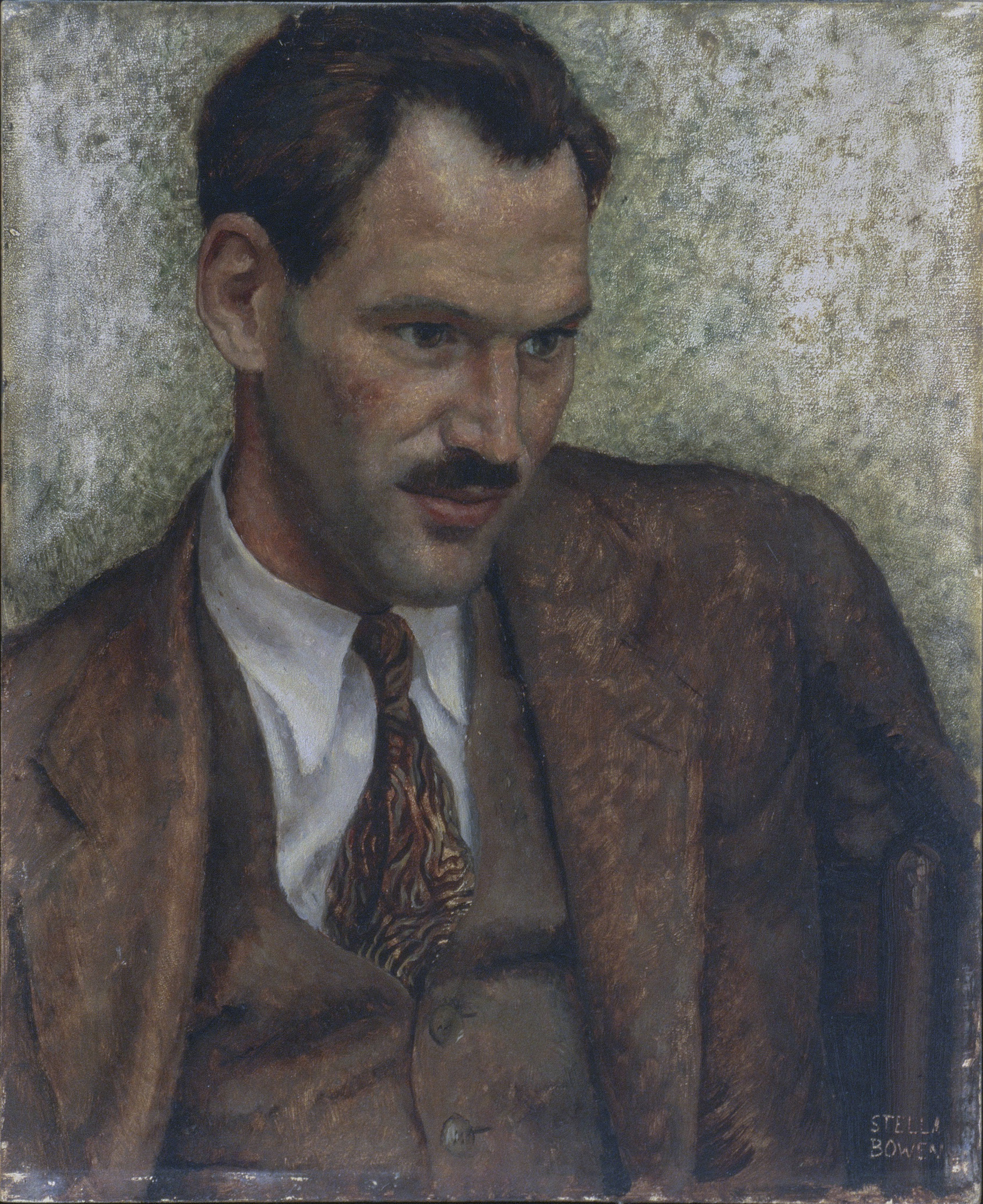
Ramon Guthrie, portrayed by Stella Bowen in 1928. Hood Museum of Art

Ramon Guthrie (January 14, 1896 – November 22, 1973) was a poet, novelist, essayist, critic, painter and professor of French and comparative literature. He published five collections of poetry, and two novels, translated three volumes of French nonfiction, edited two standard anthologies of French literature and published numerous reviews, essays and individual poems.

== Introduction ==
His reputation among his contemporaries, many with extraordinary reputations of their own, is demonstrated by the festschrift honoring him upon his retirement from teaching. That volume, Ramon Guthrie Kaleidoscope, contains contributions by the poets: Dilys Laing, Lou B. ("Bink") Noll, Phillip Booth and Tristan Tzara; the critics, Malcolm Cowley, M. L. Rosenthal and Irita Bradford Van Doren; the artists, Stella Bowen, Alexander Calder, Peter Blume and Ray Nash and the journalist, George Seldes plus some two dozen other contributors. However, even though Germaine Bree wrote of his penultimate collection, Asbestos Phoenix, that "[It] alone would place Ramon Guthrie among the major poets of the mid-century," and his masterpiece, Maximum Security Ward would be greeted in 1970 with critical acclaim and would receive the Marjorie Peabody Waite award, Guthrie and his masterpiece were neglected. Malcolm Cowley, a major critic of Guthrie's generation, writing 10 years after the publication of Maximum Security Ward, stated of Guthrie and of MSW's reception: "Among the talented writers I have known, the most curiously neglected is the poet and scholar Ramon Guthrie. He started out with the famous writers of the World War I generation, Hemingway, Faulkner, Fitzgerald, and others, some of whom were his good friends. His best writing was on a level with theirs.") Another major critic of the 20th century, M. L. Rosenthal, chose Maximum Security Ward and Other Poems to be the first volume in Persea Book's Lamplighter Series of significant modern poets because he felt that Guthrie had been neglected and ought to remain in print. Rosenthal said of Guthrie that he had been ignored "For no good reason, really -- only the familiar general indifference to the real thing and identification of publicity with reputation."

Guthrie was in the middle of the literary ferment following World War I (Ford Madox Ford and Siegfried Sassoon invited him to come to England) and of expatriate Paris in the 1920s. where he was conversant with James Joyce and Gertrude Stein could stop by Edith Sitwell’s salon and spend an afternoon with Ezra Pound in the Tuileries during which "all Pound talked about was bassoons." In the summer of 1919 at the Café des Tourelles in Paris he joined Norman Fitts and nine others including Stephen Vincent Benét, Roger Sessions, and Thornton Wilder in what became "S4N Society." Ramon became the most consistent and loyal contributor to the little magazine that resulted from this meeting S4N, which published E.E. Cummings, Hart Crane, and others.

Beginning in the mid-1920s Guthrie became an important emotional and literary support of Sinclair Lewis. George Seldes claimed "Of all the persons on whom Sinclair Lewis relied most from 1927 onward, either for help in his work, or as a sounding board for ideas, or as a critic, a commentator on pieces of future novels he would act out spontaneously, the chosen one was Ramon Guthrie."

== Life ==
=== 1896-1916: Early years of poverty and labor ===
14 January 1896, Raymon Hollister Guthrie is born in New York City (he claimed his birth certificate said 13 January but his mother said 14 January) to Harry and Ella May Guthrie (née Hollister). Supposedly named after a singer, Raymon Moore, he later discards both the “y” and his middle name. He has an older sister, Eleanor, probably born in 1889. In 1898 or so Harry decamps with another woman and vanishes from sight. (Guthrie said his father eventually remarried and that he saw him only once again, in 1905, for a few minutes. He believed his father died in 1910 in an unsuccessful attempt to prevent another's suicide by gas.) Years of grinding poverty follow. Mrs. Guthrie moves to Hartford and supports her children with difficulty, running a boarding house, working as a dressmaker, Christian Science practitioner, and manicurist, etc. Due to her poor health the children probably spend a brief period in an orphanage when Guthrie is about five (despite his mother's Connecticut relatives). After completing grammar school, Guthrie is unable, for financial reasons, to accept a scholarship to the Hartford Art School. He works at odd jobs and in the Underwood typewriter factory and flunks out of night school. From 1912 to 1915, however, he manages to attend the Northfield Mount Hermon School (in Massachusetts) for part of cadi year. Several of his poems appear in The Hermonite. (Sec "The Archangel Michael” for Mount Hermon's evangelical flavor.) In 1915 Mrs. Guthrie has her first stroke and moves in with a sister near New Haven. Guthrie goes to work for the Winchester Repeating Arms factory in New Haven, at this time busy filling war orders. He works on the night shift straightening draw punches. After another stroke early in 1916 his mother commits suicide in the charity ward of the New Haven Hospital. (See “Fiercer Than Evening Wolves” for details of this early period.)

=== 1916-22: War and coming of age in France ===
Guthrie decides not to return to Mount Hermon in the fall and instead enlists in the 10th Connecticut Field Artillery. (Eleanor, whom Guthrie remembered as given to temper tantrums, has married. She and her brother are essentially estranged from 1916 on. Guthrie said she later married Lt. Col. Charles Wallington Furlong and was a friend of Mary Baker Eddy.) In December, however, he sails for France as a volunteer with the American Field Service and is an ambulance driver with the Eighth Army on the Western Front for several months and then with the Armee de l’Orient in the Balkans. Returning to France, Guthrie joins the U.S. Army's Aviation Section Signal Corps and trains as an observer. (He said he was afraid the war would be over before he could complete training as a pilot.) He walks away from a spectacular plane crash, which results in bouts of amnesia (see “ ‘Visse, Scrisse, Amo’ ” ) and various nervous disorders, among them acusis—intolerance of loud noise—and acute attacks of anxiety and panic. (The crash is severe enough to entitle him to a disability pension.) He is assigned to the Eleventh Bombing Squadron and participates in a disastrous raid over La Chaussee in which an incompetent major sends the planes aloft with machine guns out of order and without a fighter escort. Guthrie and his pilot, the only survivors, are forced to watch the other planes shot down (see “Death with Pants On” ). Fortunately, their machine gun is working, and Guthrie shoots down two enemy fighters and survives to become a successful formation leader and to shoot down two more. He is awarded two citations, one of them the Silver Star. While serving in the army he discovers Paris and his future wife, Marguerite Maurey from Nancy. At the end of the war he takes a course in French civilization at the Sorbonne, but in the summer of 1919 he is shipped back to the States. After several hospitalizations (see his novel Parachute, based on a hospital for convalescent airmen in Cooperstown) and a few months’ work as an insurance investigator, he returns to France. His poems appear in Norman Fitts's little magazine S4N (which Fitts had founded along with Guthrie, Stephen Vincent Benet, Roger Sessions, Thornton Wilder, and others), and in Paris Review: The Illustrated American Magazine in France. He studies political science at Toulouse under a disability pension, earning two special degrees for foreigners, the license and doctorat en droit, in 1921 and 1922; but he continues his literary studies and poetry, including translations from the Provençal.

=== 1922-29: The flourishing of a poet-novelist-translator ===
On 8 April 1922 Guthrie marries Marguerite in Toulouse. They move to Paris, and during 1922-23 he works on a semi-autobiographical novel, “Philip” (unpublished except for one chapter, “Marchand d’habits,” in the January–February 1923 issue of S4N). He writes poetry, follows courses at the Sorbonne in Old French and Provençal, is rumored to have become one of Otto Rank's patients, and participates in the literary and artistic life centered in Montparnasse. (See “Ezra Pound in Paris and Elsewhere,” “Montparnasse,” and “For Approximately the Same Reason.” ) The Guthries return to the United States in 1923, also the year of his first collection of poems, Trobar Clus (the first book put out by the S4N Society). Malcolm Cowley introduces Guthrie to the avant-garde literary scene in New York, but Guthrie's search for a job takes him to the University of Arizona, where he teaches French language and literature courses from 1924 to 1926. (See “The Clown: Hurrah for the Petrified Forest” and “There Are Those.” ) In 1926 the Guthries return to France and the eminently congenial expatriate milieu—partly at the instigation of Sinclair Lewis, whose collaboration with and dependence on Guthrie absorb much of the poet's time and energy over the next decades. Besides Trobar Clus (1923), Guthrie publishes his novel Marcabrun (1926); another collection of poems (A World Too Old, 1927); a translation of Bernard Fay's The Revolutionary Spirit in France and America (1927); a second novel (Parachute, 1928); and the risqué narrative poem The Legend of Ermengarde (1929). That year the Guthries return to the United States, probably for economic reason.

=== 1930-63: The Dartmouth years and relative poetic silence ===
From 1930 to 1963, except for a stint in the O.S.S. during World War II in France and Algiers as liaison with the French Resistance (for which he is also cited)—see “Fragment of a Travelogue” and “For Approximately the Same Reason”—Guthrie teaches full-time at Dartmouth College (Hanover, New Hampshire), specializing in Proust. He makes his home across the border in Norwich, Vermont, and returns to France as frequently as possible during vacations and sabbaticals, often to paint rather than write. (He once figured that he had lived 16 years in France.) He is made an Officier d’Academie in 1949 and an Officier dans I’ordre des Palmes academiques in 1963 (see “Pattern for a Brocade Shroud” ). His scholarly enterprises include occasional articles, among them discussions of his close relationship with Lewis; a number of reviews—especially for the New York Herald Tribune Book Review; the preparation of two anthologies (with George E. Diller): French Literature and Thought Since the Revolution (1942) and Prose and Poetry of Modem France (1964); and two 1947 translations: The Republic of Silence, compiled by A.J. Liebling, and The Other Kingdom, by David Rousset. Guthrie, however, does not abandon poetry entirely during this period. In 1933 The Arts Press (Hanover) brings out his Scherzo from a Poem To Be Entitled The Proud City; in 1938 he writes his long, anti-Fascist, unpublished poem “Instead of Abel”; he participates in the Thursday evening meetings of poets living in the area (among them Richard Eberhart, Bink Noll, Thomas and Vera Vance, and Alexander Laing and—especially—his wife Dilys); and he puts together the manuscript of Graffiti (1959) for M.L. Rosenthal, then poetry advisor at Macmillan, who has also published some of his poems in The Nation. As his retirement from full-time teaching approaches (1963—although he teaches through the fall semester of 1965), his poetic output increases markedly.

=== 1964-73: Guthrie’s last years and his final poetic flourishing ===
His renaissance occurs against the backdrop of his escalating medical problems and the Vietnam War. He vehemently opposes the war—see “Some of Us Must Remember” and “Scherzo for a Dirge” —and in 1965 returns his World War I Silver Star to President Johnson in protest. His first operation for cancer of the bladder takes place in the summer of 1966, and he starts on Maximum Security Ward. He is well enough in 1967 to give some readings in France and to spend time at Yaddo, but is very ill at the beginning of 1968 and starts a course of cobalt therapy. Alexander Laing raises a subscription from Guthrie's former students and other supporters so that Emile Capouya accepts Asbestos Phoenix for Funk & Wagnalls in January. Guthrie is never aware of this arrangement. Despite his physical condition, Guthrie spends late spring and summer in Paris. (See “Boul Miche, May 1968.” ) Back home he races to correct the galleys of Asbestos Phoenix before undergoing surgery to remove his colon, which has been severely damaged by the cobalt treatment. Despite the dangerous operation and massive transfusions, he recovers enough to see Asbestos Phoenix in print and to return to Paris in the summer of 1969, but there he hemorrhages badly and ends up in the American Hospital. (See “The Dutch Head Nurse.” ) He is shipped home in such poor condition that he is not expected to recover, but with Maximum Security Ward not quite finished he insists on being taken off pain-killers so that he can complete it. By October it is at the typist's, and Robert Giroux accepts it in the spring of 1970 for Farrar, Straus & Giroux. From now until his death Guthrie is essentially house- and hospital- bound. More operations follow, and he is too sick in May 1970 (he is in fact unconscious for most of six weeks) to accept the Marjorie Peabody Waite Award of the National Institute of Arts and Letters in person, and Cowley accepts for him. But by June 1971 he is well enough to attend the Dartmouth commencement ceremonies, during which he is elected an honorary member of Phi Beta Kappa and receives the Litt.D. Compounding his surgical problems, however, are Parkinson's Disease, asthma, double vision, and eventually hallucinations, he is hospitalized for much of 1972 and 1973. 22 November 1973, Thanksgiving Day, having finally succeeded in getting himself released from the hospital but not from his unrelenting physical and mental torment, Guthrie takes an overdose of phenobarbital. He dies at Mary Hitchcock Memorial Hospital in Hanover in the afternoon. His grave, marked by a miniature dolmen, overlooks Norwich. Marguerite dies three years later.

== Bibliography ==
=== Poetry ===
Trobar Clus, Northampton, Mass., S4N, 1923

A World Too Old, New York, George H. Doran Co., [c.1927].

Graffiti. New York, Macmillan, 1959

Scherzo from a poem to be entitled; The Proud City. [a chapbook], Hanover, N. H., The Arts Press, 1933

Asbestos Phoenix, New York, Funk and Wagnal, 1968

Maximum Security Ward, New York, Farrar, Straus & Giroux, 1970; Doubleday Ltd, Toronto, Canada, 1970; and as Maximum Security Ward: Poem on the Point of Death, Sidgwick & Jackson, London, England, 1971

Maximum Security Ward and Other Poems, edited by Sally M. Gall, New York, Persea Books, 1984

=== Novels ===
Marcabrun: the chronicle of a foundling who spoke evil of women and of love and followed unawed the paths of arrogance until they led to madness: and of his dealings with women and of ribald words, the which brought him repute as a great rascal and as a great singer. New York, George H. Doran Co., [c.1926].

Parachute. New York, Harcourt, Brace and Co., [c.1928].

=== Translations ===
The Other Kingdom, by David Rousset. New York, Reynal & Hitchcock, [1947].[Includes an introduction by the translator.]

The Republic of Silence, compiled and edited by A. J. Liebling. New York, Harcourt, Brace and Co., [1947]. [Includes "Notes on the Vercors," by the translator, p. 280-281.]

The Revolutionary Spirit in France and America; a study of moral and intellectual relations between France and the United States at the end of the eighteenth century, by Bernard Fay. New York, Harcourt, Brace & Co., [c.1927].

=== Anthologies ===
French Literature and Thought Since the Revolution, edited by Ramon Guthrie and George E. Diller. New York, Harcourt, Brace and Co., [1942].

French Literature of the Twentieth Century, edited by Ramon Guthrie and George E. Diller. New York, Charles Scribner's Sons, [1964].

=== Articles in journals, newspapers and magazines ===
"Anent truth," S4N, 14th issue ([December?] 1920).

"Art credo—a challenge," S4N, 5th issue (March 1920).

"The birth of a myth, or how we wrote Dodsworth," Dartmouth College Library Bulletin, n.s., vol. 3, no. 3 (April–October i960), 50–54.

"Dilys Laing," the Nation, vol. 190, no. 10 (March 5, i960), 212. [Foreword to "Five last poems," by Dilys Laing.]

"Dilys Laing (1906–1960)," Carleton Miscellany, vol. 4, no. 1 (Winter 1963), 9–13. [Foreword to "Poems," by Dilys Laing.]

"French language and literature," American Peoples' Encyclopedia.

"The ‘Labor Novel’ that Sinclair Lewis never wrote: the curious and revealing saga of the phantom project that carried his greatest literary hopes," New York Herald Tribune Book Review, vol. 28, no. 26 (February 10, 1952), I, 6.

"Letter[s]," S4N, 2nd issue (December 1919); 3rd issue (January 1920); 7th issue (May 1920).

"Lettre d’un Americain," La Pensie, n.s., no. 26 (Septembre-Octobre 1949), 128–130. "Marcel Ayme: he throws rocks at sacred cows," New York Herald Tribune Book Review, August 13, 1961, p. 7.

"Note," S4N, 1st issue (November 1919).

"On serious young men," S4N, 11th issue (September 1920).

"An open letter to Sydney Hook," Dartmouth Quarterly, vol. 2, no. X (Spring 1948), 3–6. • reprinted: ibid., vol. 14, no. 2 (Winter 1959), 12–13, 16–17. "Proust’s La Prisonniere," Explicator, vol. 8, no. 8 (June 1950), article 57

"Le rôle du corps électoral dans le gouvernement fédeéral des États-Unis." Toulouse, Impr. du Sud-Ouest, 1922.

"Sinclair Lewis and the ‘Labor Novel,’ " American Academy of Arts and Letters, National Institute of Arts and Letters. Proceedings, 2nd series, no. 2, 1952, p. 68-82.

"Stendhal’s "Le rouge et le noir," Explicator,", vol. 7, no. 5 (March 1949), article 40.

"Stevens’ "Lions in Sweden,"" Explicator, vol. 20, no. 4 (December 1961), article 32.

"Typesetter’s despair," S4N, 26th-29th issue, combined (May–August 1923).

=== Poetry in periodicals and anthologies ===
"Billy and the once-upon: a cosmogony," Dartmouth Quarterly, vol. 9, no. 4 (June 1954), 10. reprinted: Beloit Poetry Journal, vol. 8, no. 3 (Spring 1958), 31-32.

"The clown: he dances in the clearing by night," the Nation, vol. 185, no. 14 (November 2, 1957). p. 37.

"The clown: oral examination," New York Times Book Review, vol. 65, no. 19, pt. 1 (May 8, 1960), p. 2.

"The clown’s report on satyrs," the Nation, vol. 187, no. 17 (November 22, 1958), p. 388.

"A comparison of angels," Carleton Miscellany, vol. 1, no. 1 (Winter i960), pp. 76-77.

"L’enfance de la sirene," Poetry, vol. 100, no. 6 (September 1962), pp. 365-366.

"Europa," the Nation, vol. 185, no. 18 (November 30, 1957). p. 408.

"Ezra Pound in Paris and elsewhere," the Nation, vol. 185, no. 16 (November 16, 1957), p. 345.

"The fool and the beggar," Hermonite, vol. 27, no. 17 (July 4, 1914), p. 304.

"Fragments of a travelog," Beloit Poetry Journal, vol. 8, no. 3 (Spring 1958). pp. 32-34

‘‘Garden-party," Saturday Review of Literature, vol. 2, no. 9 (September 26, 1925), p. 149.

"In vino," S4N, 13th issue (November 1920).

"Jan van Stuybrant," Hermonite, vol. 27, no. 16 (June 20, 1914), p. 289.

"A lovely morning at Beaumont barracks," Hip Pocket Poems, no. 2 (May i960), p. 21-22.

"Marchand d’habits," S4N, 24th issue (January–February 1923).

"Megallesia," S4N, 26th-29th issue, combined (May–August 1923). [By Anne Zimmerman, pseud.]

"Melitta," S4N, 19th issue (February 1922).

"Mermaids in Maine," Dartmouth Quarterly, vol. 9, no. I (Fall 1953), 14-15. reprinted: ibid., vol. 14, no. 2 (Winter 1959), 9.

"The mess of pottage," S4N, 4th issue (February 1920).

"Mr. H. G. O’Brien as Endymion," S4N, 32nd issue (February 1924), 12-20. [By Anne Zimmerman, pseud.]

"More Helen," S4N, 16th issue ([February?] 1921).

"The pagan’s creed," S4N, 9th issue (July 1920).

"The passing of Jehovah," S4N, 17th issue ([March?] 1921).

Readings from Graffiti, with introduction by Alexander Laing. Hanover, N. H., 1959. [1 reel of taped voice recording.]

Readings from Graffiti for Harvard Poetry Room, request of John Sweeney, May 23, 1961. [1 reel of taped voice recording.]

"Reasons," S4N, 21st issue ([month?] 1922).

"Recipe and introduction," Vox, vol. 1, no. 1 (Spring 1958), 13.

"Reflections on the future state of intellectual poets," S4N, i8th issue (April 1921).

"The reseda and the rose," Dartmouth Quarterly, vol. j, no. 3 (Spring 1950). [Translation of poem by Louis Aragon.]

"Richard Coeur-de-Lion," Bookman, vol. 64 (December 5, 1926), pp. 424, 425 "Salonika," S4N, nth issue (September 1920).

"Scarab," The independent poetry anthology, 1925 .... [New York, Burke Printing Company, c.1925], p. 70.

"Some aspect* of baroque architecture (on a theme by Francesco Gemi- niani, born in Lucca 1667, died in Dublin 1762)," Greensleeves, vol. 1, no. 1 (1959) pp. 18, 19

"Sonnet," S4N, 7th issue (May 1920).

"Springsong in East Gruesome, Vt.," Carleton Miscellany, vol. 2, no. 1 (Winter 1960–61), pp. 42, 43.

"To and on other intellectual poets on reading that the U.S.A.F. had sent a team of scientists to Africa to learn why giraffes do not black out," the Nation, vol. 185, no. 13 (October 26, 1957), p. 292.

"The triumph," S4N, 13th issue (November 1920).

"Unveiling a statue to a one-time poet," the Nation, vol. 191, no. 11 (October 8, 1960), p. 232.

"The upside-down bug," Vox, vol. 1, no. 1 (Spring 1958), pp. 13, 14.

"A word or two for war poets," S4N,12th issue (October 1920).
