= Burt Reinhardt =

American journalist

Burton Reinhardt
- Born: April 19, 1920; New York City, New York
- Died: May 10, 2011 (aged 91); Marietta, Georgia
- Spouse: Diana Shaw
- Children: Cheryl Reinhardt; Gary Reinhardt; Barry S. Reinhardt (predeceased)

Burton Reinhardt (April 19, 1920 – May 10, 2011) was an American journalist and news executive, who served as executive Vice President of CNN from 1980 to 1982 and the second President of CNN from 1982 to 1990. In his capacity as vice president, Reinhardt helped to hire most of CNN's first 200 employees, including the cable network's first news anchor, Bernard Shaw.

== Biography ==
Reinhardt was born to a Jewish family in New York City on April 19, 1920. He began working as an assistant cameraman for the Movietone News newsreel company in 1939. He served as a combat cameraman with the United States Army's pictorial service in the Pacific theater during World War II.

Reinhardt became Fox Movietone News' managing editor following the end of World War II. He then became the executive vice president of United Press International's (UPI) television film division, the UPI Newsfilm. Reinhardt then co-founded UPI's television news agency, United Press International Television News (UPITN), during the late 1960s. He next served as Paramount Pictures' executive vice president of the "non-theatrical and educational film division."

He departed Paramount Pictures to help launch CNN at the invitation of its founder Ted Turner. Turner, who actively recruited Reinhardt to CNN, later wrote that Reinhardt was "a seasoned professional who knew how to get things done," in his autobiography, Call Me Ted. CNN was launched in 1980, with Reinhardt serving as the network's executive vice president from 1980 to 1982. As executive VP. Reinhardt recruited and hired most of CNN's first 200 employees, including Bernard Shaw, who became CNN's first news anchor. Reinhardt was also responsible for all financial decisions made by the network during the first two years of CNN on-air.

In January 1982, Ted Turner appointed Reinhardt as the second President of CNN, succeeding Reese Schonfeld. He would serve as CNN's president for the next eight years. As president, Reinhardt oversaw the creation of several of CNN's most prominent shows, including Larry King Live, which aired from 1985 to 2011, and Crossfire. He arranged for CNN to charge other news organizations a price for the reuse of CNN's on-air news pieces. Reinhardt created to share news with local news affiliates in the United States, later expanding the exchange program to include international broadcasts, including China. Reinhardt also expanded much of CNN infrastructure, including the establishment of approximately twenty news bureaux around the world.

According to The Washington Post, Reinhardt supported live coverage of the rescue of Jessica McClure, known as Baby Jessica, who was trapped in a well in Midland, Texas, for fifty-eight hours in 1987. Reinhardt also spearheaded live coverage of all Space Shuttle launches during the 1980s. The move allowed CNN to unexpectedly broadcast the Space Shuttle Challenger disaster live on television in January 1986.

Reinhardt placed the CNN logo in the lower right-hand corner of the television screen in 1988. The addition of the logo initially angered some CNN affiliates, who viewed the logo as distracting, although some claim that the move helped to make CNN an easily identifiable brand, which has been copied by other television networks.

Reinhardt stepped down as president of CNN in 1990 and was succeeded by broadcast executive, Tom Johnson. Johnson, CNN's third president, later called Reinhardt, "instrumental in the success of CNN." Reinhardt remained with CNN in several capacities until his retirement in 2003.

Burt Reinhardt died at his home in Marietta, Georgia, of complications from a series of strokes on May 10, 2011, at the age of 91. He was buried in Union, New Jersey. He was survived by his wife of 59 years, Diana Shaw Reinhardt and two children: Cheryl Reinhardt and Gary Reinhardt. Another son, Barry S. Reinhardt, died in 1960.
