= United Press International =

American international news agency

United Press International, Inc.
- Trade name: UPI
- Industry: Journalism
- Founded: 1907; 119 years ago (as United Press Associations); 1958; 68 years ago (as United Press International)
- Headquarters: 1200 N. Federal Highway, Suite 200; Boca Raton, Florida 33432
- Parent: News World Communications
- Website: www.upi.com

United Press International (UPI) is an American international news agency whose newswires, photo, news film, and audio services provided news material to thousands of newspapers, magazines, radio and television stations for most of the 20th century until its eventual decline beginning in the early 1980s. At its peak, it had more than 6,000 media subscribers. Since the first of several sales and staff cutbacks in 1982, and the 1999 sale of its broadcast client list to its main U.S. rival, the Associated Press, UPI has concentrated on smaller information-market niches.

== History ==
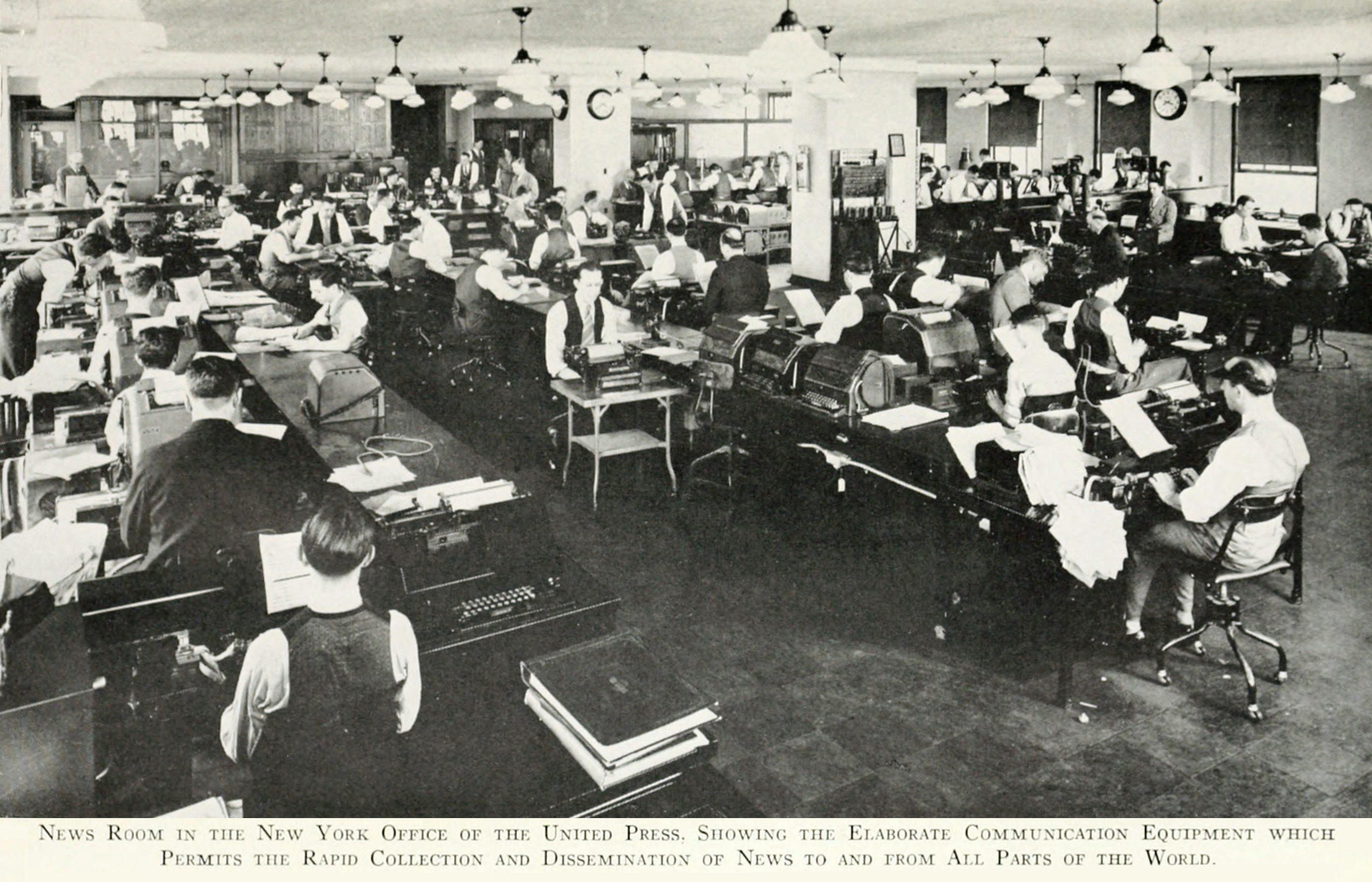
News room of United Press in New York, 1933

Formally named United Press Associations for incorporation and legal purposes but publicly known and identified as United Press or UP, the news agency was created by the 1907 uniting of three smaller news syndicates by the Midwest newspaper publisher E. W. Scripps. It was headed by Hugh Baillie (1890–1966) from 1935 to 1955. At the time of his retirement, UP had 2,900 clients in the United States, and 1,500 abroad.

In 1958, it became United Press International after absorbing the International News Service (INS) in May. As either UP or UPI, the agency was among the largest newswire services in the world, competing domestically for about 90 years with the Associated Press (AP) and internationally with AP, Reuters and Agence France-Presse (AFP).

At its peak, UPI had more than 2,000 full-time employees and 200 news bureaus in 92 countries; it had more than 6,000 media subscribers. With the rising popularity of television news, the business of UPI began to decline as the circulation of afternoon newspapers, its chief client category, began to fall. Its decline accelerated after the 1982 sale of UPI by the Scripps company.

The E. W. Scripps Company controlled United Press until its absorption of William Randolph Hearst's smaller competing agency, INS, in 1958 to form UPI. With the Hearst Corporation as a minority partner, UPI continued under Scripps management until 1982.

Since its sale in 1982, UPI has changed ownership several times and was twice in Chapter 11 bankruptcy reorganization. With each change in ownership came deeper service and staff cutbacks and changes of focus and a corresponding shrinkage of its traditional media customer base. Since the 1999 sale of its broadcast client list to its one-time major rival, the AP, UPI has concentrated on smaller information market niches. It no longer services media organizations in a major way.

In 2000, UPI was purchased by News World Communications, an international news media company founded in 1976 by Unification Church leader Sun Myung Moon.

It now maintains a news website and photo service and electronically publishes several information product packages. Based mostly on aggregation from other sources on the Web and gathered by a small editorial staff and stringers, UPI's daily content consists of a newsbrief summary service called "NewsTrack", which includes general, business, sports, science, health and entertainment reports, and "Quirks in the News". It also sells a premium service, which has deeper coverage and analysis of emerging threats, the security industry, and energy resources. UPI's content is presented in text, video and photo formats, in English, Spanish, and Arabic.

UPI's main office is in the Miami metropolitan area and it maintains office locations in five other countries and uses freelance journalists in other major cities.

=== British United Press ===
In 1923, UP founded British United Press as its Canadian subsidiary with headquarters in Montreal. It soon expanded to the United Kingdom and India, and was one of several news agencies supplying news bulletins to the BBC until the broadcaster began hiring its own reporters. The BBC's decision in 1936 to use BUP as a supplier of international news reports engendered opposition from other news agencies and the Foreign Office as BUP was seen as a front group for the American-based United Press and thus represented American rather than British news values. BUP correspondents included future anchors Knowlton Nash and Walter Cronkite. In 1936, BUP launched Canada's first coast-to-coast radio newswire service providing news copy to private radio stations across the country.

In 1940, the Canadian government suspended the broadcast licenses of BUP and Transradio Press Service both of whom, unlike Canadian Press, sold commercial sponsorships for its news bulletins in violation of government policy. Transport minister C.D. Howe, who was responsible for broadcasting policy, announced that the two wire services must "show their news source is accurate" in order to retain their licenses. After complaints by Transradio that the move was an attempt by "selfish publishing and monopolistic interests … to destroy independent news services throughout the Dominion", the Canadian Broadcasting Corporation, which at the time was also responsible for regulating private radio broadcasters, agreed to reinstate Transradio's and BUP's licenses while also announcing a plan to enforce the ban on commercial news broadcasts by editing dispatches by the wire services before they were distributed to radio stations.

In 1958, when United Press merged with the International News Service to become UPI, British United Press was renamed United Press International of Canada. In 1979, 80% of UPI Canada was sold to the Toronto Sun newspaper chain and renamed United Press Canada. In 1985, UPC was sold to Canadian Press, which absorbed it.

=== United Press Associations ===
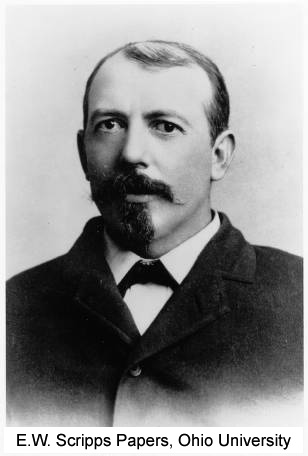
Portrait photograph of E. W. Scripps, c. 1912

Beginning with the Cleveland Press, publisher E. W. Scripps (1854–1926) created the first chain of newspapers in the United States. Because the then-recently reorganized Associated Press refused to sell its services to several of his papers, most of them evening dailies in competition with existing AP franchise holders, in 1907 Scripps merged three smaller syndicates under his ownership or control, the Publishers Press Association, the Scripps-McRae Press Association, and the Scripps News Association, to form United Press Associations, with headquarters in New York City.

Scripps had been a subscriber to an earlier news agency, also named United Press, that existed in the late 1800s, partly in cooperation with the management of the original New York-based AP and partly in existential competition with two Chicago-based organizations also using the AP name (as detailed at Associated Press and in AP's 2007 history, Breaking News: How the Associated Press Has Covered War, Peace, and Everything Else, cited in Notes).

Drawing lessons from the battles between the earlier United Press and the various AP's, Scripps required that there be no restrictions on who could buy news from his news service, and he made the new UP service available to anyone, including his competitors. Scripps also hoped to make a profit from selling that news to papers owned by others. At that time and until World War II, most newspapers relied on news agencies for stories outside their immediate geographic areas.

Despite strong newspaper industry opposition, UP started to sell news to the new and competitive radio medium in 1935, years before competitor AP, controlled by the newspaper industry, did likewise.

Scripps' United Press was considered "a scrappy alternative" news source to the AP. UP reporters were called "Unipressers" and were noted for their fiercely aggressive and competitive streak. Another hallmark of the company's culture was little formal training of reporters; new hires were often thrust into a "sink-or-swim" situation of reporting on an unfamiliar subject. They were weaned on UP's famous and well-documented (though frequently misappropriated and misquoted) slogan of "Get it first, but FIRST, get it RIGHT." Despite controversy, UP (and later UPI) became a common training ground for generations of journalists.

Walter Cronkite, who started with United Press in Kansas City, gained fame for his coverage of World War II in Europe and turned down Edward R. Murrow's first offer of a CBS job to stay with UP, but who later went on to anchor the CBS Evening News, once said, "I felt every Unipresser got up in the morning saying, 'This is the day I'm going to beat the hell out of AP.' That was part of the spirit. We knew we were undermanned. But we knew we could do a darn good job despite that, and so many times, we did."

Despite that, like all agencies that deal with huge volumes of timely information, UP and later UPI had its share of remembered mistakes. As recounted in the various printed histories of UPI cited in Notes, the most famous one came early in its history. UP's president, Roy W. Howard, then traveling in France, telegraphed that the 1918 armistice ending World War I had been declared four days before it happened. Howard's reputation survived and he later became a Scripps partner, whose name appeared in one of the Scripps subsidiary companies, Scripps-Howard. But the mistake dogged UP/UPI for generations. Still, the agency's reporters were often able to tell stories more quickly and accurately although they were usually outnumbered by the competition. In 1950, for example, UP reported the invasion of South Korea by North Korea two hours and forty minutes before its archrival, the AP. The New York Times later apologized to UP for refusing to print information on the invasion until the AP had confirmed it.

=== United Press International ===
Frank Bartholomew, the last UP president to ascend to the agency's top job directly from its news, rather than sales ranks, took over in 1955, and according to his memoirs cited in Notes, was obsessed with merging UP with the International News Service, a news agency that had been founded by William Randolph Hearst in 1909 following Scripps' lead.

Bartholomew succeeded in putting the "I" in UPI in 1958 when UP and INS merged to become United Press International on May 24. The new UPI now had 6,000 employees and 5,000 subscribers, about a thousand of them newspapers.

The merger was aimed at creating a stronger competitor for the Associated Press and a stronger economic entity than either UP or INS. The newly formed United Press International (UPI) had 950 client newspapers. Fearing possible antitrust issues with the Eisenhower Administration Justice Department, Scripps and Hearst rushed the merger through with unusual speed and secrecy.

Although all UP employees were retained, most INS employees lost their jobs with practically no warning. A relative few did join the new UPI and the columns of popular INS writers, such as Bob Considine, Louella Parsons and Ruth Montgomery, were carried by UPI.

Rival AP was a publishers' cooperative and could assess its members to help pay the extraordinary costs of covering major news—wars, the Olympic Games, national political conventions. UPI clients, in contrast, paid a fixed annual rate; depending on individual contracts, UPI could not always ask them to help shoulder the extraordinary coverage costs. In its heyday, newspapers typically paid UPI about half what they paid AP in the same cities for the same services: At one point, for example, the Chicago Sun-Times paid AP $12,500 a week, but UPI only $5,000; the Wall Street Journal paid AP $36,000 a week, but UPI only $19,300. The AP, which serviced 1,243 newspapers at the time, remained UPI's main competitor. In 1959, UPI had 6,208 clients in 92 countries and territories, 234 news and picture bureaus, and an annual payroll of $34,000,000, ($375,513,699 in today's dollars).

But the UP-INS merger involved another business component that was to hurt the new UPI company badly in later years. Because INS had been a subsidiary of Hearst's King Features Syndicate and Scripps controlled several other newspaper syndicates, both companies feared possible antitrust issues. So they deliberately kept their respective syndicates out of the combined UPI company. That move cost UPI the revenues of its previous United Feature Syndicate subsidiary, which in later years made large profits on the syndication of Peanuts and other popular comic strips and columns.

UPI had an advantage of independence over the AP in reporting on the Civil Rights Movement of the 1950s and 1960s. Because the AP was a cooperative essentially owned by the newspapers, those in the South influenced its coverage of the racial unrest and protests, often ignoring, minimizing, or slanting the reporting. UPI did not have that sort of pressure, and management, according to UPI reporters and photographers of the day, allowed them much freedom in chronicling the events of the civil rights struggle.

White House reporter Helen Thomas became the public face of UPI, as she was seen at televised press conferences beginning in the early 1960s. UPI famously scooped the AP in reporting the assassination of US President John Kennedy on Friday, November 22, 1963. UPI White House reporter Merriman Smith was an eyewitness, and he commandeered the press car's only phone to dictate the story to UPI as AP reporter Jack Bell tried—without success—to wrest the phone away so he could call his office. Smith and UPI won a Pulitzer Prize for this reporting.

=== UP/UPI Newspictures, Newsfilm and Audio/Radio Network ===
United Press had no direct wirephoto service until 1952, when it absorbed co-owned ACME Newspictures, under pressure from parent company Scripps to better compete with AP's news and photo services.

By that time, UP was also deeply involved with the newer visual medium of television. In 1948, it entered into a partnership with 20th Century Fox subsidiary Fox Movietone News to shoot newsfilm for television stations. That service, United Press Movietone, or UPMT, was a pioneer in newsfilm syndication and numbered among its clients major US and foreign networks and local stations, including for many years the early TV operation of ABC News. In subsequent decades, it underwent several changes in partnerships and names, becoming best known as United Press International Television News (UPITN). Senior UPITN executives later helped Ted Turner create CNN, with its first two presidents, Reese Schonfeld and Burt Reinhardt, coming from UPITN ranks.

The UPI Audio actuality service for radio stations, created in 1958 and later renamed the United Press International Radio Network, was a spinoff from the newsfilm service and eventually provided news material to more than a thousand radio stations and US and foreign networks, including NPR.

=== Decline ===
UPI came close to the size of the AP in the early 1960s, but as publishing companies began to pare their evening newspapers, it was dropped by papers that could no longer afford to subscribe to both UPI and the AP. UPI's failure to develop a television presence or subsidiary television news service has also been cited as one of the causes of its decline. By the early 1980s, the number of staffers was down to 1,800 and there were just 100 news bureaus.

Under pressure from some of E. W. Scripps' heirs, the Scripps company, which had been underwriting UPI's expenses at a loss for at least two decades, began trying to transfer control of UPI in the early 1980s. It tried to bring in additional newspaper industry partners and when that failed, engaged in serious negotiations with British competitor Reuters, which wanted to increase its US presence. As detailed in "Down to the Wire", by Gordon and Cohen, cited in Notes, Reuters did extensive due diligence and expressed an interest in parts of the UPI service, but did not wish to maintain it in full.

Scripps wound up giving the agency away to two inexperienced businessmen, Douglas Ruhe (son of David Ruhe, a member of the Universal House of Justice, the supreme governing body of the Baháʼí Faith) and William Geissler, originally associated with two better-known partners, who soon departed. Ruhe and Geissler obtained UPI for $1. Under the terms of the purchase agreement, Scripps first injected UPI with a $5 million cash balance, in acknowledgement of the $1.0 – $1.5 million per month that UPI was already losing. Facing news industry skepticism about their background and qualifications to run an international news agency, Ruhe and Geissler watched an increase in contract cancellations. Despite serious cash flow problems, they moved UPI's headquarters from New York City to Washington, DC, incurring significant additional costs due to construction cost overruns.

During this period, UPI's 25-year-old audio news actuality service for radio stations was renamed the United Press International Radio Network. But faced with recurring cash shortages and difficulty meeting payroll, the Ruhe-Geissler management sold UPI's foreign photo service and some rights to its US and foreign photos to the Reuters news agency. In 1995, UPI's U.S. photo library, which included the archives of predecessor Scripps photo agency Acme and the pictures and negatives of International News Photos, the picture component of Hearst's INS, was sold to the Bettmann Archive.

Bettmann was sold to Microsoft founder Bill Gates's separate Corbis Corporation, storing them underground in Pennsylvania and digitizing them for licensing, frequently without any notation of their UPI origins.

In August 2011, Corbis and AP agreed to distribute each other's photos to their clients, effectively combining the pre-1983 UPI library with that of its former main rival for some marketing purposes.

In 2016, Corbis was sold to the Visual China Group.

UPI's remaining minority stake in UPITN was also sold and the agency was renamed Worldwide Television News (WTN). As with its photographs, UPI thereby lost all control of its newsfilm and video library, which is now held by WTN-successor Associated Press Television News, which entered the video news field long after UPI left it.

Years of mismanagement, missed opportunities and continual wage and staff cuts followed. By 1984, UPI had descended into the first of two Chapter 11 bankruptcies. Mario Vázquez Raña, a Mexican media magnate, with a nominal American minority partner, Houston real estate developer Joseph Russo, purchased UPI out of bankruptcy for $40 million, losing millions during his short tenure, and firing numerous high-level staff.

In 1988, Vázquez Raña sold UPI to Infotechnology, Inc., an information technology and venture capital company and parent company of cable TV's Financial News Network, both headed by Earl Brian, who also became UPI chairman. In early 1991, Infotechnology itself filed for bankruptcy, announced layoffs at UPI and sought to terminate certain employee benefits in an attempt to keep UPI afloat. At that point, UPI was down to 585 employees. Later that year, UPI filed for bankruptcy for the second time, asking for relief from $50 million in debt so that it could be sale-able. In 1992, a group of Saudi investors, ARA Group International (AGI), bought the bankrupt UPI for $4 million.

By 1998, UPI had fewer than 250 employees and 12 offices. Although the Saudi-based investors claimed to have poured more than $120 million into UPI, it had failed to turn a profit. The company had begun to sell Internet-adapted products to such websites as Excite and Yahoo. At that point, UPI CEO Arnaud de Borchgrave orchestrated UPI's exit from its last major media niche, the broadcast news business that United Press had initiated in the 1930s. De Borchgrave maintained that "what was brilliant pioneering work on the part of UPI prior to World War II, with radio news, is now a static quantity and so far as I'm concerned, certainly doesn't fit into my plans for the future". He sought to shift UPI's dwindling resources into Internet-based delivery of newsletter services, focusing more on technical and diplomatic specialties than on general news. The rump UPI thus sold the client list of its still-significant radio network and broadcast wire to its former rival, the AP.

=== Current ownership ===
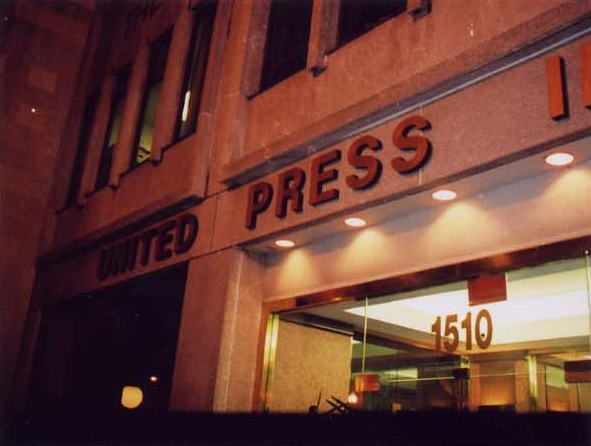
United Press International office in Washington D.C., c. 2005

UPI was purchased in May 2000 by News World Communications, a media conglomerate founded by Unification Church founder Sun Myung Moon, which also owned The Washington Times and newspapers in South Korea, Japan, and South America. The next day, UPI's White House correspondent, Helen Thomas, resigned her position, after working for UPI for 57 years.

In 2007, as part of a restructuring to keep UPI in business and profitable, management cut 11 staff from its Washington, D.C. office and no longer had a reporter in the White House press corps or a bureau covering the United Nations. UPI spokespersons and press releases said the company would be focusing instead on expanding operations in the Middle East, Central Asia and Africa, and reporting on security threats, intelligence and energy issues. In 2008, UPI began UPIU, a journalism mentoring platform for students and journalism schools, that allowed recent college graduates to post their work on the site but did not pay for stories.

== UPI sports awards ==
United Press International conferred sports awards annually until 1996. The awards were given to basketball players, basketball coaches, football players and athletes in general. The different awards were:

- UPI Athlete of the Year

=== Basketball ===
- UPI College Basketball Coach of the Year
- UPI College Basketball Player of the Year

=== Football ===
- UPI College Football Player of the Year
- UPI College Lineman of the Year
- UPI NFC Player of the Year
- UPI AFL-AFC Player of the Year
- UPI NFL Rookie of the Year
- UPI NFL Player of the Year

== Key UP/UPI product and technical innovation dates ==
- In 1908, UP began offering feature stories and using reporter bylines.
- In 1915, UP begins to use teleprinters, more recently known as Teletype machines.
- In the 1930s and 1940s, UP Newspictures predecessor agency Acme developed the International Unifax machine, the first automatic picture receiver.
- The "Ocean Press", a news service for ocean liners, was founded in the 1930s, as a corporate subsidiary of Scripps. It used copy from United Press and later United Press International. By 1959, it had 125 subscriber ships.
- In 1935, UP was the first major news service to offer news to broadcasters.
- In 1945, UP offered the first all-sports wire.
- In 1948, UP started the first international television news film service. Originally named "UP Movietone", in view of a partnership with the Movietone News service of 20th Century Fox, it went through several partnerships and name changes and was known as United Press International Television News or simply as UPITN, a name which also credited UPI's film and video service partner at the time, Britain's ITN television news service.
- In 1951, UP offered the first teletypesetter (TTS) service, enabling newspapers to automatically set and justify type from wire transmissions.
- In 1952 UP, absorbed the Scripps-owned Acme photo service to form UP Newspictures
- In 1958 United Press absorbed Hearst's INS to create UPI
- In 1958, UPI created the first wire service audio network, an offshoot of the film service above. UPI Audio provided news material to radio stations. It was renamed United Press International Radio Network in 1983.
- In 1974, UPI launched the first "high-speed" data newswire—operating at 1,200 WPM.
- In 1978, UPI launched the first cable TV news network, UPI Newstime, using SSTV technology via satellite to relay the channel to cable TV companies nationwide in the USA.
- In 1979, UPI along with Telecomputing Corp. of America began making the UPI world news report available to owners of home computers.
- In 1982, UPI pioneered a coding system allowing clients to choose stories based on topic, subtopic and location.

== See also ==
- List of UPI reporters
- List of online image archives
- List of news agencies

== Notes ==
- Breaking News: How the Associated Press Has Covered War, Peace, and Everything Else. Princeton Architectural Press. June 17, 2007. pp. 432. ISBN 978-1-56898-689-0.
- Baillie, Hugh (1959). High Tension: The Recollections of Hugh Baillie. Harper & Brothers. p. 300. ISBN 0-8369-1543-7.
- Bartholomew, Frank H. (1983). Bart, Memoirs of Frank H. Bartholomew: President, United Press, 1955–58, United Press International, 1958–62. Sonoma, Calif.: Vine Brook Press. pp. 231. OCLC 39551960.
- Cronkite, Walter (November 27, 1996). A Reporter's Life (1st ed.). Knopf. pp. 400. ISBN 0-394-57879-1.
- Daniloff, Nicholas (April 7, 2008). Of Spies and Spokesmen: My Life As a Cold War Correspondent. University of Missouri Press. pp. 440. ISBN 978-0-8262-1804-9.
- Fenby, Jonathan (February 12, 1986). The International News Services. Schocken Books. pp. 275. ISBN 0-8052-3995-2.
- Gordon, Gregory & Cohen, Ronald E. (1990). Down to the Wire: UPI's Fight for Survival. New York: McGraw-Hill Publishing Company. pp. 429. ISBN 0-07-023804-9. OCLC 19519378.
- Harnett, Richard & Ferguson, Billy G. (January 1, 2003). UNIPRESS: United Press International, Covering the 20th Century. Fulcrum Publishing. p. 384. ISBN 1-55591-481-0.
- Haynes, Gary (September 2006). Picture This! The Inside Story and Classic Photos of UPI Newspictures. Bulfinch Press. p. 256. ISBN 0-8212-5758-7.
- Helms, Richard, with William Hood. A Look over My Shoulder: A Life in the Central Intelligence Agency. New York: Random House, 2003.
- Lewis, Boyd DeWolf (1981). Not Always a Spectator: A Newsman's Story. Vienna, Va.: Wolf's Head Press. pp. 327. OCLC 7968758.
- Morris, Joe Alex (October 31, 1968). Deadline Every Minute: The Story of the United Press. Praeger. p. 356. ISBN 0-8371-0175-1.
- Olson, Lynn & Cloud, Stanley W. (October 31, 1997). The Murrow Boys: Pioneers on the Front Lines of Broadcast Journalism. Mariner Books. p. 445. ISBN 0-395-87753-9.
- Powers, Thomas. The Man Who Kept the Secrets: Richard Helms and the CIA. New York: Alfred A. Knopf, 1979.
- Read, Donald (1992). The Power of News. The History of Reuters 1849–1989. Oxford: Oxford University Press. ISBN 0-19-821776-5.
- Schonfeld, Reese (January 1, 2001). Me and Ted Against the World: The Unauthorized Story of the Founding of CNN. Collins. p. 432. ISBN 0-06-019746-3.
- Schwarzlose, Richard (June 1979). The American Wire Services. Arno Press. p. 453. ISBN 0-405-11774-4.
- Schwarzlose, Richard (January 1, 1989). Nation's Newsbrokers Volume 1: The Formative Years: From Pretelegraph to 1865. Northwestern University Press. p. 370. ISBN 0-8101-0818-6.
- Schwarzlose, Richard (February 1, 1990). Nation's Newsbrokers Volume 2: The Rush to Institution: From 1865 to 1920. Northwestern University Press. pp. 366. ISBN 0-8101-0819-4.
- Scripps, E. W.; McCabe, Charles (March 15, 2007). Damned Old Crank: A Self Portrait of E. W. Scripps Drawn From His Unpublished Writings. McCabe Press. p. 259. ISBN 978-1-4067-6151-1.
- United Press International and American Heritage Magazine (1983) [1964]. Four Days: The Historical Record of the Death of President Kennedy. American Heritage Publishing Co. p. 143. ISBN 0-671-50046-5.
