= Dennis Swanson =

American television executive (born 1938)

- Born: February 12, 1938 (age 87)
- Education: University of Illinois Urbana-Champaign (BS, MS)
- Occupation: Television executive
- Spouse: Kathy Swanson
- Children: 3

Dennis Swanson (born February 12, 1938) is an American retired television executive. In a decades-long career in the industry, he worked for all of the Big Four television networks, including positions in their owned-and-operated station groups, and a tenure as president of ABC Sports. He helped to create The Oprah Winfrey Show, and it was his suggestion that led to the Winter Olympics being staged two years after each Summer Olympics.

== Early life ==
After attending high school in Springfield, Illinois, Swanson attended the University of Illinois Urbana-Champaign, where he was a student manager for the school's men's basketball team and also worked at WILL radio and television, the university's broadcasting stations. College came at a tough time for Swanson's family; his father was dying, and he won a $500 scholarship for a chemical engineering major, quietly switching to journalism. He waited tables at the Pi Phi sorority house in exchange for meals. As a result of being in the Naval ROTC, Swanson was commissioned and promoted to the rank of captain in the Marines. He then returned to Illinois and earned a master's degree in communication and political science.

== Career ==
=== Early career ===
Swanson's broadcasting career began in 1965 as a sports reporter for WMT radio in Cedar Rapids, Iowa. He took his first Chicago job in 1966 as news producer for WGN radio and television, becoming an assignment editor for the Chicago bureau of NBC News in 1968. Three years later, he moved to NBC's local stations in Chicago, WMAQ radio and television, as a sportscaster and producer; after deciding he did not like on-camera work, he departed that position in 1974 to work for the short-lived Television News Inc. (TVN) service.

=== ABC local stations ===
After TVN folded, Swanson turned down a position as sportscaster at WJBK in Detroit to work as the executive producer of the local newscasts at KABC-TV in Los Angeles. In 1977, Swanson was promoted to news director. That same year, a series of reports on police shootings won the station a George Foster Peabody Award. Swanson was named station manager of KABC in 1981.

Swanson then was promoted to general manager of ABC's Chicago station, WLS-TV, in 1983, when its general manager resigned. One of the challenges awaiting Swanson at WLS was filling the vacancy on the station's 6 pm newscast resulting from the death of Fahey Flynn. Another was to find a new host for its morning talk show, A.M. Chicago, which had been losing in its time slot to The Phil Donahue Show. Swanson filled the void by hiring Oprah Winfrey, who had been hosting a talk show at WJZ-TV in Baltimore. Winfrey immediately improved ratings over her predecessor, crediting Swanson for the "bold" selection for the time of a Black woman as host.

By February 1985, Winfrey was pulling double the ratings of Donahue; it was Swanson who suggested that Roger King of King World Productions meet Oprah, which led to her own syndicated talk show. The Oprah Winfrey Show, which the ABC owned-and-operated stations carried at launch, grew into one of television's most successful syndicated programs; in 2005, The New York Times described the move as "worth billions of dollars for ABC's stations". When Winfrey was honored with the Cecil B. DeMille Lifetime Achievement Award at the 75th Golden Globe Awards in 2018, Swanson was the first person she thanked, for taking "a chance on me".

Swanson was also credited with reversing a years-long ratings slide for WLS's newscasts, arriving at a newsroom he called a "circus". In his first months as manager, he made a slew of hires and anchor shuffles, bringing Mike Adamle on board for sports, luring Floyd Kalber out of retirement, and bringing John Drury back to the station after a stint with WGN-TV, along with a group of new reporters and specialists. By the end of Swanson's tenure, WLS was on a noted upswing in news ratings, and Winfrey and the new King World shows Wheel of Fortune and Jeopardy! were also major coups for the station. Two years after Swanson departed, under his protégé Joe Ahern, WLS-TV was described as a "juggernaut" with dominating leads in all local news time slots.

Swanson was named president of the TV stations division of ABC in 1985. In his year in this position, he paired Regis Philbin and Kathie Lee Gifford as host of WABC-TV's The Morning Show, which became Live with Regis and Kathie Lee when it entered national syndication in 1988.

=== ABC Sports ===
In 1986, Swanson was tapped to succeed Roone Arledge as president of ABC Sports; he would report to Arledge, who remained president of news and sports and would be the executive producer of ABC's coverage of the 1988 Winter Olympics. Swanson entered with an immediate need to cut costs at a division that lost a reported $40 million in 1985, with much of that loss being attributed to rights fees; many major sports contracts negotiated in prior years were written expecting higher inflation than actually occurred, causing ABC to have to absorb substantial losses. Chet Forte went as far as to say that Swanson "performed a function" for Capital Cities/ABC. He scrapped the three-man booth Arledge instituted for Monday Night Football, naming Al Michaels as the play-by-play voice. He also secured rights to the Belmont Stakes, giving ABC rights to the full Triple Crown; signed Jack Nicklaus as a golf commentator; and brought Brent Musburger to the network after his high-profile firing from CBS in 1990. One of Swanson's most enduring ideas in sports would not even air on ABC. At a breakfast with Juan Antonio Samaranch, the president of the International Olympic Committee, Swanson suggested that the IOC stagger the Summer and Winter Olympics, which at that time ran in the same year. The main reason was money, as advertisers were likely to spend less if they were hit for an Olympics twice in a year. The change would require a Winter Olympics just two years after the last, but the idea was quickly accepted by the IOC's executive committee and then its membership.

In December 1990, Swanson added oversight of the daytime and children's divisions of ABC Entertainment. He relinquished these additional responsibilities in 1993 to focus on the sports division.

Later in his tenure with the network, Swanson met a man who would later become one of his closest friends: Dick Ebersol, his counterpart at NBC Sports. In 1993, the two were attending a Chicago White Sox game when they came up with the idea that led to The Baseball Network, the two-network arrangement of Major League Baseball telecasts that ultimately was doomed by the strike that cut the 1994 MLB season short. In his last months at ABC Sports, Swanson set up meetings that helped lead to the creation of the Bowl Championship Series of college football.

=== WNBC ===
In 1995, The Walt Disney Company acquired ABC, 80 percent owner of ESPN, and a major restructuring of ABC Sports followed in which Swanson retired; he opted to leave knowing that a merged ABC Sports and ESPN did not need two presidents. On Ebersol's recommendation, he returned to the stations business as general manager of WNBC, the NBC-owned station in New York City. Swanson fortified WNBC's news standing. In 1999, it claimed ratings victories for its newscasts at 6 a.m. and 5, 6, and 11 pm, which it had not done in one period since 1988; Swanson credited the acquisition of Judge Judy with boosting early evening ratings. WNBC also rose to number one in revenue in the nation's largest media market, billing $300 million a year. Swanson led the station through its coverage of the September 11 attacks, for which Broadcasting & Cable honored Swanson as "Broadcaster of the Year" in 2002.

Swanson's invitation for syndicators to attend led to the lighting of the Rockefeller Center Christmas Tree being broadcast nationally for the first time in 1997. WNBC also increased its local coverage of such events as the Puerto Rican Day Parade, St. Patrick's Day Parade and Columbus Day Parade. In addition to running WNBC, NBC named Swanson the president of its Olympics division in 1998, with the charge of planning coverage of the Games beginning in 2000.

=== CBS ===
After leaving WNBC in 2002, Viacom hired Swanson to be the chief operating officer of its group of CBS and UPN stations. This was a tough turnaround task, as the major-market CBS stations were running no better than third in revenue in their markets; most ranked fourth or fifth. The move upset NBC executives who thought he had retired for good; Swanson cited the increased value in Viacom's stock options as one of the key reasons he moved, though he had previously stated he would retire at 65. Under Swanson, many of the CBS stations received new general managers, a number of them Swanson's former colleagues at NBC and ABC; performance improved in Miami and San Francisco, though not all stations benefited, and the group for the most part still trailed in news ratings.

=== Fox ===
After Swanson was passed over for the position of head of the CBS stations group, he left in 2005 and joined the Fox Television Stations group, reporting to Jack Abernethy. With this posting, he had now worked in the station groups of all four major networks. The Fox stations generally rated well in the morning but failed to hold onto viewers for late local news despite successful prime time fare from the network. While at Fox, NATPE honored Swanson with a Brandon Tartikoff Legacy Award.

In 2016, Swanson retired from the Fox Television Stations group.

== Personal life ==
While at the University of Illinois, Dennis met his wife, Kathy Swanson. Dennis and Kathy had three children and nine grandchildren and live in Connecticut.

In 2019, Dennis and Kathy Swanson donated $1 million toward the renovation of the basketball complex at Illinois.
