= Stella Bowen =

Australian artist and writer (1893–1947)

- Stella Bowen, Paris, 1920s
- Born: Esther Gwendolyn Bowen; 16 May 1893; North Adelaide, South Australia, Australia
- Died: 30 October 1947 (aged 54); Green End, Essex, England
- Occupations: Artist and writer
- Partner: Ford Madox Ford
- Children: Julia Madox Ford

Esther Gwendolyn "Stella" Bowen (16 May 1893 – 30 October 1947) was an Australian artist and writer.

== Early life and education ==
Esther Gwendolyn Bowen, who was known as Stella, was born on 16 May 1893 in North Adelaide, an inner suburb of Adelaide, South Australia, and educated at Tormore House School. As a young girl, Bowen enjoyed drawing and convinced her mother to allow her to study with Margaret Preston. However, her desire to pursue art training in Melbourne was thwarted by the ill health of her mother and the latter's reluctance to let her daughter follow such a career.

When her mother died in 1914, Bowen left for England with a return ticket and an allowance of £20 per month. In London, she studied at the Westminster School of Art and mixed with a company of writers, artists, poets and political activists, including T.S. Eliot, Wyndham Lewis, Violet Hunt, and William Butler Yeats.

Early in 1918, Bowen met and fell in love with the writer Ford Madox Ford. She was 24, he was 44. The couple fled to rural England where their daughter Julie was born in 1920. However, by 1922, the family were fed up with the hardships of life in the English countryside and moved temporarily to France. They soon decided to remain in France and moved to Paris.

Caught up in the bohemian café society of Paris, Ford started a literary magazine and was a leading figure among the expatriate writers. Bowen, meanwhile, found her first studio but managed little time for painting in between attending to the needs of Ford and their daughter.

== Later years ==
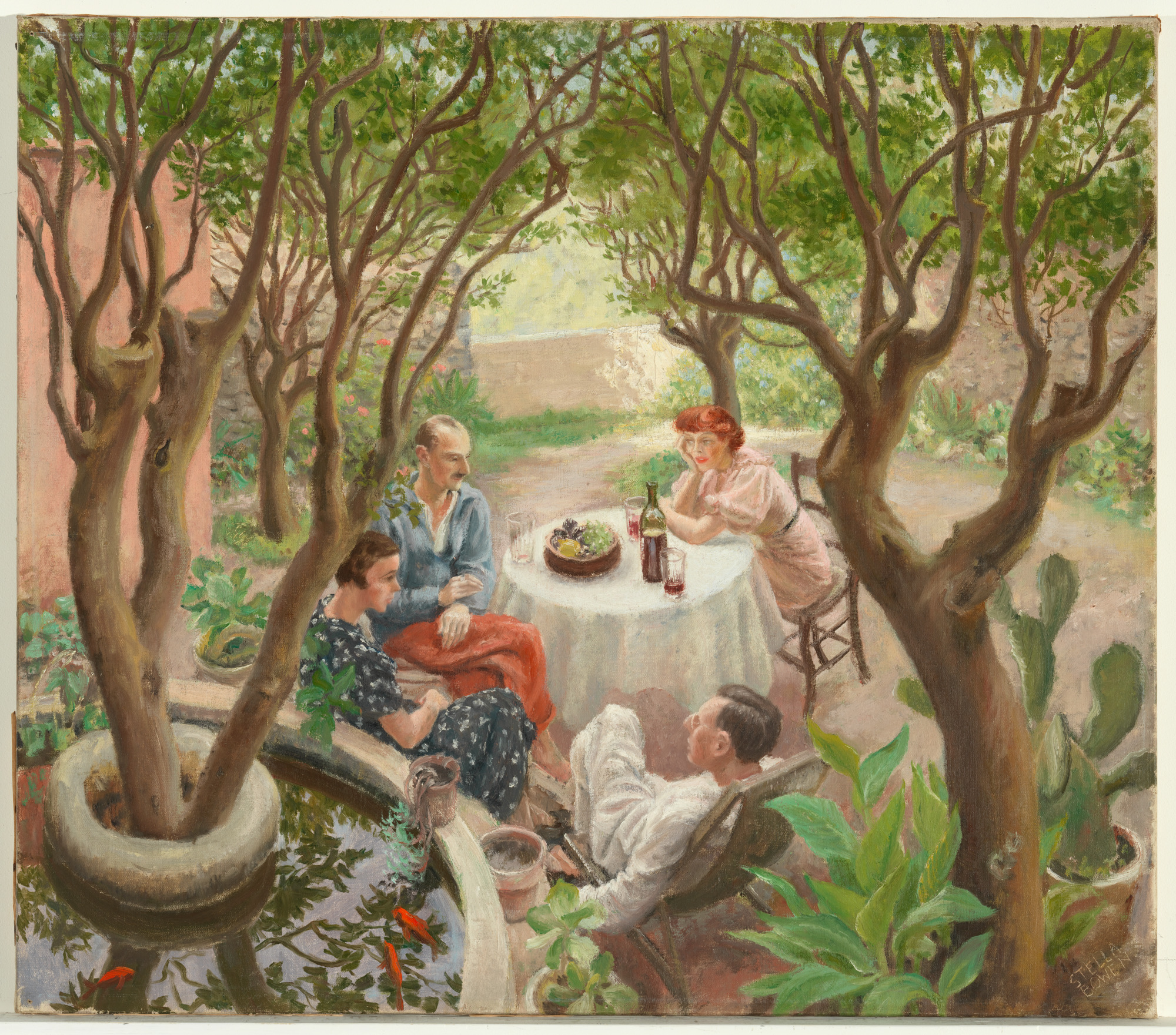
Stella Bowen: Provençal Conversation, Cagnes-sur-Mer, 1936

Bowen separated from Ford in 1927. It was a difficult time for her but it did give her the time and space to pursue her art. She began to gain some portrait commissions but still struggled to earn enough money. In 1932, she went to the United States at the invitation of the poet Ramon Guthrie, who helped her in finding commissions including, among others, with Sinclair Lewis. When she returned to France she found she could not afford to remain in Paris and returned to England on her fortieth birthday. She described her month-long stay of 1936 in Cagnes-sur-Mer with Ross and Tusnelda Sanders in her autobiography, Drawn From Life and also painted depictions of her life there.

Although Bowen continued to paint she did not earn enough from painting and commissions to make ends meet and for many years supplemented her income by writing an art review column in the News Chronicle and teaching. Because of her relationship with Ford Madox Ford she was given an advance to write a biography and produced Drawn from life: a memoir. This book came out to glowing reviews.

== World War II – war artist ==
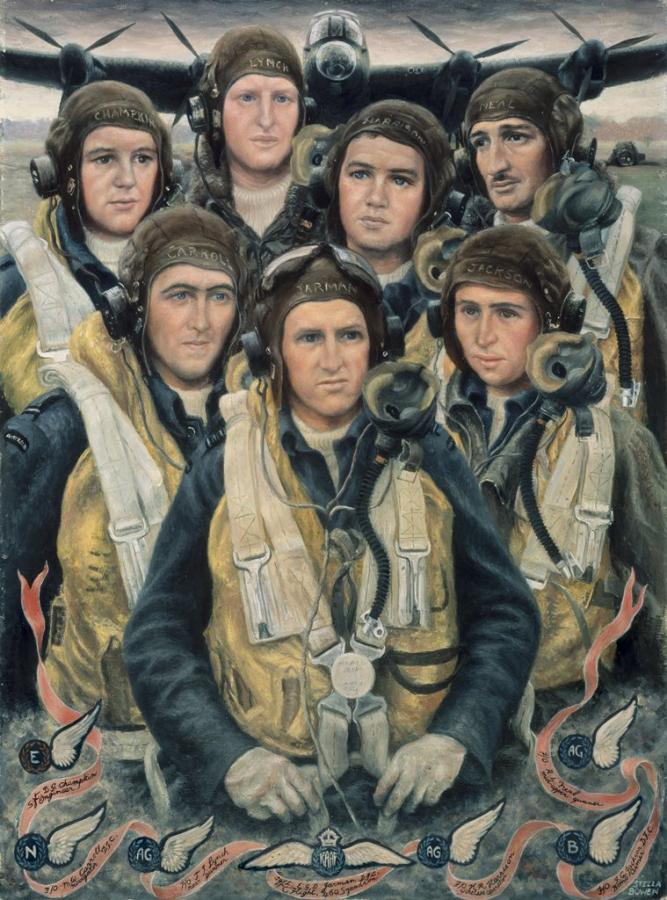
Bomber Crew (1944)

The Second World War brought a new chapter in Bowen's career. In 1944, she was the second woman appointed an official war artist by the Australian War Memorial. Theaden Brocklebank, a producer with the Pacific service of the BBC and wife of Keith Hancock, had arranged for Stella Bowen to record regular talks for Australian audiences about her wartime experiences. These talks provided Bowen with additional income during a difficult time and they resulted in the offer of the position of war artist.

One of the early women artists to be appointed, Bowen's brief as a war artist was to depict the activities of the Royal Australian Air Force (RAAF) stationed in England. She also painted portraits of military commanders and Australian prisoners of war who had recently been repatriated from Europe. In 1946, the Australian Government commissioned Bowen, Colin Colahan and Lt. Geoffrey Richard Mainwaring, to paint views of the Victory Parade and celebrations in London for the Australian War Memorial Board.

Bowen completed her last painting in 1947. She died later that year of breast and liver cancer, having never returned to Australia.

== Collections ==
Two portraits by Bowen are held by the National Portrait Gallery in London, those of George Douglas Howard Cole and Dame Margaret Isabel Cole.

Her portrait of Ramon Guthrie done in Paris in the 1920s is in the collection of the Hood Museum of Art of Dartmouth College in New Hampshire, US.

A painting of Admiral Sir Ragnar Colvin painted in 1944 is held by the Australian War Memorial. Bowen has 46 oil paintings and pencil drawings held in the Australian War Memorial.

== Exhibitions ==
Group shows include:

- Stella Bowen: Art, Love & War. Australian War Memorial touring exhibition, 15 March 2002 to 18 February 2004
- Dangerously Modern: Australian Women Artists in Europe 1890-1940. Art Gallery of South Australia, 24 May to 7 September 2025

== Publications ==
Drawn from Life : A Memoir (1940) (reprinted Pan Macmillan, 1999, ISBN 0-330-36164-3)

== Stella Bowen Park ==
Stella Bowen Park is located within Park 26 of the Adelaide Park Lands between the Adelaide Oval and North Adelaide.
