= Lou B. ("Bink") Noll =

American poet (1927–1986)

Bink Noll
- Born: Lou Barker Noll; April 15, 1927; Orange, New Jersey, U.S.
- Died: November 9, 1986 (aged 59); Beloit, Wisconsin, U.S.
- Occupations: Author; poet; professor
- Writing career
- Notable awards: National Endowment for the Arts; 1974

Bink Noll (April 15, 1927 – November 9, 1986) was an American poet, one of a notable group of poets who graduated from Princeton University in the 1940s and early 1950s. At the time of his death, he was a professor of English at Beloit College in Wisconsin.

== Biography ==
Lou Barker Noll was born in Orange, New Jersey, on April 15, 1927. He was the son of Louis and Elsie Marie Barker Noll. Family members called him Bink, and the nickname became his preferred name, even professionally. He was a graduate of Carteret School in West Orange, New Jersey. Noll completed his bachelor's degree from Princeton University in 1948, after serving in the Merchant Marine from August 1945 to January 1947. In 1950, he earned his MA degree from Johns Hopkins University, where he studied with poet Karl Shapiro. In the same year, he married June Ely Banker, a graduate of Goucher College. He earned his PhD in English Literature from the University of Colorado Boulder in 1956. His dissertation focused on the lyrical achievement of Abraham Cowley.

After teaching at Beloit College in 1953–54, he taught for six years on the English faculty at Dartmouth College, where he also participated in a writing group led by Dilys Laing and sometimes attended by Richard Eberhart and Ned O'Gorman. Noll was a visiting fellow at Yaddo in 1958 and 1960. In 1960–61 he lectured on American language and literature at Zaragoza, Spain, on a Fulbright Fellowship. He returned to Beloit College in 1961 and was promoted to full professor in 1969. He received a National Endowment for the Arts (NEA) grant in 1974.

During his tenure at Beloit College, Noll was a resident fellow in creative writing at Princeton University in 1967-68 and poet-in-residence at Lawrence University in 1977. Noll helped to found the Wisconsin Poetry Circuit, and he served on the Wisconsin Public Radio Board of Directors.

Noll authored three volumes of poetry. His first book, The Center of the Circle was published by Harcourt, Brace & World in 1962. Already his poetry had appeared in leading periodicals, including The Atlantic Monthly, The Paris Review, The Kenyon Review, and The Nation. A second volume of verse, The Feast, followed in 1967. In 1968, he signed the "Writers and Editors War Tax Protest" pledge, vowing to refuse tax payments in protest against the Vietnam War. Noll's poem "Angel" appeared in the December 20, 1969, issue of The New Yorker.

During the following decade his career was interrupted by illness. His third book, The House, appeared in 1984. It is a mature performance by an accomplished poet. In The House the formality of his earlier style is softened, but a subtle awareness of sound still informs the verse. The poems explore the triumphs and tragedies of domestic life. In 2017, poet David R. Slavitt selected and introduced a retrospective volume of Bink Noll's poetry for Little Island Press's Memento series.

Bink Noll's papers, including correspondence and journals, reside in the Beloit College Archives. He corresponded with several notable literary figures of the twentieth century, including poets William Meredith, Richard Eberhart, George Garrett, Willard Thorp, Ned O'Gorman, and W. S. Merwin.

Noll appears on the spoken word album Poets for Peace, produced under the auspices of the United States Fellowship of Reconciliation. It records a group reading at New York's Town Hall on November 12, 1967. Notable readers and performers on the album include Robert Lowell, Anaïs Nin, and Arthur Miller.

American composer Burrill Phillips set Noll's words to music in "Song in a Winter Night: for soprano and piano" (1985).

Noll died at Beloit, Wisconsin, on November 9, 1986, after years of heart trouble following cancer treatment.

== Bibliography ==
Poetry

- The Center of the Circle (Harcourt, Brace & World 1962)
- The Feast (Harcourt, Brace & World 1967)
- The House: Poems (Louisiana State University Press 1984) ISBN 978-0-807-11197-0
- Selected Poems, David R. Slavitt, ed. (Little Island Press 2017) ISBN 978-0-993-50565-2
- Lunch on Omaha Beach

Poetry in anthologies

- Seven Princeton Poets: Louis Coxe, George Garrett, Theodore Holmes, Galway Kinnell, William Meredith, W. S. Merwin, and Bink Noll (The Princeton University Library Chronicle Special Issue, Volume XXV, Number 1, Autumn 1963)

Score

- Song in a winter night: for soprano and piano / words by Bink Noll; Burrill Phillips. (1985)
