= Robert Pauley =

American radio executive (1923–2009)

Robert Reinhold Pauley (October 17, 1923 – May 2, 2009) was an American radio broadcasting executive who served as president of the ABC Radio network during a period when it faced challenges from television as the most popular form of mass media.

== Biography ==
Pauley was born in New Canaan, Connecticut on October 17, 1923. During World War II, he served for three years in the United States Merchant Marine, attaining the rank of Lieutenant. Following the conclusion of his military service, he married Barbara Anne Cotton of Pound Ridge, NY, and attended Harvard Business School.

=== Radio ===
He worked for a local radio station selling advertising and later worked in that capacity at both the CBS Radio and NBC Radio networks in New York.

He was hired by ABC Radio in 1958 as a salesman, and was shortly appointed Eastern Sales Director. After dramatically improving ABC's sales performance, and proposing a plan for revival of the network to the ABC/Paramount corporate leadership, he was named as vice president of the Radio Network in 1960, and president one year later. ABC was last in the ratings among the four radio networks and the industry was facing dire competition from television. Upon his appointment, Pauley undertook a national tour of ABC's affiliate stations, created an affiliate advisory board (ABC's first), and revamped ABC's public service, sports, entertainment and news product including heavyweight championship boxing and Notre Dame football. ABC's exclusive coverage of the 1964 Cassius Clay versus Sonny Liston bout drew an estimated 75 million radio listeners, a record.

Pauley hired Howard Cosell in 1959, a then-little-known sports announcer who had offered a proposal for a weekly radio program. Pauley tried to rebuff Cosell by telling him that the network had no money to create a show but that he'd air the program if Cosell could get a sponsor, which Pauley assumed he would be unable to do. Cosell found a shirt company owned by a relative as a sponsor and Pauley followed thorough on his commitment, adding a show aired variously as Speaking of Sports, which was broadcast on the network for 30 years.

Pauley believed that radio's intimacy would always attract listeners and advertisers, and was able to increase advertising sales and add 100 stations to ABC's network. By 1967, ABC was the number one radio network with a more than 50% market share. He was forced out of his position in 1967 for reasons never made clear to him, but probably based on a decision to restructure the radio network under a system of group vice presidents (despite the fact that the network's income in the previous quarter had been its best ever).

=== Television ===
After leaving ABC, Pauley developed a plan to establish a fourth television network to offer news-only services to local stations nationwide. After one failed attempt, Independent Broadcasting, he created Television News Inc. (TVN) in 1973, with the goal of competing with the big three networks by offering an objective, bias-free product. TVN was financed by Joseph Coors. Roger Ailes, who later created Fox News Channel, was an employee. The network was terminated in 1975 when funding from Coors was withdrawn.

Pauley went on teach business and journalism at the University of South Carolina–Spartanburg, where he founded its journalism department as well as its first course in business ethics. He served there as a Distinguished Professor for 15 years. He died at age 85 on May 2, 2009 in New Haven, Connecticut due to heart and lung failure. His wife, Barbara, died in April 2014. He is survived by his three sons and a daughter.
