= S4N =

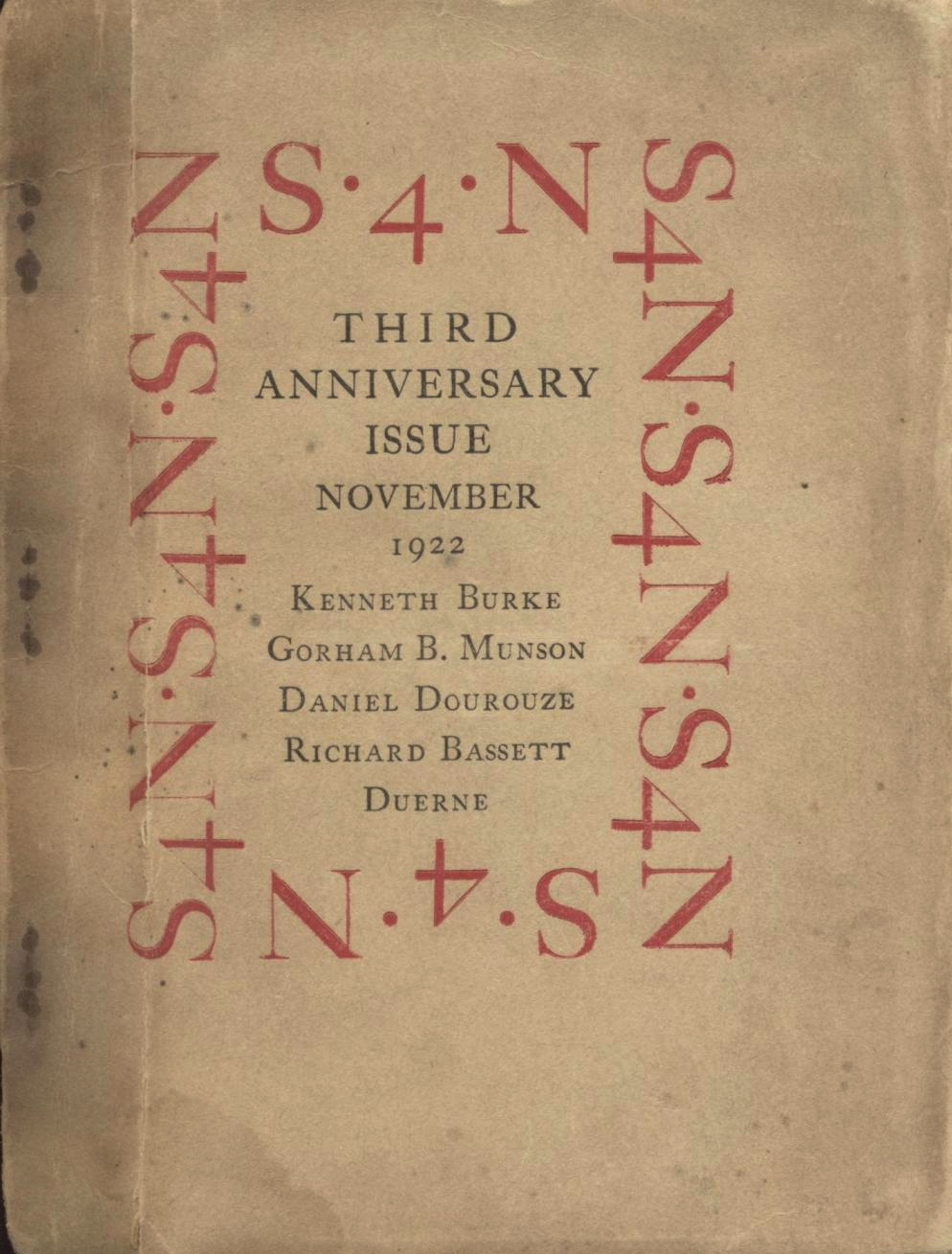
- Cover of the third anniversary issue
- Editor: Norman Fitts
- Frequency: Monthly
- Founded: 1919
- First issue: 1919
- Final issue Number: 1925; 33
- Country: United States
- Based in: Northampton, Massachusetts
- Language: English

S4N was an American "little magazine" that was published from 1919–1925 in Northampton, Massachusetts. In its earliest stages, editor-in-chief Norman Fitts described the magazine as a "discussion of the arts in a monthly magazine". The magazine published contemporary poetry and stories, as well as essays discussing the direction of Modernism in art and music. Among the notable poets, writers and literary theorists that were published in the magazine were Elsa Gidlow, E.E. Cummings, Hart Crane, Kenneth Burke, and Malcolm Cowley. In The Little Magazine: A History and Bibliography, Frederick J. Hoffman's authoritative work on little magazines, contends that S4N, along with Broom, Secession, and Seven Arts, were trend-setters and leaders of innovation.

== Background ==
The inspiration for the magazine's creation stemmed from a 1919 trip to Europe taken by Yale student Norman Fitts, Thornton Wilder, Stephen Vincent Benét, Ramon Guthrie, Roger Sessions, Quincy Porter, Richard Bassett, Arthur Dallin, John Carter, and William Hanway. The group wanted to re-create the literary vibrancy they experienced in Europe back in America in the form of a magazine. The first incarnation of the magazine saw the original 10 contributors form the S4N Society and become the sole contributors "for much of its early life". Norman Fitts was the editor, designer, and printer of the magazine.

== History ==
=== First issue ===
Fitts' "A STATEMENT OF IDEA", published in the first issue, explored the idea of the magazine as the group of friends being able to "benefit from exchange and cooperation" in the form of "writing an article, short or long story, in any form whatsoever, on any subject in which the writer is interested, and that he would type and circulate the collected contributions". This exchange of ideas between contributors fuelled the magazine's dedication "to controversy and contention" and push the boundaries of literary ideas through published content.

=== Name ===
S4N's name came about first as a stand in for a magazine title, as one had not been chosen by the publication of the first issue. Space for Title (Not Yet Decided), was put in place on the first issue, and by the fourth issue the S-4-N short form for Space for Name was agreed upon by the original contributors as a permanent moniker. Until October 1920 S-4-N was retained, whereupon the dashes were excluded and it became simply S4N.

=== Contributors ===
In its November 1923 issue, S4N published a poem by one of their most significant contributors, E.E.Cummings, titled "Poem, or Beauty Hurts Mr. Vinal". The publication of this work by Cummings, who was labelled by S4N as "the vulgarest of the newer younger generation … and besides, a knockout of a person" fostered an atmosphere of contention, as Harold Vinal, to whom the poem's title refers, was a regular poetry contributor to S4N. The poem was a satiric take on Vinals' dislike of "the harshness of expression" in the poetry of that time (Rumble 259). Contention between these contributors due to content, and the fact that a poem by Vinal was published "one short poem away from Cumming's own", exemplifies the atmosphere of controversy fostered within this literary magazine, both in content and aesthetic layout of the magazine itself.

=== Gorham Munson ===
The modernist ideas that inspired fierce debate within the magazine came from contributions of former Secession editor, Gorham Munson in particular. His appearance, along with other former Broom and Secession contributors, effectively changed the magazine's direction as a whole. Munson's idea of a "'Literary Secession' … [which can be defined as] a deviation into purely aesthetic concerns". was the defining idea that radicalized the magazine. Munson's authoritative first article, appearing in the November 1922 issue, was the biggest step S4N took in breaking away from literary tradition towards new ideas of literary modernism. In this same issue in which Munson's new ideas were revealed, other contributing articles show the animated debate surrounding Munson's ideas. As contributors weighed in as for or against, the broad range of responses culminated in a heated debate about the direction of the magazine. Although divisive discussions about Munson's ideas of modernism shaped the next few issues, by 1923 Munson had joined the editorial board of S4N, signifying if nothing else Fitts' approval of the new direction of the magazine. This division among American expatriates "proved far more important to [this] new generation … than either Eliot or Pound at that stage".

=== Cancellation ===
In S4N's final publication, Issue 33, which was published in 1925, Fitts outlined plans for a new version of S4N that would be international in distribution and content by publishing in various languages, would offer payment to contributors, and finally, would "give full reign to what Fitts termed 'Commedia dell'Arte' in which the weapon of 'aesthetic ridicule' would expose 'impromptu asininities, amusing contradictions in an individual'". These aspirations of a new S4N were based on the conditions that the magazine would 'cease as currently organized and funded ... [as] the magazine now owed $232.50 through late or non-payment of subscriptions. Fitts' goal was to amalgamate with another magazine by January 1926 and publish issues monthly, which resulted in one issue of Modern S4N Review, which was the result of combining with The Modern Review, a magazine also from Massachusetts. Backed by an Advisory Board with original S4N members Guthrie, Williams, and Wilder, and also the powerful Munson, the only two issues published "looked rather like S4N, 33 … and somewhat indeed like Broom and Secession, or a Secession 'in memorandum' and transposed to American soil". The cause of dissolution of this second edition of S4N is not entirely clear. Scholar Walker Rumble alludes to Fitts' print shop-contracted tuberculosis as ending his printing career and thus the unique aesthetics that made S4N. Others conclude that a plethora of personal problems for Fitts, and the idea that "that magazine had overreached itself", led to its closure. In the mid 1930s, Fitts moved on from printing and publishing and left Northampton for Washington.

== Aesthetics ==
S4N endured five different formats before its ultimate dissolution in 1925, many of these being the result of financial strain, a rather common scenario for little magazines at this time, as many were without independently wealthy backers to provide financial stability. Editor Norman Fitts felt strongly about both composition and typography, and his growing knowledge and creativity in both areas were reflected in the radically different formats the magazine endured over the 5-year period. As "editor, printer, and publisher combined, Fitts produced ten copies of the first seven numbers, published monthly with between nine and eleven mostly unnumbered pages". These first issues were somewhat juvenile, as Fitts experimented with publishing by way of a hectograph - 'which enabled him to duplicated single handwritten or typed sheets - as well as issues consisting of 'a mixture of typeset and typewritten articles ... held together by the humble but effective device of two metal fasteners'. Fitts was eventually allowed to use the Yale University Press for publication, and the typographic aesthetics used there were 'deeply conservative ... and guided S4N toward typographic traditionalism' Changes in format that followed included a black and white, one-sided single paged newspaper-esque layout, which then transformed into a 12-page pamphlet for financial reasons. S4N's transformation in 1922 was to be its last, and most remarkable. Starting with issue 19 and running for the remainder of the magazine's life, the magazine measured roughly 4x6 inches that typically ran 52 pages. Fitts' preference for page design with this format 'offered remarkably little space for text, necessitating extremely brief poems and stories". Alongside the page design, Fitts used 3 staples to bind the magazine and 'tipped the text block into a cover wrap." The result of this was its aesthetics becoming its distinctive feature and making it "distinctive among serials". Along with this, the last format made use of "combinations of cream, brown, yellow, and orange backgrounds, red lettering on its cover, and red, dark green, and blue for its inside titles of selective text". Photographs and drawings were reproduced in black and white, and the front cover was rearranged in varying styles with the title and contributors' names on the cover. This variation on a theme, in reference to the title page, exemplifies Fitts' unwavering dedication to creative formatting and constantly pushing for something new.

== Cultural significance ==
S4N, although not well known in comparison to other little magazines of its day, contributed significantly to the discussion of "the making of American cultural identity in the transitional years of the early 1920s". Its fostering of juxtaposing views on the future of the literary tradition allowed for important literary figures of the twentieth century to explore and cultivate their ideas and debate them within a scholarly context.
