= Visnews =

International news agency

Visnews was a London-based international news agency. It began as the British Commonwealth International Newsfilm Agency (BCINA), which was set up with help from The Rank Organisation when that company closed its cinema newsreel operation. The original headquarters in School Road, Acton, London NW10, had formerly been a Rank Laboratory. The founder shareholder broadcasters were the ABC (Australia), the BBC, CBC (Canada) CYBC (Cyprus) and NZBC (New Zealand).

Its main competitor for the early part of its existence was UPITN (later Worldwide Television News, WTN, which was taken over in 1998 by APTV, to form Associated Press Television News or APTN).

By 1992, Visnews was owned by NBC News (37.75%), the BBC (11%) and Reuters; Reuters bought out the others' shareholdings in the company that year. In 1993, it changed its name to Reuters Television and its operations were absorbed into Reuters' global operations.

Visnews was one of two major independent television news suppliers, the other being WTN. At its peak, Visnews supplied international news material to 400 broadcasters globally.

In its early days, distribution was mainly through shipped film and electronically via the Eurovision News Exchange. Later there were ad-hoc satellite news feeds, and in 1975 it started the world's first daily satellite news service, to the Australian broadcasters.

Visnews was also one of the first suppliers of news production to British Sky Broadcasting for its Sky News channel, commencing its contract in 1989.
