= Reese Schonfeld =

American journalist and executive (1931–2020)

- Born: Maurice Wolfe Schonfeld; November 5, 1931; Newark, New Jersey, U.S.
- Died: July 28, 2020 (aged 88); Manhattan, New York City, U.S.
- Education: Dartmouth College (BA); Columbia University (MA, JD)
- Occupation: Media executive
- Spouses: Karen Lamberti (m. 1959; div. 1970); Pat O'Gorman (m. 1978)
- Children: 6
- Relatives: Ned O'Gorman (brother-in-law)

Maurice Wolfe "Reese" Schonfeld (November 5, 1931 – July 28, 2020) was an American television journalist and executive. Trained as a lawyer, he co-founded CNN with Ted Turner in 1980, and went on to establish Food Network in 1993.

== Early life and education ==
Schonfeld was born in Newark, New Jersey, on November 5, 1931. He was of Jewish descent, the grandson of Yiddish-speaking immigrants. His father, Philip, worked as a partner in a glass-and-mirror company; his mother, Sarah (Wolfe), was a housewife, secretary, and bookkeeper. He got the nickname "Reese" as a result of his younger sister's mispronunciation of Maurice. He graduated from Weequahic High School. He went on study at Dartmouth College, obtaining a Bachelor of Arts in political science in 1953. He subsequently earned an M.A. and J.D. degrees from Columbia University. However, he never went into practice.

== Career ==
Schonfeld began his career with United Press Movietone News in 1956. Later he became vice president of United Press International Television News; when its U.S. business was purchased by Television News Inc. (TVN) in 1974, he joined that company for a year. In 1975, after TVN folded, he founded the Independent Television News Association, a service that provided independent television stations with pooled news coverage via satellite.

=== Birth of CNN ===
Ted Turner approached Schonfeld to find out about satellites. Schonfeld recalls Turner asking him how much a satellite would cost, and upon hearing the sum Turner exclaimed "only a million dollars a year?", after which Turner acquired his first satellite. Approximately a year later he was approached again by Turner, who wanted to found a 15-hour all-news channel. Schonfeld convinced Turner to increase to a 24-hour news channel. Schonfeld calculated it could be done with a staff of approximately 300 if they used an all-electronic newsroom and satellites for all transmissions. It would require an initial investment of $15–20 million and several million dollars per month to operate. In 1979, Turner sold his North Carolina station, WRET, to fund the transaction and established its headquarters in lower-cost, non-union Atlanta. Schonfeld was appointed first president and chief executive of the then-named Cable News Network (CNN). He hired Burt Reinhardt as vice president of the network; Sam Zelman as vice president of news and executive producer; Bill MacPhail as head of sports; Ted Kavanau as director of personnel; and Jim Kitchell, former general manager of news at NBC, as vice president of production and operations. While at CNN, Schonfeld is credited with originating the 24-hour cable news concept. In 1982, Schonfeld was succeeded as CEO by Ted Turner after a dispute over Schonfeld's firing of Sandi Freeman and was succeeded as president by CNN's executive vice president, Burt Reinhardt.

=== Post-CNN ===
After leaving CNN, Schonfeld joined Cablevision Systems in New York, where he developed and oversaw the first 24-hour all-news service on a local cable system, News 12 Long Island. He also produced People Magazine on TV for CBS, and assisted in developing "News Channel 8" for Allbritton Communications Company.

Schonfeld subsequently worked with Time Warner in planning the International Business Channel. He designed and implemented the Medical News Network, an interactive TV news service, for Whittle Communications in 1993. He also served on the board of Robert Halmi International before it was sold to Hallmark.

In 1992, Schonfeld began developing Food Network (originally the TV Food Network), which launched on November 23, 1993. He acted as president of the network, which was sold to Belo Broadcasting in 1996 and was later resold to the E. W. Scripps Company. Schonfeld sold his interest in Food Network to Scripps in 1999. He continued consulting for various media projects and occasionally contributed to The Huffington Post.

== Personal life ==
Schonfeld was married to Pat O'Gorman from 1978 to his death. O'Gorman was sister to poet Ned O'Gorman. Together they had one child— Juliette born in 1966, twelve days before the birth of his youngest child with Karen Lamberti his wife at the time. The marriage with Lamberti ended in divorce 4 years after the births of his two last children once the affair became known. Schonfeld had 5 children with Karen Lamberti between 1960 and 1966; Alexander, Ellen, Orrin, William, and Jennifer Ida. Schonfeld was the author of Me and Ted Against the World, an account of the development and early history of CNN, and "The Global Battle for Cultural Domination", an essay in Developing Cultures: Essays on Cultural Change.

Schonfeld died on July 28, 2020, at his home in Manhattan. He was 88 and had suffered from complications of Alzheimer's disease.

== Bibliography ==
- Me and Ted Against the World: The Unauthorized Story of the Founding of CNN , HarperCollins, 2001, ISBN 0-06-019746-3, ISBN 978-0-06-019746-9
- Developing Cultures, Essays on Cultural Change, Routledge, 2006, ISBN 0-415-95282-4, ISBN 978-0-415-95282-8
- "Shadow of a gunman", Columbia Journalism Review, 1975. (available to read here)
