= Richard Eberhart =

American poet (1904–2005)

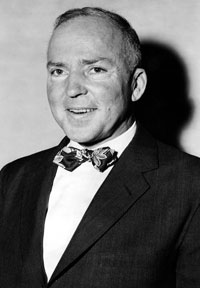
- Born: Richard Ghormley Eberhart; April 5, 1904; Austin, Minnesota, U.S.
- Died: June 9, 2005 (aged 101); Hanover, New Hampshire, U.S.
- Education: University of Minnesota; Dartmouth College (BA); St John's College, Cambridge; Harvard University
- Occupation: Poet
- Spouse: Helen Butcher (m. 1941)
- Writing career
- Notable awards: National Book Award; 1977; Pulitzer Prize; 1966

Richard Ghormley Eberhart (April 5, 1904 – June 9, 2005) was an American poet who published more than a dozen books of poetry and approximately twenty works in total. "Richard Eberhart emerged out of the 1930s as a modern stylist with romantic sensibilities." He won the Pulitzer Prize for Poetry for Selected Poems, 1930–1965 and the 1977 National Book Award for Poetry for Collected Poems, 1930–1976. He was the grandfather of Pittsburgh Pirates general manager Ben Cherington.

== Biography ==
=== Early years ===
Eberhart was born in 1904 in Austin, a small city in southeast Minnesota. He grew up on an estate of 40 acres (16 ha) called Burr Oaks, since partitioned into hundreds of residential lots. He published a volume of poetry called Burr Oaks in 1947, and many of his poems reflect his youth in rural America.

Eberhart began college at the University of Minnesota, but following his mother's death from cancer in 1921—the event which prompted him to begin writing poetry—he transferred to Dartmouth College. After graduation he worked as a ship's hand, among other jobs, then studied at St. John's College, Cambridge, where I.A. Richards encouraged him to continue writing poetry, and where he took a further degree. After serving as private tutor to the son of King Prajadhipok of Siam in 1931–1932, Eberhart pursued graduate study for a year at Harvard University. During his time at Harvard, Eberhart met and spoke with T. S. Eliot.

His first book of poetry, A Bravery of Earth, was published in London in 1930. It reflected his experiences in Cambridge and his experience as a ship's hand. Reading the Spirit, published in 1937, contains one of his best-known poems, "The Groundhog".

He taught for eight years at the St. Mark's School (1933–1941), where Robert Lowell was one of his students. Eberhart was instrumental in bringing English poet W. H. Auden to St. Mark's in May 1939. In 1941 he married Helen Butcher. They had two children.

During World War II he held the rank of Lieutenant Commander and served in the U.S. Naval Reserve; this experience led him to write another of his most celebrated poems, "The Fury of Aerial Bombardment", the first three stanzas of which, are in effect a prayer:

Was man made stupid to see his own stupidity?
Is God by definition indifferent, beyond us all?
Is the eternal truth man's fighting soul
Wherein the Beast ravens in its own avidity?

=== Career ===
In 1945, Eberhart published Poems: New and Selected, containing "The Fury of Aerial Bombardment" and other poems written during his service including "Dam Neck, Virginia" and "World War". He also edited War and the Poet: An Anthology of Poetry Expressing Man's Reactions to the Present claiming to be the first collection of poems based on war.

After the war, Eberhart worked for six years for his wife's family's floor wax company, the Butcher Polish Company. Burr Oaks was his first work published after the war in 1947 followed by Brotherhood of Men in 1949. In 1950 he was a founder of the Poets' Theatre in Cambridge, Massachusetts.

From the early 1950s until his retirement, he dedicated himself to writing poems and teaching at institutions of higher education, including the University of Washington, Brown University, Swarthmore College, Tufts University, Trinity College, University of Connecticut, Columbia University, University of Cincinnati, University of Florida, Wheaton College, St. Marks School, Princeton University and Dartmouth College. He taught for 30 years at Dartmouth as professor of English and poet-in-residence, where he was known for his encouragement of young poets.

Eberhart published Undercliff: Poems 1946–1953 containing Fragment of New York in 1953. Eberhart wrote a number of dramatic works in the 1950s and early 1960s which were performed regionally. These works included The Apparition, The Visionary Farms, Triptych, The Mad Musicians and Devils and Angels. In 1962, these works were published as Collected Verse Plays.

Eberhart was sent to San Francisco by The New York Times to report on the Beat poetry scene. Eberhart wrote a piece published in the September 2, 1956, New York Times Book Review entitled "West Coast Rhythms" that helped call national attention to the Beat Generation, and especially to Allen Ginsberg as the author of Howl, which he called "the most remarkable poem of the young group." Ginsberg credited Eberhart's article with "breaking the ice" for the Beats in regard to getting them published.

President Dwight Eisenhower appointed Eberhart a member of the Advisory Committee on the Arts for the National Cultural Centre in 1959. Also, Eberhart was Poet Laureate Consultant in Poetry to the Library of Congress for 1959–61 and was awarded a Bollingen Prize in 1962.

In her memoir, Poetic License, Eberhart's daughter Gretchen Cherington accused him of sexual abuse.

The Quarry: New Poems (1964) contained letters in verse to W. H. Auden and William Carlos Williams as well as elegies, lyrics, character sketches, and monologues. Selected Poems, 1930–1965 (1965) won the Pulitzer Prize. Collected Poems, 1930–1976 (1976) won the National Book Award in 1977. Eberhart was New Hampshire's Poet Laureate from 1979 to 1984 and was elected to the American Academy of Arts and Letters in 1982. He also won the Shelley Memorial Award, the Harriet Monroe Memorial Award, and the Frost Medal from the Poetry Society of America.

== Bibliography ==
- A Bravery of Earth 1930
- Reading the Spirit 1937
- Song and Idea 1942
- War and the Poet: An Anthology of Poetry Expressing Man's Attitudes to War from Ancient Times to the Present 1945
- Poems: New and Selected 1945
- Burr Oaks 1947
- The Oak 1957
- Brotherhood of Men 1949
- Undercliff: Poems 1946–1953 1953
- Great Praises 1957
- Collected Verse Plays 1962
- The Quarry: New Poems 1964
- Selected Poems, 1930–1965 (1965) winner of the Pulitzer Prize
- Thirty One Sonnets 1967
- Shifts of Being 1968
- Fields of Grace 1972
- Collected Poems, 1930–1976: including 43 new poems (1976) winner of the National Book Award
- The Long Reach: New and Uncollected Works 1948–1984 1984
- New and Selected Poems: 1930–1990 1990
