= Associated Press Television News =

Global video news agency

Associated Press Video, also referred to as AP Video and formerly as AP Television News (abbreviated APTN), is a global video news agency operated by The Associated Press (AP).

== About ==
AP Video is the video division of the Associated Press. It provides many of the world's broadcasters with a round-the-clock continuous feed of news, sports, entertainment and feature video content. Associated Press Television News Ltd. is a UK corporation owned and controlled by the Associated Press.

Headquartered in North London, AP Television News was founded in 1994 as Associated Press Television or APTV. They moved to their present headquarters in 1999 when APTV bought out competitor Worldwide Television News (WTN) and hired Roberto FE Soto as their first NYC Bureau Chief. The WTN building and facilities located at 1995 Broadway were deemed more suitable than the existing AP headquarters and Soto redesigned the newsroom, where APTN NY stayed until AP moved their operations to W 33 street in New York City, and later to 200 Liberty Street in New York City in 2017, where they remain.

Since its rebranding in 2005, the APTN name and logo was dropped in favour of "AP Television News", featuring the red AP logo of the Associated Press to emphasise its connection to the AP. As of 2023, the APTN abbreviation is not officially used, but many broadcasters still refer to the organisation as APTN.

== Services ==
AP distributes live and edited video to its clients (broadcasters, online publishers etc) around the world. Many major broadcasters and networks rely heavily upon The AP for major breaking news from around the world. The AP currently offers seven live video channels to its clients. The company also provides specialised broadcast services to clients, via its AP360 operation, such as editing, crewing or satellite feeds from news and sports events. Historical footage is also made available from its extensive film and video archives, which date back to 1895. It includes the film and video archives of onetime AP rival UPI's longtime newsfilm service United Press International Television News, which was the original agency that became WTN.

AP Video is based in North London (in a former gin warehouse on the Regent's Canal called "The Interchange" because its original function was to interchange freight between the canal and rail systems) with bureaus in 85 cities and 79 nations, including New York City, Washington D.C., Paris, Rome and Moscow; as well as current-event regions such as Iraq and Afghanistan. It uses fibre-optic and streaming to relay video footage to TV networks and newsrooms.

=== Use of video ===
Video news agencies such as AP, and its main competitors AFP TV and Reuters Video News, typically do not produce programmes that traditional TV owners could watch. Rather, they provide footage of an event with only natural sound and very loose editing. However, AP does also produce a range of entertainment and special interest programmes that are provided as white-label products for client use. Agency customers, who are online publishers, local and national TV stations, documentary producers, cable television news channels, and the like, edit the agency footage to suit their style, and add their own graphics and voice-overs before transmission.

The premise for a video news agency is simple: very few TV stations devote enough money to newsgathering to put hundreds of thousands of dollars' worth of camera, editing, and satellite transmission equipment everywhere that news might happen. Video news agencies provide rapid response coverage and international reach for those TV stations.

The agency obtains footage from their own camera crews, arrangements with local TV broadcasters to redistribute their material, material shot by freelancers who sell their footage to the agencies, and on occasion footage shot by the public (such as the famous footage of the 2000 crash of an Air France Concorde outside Paris and the hijacked Ethiopian Airlines Flight 961, which ditched off the Comoro Islands in 1996) Footage shot with broadcast-quality cameras is preferred, but quality can sometimes come second to content or immediacy for an exclusive story.

The maintenance of a network of local bureaux by the agencies means that local staff with expert knowledge are on hand to capture footage in places where Western camera crews could be in danger. An example of this is the Kosovo War in Serbia during which most journalists left the country prior to the NATO bombing campaign. In addition, TV reporters who often do not have the budgets or expertise to carry with a full satellite uplink are able to use the local agency bureaux. AP has a department called "AP360" which specialises in providing on site production and transmission facilities either through the AP bureaux infrastructure or at breaking or set-piece news events. APTN managed to get a satellite dish and transmission gear into Banda Aceh, Indonesia, following the 2004 Indian Ocean earthquake before the region was closed to air traffic. This became just about the only live video feed point available for the world's media, and was used extensively by network reporters for transmitting their recorded reports, or going "live" on air into their news and bulletins.

Wherever viewers see the same footage on more than one news station, the chances are that it came either from or via a video news agency. There has been little published research into the work of television news agencies apart from a 2011 book which argues that through their agenda-setting role, they are an important, but mostly hidden, force shaping the global conversation about politics and international affairs.

=== Public relations services ===
APTN's corporate services division produces and distributes video news releases (VNRs), video-form press release designed for use on broadcast television, for businesses' public relations campaigns. APTN offers this service despite concern among journalists about some news broadcasters relying on VNR material for their news budgets instead of broadcasting their own original reporting.
