= United Press International Television News =

Television news agency

United Press International Television News, abbreviated as UPITN, was a television news agency operating from 1967 to 1985. It was the successor to earlier UPI television news film operations United Press Movietone and United Press International Newsfilm. It was at the forefront of international television newsgathering and had a vast network of foreign bureaus around the world with film crews capturing images of the events and people that defined the era.

United Press International Television News and Visnews were the two largest and most important television news agencies at the time.

In 1985, after UPI sold its interest, it was renamed Worldwide Television News, or WTN. In 1998 WTN was bought out by the 'Associated Press', to become Associated Press Television News.

== History ==
=== United Press Movietone ===
The agreement between United Press and Fox-Movietone to shoot newsfilm for television stations was announced on July 13, 1948. United Press Movietone, or UPMT, was pioneering in providing a dedicated newsfilm service to television stations in the United States. UPMT introduced crucial innovations and procedures that became intrinsic to the business of motion picture newsgathering for television. UPMT grew steadily and became the first television news agency to operate on a truly international level with the BBC as its first European client. In 1958, an auxiliary service, originally called UPI Audio, was created to make newsmaker and reporter audio from the film service available to UPI radio clients.

=== United Press International Newsfilm ===
On 30 September 1963 UPI and Movietone ended their partnership. Movietone briefly stayed in the theatrical newsreel field while UPI set up a new corporate entity, UPI-Newsfilm (UPIN), with headquarters in London and New York. UPIN took on staff cameramen around the world, very often former Movietone staff, now on the UPI payroll. The client list continued to expand as new stations around the world commenced broadcasting.

=== United Press International Television News / UPITN ===
UPI, having broken away from Movietone, believed it essential to team up with another major partner. The pressure to find a big client/partner increased when UPIN lost its BBC contract. ITN was the obvious choice, but it took four years before UPI actually joined with ITN to form UPITN in June 1967. The company entered its most prolific decade. UPI, however, was plagued by financial difficulties that had negative consequences for UPITN. In the early eighties, UPITN was acquired by ABC (the American Broadcasting Company) which shared ownership with ITN (London's Independent Television News). Australia's Nine Network owned 10% of the network, which was renamed Worldwide Television News (WTN). In the early nineties, ABC purchased another 30% of the company from ITN. The Disney Company acquired ABC in 1995 and in 1998, resold the company to Associated Press Television News (APTN).

=== Legacy Newsfilm ===
The copyright to the UPIN/UPITN archive is held by Associated Press Television News, which acquired WTN. It is managed through APTN's stock footage licensing division, AP Archive. Although the films themselves have been well preserved, the numerous pieces of text catalogue that accompanied them were scattered across various locations in the UK and US. The text catalogue is essential as it identifies what footage is held in each film can and without it, the archive has been virtually inaccessible since the day the films were first produced. Twenty-thousand film cans containing 3,500 hours of international news footage have been lying dormant for decades deep underground in the Central London bunker. AP Archive assembled a team of archival researchers to create a coherent online text database. The films themselves are being cleaned and restored by Éclair Laboratoires of Paris, and then transferred onto high definition videotape for use by professional producers.
