= WGRB =

- Chicago, Illinois; United States
- Broadcast area: Chicago metropolitan area
- Frequency: 1390 kHz
- Branding: Inspiration 1390

Programming
- Format: Urban gospel

Ownership
- Owner: iHeartMedia, Inc.; (iHM Licenses, LLC)
- Sister stations: WCHI-FM; WGCI-FM; WKSC-FM; WLIT-FM; WVAZ; WVON

History
- First air date: October 13, 1923
- Former call signs: WTAY (1923–25); WGES (1925–62); WYNR (1962–64); WNUS (1964–75); WVON (1975–83); WGCI (1983–2004)
- Call sign meaning: "Gospel Radio Blessings"

Technical information
- Licensing authority: FCC
- Facility ID: 51162
- Class: B
- Power: 5,000 watts
- Transmitter coordinates: 41°44′13.12″N 87°42′0.18″W

Links
- Public license information: Public file; LMS
- Webcast: Listen live (via iHeartRadio)
- Website: inspiration1390.iheart.com

WGRB (1390 kHz) is a commercial AM radio station in Chicago. It is owned by iHeartMedia and it airs an urban gospel format. On Sundays, the station broadcasts the services of several African-American churches in the area. The studios are at the Illinois Center complex on Michigan Avenue in Downtown Chicago.

WGRB transmits 5,000 watts, using a directional antenna with a four-tower array. The transmitter is off South Kedzie Avenue near West 87th Street in the city's southwest side.

== History ==
=== WTAY ===
The station signed on the air on October 13, 1923. The original call sign, WTAY, was randomly assigned from a sequential list of available call letters, and its city of license was Oak Park, Illinois. It was a shared time station, running 15 watts and operating on 1330 kHz on Tuesday, Thursday, and Saturday evenings. It was owned by a community newspaper called Oak Leaves.

On February 15, 1924, the station began broadcasting from the Oak Park Arms Hotel. Its frequency was changed to 1060 kHz and its power was increased to 500 watts.

=== WGES ===
On April 6, 1925, Coyne Electrical School purchased the station and changed its call sign to WGES, standing for Coyne's slogan, "World's Greatest Electrical School." Ray Kroc played piano live on the air at WGES's studios in the Oak Park Arms.

In the late 1920s, the station was purchased by J. Louis Guyon and moved to the Guyon Hotel on the West Side of Chicago. The station aired big band music from the nearby Guyon's Paradise Ballroom. It also broadcast African-American and foreign-language programming. In 1927, the station's frequency was changed from 940 kHz to 1210 kHz, and was changed to 1360 kHz the following year.

Gene T. Dyer purchased interest in the station in 1930, and in 1937 its studios were moved to 2400 W. Madison Street, where co-owned WSBC was located.

=== Move to 1390 AM ===
In March 1941, WGES moved to 1390 kHz as a result of the North American Regional Broadcasting Agreement (NARBA) and the following year its power was increased from 500 watts to 5,000 watts, moving its transmitter location from the roof of the Guyon Hotel to 86th and Kedzie in Chicago. In 1944 the Federal Communications Commission (FCC) ruled that radio station owners could only own one AM and FM station per market. Gene Dyer sold WGES to his brother, Dr. John Dyer and associates. WGES's studios were moved from 2400 West Madison to 2708 West Washington Boulevard.

In 1945, Al Benson began hosting a Sunday evening program on WGES, using his real name Arthur Leaner. The program featured a sermon delivered by Leaner, a pastor, and gospel music. After the station told Leaner he could not sell advertising on his religious program, he began hosting a secular show as "Al Benson", playing blues, jazz, and R&B. Over the years, more hours of African-American programming were added, with the addition of disk jockeys Richard Stamz, Ric Riccardo, Sam Evans, Herb Kent, Franklyn McCarthy, and Sid McCoy. WGES's foreign language programming was cut back to only four hours a day.

=== WYNR ===
In 1962, the station was sold to Gordon McLendon for $1 million, plus an additional $1 million for a non-compete agreement. McLendon eliminated all foreign language programming in favor of an all-black format. There were complaints to the FCC that the station had eliminated foreign-language programming. The FCC held a hearing to investigate the complaints at which some politicians testified.

The callsign changed to WYNR on September 1, 1962. The station was branded "Winner". Announcers included Big John Evans, Dick Kemp (The Wild Child), Luckey Cordell, Bruce Brown, Floyd Brown, and Yvonne Daniels. In 1963, the station's studios were moved to its transmitter site at 86th and Kedzie.

=== WNUS ===
On September 3, 1964, the station adopted an all-news format with the new call letters WNUS. In 1965, McLendon bought WFMQ (107.5 FM), changed its call sign to WNUS-FM and began to simulcast the all news format on the FM frequency.

In 1968, the station adopted a beautiful music format. In 1967, the station's studios were moved to Chicago's River North neighborhood.

=== WVON takes over 1390 ===
In 1975, Globetrotter Communications, owners of soul music station WVON, purchased WNUS-AM-FM from McLendon for $3,550,000, and moved WVON from its 1,000-watt signal on 1450 kHz to the 5,000-watt facility on 1390 kHz that had been occupied by WNUS. WVON retained the studios it had used on 1450 in South Lawndale.

WNUS-FM changed to a disco format later that year, with a change of call letters to WGCI-FM. In 1977, Combined Communications Corporation purchased Globetrotter Communications, and the following year Combined Communications merged with Gannett Co.

=== WGCI ===
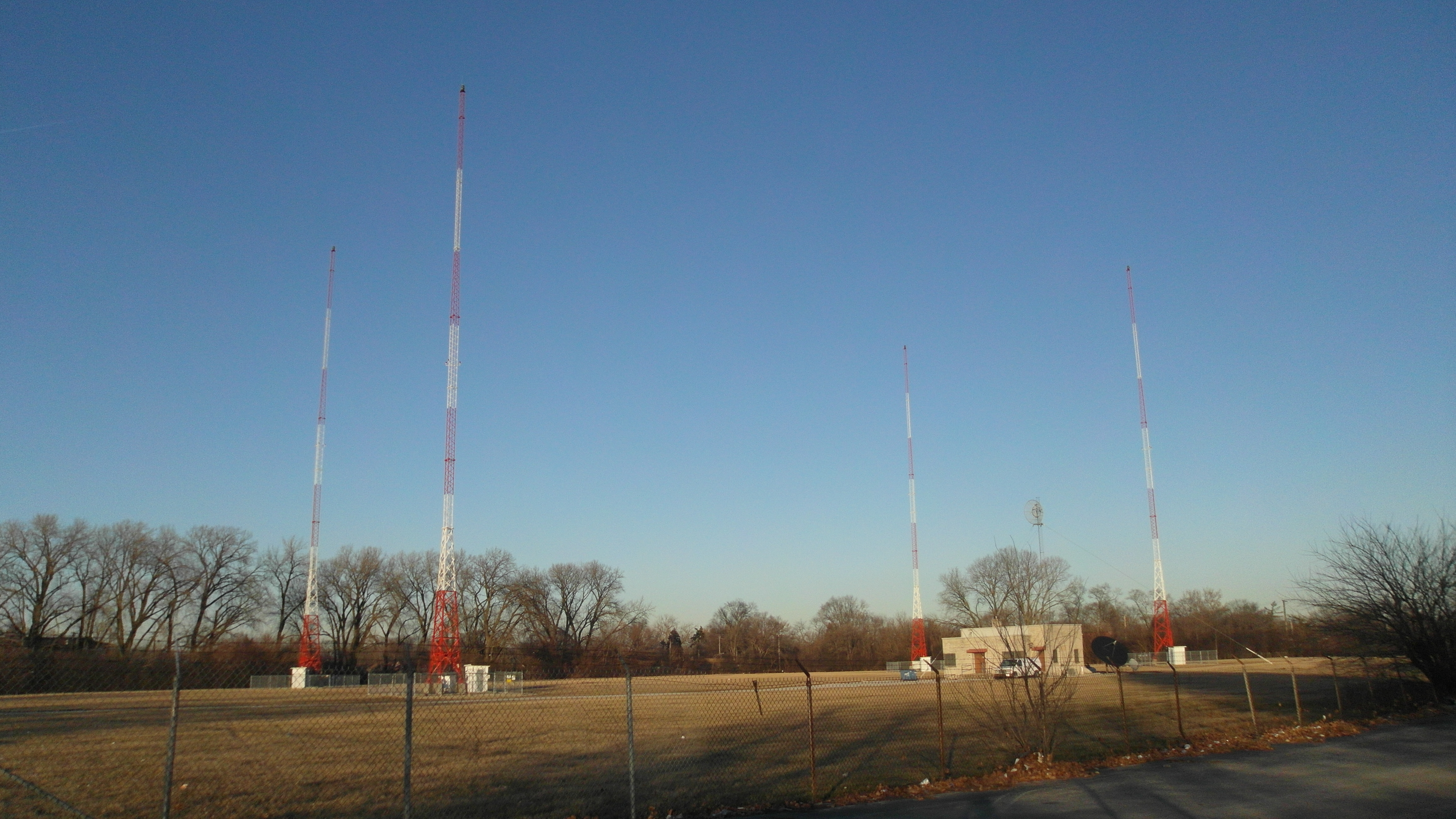
WGRB's transmitter site at 86th & Kedzie

On October 3, 1983, the station's call sign was changed to WGCI. The station aired an urban adult contemporary format. Yvonne Daniels hosted mornings. By 1986, the station was airing an urban contemporary format as part of a simulcast with 107.5 WGCI-FM.

On January 16, 1989, the AM station debuted an African-American-oriented talk format, while WGCI-FM continued to play urban contemporary music. The talk format was dropped September 10, 1990, and it adopted an urban oldies format branded "Dusty Radio".

=== WGRB ===
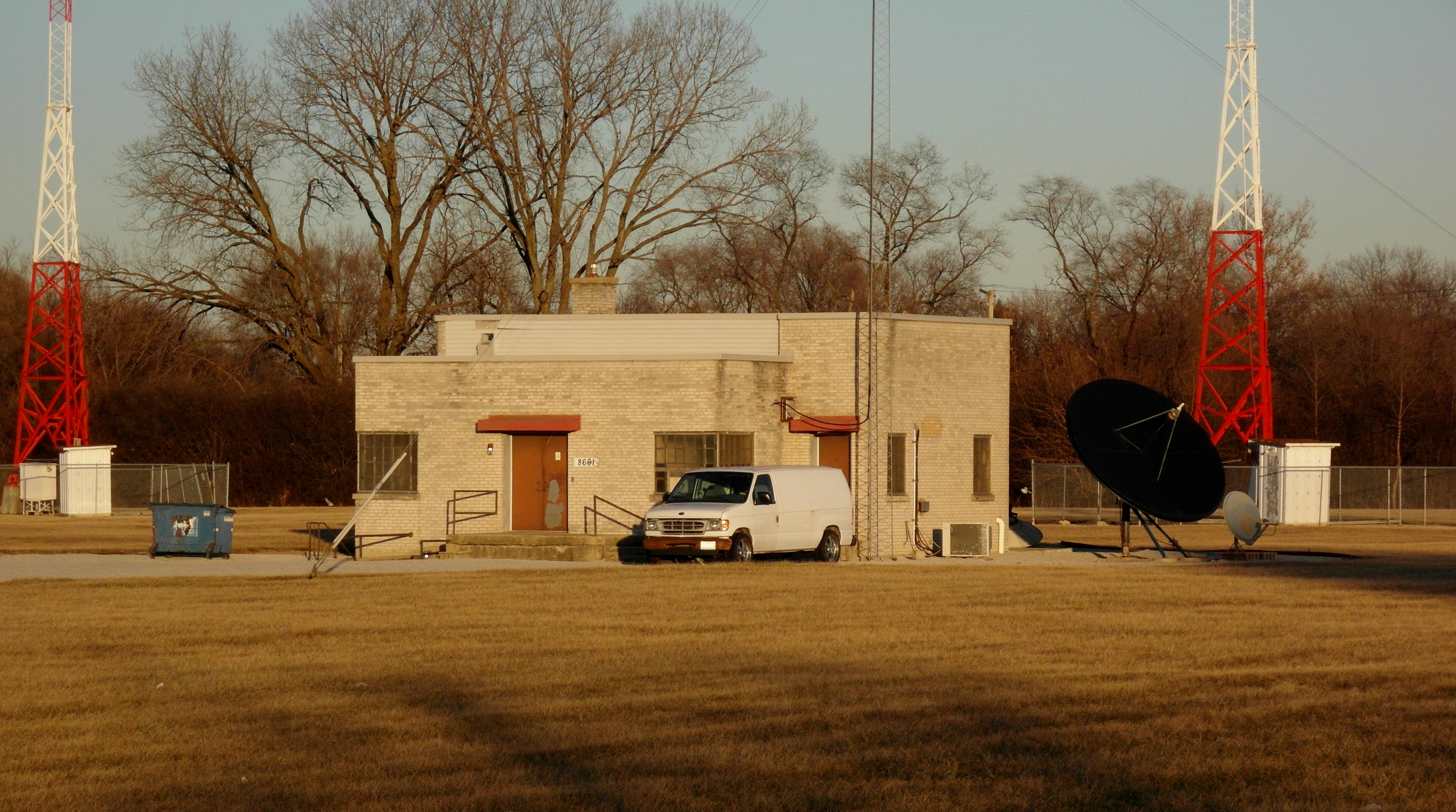
WGRB's transmitter building

The format changed to urban gospel music on October 5, 1998, under Chancellor Media ownership. Chancellor Media was merged into Clear Channel Communications in 2000.

The station's call letters were changed to WGRB on June 1, 2004, to differentiate it from its sister station, WGCI-FM. Clear Channel Communications changed its name to iHeartMedia in 2014.

== HD programming ==
WGRB was licensed to broadcast a hybrid signal (analog plus digital) on 1390 AM HD 1.
