= Oak Park Arms =

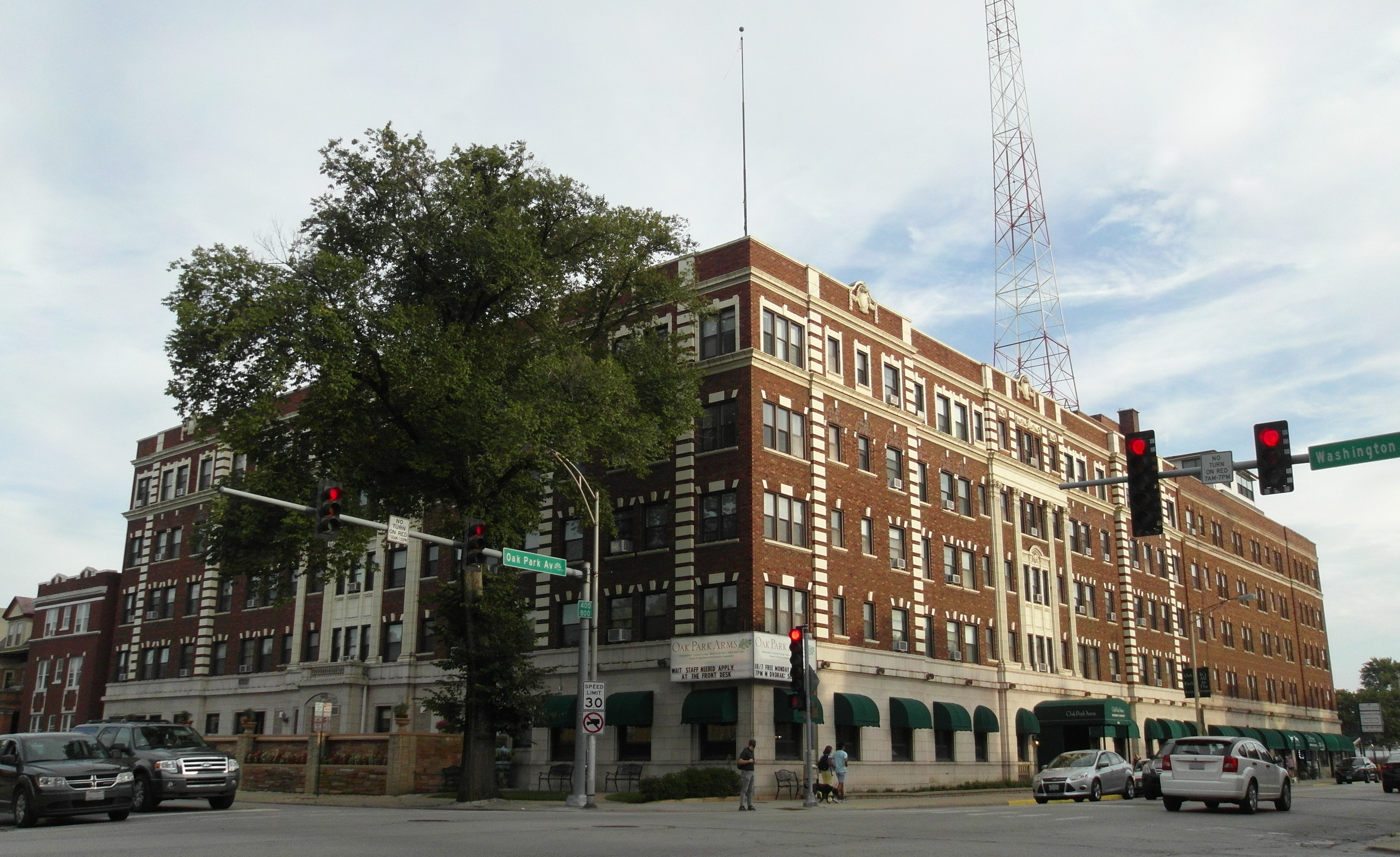
- Interactive map of the Oak Park Arms area

General information
- Location: 408 S. Oak Park Avenue, Oak Park, Illinois
- Coordinates: 41°52′52.1″N 87°47′38.2″W
- Completed: 1921
- Opened: April 20, 1922

Design and construction
- Architect: Roy F. France

The Oak Park Arms is a senior living retirement community focused on independent living for seniors located at 408 S. Oak Park Avenue, Oak Park, Illinois. More than ten other providers of senior-centered care maintain offices at the Oak Park Arms. Oak Park Adult Day Care, an adult daycare center, located inside the Oak Park Arms on the 5th floor, opened on January 7, 2013. Kindness Creators, an intergenerational daycare located inside of Oak Park Arms, opened on August 29, 2019.

== History ==
The Oak Park Arms was built in 1921 by George Cook and Arthur Lorenz at a cost of $750,000, and opened on April 20, 1922. The building was designed by Roy F. France. It was a luxury hotel and residence that hosted gala weddings and was host to notable guests, such as Eleanor Roosevelt. An addition was built on the south side of the building, which was completed in 1949. Joseph Glimco kept an apartment at the Oak Park Arms from 1955 to 1958. Blues guitarist Lurrie Bell lived at the Oak Park Arms in 2022.

In 1978, the Oak Park Arms was purchased and converted into a retirement community for seniors.

== Radio stations ==
The Oak Park Arms has been home to several radio stations throughout its history. On February 15, 1924, WTAY, owned by the Oak Leaves newspaper, began broadcasting from the Oak Park Arms. In 1925, the station was sold to Coyne Electrical School and its call sign was changed to WGES. In 1926, the station was moved out of the Oak Park Arms. Ray Kroc played piano live on the air at WGES's studios in the Oak Park Arms.

On October 7, 1950, AM 1490 WOPA began broadcasting, with its studios and transmitter located at the Oak Park Arms. The station continues to broadcast from the Oak Park Arms and is owned by Daniela Wojcik's CSWWII, LLC, holding the call sign WEUR.

Ten days after WOPA signed on, its sister station WOPA-FM (current-day urban AC iHeartMedia-owned station WVAZ 102.7) began broadcasting, with its studios and transmitter also located at the Oak Park Arms. In 1971, 102.7's transmitter was moved to the John Hancock Center.
