= Herb Kent =

Chicago–based radio personality (1928–2016)

- Born: October 5, 1928; Chicago, Illinois
- Died: October 22, 2016, age 88; Chicago, Illinois
- Education: Northwestern University
- Occupation: Disc Jockey
- Known for: His ultra-cool style and the longest career as a radio presenter/DJ.

Herbert Rogers Kent (October 5, 1928 – October 22, 2016) was "the longest-running DJ in the history of radio", a radio personality in Chicago, Illinois, for more than seven decades. As a high school student, Kent began hosting a classical music program for Chicago’s WBEZ. Over the years he “has served as an inspiration to a number of aspiring African-American broadcasters.” He was known as the "cool gent", a phrase that he coined to rhyme with his name.

== Early years ==
Kent was born Herbert Rogers Kent in Cook County Hospital in Chicago. An only child, he grew up in the Bronzeville neighborhood in Chicago. He attended Hyde Park High School and Northwestern University. He told a reporter in 2009 that as early as age 6 he "had a love affair with radio", as he enjoyed listening to a blues station at that age.

== Career ==
Members of Kent's radio audience usually felt as if they knew him personally, even though they might never have met him — a familiarity facilitated by "his lively exchange with guests and co-workers during his broadcasts".

Kent began working in radio in 1944 when he was 16 years old and still in high school, hosting a classical music program on WBEZ in Chicago. That assignment resulted from his acceptance into "highly competitive" workshops conducted by WBEZ.

By the late 1940s, he was working at two stations—acting in old-time radio dramas on WMAQ in Chicago and hosting a record program on WGRY in Gary, Indiana. He went on to work at WJFC-AM and WJOB-AM before reaching the role for which he became best known.

In the 1950s, Kent became known as "The King of the Dusties" for his development of the oldies format that he called "dusty records", a term he coined while working at WBEE radio in Harvey, Illinois.

In March 1963, Kent headed the disc jockey lineup at WVON, a newly launched Chicago station that resulted from the purchase of WHFC and a change in format to "uncompromising soul-style rhythm and blues." Kent, who was one of two disc jockeys retained from the WHFC staff, had the 7:30-11 p.m. program. Robert Pruter, in his book, Chicago Soul, noted that Kent had a distinct on-air style: "Unlike many other deejays of the day, black or white, he never shouted or screamed or used an artificial patter. He always talked in a conversational, ultra-cool style."

Hermene Hartman and David Smallwood, in their book, N'Digo Legacy Black Luxe 110: Media Edition, described WVON as "arguably the most popular Black radio station ever in America" and Kent as the station's most popular disc jockey at his peak. Gary Deeb, radio-TV critic for the Chicago Tribune, noted that Kent's popularity as a night-time disc jockey attracted an audience of young people who also listened to the station at other times.

In March 1977, Kent was fired from WVON. The station's owner blamed Kent's lack of energy, but Deeb wrote that the dismissal of Kent and other WVON personnel resulted from cost-cutting measures.

In 1978, Kent returned to Chicago radio with a 5-6 p.m. weekday program on WXFM. On that station he introduced his Stay Up and Punk Out show, where he would play new wave artists that black audiences were dancing to in clubs, like Devo and the B-52s. This show is considered influential on Chicago's House music scene. In the 1990s, he was heard on FM station WVAZ in Chicago. By October 1999, he had returned to WVON, but on the station's FM side.

In the mid-1960s, Kent owned the Times Square Club, a rhythm-and-blues venue that leased space in the Packinghouse Workers' Hall on South Wabash in Chicago.

=== Other professional activities ===
Kent was the host of Steppin' at Club 7, a dance program on WLS-TV in Chicago in the mid-1990s. The title came from Chicago stepping, a dance with which Kent was associated. He also taught courses in radio broadcasting part-time at Chicago State University.

== Civil Rights activities ==
Kent, who had been master of ceremonies for a Freedom Summer rally held by Martin Luther King Jr. At Soldier Field in Chicago, "was the voice on WVON calling for calm" after King's assassination. He reported from Chicago's streets during riots after King's killing.

== Death ==
On October 22, 2016, Kent died at age 88. He had done his final radio broadcast that morning.

== Contested estate ==
Robbin Kent, her father's only daughter, contested his will, which named his girlfriend, Linda Stanford, as executor. Robbin Kent said that because her father had dementia, Stanford "took advantage of him and ran amuck." Robbin Kent said that she and her son (Herb Kent's only grandchild) received nothing from the will.

== Autobiography ==
In 2009, The Cool Gent: The Nine Lives of Radio Legend Herb Kent was published by Lawrence Hill Books. David Smallwood was the book's co-author.

== Recognition ==
- In 1995, Kent was inducted into the National Radio Hall of Fame.
- In 2009, Kent was recognized by Guinness World Records for the "Longest career as a radio presenter/DJ (male)". A Guinness representative officially recognized him at a ceremony in Chicago.
- In 2015, Kent received the Chicago Crusader's Crusading Pioneer Award.
- In 2016, Kent received the Lifetime Achievement Award from The Chicago Defender and Real Times Media at the Men of Excellence Awards Dinner in Chicago.
