= WPNA =

WPNA may refer to:

- WPNA-FM, a radio station (103.1 FM) licensed to serve Niles, Illinois, United States
- WEUR, a radio station (1490 AM) licensed to serve Oak Park, Illinois, which held the call sign WPNA from 1987 to 2022
