= 1991 Chicago mayoral election =

- April 2, 1991
- Turnout: 45% ▼23.3 pp
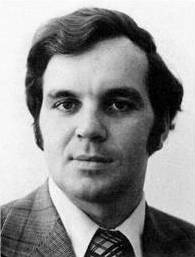

Nominee	Richard M. Daley	R. Eugene Pincham	George Gottleib
Party	Democratic	Harold Washington	Republican
Popular vote	450,581	160,302	23,421
Percentage	70.64%	25.13%	3.67%
- Ward results
Mayor before election
Richard M. Daley
Democratic
Elected Mayor
Richard M. Daley
Democratic

The Chicago mayoral election of 1991 resulted in the re-election of incumbent Democrat Richard M. Daley to his first full four-year term. Daley had previously been elected to serve the remainder of Harold Washington's unexpired term in a special election held following Washington's death in office.

Daley won by a landslide 44 point margin. His most significant opponent in general election was Harold Washington Party nominee R. Eugene Pincham. Other candidates were Republican candidate George Gottlieb and Socialist Workers Party nominee James Warren, both of whom performed poorly in the vote count.

The Democratic Party, Republican Party, and the Harold Washington Party all held primary elections for their nominations. Daley easily won the Democratic primary, receiving more than 63.01% of the vote and placing more than thirty-points ahead of the runner-up, then-Cook County commissioner Danny K. Davis. Former mayor Jane Byrne made a distant third-place finish in the Democratic primary, receiving less than 5.90% of the vote. In the Republican primary, which saw participation by a dismal 10,204 voters, George S. Gotlieb, a police sergeant, defeated candidate Alfred Walter Balciunas and radio executive Pervis Spann by a large double-digit margin. James R. Hutchison won the Harold Washington Party primary as a write-in candidate as a formality to secure the party ballot status in the general election. Afterwards, he stepped aside to allow the party's vice chairman, Illinois Appellate Court Judge Pincham, to become the party's nominee.

== Democratic primary ==
- Richard M. Daley, incumbent mayor since 1989
- Jane Byrne, former mayor (1979–1983)
- Danny Davis, member of the Cook County Board of Commissioners

Declined to run

The following individuals received speculation as prospective candidates, but did not run:

- Eugene Sawyer, former mayor (1987–1989)

=== Campaigning ===
Daley handily won the Democratic nomination, fending off challenges from then-county commissioner Danny K. Davis and former mayor Jane Byrne.

Daley announced on December 10, 1990, that he would seek reelection. The following day Daley held a fundraiser at the Hyatt Regency Chicago which raised more than a million dollars for his campaign. This, when added to his existing campaign funds, meant that by the third day of his candidacy he already had 2 million dollars in funding. Neither of his competitors could come anywhere remotely near him in fundraising. Daley –who had won a special election in 1989– was the strong frontrunner for the 1991 Democratic nomination. A poll conducted by the Chicago Sun-Times in November 1990 showed that 58% of Chicagoan's had positive views of his performance as mayor. A Southtown Economist poll conducted after his campaign announcement showed him with a 61% approval rating, and also showed him to be polling at a 2 to 1 margin over his closest challenger, Danny Davis. Daley benefited from a variety of factors, including solid voting blocs supporting his candidacy, his strong managerial style as mayor, and lack of public interest in local politics amid the Gulf War, which assisted Daley's hopes to have a low-profile campaign.

Davis and Byrne hoped they would be able to debate Daley. However, Daley declined to participate in any debates.

Davis had been selected as a "consensus" black candidate at a closed-door meeting held November 19, 1990 at the Hyde Park Hilton between 126 of Chicago's African-American leaders. They voted 66–60 to support Davis over a prospective run by former mayor Eugene Sawyer. While Davis had planned to campaign in all areas of the city, his funds were too limited to support a citywide campaign, requiring him to focus on select neighborhoods. Late in the primary, Tyrone Crider, the national executive director of Operation PUSH, characterized the Davis campaign as a "slow movement" because it had "failed to take the time necessary to meet and consult with the [black] religious and business community." Both Crider and PUSH founder Jesse Jackson became upset when Davis disparaged a number of black ministers that had supported Daley as being "Uncle Toms".

Byrne's campaign was hampered by her inability to raise funds. Her campaign was considered to be rather weak, and received no support from any significant community or business leaders. During her run, she argued that Chicago's, "deserved better leadership in City Hall". She attempted to provoke Daley into publicly feuding with her, but he did not take her bait. Chicago Sun-Times writer Steve Neal referred to Byrne as the Norma Desmond of Chicago politics, meaning that she was delusional in her belief that she could stage a comeback. In her 1991 campaign, Byrne was observed to be most comfortable when campaigning in the African-American community.

Perennial candidate Sheila A. Jones had also run in the previous two elections' Democratic primaries. She was a supporter of the LaRouche movement.

Daley was endorsed in the primary by the editorial board of the Chicago Tribune.

=== Results ===
Results map of the Democratic primary by ward

Black turnout was lower in the 1991 primary than it had been in the 1989 primary. Daley's share among black voters was ultimately higher than analysts had anticipated, with Daley securing double-digit support.

Due to the contest being overshadowed by the Gulf War, and due to voter apathy towards the election as a result of Daley's overwhelming lead in the polls, turnout was considered low, at under 48%. This was believed to have been among the lowest turnouts in fifty years for a mayoral primary in Chicago.

Daley set a new record for the largest margin of victory in a Democratic primary, surpassing the previous record (set by his father in 1975). Daley's performance in the primary was perceived as placing him an unbeatable position to win the general election, with Chicago being an overwhelmingly Democratic city, and the Democratic nomination being widely considered as tantamount to election. Even though he was likely to face a third-party African-American opponent, this was not seen as enough to prevent his victory (especially considering that, as a candidate, Davis had not been able to pose much of a challenge to Daley in the primary).

Democratic primary results
Party	Candidate	Votes	%
Democratic	Richard M. Daley (incumbent)	408,418	63.01
Democratic	Danny K. Davis	199,408	30.76
Democratic	Jane M. Byrne	38,216	5.90
Democratic	Sheila A. Jones	2,146	0.33
Total votes		648,188	

==== Results by ward ====
Daley won a majority of the vote in 31 wards and Davis won a majority of the vote in the remaining 19 wards.

Results by ward

Ward	Richard M. Daley		Danny K. Davis		Jane M. Byrne		Sheila A. Jones		Total
Ward	Votes	%	Votes	%	Votes	%	Votes	%	Votes
01	7,912	65.2%	3,366	27.8%	794	6.5%	55	0.5%	12,127
02	1,471	15.9%	6,950	75.3%	737	8.0%	74	0.8%	9,232
03	982	13.8%	5,484	77.0%	605	8.5%	49	0.7%	7,120
04	2,438	24.0%	7,126	70.0%	554	5.4%	58	0.6%	10,176
05	3,059	25.6%	8,319	69.7%	511	4.3%	50	0.4%	11,939
06	2,052	12.2%	13,917	82.5%	845	5.0%	58	0.3%	16,872
07	2,331	26.3%	5,922	66.9%	560	6.3%	36	0.4%	8,849
08	1,872	12.4%	12,465	82.6%	666	4.4%	87	0.6%	15,090
09	1,384	13.4%	8,269	80.3%	580	5.6%	59	0.6%	10,292
10	9,548	60.3%	4,043	25.5%	2,179	13.8%	56	0.4%	15,826
11	15,914	92.6%	875	5.1%	391	2.3%	10	0.1%	17,190
12	12,477	90.0%	729	5.3%	636	4.6%	25	0.2%	13,867
13	26,094	94.9%	226	0.8%	1,142	4.2%	20	0.1%	27,482
14	11,017	87.8%	973	7.8%	537	4.3%	25	0.2%	12,552
15	3,159	32.1%	6,031	61.3%	600	6.1%	49	0.5%	9,839
16	1,216	13.1%	7,233	77.8%	758	8.2%	91	1.0%	9,298
17	1,104	10.6%	8,599	82.6%	644	6.2%	58	0.6%	10,405
18	12,519	62.4%	6,455	32.2%	1,028	5.1%	49	0.2%	20,051
19	19,947	84.3%	2,492	10.5%	1,179	5.0%	32	0.1%	23,650
20	1,108	12.7%	6,980	79.7%	583	6.7%	85	1.0%	8,756
21	1,580	10.5%	12,638	84.1%	748	5.0%	64	0.4%	15,030
22	3,862	76.8%	685	13.6%	451	9.0%	29	0.6%	5,027
23	22,539	94.5%	170	0.7%	1,117	4.7%	25	0.1%	23,851
24	951	9.9%	7,948	83.2%	591	6.2%	68	0.7%	9,558
25	5,065	78.0%	901	13.9%	499	7.7%	25	0.4%	6,490
26	5,506	73.4%	1,306	17.4%	661	8.8%	33	0.4%	7,506
27	1,920	26.3%	4,782	65.4%	550	7.5%	59	0.8%	7,311
28	761	9.6%	6,716	84.5%	426	5.4%	45	0.6%	7,948
29	1,445	14.5%	7,858	78.8%	580	5.8%	85	0.9%	9,968
30	10,826	82.0%	1,592	12.1%	765	5.8%	24	0.2%	13,207
31	5,120	65.3%	1,865	23.8%	823	10.5%	30	0.4%	7,838
32	8,934	83.9%	994	9.3%	689	6.5%	28	0.3%	10,645
33	10,865	86.6%	789	6.3%	852	6.8%	39	0.3%	12,545
34	1,703	13.3%	10,339	80.9%	674	5.3%	64	0.5%	12,780
35	11,660	90.1%	437	3.4%	825	6.4%	23	0.2%	12,945
36	17,827	90.6%	676	3.4%	1,133	5.8%	35	0.2%	19,671
37	1,040	11.8%	7,214	82.0%	500	5.7%	42	0.5%	8,796
38	18,535	93.3%	226	1.1%	1,094	5.5%	18	0.1%	19,873
39	12,826	91.2%	427	3.0%	785	5.6%	28	0.2%	14,066
40	9,562	88.2%	653	6.0%	605	5.6%	24	0.2%	10,844
41	19,634	90.2%	323	1.5%	1,793	8.2%	23	0.1%	21,773
42	8,563	74.9%	2,026	17.7%	804	7.0%	36	0.3%	11,429
43	12,556	86.4%	1,316	9.1%	632	4.3%	33	0.2%	14,537
44	10,376	82.7%	1,539	12.3%	614	4.9%	21	0.2%	12,550
45	18,464	92.7%	302	1.5%	1,122	5.6%	26	0.1%	19,914
46	9,009	71.4%	2,699	21.4%	857	6.8%	52	0.4%	12,617
47	11,423	87.7%	915	7.0%	672	5.2%	20	0.2%	13,030
48	7,491	73.1%	2,111	20.6%	617	6.0%	33	0.3%	10,252
49	6,912	68.8%	2,509	25.0%	573	5.7%	55	0.5%	10,049
50	13,859	89.3%	998	6.4%	635	4.1%	33	0.2%	15,525
Totals	408,418	63.0%	199,408	30.8%	38,216	5.9%	2,146	0.3%	648,188

== Republican primary ==
George S. Gotlieb defeated Alfred Walter Balciunas and WVON executive Pervis Spann in the Republican primary . Gotlieb, a police sergeant, was not well-known. Gottlieb was endorsed in the primary by the editorial board of the Chicago Tribune.

Brette X. New had also been running initially, but withdrew.

=== Results ===
Republican primary results
Party	Candidate	Votes	%
Republican	George S. Gottlieb	4,942	48.4
Republican	Alfred Walter Balciunas	2,961	29.0
Republican	Pervis Spann	2,301	22.5
Total votes		10,204	

==== Results by ward ====
Results by ward

Ward	George S. Gottlieb		Alfred Walter Balciunas		Pervis Spann		Total
Ward	Votes	%	Votes	%	Votes	%	Votes
1	136	49.6%	76	27.7%	62	22.6%	274
2	20	9.7%	23	11.2%	163	79.1%	206
3	15	16.0%	15	16.0%	64	68.1%	94
4	28	27.5%	14	13.7%	60	58.8%	102
5	38	32.8%	24	20.7%	54	46.6%	116
6	25	17.7%	15	10.6%	101	71.6%	141
7	14	21.2%	15	22.7%	37	56.1%	66
8	14	12.0%	12	10.3%	91	77.8%	117
9	19	21.8%	13	14.9%	55	63.2%	87
10	216	46.7%	189	40.8%	58	12.5%	463
11	66	40.5%	69	42.3%	28	17.2%	163
12	74	38.3%	100	51.8%	19	9.8%	193
13	95	36.5%	147	56.5%	18	6.9%	260
14	44	26.0%	101	59.8%	24	14.2%	169
15	13	15.7%	31	37.3%	39	47.0%	83
16	5	6.7%	13	17.3%	57	76.0%	75
17	19	17.8%	13	12.1%	75	70.1%	107
18	60	31.9%	70	37.2%	58	30.9%	188
19	198	62.1%	88	27.6%	33	10.3%	319
20	17	15.3%	21	18.9%	73	65.8%	111
21	18	15.1%	9	7.6%	92	77.3%	119
22	39	47.0%	33	39.8%	11	13.3%	83
23	109	40.8%	131	49.1%	27	10.1%	267
24	24	26.1%	15	16.3%	53	57.6%	92
25	33	40.2%	35	42.7%	14	17.1%	82
26	50	44.6%	35	31.2%	27	24.1%	112
27	38	39.6%	22	22.9%	36	37.5%	96
28	17	23.6%	16	22.2%	39	54.2%	72
29	22	28.9%	17	22.4%	37	48.7%	76
30	126	58.6%	67	31.2%	22	10.2%	215
31	54	37.5%	58	40.3%	32	22.2%	144
32	77	48.4%	59	37.1%	23	14.5%	159
33	76	46.1%	62	37.6%	27	16.4%	165
34	10	9.7%	16	15.5%	77	74.8%	103
35	209	68.1%	65	21.2%	33	10.7%	307
36	194	62.2%	92	29.5%	26	8.3%	312
37	27	33.8%	13	16.2%	40	50.0%	80
38	241	64.8%	105	28.2%	26	7.0%	372
39	150	59.3%	75	29.6%	28	11.1%	253
40	141	57.6%	80	32.7%	24	9.8%	245
41	372	67.8%	122	22.2%	55	10.0%	549
42	237	56.4%	115	27.4%	68	16.2%	420
43	253	63.9%	90	22.7%	53	13.4%	396
44	206	62.6%	80	24.3%	43	13.1%	329
45	284	73.0%	74	19.0%	31	8.0%	389
46	184	55.8%	106	32.1%	40	12.1%	330
47	143	60.1%	68	28.6%	27	11.3%	238
48	214	55.4%	117	30.3%	55	14.2%	386
49	121	53.1%	71	31.1%	36	15.8%	228
50	157	62.5%	64	25.5%	30	12.0%	251
Totals	4,942	48.4%	2,961	29.0%	2,301	22.5%	10,204

== Harold Washington Party primary ==
James R. Hutchinson, who won the party primary, withdrew after winning, stepping aside for R. Eugene Pincham to assume the nomination. Hutchison was the vice-chairman of the Harold Washington Party.

When he won the nomination, Hutchinson ran for mayor in the party's primary as a write-in candidate so that the party could have a mayoral candidate, thus ensuring that the party would maintain its place on the ballot in the general election, as Illinois law required parties to run full-slates. His strategy was to win enough write-in votes to secure the party's nomination as a write-in, but not to take too many voters away from the Democratic primary in fears of otherwise hurting Davis` chances against Daley. Danny K. Davis had been in November 1991 by black leaders as a consensus African-American candidate to challenge Daley for mayor in the Democratic primary, and was backed by the Harold Washington Party during his Democratic primary campaign. Hutchinson stated before the Democratic primary that if Davis did not beat Daley, Hutchison would immediately withdraw from the Washington Party ticket to allow a stronger candidate to run in the general election with assurances from Davis that he would support such a candidate. After Davis lost to Daley in the Democratic primary, Hutchison kept his promise, stepped aside, and allowed Pincham to be the Harold Washington Party candidate for mayor. Pincham was a former appellate judge who had left the Democratic Party after losing its 1990 nomination for Cook County Board President to Richard Phelan.

== Socialist Workers nomination ==
The Socialist Workers Party nominated 1988 presidential candidate James Warren.

== General election ==
Having no significant general election opponents, Daley's campaign activity was relatively minimal. He utilized strong field operations in the city's wards and distributed issue briefing papers.

Daley declined to participate in any debates.

=== Results ===
Daley won by a large margin.

Daley received roughly 25% of the African-American vote.

Mayor of Chicago 1991 (general election)
Party	Candidate	Votes	%
Democratic	Richard M. Daley	450,581	70.64
Harold Washington	R. Eugene Pincham	160,302	25.13
Republican	George S. Gottlieb	23,421	3.67
Socialist Workers	James Warren	3,581	0.56
Turnout		637,885	

Daley won a majority in 31 of the city's wards, with Pincham winning a majority in the remaining 19 wards.

Results by ward

Ward	Richard M. Daley (Democratic Party)		R. Eugene Pincham (Harold Washington Party)		George S. Gottlieb (Republican Party)		James Warren (Socialist Workers Party)		Under votes		Over votes		Total
Ward	Votes	%	Votes	%	Votes	%	Votes	%	Votes	%	Votes	%	Votes
1	8,424	70.6%	2,604	21.8%	387	3.2%	73	0.6%	263	2.2%	177	1.5%	11,928
2	2,321	29.0%	5,044	63.1%	148	1.9%	47	0.6%	240	3.0%	193	2.4%	7,993
3	1,544	24.3%	4,257	67.1%	83	1.3%	43	0.7%	191	3.0%	228	3.6%	6,346
4	4,086	34.7%	6,366	54.0%	249	2.1%	177	1.5%	754	6.4%	156	1.3%	11,788
5	3,581	34.2%	6,086	58.2%	241	2.3%	94	0.9%	346	3.3%	118	1.1%	10,466
6	3,402	21.8%	11,342	72.8%	159	1.0%	37	0.2%	404	2.6%	242	1.6%	15,586
7	2,715	35.7%	4,517	59.3%	114	1.5%	30	0.4%	166	2.2%	72	0.9%	7,614
8	3,050	22.7%	9,627	71.5%	162	1.2%	36	0.3%	438	3.3%	145	1.1%	13,458
9	2,301	21.8%	7,526	71.3%	120	1.1%	43	0.4%	449	4.3%	123	1.2%	10,562
10	12,055	65.4%	3,626	19.7%	1,743	9.5%	78	0.4%	842	4.6%	84	0.5%	18,428
11	16,795	92.1%	758	4.2%	238	1.3%	20	0.1%	310	1.7%	108	0.6%	18,229
12	12,715	90.3%	586	4.2%	440	3.1%	26	0.2%	228	1.6%	83	0.6%	14,078
13	27,321	94.9%	140	0.5%	894	3.1%	32	0.1%	334	1.2%	54	0.2%	28,775
14	11,920	88.7%	884	6.6%	308	2.3%	27	0.2%	242	1.8%	62	0.5%	13,443
15	4,066	39.6%	5,514	53.7%	118	1.1%	55	0.5%	382	3.7%	134	1.3%	10,269
16	2,264	22.5%	6,819	67.7%	92	0.9%	59	0.6%	656	6.5%	181	1.8%	10,071
17	1,954	19.8%	7,197	72.9%	105	1.1%	45	0.5%	318	3.2%	260	2.6%	9,879
18	13,795	66.7%	5,558	26.9%	616	3.0%	46	0.2%	553	2.7%	106	0.5%	20,674
19	19,890	85.9%	1,863	8.0%	968	4.2%	48	0.2%	349	1.5%	43	0.2%	23,161
20	2,141	23.6%	6,093	67.2%	132	1.5%	51	0.6%	467	5.1%	189	2.1%	9,073
21	2,616	19.1%	10,295	75.3%	114	0.8%	52	0.4%	375	2.7%	221	1.6%	13,673
22	3,053	81.0%	408	10.8%	92	2.4%	28	0.7%	131	3.5%	56	1.5%	3,768
23	23,914	93.9%	93	0.4%	926	3.6%	29	0.1%	456	1.8%	56	0.2%	25,474
24	2,125	20.1%	7,239	68.5%	103	1.0%	84	0.8%	745	7.1%	267	2.5%	10,563
25	6,004	76.6%	865	11.0%	207	2.6%	46	0.6%	649	8.3%	64	0.8%	7,835
26	5,238	79.5%	741	11.2%	213	3.2%	69	1.0%	258	3.9%	71	1.1%	6,590
27	2,928	37.4%	4,028	51.4%	123	1.6%	70	0.9%	480	6.1%	201	2.6%	7,830
28	1,302	18.9%	5,045	73.3%	67	1.0%	50	0.7%	184	2.7%	232	3.4%	6,880
29	2,532	26.3%	6,343	66.0%	141	1.5%	53	0.6%	394	4.1%	153	1.6%	9,616
30	10,145	84.7%	1,054	8.8%	456	3.8%	33	0.3%	200	1.7%	93	0.8%	11,981
31	6,513	69.4%	1,545	16.5%	226	2.4%	80	0.9%	929	9.9%	88	0.9%	9,381
32	9,095	87.4%	543	5.2%	303	2.9%	84	0.8%	284	2.7%	102	1.0%	10,411
33	11,060	88.7%	497	4.0%	451	3.6%	80	0.6%	292	2.3%	84	0.7%	12,464
34	2,767	23.7%	8,305	71.3%	109	0.9%	50	0.4%	229	2.0%	196	1.7%	11,656
35	12,365	90.1%	207	1.5%	735	5.4%	65	0.5%	284	2.1%	62	0.5%	13,718
36	18,292	91.5%	448	2.2%	871	4.4%	39	0.2%	261	1.3%	91	0.5%	20,002
37	2,083	23.7%	6,028	68.4%	87	1.0%	60	0.7%	372	4.2%	177	2.0%	8,807
38	20,794	91.6%	150	0.7%	1,278	5.6%	49	0.2%	378	1.7%	59	0.3%	22,708
39	13,331	91.2%	207	1.4%	773	5.3%	42	0.3%	213	1.5%	57	0.4%	14,623
40	9,494	88.7%	293	2.7%	573	5.4%	76	0.7%	213	2.0%	53	0.5%	10,702
41	23,642	89.1%	211	0.8%	2,124	8.0%	25	0.1%	471	1.8%	68	0.3%	26,541
42	9,919	79.1%	1,525	12.2%	655	5.2%	70	0.6%	269	2.1%	101	0.8%	12,539
43	11,391	87.8%	587	4.5%	640	4.9%	104	0.8%	213	1.6%	34	0.3%	12,969
44	9,947	87.0%	525	4.6%	544	4.8%	158	1.4%	236	2.1%	28	0.2%	11,438
45	19,073	91.6%	167	0.8%	1,224	5.9%	48	0.2%	259	1.2%	60	0.3%	20,831
46	12,062	71.0%	2,691	15.8%	746	4.4%	287	1.7%	1,128	6.6%	70	0.4%	16,984
47	12,548	89.6%	392	2.8%	595	4.2%	149	1.1%	271	1.9%	54	0.4%	14,009
48	8,070	77.5%	1,356	13.0%	555	5.3%	116	1.1%	246	2.4%	64	0.6%	10,407
49	8,560	73.0%	1,689	14.4%	583	5.0%	333	2.8%	522	4.4%	47	0.4%	11,734
50	13,378	90.1%	418	2.8%	590	4.0%	85	0.6%	285	1.9%	87	0.6%	14,843
Totals	450,581	68.0%	160,302	24.2%	23,421	3.5%	3,581	0.5%	19,159	2.9%	5,754	0.9%	662,798
