= WVAZ =

Radio station in Chicago, Illinois

- Oak Park, Illinois; United States
- Broadcast area: Chicago metropolitan area; Northwest Indiana
- Frequency: 102.7 MHz (HD Radio)
- Branding: V103

Programming
- Language: English
- Format: Urban adult contemporary
- Subchannels: HD2: Black Information Network
- Affiliations: Premiere Networks

Ownership
- Owner: iHeartMedia, Inc.; (iHM Licenses, LLC)
- Sister stations: WCHI-FM; WGCI-FM; WGRB; WKSC-FM; WLIT-FM; WVON

History
- First air date: October 17, 1950
- Former call signs: WOPA-FM (1950–69); WGLD (1969–74); WBMX (1974–84); WBMX-FM (1984–88)
- Former frequencies: 102.3 MHz (1950–58)
- Call sign meaning: Slogan of "Variety from A to Z"

Technical information
- Licensing authority: FCC
- Facility ID: 6588
- Class: B
- ERP: 3,800 watts (analog); 38 watts (digital)
- HAAT: 425 meters (1,394 ft)
- Transmitter coordinates: 41.899°N 87.623°W

Links
- Public license information: Public file; LMS
- Webcast: Listen live (via iHeartRadio)
- Website: v103.iheart.com

WVAZ (102.7 FM, "V103") is an urban adult contemporary radio station serving the Chicago metropolitan area and Northwest Indiana. Licensed to Oak Park, Illinois, WVAZ is owned by iHeartMedia, Inc.. WVAZ carries the nationally syndicated Steve Harvey Morning Show and The Sweat Hotel with Keith Sweat.

WVAZ's radio studios and offices are located at the Illinois Center complex on Michigan Avenue in Downtown Chicago. It broadcasts from a transmitter atop the John Hancock Center. In 2005, WVAZ began broadcasting in IBOC digital radio, using the HD Radio system from iBiquity. Its HD2 digital subchannel carries the Black Information Network.

== History ==
=== WOPA-FM ===
The station began broadcasting October 17, 1950 and held the call sign WOPA-FM. It was a sister station to WOPA 1490, the present-day WEUR. The call letters WOPA stood for the Oak Park Arms, a hotel on Oak Park Avenue where the station's studios and transmitter were located. The station originally broadcast at 102.3 MHz, and had an ERP of 1,000 watts at a HAAT of 250 feet. In 1958, the station's frequency was changed to 102.7 MHz, and its ERP and HAAT were increased to 3,550 watts and 260 feet respectively.

Pervis Spann began his radio career on WOPA in 1959.

In 1962, the station's ERP was increased to 8,100 watts, while its HAAT was decreased to 231 feet. In 1965 its ERP was increased to 17,000 watts, and in 1967 its ERP was increased to 50,000 watts.

On May 21, 1967, WOPA-FM began airing progressive rock Sunday nights. On March 4, 1968, the station began airing a two and a half hour nightly progressive rock program titled "Rock Garden". Another overnight progressive rock program was added in October 1968.

=== WGLD ===
In May 1969, the station's call sign was changed to WGLD. The station adopted an oldies format. On January 5, 1970, the station switched to a full time progressive rock format.

In 1972, the station's transmitter was moved to the John Hancock Center, and its ERP was reduced to 6,000 watts.

In 1973, the station aired a sex talk show hosted by Morgan Moore called Femme Forum, weekdays from 10 a.m. to 3 p.m. The Federal Communications Commission fined the station $2,000 for an episode which dealt with the subject of oral sex, and stated that the show's "titillating, pandering fashion" of the episode's discussions constituted "broadcast obscenity". The station's owner, Sonderling Broadcasting, did not appeal the ruling. Femme Forum was dropped from the station shortly thereafter and the station returned to airing an oldies format.

=== WBMX ===
In 1974, the station's call sign was changed to WBMX, standing for "Black Music EXperience", and the station adopted an urban contemporary format. The station continued airing an urban contemporary format into the late 1980s.

During this era the station helped give rise to a new generation of DJs whose formats brought dance music to Chicago's airwaves. The Hot Mix 5 went on to help define what became known as Chicago House music.

In 1988, the station was sold to Sky Broadcasting for $27 million. Sky Broadcasting was taken over by Broadcasting Partners later that year.

=== WVAZ ===
At 5 p.m. on October 18, 1988, the station shifted to an urban adult contemporary format and the station was branded V103, with its call sign changing to WVAZ.

Broadcasting Partners was acquired by Evergreen Media in 1995, which in turn merged with Chancellor Broadcasting in 1997. Chancellor restructured as AMFM, Inc. in 1999, and in 2000 merged with Clear Channel Communications.

In March 2009, WVAZ replaced the Tom Joyner Morning Show with The Steve Harvey Morning Show, which moved from 107.5 WGCI-FM. WVAZ had been the largest affiliate by market size to carry the Tom Joyner Morning Show.
