= Chet Gulinski =

American radio broadcaster (1924–1999)

Chester "Chet" Gulinski (October 24, 1924 – August 10, 1999) was an influential Chicago-area broadcaster and promoter best known for his longtime support for polka music in Chicago. His show was heard on numerous area stations and ran for nearly 40 years.

== Early life ==
Chet Gulinski was born in Chicago, Illinois, on October 24, 1924. He attended Five Holy Martyrs Grade School, Quigley Seminary, St. Joseph's High School, and DePaul University. His earlier career included owning Ridge Prescription Pharmacy. He was a Field Representative for Rexall Drug Co., and was a Pharmaceutical Hospital Representative for E. R. Squibb & Sons. He was involved with three recording companies, Ampol, Mil-Poll, and Ridgemoor Records.

== Career ==
=== Radio ===
Chet's radio career varied. He was a Sales Manager for Radio Stations WGLD, WOPA and WPNA. He and his son Chris produced a television show on Chicago's Channel 44, later on Channel 26. He was a Staff Announcer for WTAQ and WOPA. Chet was instrumental in the purchase of WPNA by the Polish National Alliance in 1987. His efforts resulted in programs that brought Marion Lush, Lucy Bartoszewski, Emilie Richards, Bob Maczko, and Joe Walega to WPNA.

=== The Chet Gulinski Show ===
The first "Chet Gulinski Show" was broadcast at 7:30 pm, Sunday, November 5, 1955. The show broadcast many times as remotes from locations around Chicago such as the Aragon Ballroom, Chicago's Lake Front Festival, the Navy Pier, The 47th Street Free Fair, Tony Piet's Pontiac City, Delta Wholesale, Polonia Grove and Ballroom, Pulaski Village, Wozniak's Casino, Harmony Hall, Congress Ballroom, Lion's Ballroom, Maple Lanes, Polka Castle, Sportsman's Park, Lucy's Wisconsin Rendezvous and a great number of parish and picnic Festivals.

He hosted a Monday thru Friday Morning three Hour Polka Show on WPNA until 1992.

The show had enduring popularity in an around Chicago because of a large population of Eastern European immigrants and second- or third-generation descendants. Chicago holds several large populations of people of Polish, German and Lithuanian descent, and for years, they tuned in to hear Chet spin polkas or broadcast from live polka parties in the area. Several of his sponsors targeted this audience, including one sponsor who offered services to have deceased loved ones' remains transported for burial in Poland!

Until his death, Chet's broadcasts fostered quality and professionalism. His broadcasts were recorded in his own studios where he had a collection of over 3,500 albums, cassettes, and CD's, and over eighty plaques and awards a fitting testimonial for his broadcasting contribution.

Chet was active with his son Chris promoting polka tours. The tours included polka festivals, cruises, and voyages to Hawaii or European destinations. He was a Director in the International Polka Association on two occasions and a Director in UPA International. He was the President of the Senior Polka Association South and North organized in 1982, President of the Brickyard Seniors and the PRCUA. Chet was inducted into the International Polka Association Hall of Fame in 1997.

== Personal life ==
Chet was married to Evelyn. They had four children: Chris, a graduate of Marquette University, who assisted with the broadcasts and managed Action Tours, Adrian and Daniel, who are both dentists, and Renee, who has a master's degree in Psychology from the University of Chicago.

== Death ==
Chet suffered a massive heart attack and died August 10, 1999, at Northwestern Hospital, Lake Forest, Illinois. On September 1, 1999, the City of Chicago, through Alderman Ed Burke of Chicago's 14th Ward, entered a resolution in the City Council proceedings commemorating Chet's life and death.
