= WKSC-FM =

Contemporary hit radio station in Chicago

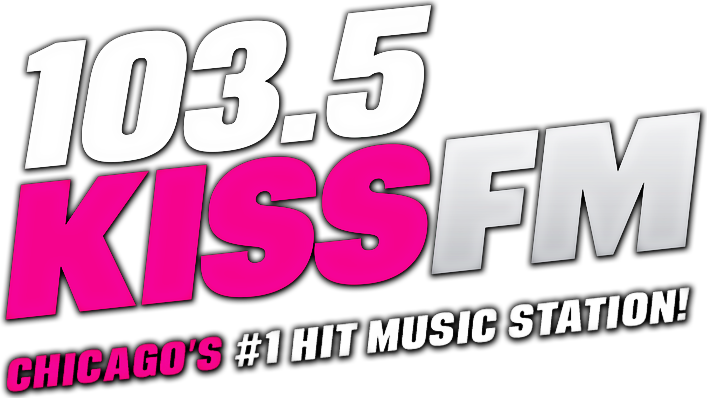
- Chicago, Illinois; United States
- Broadcast area: Chicago metropolitan area; Northwest Indiana
- Frequency: 103.5 MHz (HD Radio)
- Branding: 103.5 Kiss FM

Programming
- Language: English
- Format: Contemporary hit radio
- Subchannels: HD2: Pride Radio
- Affiliations: iHeartRadio; Premiere Networks

Ownership
- Owner: iHeartMedia; (iHM Licenses, LLC)
- Sister stations: WCHI-FM; WGCI-FM; WGRB; WLIT-FM; WVAZ; WVON

History
- First air date: November 1957
- Former call signs: WKFM (1957–1973); WFYR (1973–1983); WFYR-FM (1983–1991); WWBZ (1991–1994); WRCX (1994–1998); WUBT (1998–2001)
- Call sign meaning: KISS-FM Chicago

Technical information
- Licensing authority: FCC
- Facility ID: 74178
- Class: B
- ERP: 4,300 watts
- HAAT: 472 meters (1,549 ft)
- Transmitter coordinates: 41.879°N 87.636°W

Links
- Public license information: Public file; LMS
- Webcast: Listen live (via iHeartRadio)
- Website: 1035kissfm.iheart.com

WKSC-FM (103.5 MHz) – branded "103.5 Kiss FM" – is a commercial contemporary hit radio station licensed to Chicago, Illinois. Owned by iHeartMedia, its studios are located at the Illinois Center complex on Michigan Avenue in Downtown Chicago, and its transmitter is located at Willis Tower. WKSC is the flagship station of the syndicated morning show The Fred Show.

The station airs programming from iHeartMedia's Premiere Networks such as On Air with Ryan Seacrest, On the Move with Enrique Santos, Most Requested Live with Romeo, American Top 40, iHeartRadio Countdown, and The Vibe with Tanya and EJ.

== History ==
=== WKFM ===
The station began broadcasting in November 1957 under the call sign WKFM. WKFM was owned by Frank Kovas, Jr. The station's transmitter was located atop the Randolph Tower at 188 West Randolph, and had an ERP of 50,000 watts. On February 2, 1970, its antenna fell off the building during high winds, but no one was injured.

WKFM aired beautiful music/light classical format. The music had appropriate moods through the day, with morning and afternoon drive times more upbeat, and it was considered to have a "highbrow" sound. Programs included Morning Serenade, Musical Bon-Bons, Pleasant Listening, Rendezvous With Rhythm, Dinner Musicale, and Stereo Showcase. The station had five-minute newscasts at the top of each hour and headlines at the half-hour.

Though WEFM, the Zenith owned classical music station, was the first station to broadcast in stereo, WKFM was the first to broadcast in stereo 24/7.

=== WFYR ===
In 1973, the station was sold to RKO General for $2.4 million. The new owner changed the call letters to WFYR in March 1973. The letters FYR, standing for "Fire", were timed to just a year after the centennial of the Great Chicago Fire. The station adopted an automated oldies format, using Drake-Chenault's Classic Gold package.

In autumn 1973, RKO opened an oldies dance club, the "FYR Station", located at the McCormick Inn, where the station held live broadcasts on Friday and Saturday evenings.

In 1974, the station's transmitter was moved to the Sears Tower.

In 1976, WFYR began carrying Dick Biondi's syndicated program Super Gold Rock n' Roll.

In April 1977, the station adopted a live adult contemporary format. Personalities included Fred Winson, Dick Bartley, Stu Collins, and Dean Richards.

In the 1980s, the station carried Dick Bartley's oldies program Solid Gold Saturday Night, and Bartley's Sunday night oldies program Solid Gold Scrapbook.

By January 1989, WFYR had transitioned back to an oldies format, with the slogan "Chicago's Hottest Oldies".

In 1989, WFYR was sold to Summit Broadcasting for $21 million, as RKO General was slowly wound down due to past Federal Communications Commission (FCC) violations and investigations ending up with the FCC ruling the company as an unfit licensee. On October 30, 1989, WFYR's oldies format was dropped and replaced with an adult contemporary format.

=== The Blaze ===
In 1991, the station was sold to Major Broadcasting for $19 million. On March 29, 1991, at 6 p.m., the station signed off the air. At 4 p.m. the following day, it returned to the air with a 44-hour stunt of Rock Rock ('Til You Drop) by Def Leppard. At noon on April 1, the station debuted a hard rock format as "The Blaze". Shortly thereafter, the station's call sign was changed to WWBZ. "The Blaze" featured acts such as AC/DC, Cinderella, Def Leppard, Great White, Guns N' Roses, Kiss, Led Zeppelin, Mötley Crüe, Slaughter, and Warrant.

The station's initial on-air personalities included Steven Craig in mornings, Steve Seaver in middays, Brian Kelly in afternoons, and Kevin Lewis evenings. Other personalities on The Blaze included Leslie Harris, Scott Childers, and helicopter reporter "Major Tom".

WWBZ presented "Blazefest", a rock music memorabilia show and concert at the Odeum Expo Center in Villa Park, which featured performances by bands such as Kiss, I Mother Earth, Saigon Kick, Screamin' Cheetah Wheelies, and Warrant.

In 1993, the station was sold to Evergreen Media for $28 million.

=== Rock 103.5 ===
Over the July 4, 1994, weekend, the station stunted, playing music from a variety of music genres, promoting a feedback phone number for listeners to call, and taking potshots at B96, WCKG, Q101, and US99. At 6 a.m. on July 5, the station was relaunched as "Rock 103-5", airing an active rock format. On July 28, the station's call sign was changed to WRCX.

Mancow Muller was added to mornings and soon achieved the highest ratings for the station. Other airstaff on Rock 103-5 included Terry Gibson, Eddie Webb, Ned Spindle, Sludge, Cara Carriveau, and Chris Payne. WRCX hosted "Rockstock", which featured performances from Megadeth, Local H, Veruca Salt, Silverchair, Faith No More, Helmet, and Joan Jett & the Blackhearts.

In February 1996, sister station WYNY in New York City simulcasted WRCX for a day as part of a week-long stunt of simulcasting sister stations nationwide before flipping formats to rhythmic adult contemporary as WKTU.

In 1997, Evergreen merged with Chancellor Broadcasting.

In late June 1998, Mancow left WRCX and joined 101.1 WKQX in late July. Bob & Tom replaced Muller in the morning drive slot.

WRCX's ratings plummeted after Muller's departure; in the Spring 1998 ratings period, the station was ranked 12th in the market with a 3.2 share (though the station did well in its primary target demographics of Men 18-34 and 25-54), but in the Summer of that year, the station fell to 19th place with a 2.0 share. On October 29, 1998, Chancellor announced that WRCX would change formats. A farewell show aired October 30, with the current and former DJs re-airing station memories (which included phone-calls from Lars Ulrich and Mancow), and a final goodbye from the station's departing staff.

=== The Beat ===
The station continued its rock format (albeit jockless) until 5:30 p.m. on November 2, when, after playing "Sad but True" by Metallica, the station flipped to a rhythmic oldies format as "Chicago's Jammin' Oldies", branded first as "The New 103-5", then (after a "name the station" contest) as "The Beat". The first song on "The New 103-5" was "Get Ready" by The Temptations. Doug James was morning host on The Beat. On December 21, the station's call sign was changed to WUBT. In 2000, Larry Lujack was hired to host a program on Saturdays, which was repeated on Sundays.

Chancellor merged with Capstar and restructured as AMFM, Inc. in 1999, and in 2000, merged with Clear Channel Communications.

=== Top 40 era ===
On January 12, 2001, the station adopted a contemporary hit radio format as "Kiss 103.5". The final song on "The Beat" was "Last Dance" by Donna Summer and the first song on "Kiss" was "Get Ready for This" by 2 Unlimited. The station's call sign became the current WKSC-FM on February 13. At the time of the flip, Big City Radio's WKIE, WKIF, and WDEK had collectively been known as "92 Kiss FM" (also with a CHR format) since 1998. Clear Channel filed suit against Big City for the use of the "Kiss" name because Clear Channel owned the rights to it in most markets (and continues to do so as iHeartMedia).

The station carried the syndicated program Rick Dees Weekly Top 40, as well as American Top 40 (first with Casey Kasem and later with Ryan Seacrest). As of 2019, American Top 40 continues to air on the station. Java Joel was the evening host of The Rubber Room on the station from 2001 until January 2005 when he was fired for comments that were deemed racist. In 2002, the station adjusted its moniker from "KISS 103.5" to "103.5 KISS FM". It continues to air On Air with Ryan Seacrest as well.

DreX was morning host on WKSC-FM from 2003 until 2010.

Nina Chantele joined WKSC-FM as midday host in 2006, remaining with the station until 2014.

From August 2007 until September 2009, Silly Jilly hosted nights on WKSC. Silly Jilly was replaced by Special K, who remained with the station until 2013.

In December 2010, it was announced that Charlotte's "Brotha Fred" would take over the morning show on KISS FM. Angi Taylor and David L. joined Brotha Fred as co-hosts of the new morning show known as Brotha Fred's Neighborhood. David L. left the show in February 2012. The show was later renamed Fred and Angi in the Morning. In mid-September 2020, Taylor announced that she would be leaving the station to host mornings on sister station WCHI-FM. Fred still hosts WKSC's morning show, now known as "The Fred Show".

In November 2013, Brady joined the station as the night host and music director. In June 2015, Brady assumed afternoon and APD duties.

In October 2016, Erik Zachary was named as the new full-time evening personality and served in that position until August 2019 when he exited to pursue other opportunities.

== 103.5 HD2 ==
From June 2006 to early 2013, WKSC-FM HD2 aired programming from "Pride Radio", a Top 40/Dance format targeting the LGBTQ community. This would change to iHeart's Dance/EDM network "Evolution". In November 2013, WKSC-FM HD2 changed to a smooth jazz format along with airport information as "Air Chicago Radio". In late 2018, WKSC's HD2 subchannel began broadcasting soft adult contemporary music as "The Breeze". This overlapped with its Soft AC sister station WLIT (93.9 Lite FM). On June 26, 2019, WKSC-FM HD2 returned to "Pride Radio".
