= Java Joel =

American radio personality (born 1974)

Joel Murphy (born September 30, 1974) better known by his on-air personality Java Joel — is an American radio personality. He hosted a nightly weeknight radio program called The Rubber Room"on WKSC-FM 103.5 Kiss FM in Chicago, Illinois. His show was also heard in other cities such as WKGS/Rochester NY, WAKS/Cleveland, WKST/Pittsburgh, KKRZ/Portland Kiss FM/Tulsa, and Kiss FM/Cincinnati.

On August 4, 2006 Java Joel was hired as the night time DJ on WAKS/-96.5 KISS FM Cleveland, and in 2012 was moved to the afternoon drive slot.

In 2009, amid the Chris Brown assault allegations, he decided to pull all Chris Brown music off of his show, thus starting a station wide boycott of his music.
