= Guyon Hotel =

- U.S. National Register of Historic Places
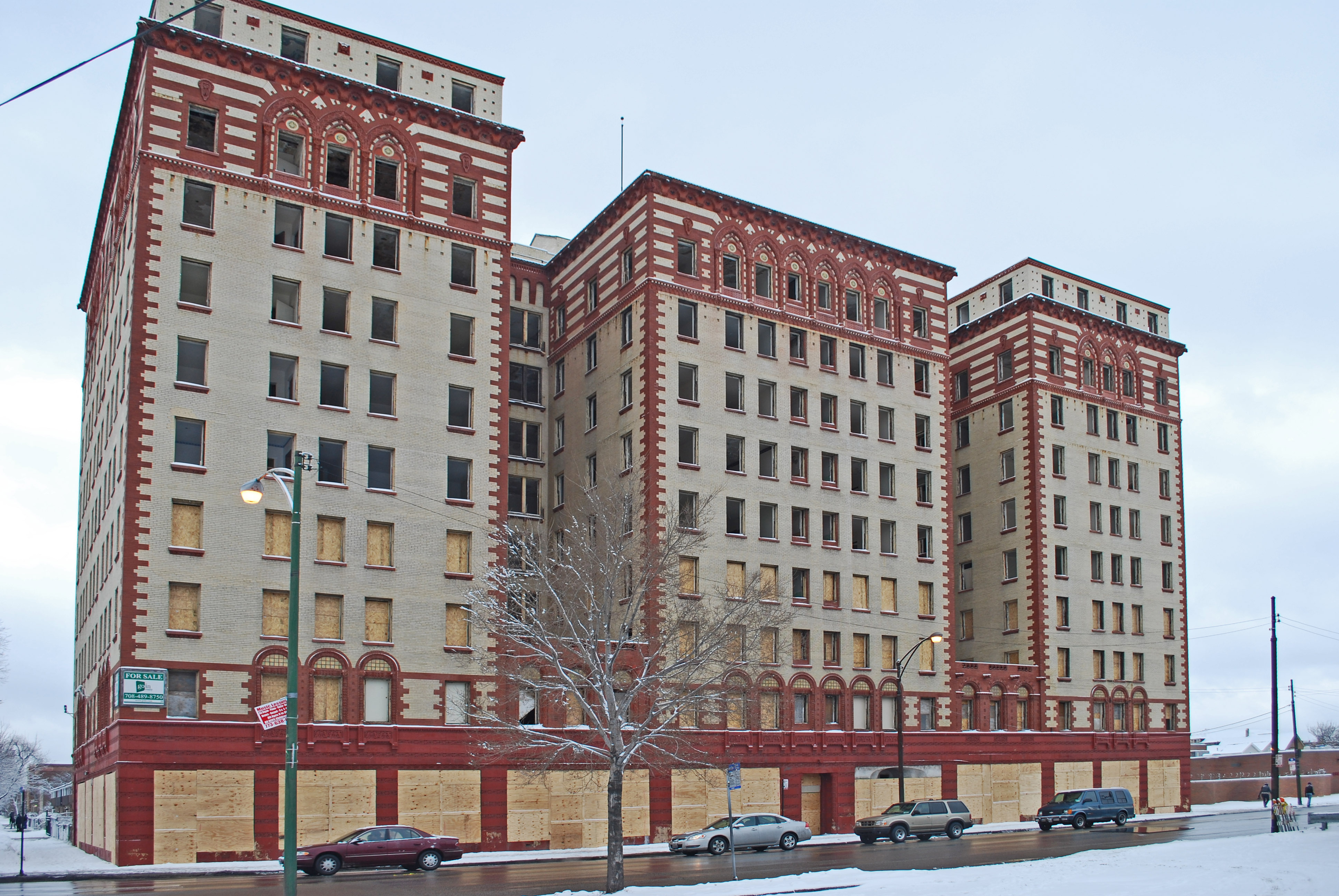
- The Guyon Hotel in 2010

- Location within Chicago metropolitan area Location within Illinois Location within the United States
- Location: 4000 W. Washington Blvd., Chicago, Illinois
- Coordinates: 41°52′55″N 87°43′35″W
- Area: less than one acre
- Built: 1928
- Architect: Jens J. Jensen
- Architectural style: Moorish Revival
- NRHP reference No.: 85000966
- Added to NRHP: May 9, 1985

The Guyon Hotel is a historic former hotel in Chicago, Illinois. The hotel was designed by Jens J. Jensen—no relation to the famous landscape architect Jens Jensen—in 1927 and was built in red and cream brick with arched windows on two floors and exquisite, detailed terra cotta ornaments typical of Jensen's work. It was built at a cost of $1,650,000 by J. Louis Guyon, a French-Canadian nightclub owner and dance instructor.

The Guyon Hotel's first floor included commercial space and the hotel's lobby. Two ballrooms were located on the second floor. Guyon resided in the south penthouse.

After the hotel opened in 1928, owner J. Louis Guyon mounted two AM radio towers to broadcast his radio station, WGES; the station aired morally conservative programming and music. One of the second floor ballrooms was used as the station's studio. Control of WGES was transferred to Harry and Thomas Guyon in the mid-1930s, and the station left the hotel in 1942, but it continues to broadcast as WGRB. The hotel entered into receivership during the Great Depression, and in 1939 it was sold for $425,000. In 1940, it was sold to Jack Galper and George London. In 1948, the AM towers were replaced with an FM tower, and WOAK began broadcasts from the hotel. WOAK became WFMT in 1951 and began airing classical music. In 1954, the station's studios and transmitter were moved to the LaSalle–Wacker Building. In 1964, the hotel was sold for $500,000.

Soon after the hotel opened, police raided the four-room suite of Jack McGurn, also known as "Machine Gun Jack McGurn", a member of Al Capone's mob, and arrested him and another man after finding a machine gun and other weapons.

In 1985, the Guyon Hotel was sold to the Lutheran non-profit organization Bethel New Life, who renovated the building and converted it to affordable housing. Former President Jimmy Carter stayed in the renovated hotel for a week while working on a rehabilitation project with Habitat for Humanity; his room was reportedly "roach-infested" and "furnished with only a couch and a milk crate". The housing effort ultimately failed when Bethel New Life ran out of funds. The building currently lies vacant and has changed possession over six times since 1995. Due to building code violations, the hotel is in city demolition court; it is considered one of the ten most endangered landmarks in Illinois by the Landmarks Preservation Council of Illinois.

The Guyon Hotel was added to the National Register of Historic Places on May 9, 1985.
