= WGCI-FM =

Urban contemporary radio station in Chicago

- Chicago, Illinois; United States
- Broadcast area: Chicago metropolitan area; Northwest Indiana
- Frequency: 107.5 MHz (HD Radio)
- Branding: 107.5 WGCI

Programming
- Language: English
- Format: Urban contemporary
- Subchannels: HD2: TikTok Radio (contemporary hit radio)
- Affiliations: iHeartRadio; Premiere Networks

Ownership
- Owner: iHeartMedia; (iHM Licenses, LLC)
- Sister stations: WCHI-FM; WGRB; WKSC-FM; WLIT-FM; WVAZ; WVON

History
- First air date: December 4, 1958
- Former call signs: WFMQ (1958–1965); WNUS-FM (1965–1975); WGCI (1975–1983)
- Call sign meaning: formerly owned by Globetrotter Communications, Inc.

Technical information
- Licensing authority: FCC
- Facility ID: 51165
- Class: B
- ERP: 3,700 watts
- HAAT: 472 meters (1,549 ft)
- Transmitter coordinates: 41.879°N 87.636°W

Links
- Public license information: Public file; LMS
- Webcast: Listen live (via iHeartRadio)
- Website: wgci.iheart.com

WGCI-FM (107.5 MHz) is an urban contemporary radio station that is licensed to Chicago, Illinois, serving the Chicago metropolitan area and Northwest Indiana. It is owned and operated by iHeartMedia (formerly known as Clear Channel Communications until September 2014).

WGCI broadcasts with 3,700 watts (3.7 kilowatts) from atop the Willis Tower in Downtown Chicago, and has studios located in the Illinois Center complex on Michigan Avenue. Like many Clear Channel-owned urban radio stations, it uses the slogan "Chicago's #1 For Hip Hop and R&B".

In 2005, WGCI began broadcasting in IBOC digital radio, using the HD Radio system from iBiquity; an HD2 subchannel currently runs iHeart's TikTok Radio CHR service, exclusively focused on songs popular on the app.

== History ==
=== WFMQ ===
1960 WFMQ advertisement

The station began broadcasting on December 4, 1958, and held the call sign WFMQ. The station was owned by Lester Vihon and broadcast from One North LaSalle with an ERP of 11,000 watts. It initially operated from 4 p.m. to midnight. WFMQ aired beautiful music, light classical, and classical music, along with show tunes, opera, and jazz programs. In 1960, the station's ERP was increased to 36,000 watts.

=== WNUS-FM ===
In 1965, the station sold to Gordon McLendon for $400,000 and its call sign was changed to WNUS-FM. The station adopted an all-news format, simulcasting AM 1390 WNUS. WNUS was the first all-news station in the United States.

In 1968, the station returned to airing a beautiful music format.

In 1973, the station's transmitter was moved to the Civic Opera Building.

=== WGCI ===
In February 1975, Globetrotter Communications Inc. purchased 107.5 FM and its sister station 1390 AM for $3,550,000. WVON's programming moved to 1390, ending the simulcast. The station's call sign was changed to WGCI later that year, and it would air a disco-oriented format. The station was branded "Studio 107".

In 1977, Globetrotter Communications was purchased by Combined Communications Corporation. The following year, Combined Communications merged with Gannett Co.

WGCI shifted away from disco in 1980, in favor of a more broad urban contemporary format.

In 1983, WVON flipped its callsign to WGCI to match its FM partner, and 107.5's call sign was changed to WGCI-FM.

In the mid-1980s, Tom Joyner, was simultaneously working for both a morning show at K-104 KKDA-FM in Dallas, Texas, and an afternoon show at WGCI. Instead of choosing between the two, Joyner chose to take both jobs, and for years he commuted daily by plane between the two cities, earning the nicknames "The Fly Jock" and "The Hardest Working Man in Radio". Doug Banks was morning drive host on WGCI from 1986 until 1993, when he was replaced by Tom Joyner's syndicated morning show. In 1997, comedian George Wallace co-hosted WGCI's morning show with Jeanne Sparrow.

In 1997, Gannett sold both WGCI-FM and WGCI 1390 to Chancellor Media. Chancellor merged with Capstar and restructured as AMFM, Inc. in 1999, and in 2000, merged with Clear Channel Communications.

In 2001, the station's transmitter was moved to the Sears Tower.

In 2006 WGCI won a Marconi Award for Best Radio Station for Hip-Hop and R&B.

The Crazy Howard McGee Show was replaced by the Steve Harvey Morning Show on August 1, 2007. Harvey had previously hosted mornings on WGCI from 1996 to 1997. In March 2009, Harvey moved to WVAZ, replacing Tom Joyner. On April 1, "The Morning Riot" debuted starring Tony Sculfield, Leon Rogers and Nina Chantele. Nina also did middays at Clear Channel sister station WKSC-FM. In January 2015, WGCI began airing a new morning show hosted by Leon Rogers, Kyle Santillian and Kendra G. Both Santillian and Kendra G left the station in 2023 and were replaced by former night DJ and comedian Zach Boog with Leon Rogers remaining on the morning show along with producer Ryan Lee.

WGCI-FM formerly simulcast on XM Satellite Radio channel 241. Station owner Clear Channel sold off its ownership stake in Sirius XM Radio during the second quarter of fiscal year 2013. As a result of the sale, nine of Clear Channel's eleven XM stations, including the simulcast of WGCI FM, ceased broadcast over XM Satellite Radio on October 18, 2013.
