= WCHI-FM =

Mainstream rock radio station in Chicago

- Chicago, Illinois; United States
- Broadcast area: Chicago metropolitan area
- Frequency: 95.5 MHz (HD Radio)
- Branding: Rock 95.5

Programming
- Language: English
- Format: Mainstream rock
- Subchannels: HD2: Big 95.5 HD2 (country music)

Ownership
- Owner: iHeartMedia; (iHM Licenses, LLC)
- Sister stations: WGCI-FM; WGRB; WKSC-FM; WLIT-FM; WVAZ; WVON

History
- First air date: March 9, 1959
- Former call signs: WDHF (1959–1976); WMET (1976–1986); WRXR (1986–1987); WNUA (1987–2015); WEBG (2015–2020)
- Call sign meaning: Chicago

Technical information
- Licensing authority: FCC
- Facility ID: 53971
- Class: B
- ERP: 5,300 watts (analog); 212 watts (digital)
- HAAT: 425 meters (1,394 ft)
- Transmitter coordinates: 41.899°N 87.623°W

Links
- Public license information: Public file; LMS
- Webcast: Listen live (via iHeartRadio); Listen live (HD2)
- Website: rock955chi.iheart.com; big955chicago.iheart.com (HD2)

WCHI-FM (95.5 MHz) is a mainstream rock formatted radio station located in Chicago, Illinois, owned and operated by iHeartMedia. WCHI-FM has studios located at the Illinois Center complex on Michigan Avenue in Downtown Chicago, and it broadcasts from a 5.3 kW transmitter based atop John Hancock Center.

WCHI-FM broadcasts three channels in the HD Radio format.

== History ==
The station began broadcasting on March 9, 1959 as WDHF, owned by Hi-Fi systems and record store owner James deHaan. Its call sign stood for deHaan Hi-Fi. The station operated out of deHaan's store in the Evergreen Plaza in Evergreen Park, Illinois. Its transmitter and tower was in Oak Lawn, at 97th and Central. WDHF's studios and deHaan's record store moved to 102nd and Western Avenue in Chicago, in 1961.

In 1964, WDHF was sold to Federal Broadcasting Corporation for $200,000. Controlling interest in Federal Broadcasting was owned by comedian Bob Newhart. Its studios were moved to the Loop, at 108 N. State St. In 1966, WDHF was sold to the National Science Network for $427,000. In 1971, the station's transmitter was moved to the John Hancock Center on the Near North Side of Chicago. Under deHaan's, Newhart's and the National Science Network's ownership, WDHF aired an easy listening/big band format.

In 1973, the station was sold to Metromedia for $2.75 million and it adopted an adult contemporary format. The following year, WDHF adopted a top 40 format. During this era, WDHF was the local broadcaster of the weekly syndicated program American Top 40. Jim Channell, known on the air as "Captain Whammo", was a DJ on the station during its top 40 years.

On December 1, 1976, the station's callsign was changed to WMET, while retaining its top 40 format. In 1979, Metromedia flipped WMET to an AOR format. In 1982, WMET was sold to Doubleday Broadcasting for $9.5 million.

WMET called itself "Chicago's Classic Rock" in 1981.

On January 11, 1985, at 3 p.m., WMET switched to an adult contemporary format. As a promotional stunt, in the days leading up to the format change the station periodically interrupted the rock programming with static and a man's voice stating "enough is enough". Ratings were poor under the new format, and the station was sold to Flint Chicago Associates for $12.5 million in early 1986.

In May 1986, the station's call sign was changed to WRXR, and it adopted an early version of what would later become the adult hits format (described as "Male Adult Contemporary" by station management), with a playlist featuring artists like The Beach Boys, The Doobie Brothers, ZZ Top and Sade. In 1987, WRXR was sold to Pyramid Broadcasting for $15 million.

=== Smooth jazz era ===
WNUA's logo as a smooth jazz station

On August 3, 1987, the station's callsign was changed to WNUA and the station adopted a format which featured new-age music and smooth jazz, along with music from R&B and rock artists that were compatible with the station's sound. WNUA's original slogan was "Music For a New Age", and New Age was the source of the station's call letters. By 1989, the station's slogan was "Smooth Rock, Smooth Jazz". "Smooth Rock" would later be dropped from its slogan. As a smooth jazz station, WNUA was a major pioneer in the format.

In 1995, the station's owner, Pyramid Communications, was acquired by Evergreen Media. In 1997, Evergreen merged with Chancellor Broadcasting. Chancellor merged with Capstar and restructured as AMFM, Inc. in 1999, and in 2000 merged with Clear Channel Communications making WNUA a Clear Channel station.

WNUA was the home of the now-defunct Ramsey Lewis morning show, and it was also where he recorded his syndicated show, Legends of Jazz (which showcased the music of instrumentalists Charlie Parker, Oscar Peterson and Miles Davis, as well as vocalists Louis Armstrong, Billie Holiday and Ella Fitzgerald) for distribution to other smooth jazz stations across the nation. The show lived on in Chicago on WLFM-LP during that station's run, and later on WDCB. Other on-air staff included Karen Williams, Rick O'Dell, Danae Alexander, Dave Koz, Bill Cochran, Scott Adams, Annie Ashe, Dona Mullen, Glenn Cosby, and Porsche Stevens. Rick O'Dell was also program director/music director.

In late 2006, three smooth jazz personalities, WNUA's Ramsey Lewis, Annie Ashe, and Dave Koz, were tapped by Broadcast Architecture to syndicate their respective shows on its Smooth Jazz Network.

WNUA won Radio & Records' Smooth Jazz Station of the Year award eight consecutive years, from 1998 to 2005, and was the recipient of the Marconi Award for NAC/Jazz Station of the Year in 2004.

=== Spanish-language era ===
On May 22, 2009, at 9:50 a.m., after playing Richard Elliot's "Here And Now", WNUA stunted for 5 minutes with a ticking clock and an announcer saying "In _ minutes, 95.5 reaches its big/mega event." Along with the clock sound, they aired a recap of jingles and moments from its history as WDHF, WMET, WRXR, and WNUA. 95.5 then had a countdown from 10 to 1 switching in the middle from English to Spanish. At 9:55 a.m., WNUA flipped formats to Spanish hot AC as Mega 95.5. The Smooth Jazz format was picked up a few hours later by television station WLFM-LP (Channel 6), whose audio is available on 87.7 FM.

Following lackluster ratings as Mega 95.5, on June 19, 2012, after playing "Creo en Ti" by Mexican rock band Reik, WNUA switched to a Regional Mexican format known as "El Patrón 95.5" to more directly compete with WLEY and WOJO. However, the station's ratings failed to improve; in the December 2014 ratings report for the market, WNUA held a 1.9 share of the market.

=== Big 95.5 ===
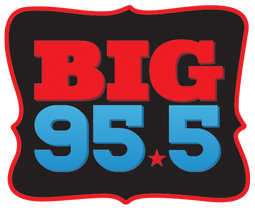
"Big 95.5" logo (2015–2020)

On January 5, 2015, at 12 p.m., WNUA flipped to country as "Big 95.5", giving WUSN its first local competitor since WKXK in 1997. The first song on "Big" was This Is How We Roll by Florida Georgia Line.

On January 12, 2015, WNUA changed callsigns to WEBG to match the "Big" branding. The callsign WEBG was previously used by Orlando, Florida sister station WRUM from 2004 to 2005.

WEBG would serve as the Chicago affiliate of The Bobby Bones Show, first in evenings on a delay before being moved to mornings in August 2018.

=== Rock 95.5 ===
While WEBG, unlike many past competitors, was able to put up a fight against WUSN, they would still finish behind them, and typically hit a 1 or 2 share in the Nielsen ratings, putting them in the lower echelon of commercial stations in the crowded Chicago market. While the last ratings, released just two days before the format ended, saw a decent upward trend (seeing them tie the July 2020 results with a 2.1 share, up from a 1.7 in June and just .2 points behind WUSN), it was ultimately too little, too late for the "Big" format.

On September 3, 2020, at 11 a.m., after playing "Happy Trails" by Roy Rogers, WEBG began stunting with music from various genres (the first song being "It's the End of the World as We Know It (And I Feel Fine)" by R.E.M.), punctuated by liners during the top-of-the-hour station identification stating "It's going to sound weird here. Keep listening". The country format moved to the HD2 subchannel of the station; the previous smooth jazz format on that subchannel was subsequently moved to a new HD3 subchannel.

At 5 p.m. that day, after playing "The Final Countdown" by Europe, WEBG flipped to rock as "Rock 95.5". The first song on "Rock" was "Enter Sandman" by Metallica. The format, while playing similar music to what it had during the days of WDHF, WMET, and even WRXR, also features a variety of rock reaching into the 1990s and as far as the late 2000s. The flip positions WEBG between Hubbard's classic rock-formatted WDRV and Cumulus' alternative-formatted WKQX, and brings a harder-edged rock station back to the market for the first time since WLUP was sold and flipped to K-Love in 2018. Following the format change, WEBG applied to change its call sign to WCHI-FM; the change took effect on September 14, 2020.

On September 14, 2020, iHeartMedia announced that Angie Taylor from sister station WKSC-FM would host mornings on WCHI, alongside Abe Kanan.

After a social media campaign for the slot, night host Maria Palmer was moved to mornings alongside Matthew (Marris) Harris and Michael Mason. They launched the "January 6th Erection" of the Morning Mosh Pit on January 6, 2025.

== HD Radio ==
When WNUA signed on HD Radio operations in 2006, the station's HD2 sub-channel aired a traditional jazz format. After the analog/HD1 flipped to "Mega" in 2009, the smooth jazz format was moved to the HD2 sub-channel. From 2012 to 2016, WNUA-HD2 carried ESPN Deportes Radio programming, which was translated by Hillside-licensed W248BB on 97.5 FM, a station owned by the Educational Media Foundation, a frequent collaborator on iHeartMedia's translator operations.

Smooth jazz returned to 95.5's HD2 sub-channel in December 2018. After the flip of WEBG to rock on September 3, 2020, the analog/HD1's previous country format moved to 95.5-HD2.
