= WLIT-FM =

Adult contemporary radio station in Chicago, Illinois

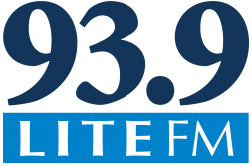
- Chicago, Illinois; United States
- Broadcast area: Chicago metropolitan area; Northwest Indiana
- Frequency: 93.9 MHz (HD Radio)
- Branding: 93.9 Lite FM

Programming
- Language: English
- Format: Adult contemporary
- Affiliations: iHeartRadio; Premiere Networks

Ownership
- Owner: iHeartMedia; (iHM Licenses, LLC)
- Sister stations: WCHI-FM; WGCI-FM; WGRB; WKSC-FM; WVAZ; WVON

History
- First air date: April 7, 1958
- Former call signs: WEBH-FM (1958–1959); WEBH (1959–1970); WWEL (1970–1972); WLAK (1972–1989)
- Call sign meaning: "Lite"

Technical information
- Licensing authority: FCC
- Facility ID: 70042
- Class: B
- ERP: 4,000 watts (analog); 159 watts (digital)
- HAAT: 482 meters (1,581 ft)
- Transmitter coordinates: 41°52′44.1″N 87°38′8.2″W
- Translator: 99.1 W256CL (Park Forest)

Links
- Public license information: Public file; LMS
- Webcast: Listen live (via iHeartRadio)
- Website: 939litefm.iheart.com

WLIT-FM (93.9 MHz, "93.9 Lite FM") is a radio station in Chicago, Illinois. Owned by iHeartMedia, it broadcasts a Mainstream AC format. Its studios are located at the Illinois Center complex in the Chicago Loop, while the station transmitter is on top of the Willis Tower.

== History ==
=== WEBH ===
This station signed on the air as WEBH-FM on April 7, 1958; the call letters stood for the Edgewater Beach Hotel, the location of its original studios and transmitter site. The station was owned by the Buddy Black Broadcasting Co.

WEBH-FM aired easy listening music, along with popular jazz on weekday evenings, a classical music block on Sundays afternoons, and Sunday morning religious programming. In 1968, the station's transmitter was moved to Riverside Plaza, and its studios were moved to the Congress Plaza Hotel. In 1969, the station was sold to Rich Communications Corp. for $325,000.

=== WWEL ===
In January 1970, the station's call sign was changed to WWEL. WWEL broadcast a beautiful music format. The EL in WWEL's call sign was chosen to describe its Easy Listening format. In 1971, the station's transmitter was moved to the John Hancock Center, and it was sold to Sudbrink Broadcasting. The station's studios were moved to the John Hancock Center the following year.

=== WLAK ===
In February 1972, the station's call sign was changed to WLAK. This time the call letters referred to Lake Michigan where Chicago is the largest port. WLAK adopted the beautiful music format produced and distributed by Stereo Radio Productions, as did the other Sudbrink FM stations. WLAK did well in the ratings throughout the 1970s, and was the top rated FM station in 1975.

In 1974, the station's transmitter and studios were moved to the Sears Tower. In 1978, WLAK was sold to Storer Broadcasting for $4.25 million. That December, Storer announced that it would exit radio to focus on its television stations and cable systems. While the company's other radio stations were sold in 1979, Federal Communications Commission (FCC) regulations of the time required Storer to retain WLAK for three years. Storer sold WLAK to Viacom International for $8 million in 1981.

In March 1982, WLAK's format began to shift towards soft adult contemporary. More soft vocals were added to the playlist, while the share of instrumentals was reduced. Core artists included Neil Diamond, Barbra Streisand, Lionel Richie, and softer selections by the Beatles. On August 8, 1983, it completed its transition to soft AC. The instrumentals were cut entirely, and the station was branded as "Love Songs". It featured love songs from the 1960s, 1970s, and 1980s, from artists such as Dionne Warwick, Frank Sinatra, and Gordon Lightfoot. Later, its slogan was "Songs to Sing Along With," as it continued to air a soft AC format.

=== WLIT-FM ===
WLAK changed call letters on January 16, 1989, to WLIT-FM, and rebranded as "Lite FM", using the slogan "Lite Favorites". Viacom sold its radio stations to Chancellor Broadcasting in 1997. In 1999, Chancellor restructured as AMFM Inc. In 2000, WLIT's ownership changed to Clear Channel Communications after Clear Channel's merger with AMFM.

Over time, the station evolved to a mainstream adult contemporary format. WLIT became Chicago's only adult contemporary station on August 1, 2011, when former rival 105.9 WCFS-FM flipped to a simulcast of all-news radio 780 WBBM. This marked the first time in years Chicago only had one AC radio station.

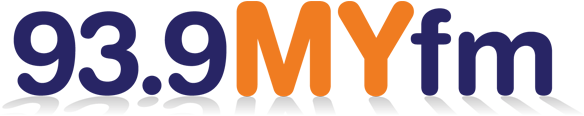
My FM logo, 2013 to 2017

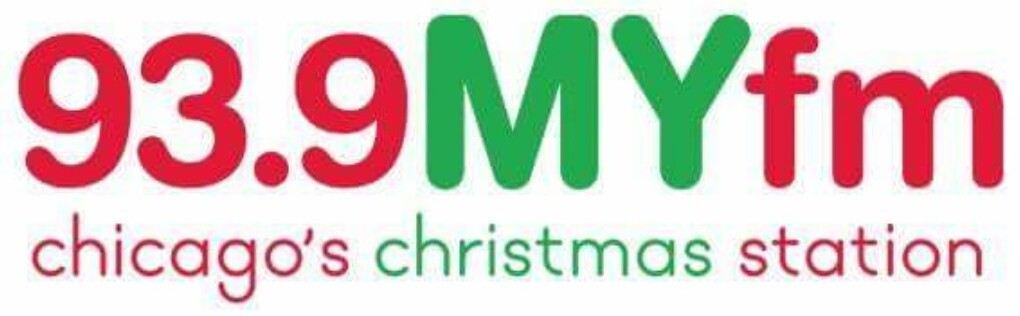
My FM Christmas logo

On June 17, 2013, at 9 am, Clear Channel re-launched WLIT as "93.9 My FM" and retired the Lite FM brand in Chicago after 24 years. The first song on "My FM" was "Teenage Dream" by Katy Perry. The station's playlist was adjusted to be more current/recurrent-based.

On December 1, 2017, during its annual Christmas music programming, WLIT returned to the Lite FM branding. The station also dropped its carriage of the syndicated On with Mario Lopez evening show, replacing it with the syndicated call-in and dedications show Delilah.

In December 2018, Robert Feder reported that WLIT planned to flip to a soft adult contemporary format. It would begin using the slogan "Relaxing Favorites" after the conclusion of its Christmas programming.

As of September 2023, WLIT has been constantly ranked number one in Chicago, according to Nielsen Audio.

In May 2025, WLIT dropped its “Relaxing Favorites” slogan in favor for “More Music, More Variety”, returning to its previous mainstream adult contemporary format.

== HD programming ==
In February 2006, WLIT began broadcasting in HD Radio. WLIT's HD2 subchannel was originally a simulcast of the now-defunct "Real Oldies" AM 1690 WRLL (now WVON). It later changed to a mix of disco music and 1970s/1980s oldies called "Flashback". In August 2009, the format changed again, this time to a gold-based AC format known as "Chicago's Classic Lite", and later branded as "Delilah".

On February 1, 2016, WLIT's HD2 adopted a Regional Mexican format branded "Poder 97.5" (Power 97.5), which was rebroadcast at 97.5 MHz through FM translator W248BB. On May 6, 2019, WLIT-HD2 dropped the "Poder 97.5" Regional Mexican format and switched to iHeart's "The Breeze" soft adult contemporary format. The 97.5 translator flipped to Christian contemporary music, as an affiliate of K-Love. As of December 2019, K-Love broke away from the WCKL-FM simulcast and started simulcasting Air1 from WCKL-HD2. In early 2022, the HD2 subchannel ceased operations.

== Christmas music ==
WLIT Christmas Logo

From November through Christmas Day every year, WLIT switches to all Christmas music, resuming its regular branding and AC format on December 26. It is traditionally one of the earlier stations to adopt an all-Christmas format, traditionally doing so between November 1 and November 5, compared to the November 10 standard iHeart uses for most of its other stations. Its Christmas mix, featuring approximately 250 songs, weighs heavily toward standards, especially in early November, so as to give listeners a greater emphasis on the familiar.

== Personalities ==
In December 2000, the station began airing the nationally syndicated Delilah program on weekday evenings. It is produced by Premiere Networks, which is co-owned with WLIT. WLIT cancelled Delilah's program in November 2007, but it returned in October 2008. Delilah's program was taken off WLIT again in March 2012, but was brought back to 93.9 in December 2017, after the station returned to its "Lite FM" branding. Delilah is currently heard Sunday through Friday evenings.

WLIT also carries the Ellen K Weekend Show from co-owned KOST Los Angeles on Saturday mornings. As with Delilah, Ellen K is syndicated by Premiere Networks.

Melissa Forman joined WLIT as morning host in 2001, remaining until 2006, but returning 14 months later. Forman was again let go in 2009, and began co-hosting "You & Me This Morning" on WCIU-TV, but was again hired as morning host on WLIT in May 2018.

WLIT's midday DJ is Robin Rock, Mick Lee is heard in afternoon drive time and Theresa Lucas overnight.
