= WBGX =

Currently silent
- Harvey, Illinois; United States
- Broadcast area: Chicago Metropolitan Area
- Frequency: 1570 kHz

Programming
- Format: Gospel

Ownership
- Owner: Brian Byrnes

History
- First air date: 1955
- Former call signs: WBEE (1955–1989); WMNN (1989); WBEE (1989–2003)
- Call sign meaning: "Big Gospel Express"

Technical information
- Licensing authority: FCC
- Facility ID: 40147
- Class: B
- Power: 1,100 watts day; 500 watts night
- Transmitter coordinates: 41°36′14.12″N 87°40′45.17″W
- Translator: 95.9 W240EI (Harvey)

Links
- Public license information: Public file; LMS
- Webcast: Listen live
- Website: gospel1570.com

WBGX (1570 AM) is a silent radio station which last broadcast a gospel format. Located in Harvey, Illinois, United States, it serves the Chicago area. The station is owned by Brian Byrnes.

== History ==
The station began broadcasting in 1955, and held the call sign WBEE. It was owned by Rollins Broadcasting and aired an R&B format. Originally running 250 watts during daytime hours only, in 1956 its power was increased to 1,000 watts. In 1968, WBEE adopted an all-jazz format. On September 28, 1989, its call sign was changed to WMNN, and it began airing ten minutes of financial news at the top of the hour, as an affiliate of Money Network Radio. However, its call sign was changed back to WBEE on November 15, 1989.

In October 2003, Great Lakes Radio purchased the station for $2.2 million from owner Charles Sherrell, and its call sign was changed to WBGX. The station switched to a gospel music format. During the following months the entire station was rebuilt. A new tower was added to increase power to serve a larger population. A new building on the corner of 60th and S. Michigan Ave was purchased in December 2003, and new studio was built which opened in May 2004. Gospel Industry Specialist Veronica Williams was the only staff member retained.

In summer 2020, former Cook County Board President Todd Stroger and Maze Jackson joined WBGX as morning hosts, after leaving WVON when they were told by station management that they could no longer discuss Mayor Lori Lightfoot, and to disconnect any callers who were critical of her.

== Translator ==
Call sign	Frequency	City of license	FID	ERP (W)	Class	Transmitter coordinates	FCC info
W240EI	95.9 FM	Harvey, Illinois	203056	250	D	41°36′14.8″N 87°40′45.7″W	LMS
