= WVON =

- Berwyn, Illinois; United States
- Broadcast area: Chicago metropolitan area
- Frequency: 1690 kHz
- Branding: AM 1690 WVON

Programming
- Language: English
- Format: African-American-oriented talk
- Affiliations: Premiere Networks

Ownership
- Owner: iHeartMedia; (iHM Licenses, LLC)
- Operator: Midway Broadcasting Corporation
- Sister stations: WCHI-FM; WGCI-FM; WGRB; WKSC-FM; WLIT-FM; WVAZ

History
- First air date: October 2003
- Former call signs: WHTE (1998–2003); WRLL (2003–06)
- Call sign meaning: "The Voice of the Negro" "The Voice of the Nation"

Technical information
- Licensing authority: FCC
- Facility ID: 87178
- Class: B
- Power: 10,000 watts day; 1,000 watts night
- Transmitter coordinates: 41°44′14.12″N 87°42′4.18″W

Links
- Public license information: Public file; LMS
- Webcast: Listen live (via iHeartRadio)
- Website: wvon.com

WVON (1690 AM "The Voice of the Nation", originally "Voice of the Negro") is a radio station serving the Chicago market, which airs an African-American-oriented talk format. WVON is operated by Midway Broadcasting Corporation via a local marketing agreement with frequency owner iHeartMedia.

WVON's predecessor station began catering to an African-American audience in the 1940s. In 1963 Chess Records bought the station and debuted WVON, with its programming of soul, and rhythm and blues music becoming very popular throughout the 1960s. The station's news and commentary also played an active role during the Civil Rights Movement during this era. Its African-American-oriented talk format began in 1986. The station served as a springboard for Barack Obama during the early days of his political career.

Licensed to Berwyn, Illinois, WVON has studios in the South Loop, and its transmitter is located at 87th and Kedzie in Chicago's Ashburn community.

== History ==
=== Station's origins ===
WVON's origins lie in WHFC, which began in 1926, broadcasting from the Hotel Flanders in Chicago. It was owned by Richard W. Hoffman. Like many stations of the time, WHFC shared time with other stations on its frequency. Its city of license was later changed to Cicero, Illinois, and it studios and transmitter were moved to Cermak Rd. in Cicero. In early years, WHFC aired pop music from singers like Bing Crosby, and aired live band performances from Cicero's Olympic Ballroom. In 1930, WHFC moved to 1420, where it shared time with WEHS and WKBI. Hoffman bought out the other two stations, and by 1936 it operated on 1420 full-time. WHFC's frequency was changed to 1450 in 1941, as a result of the North American Regional Broadcasting Agreement.

In the early 1950s, WHFC's studios and transmitter were moved to 3350 S. Kedzie, in Chicago's South Lawndale community. In the 1940s, 1950s, and 1960s, WHFC aired ethnic and African-American programming. Ernie Banks hosted a program on the station in the late 1950s. WHFC's programming was simulcast on 97.9 WEHS after WEHS's storecasting contract expired in the 1950s.

=== Beginnings of WVON ===
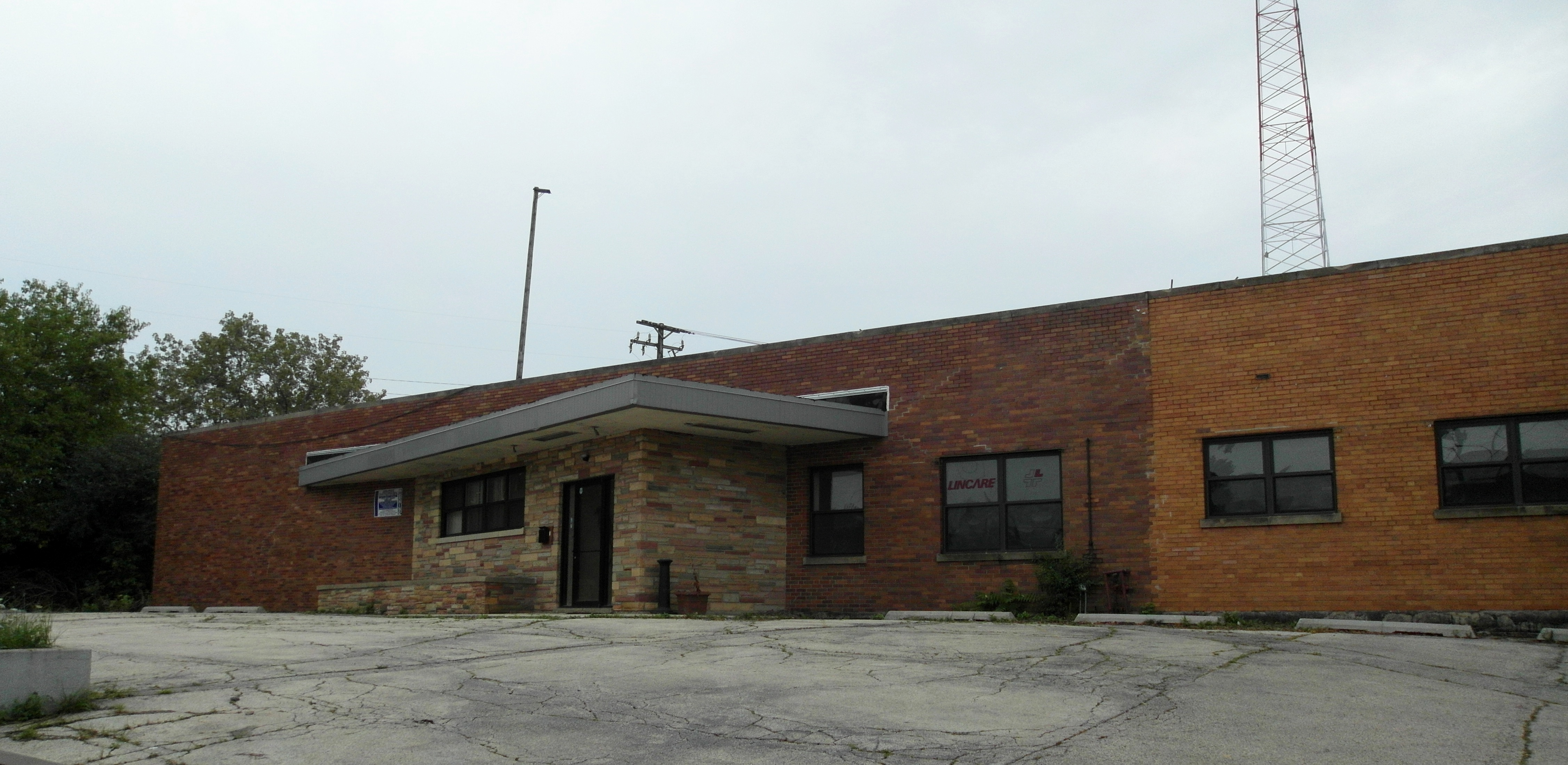
WVON's former studio building in South Lawndale

In 1963, WHFC became WVON when it was purchased by Leonard and Phil Chess, the owners of Chess Records, for $1 million. WEHS was included in the sale. WVON debuted on April 1, 1963, and quickly became a success playing R&B music, becoming the second most listened to Chicago station during evening hours by early 1964. WEHS's call sign was changed to WHFC, and simulcast WVON's programming until 1965, when 97.9 adopted a jazz format as WSDM. WVON ran 1,000 watts during the day and 250 watts at night. Though the station was initially geared strictly to a black audience, by 1968 its playlist had expanded to include songs by white artists that were compatible with the station's sound, in an effort to reach a wider audience.

WVON was a "heritage" station to Chicago's black community featuring great Black air personalities like Moses "Lucky" Cordell, Bruce Brown, Herb Kent "The Cool Gent", E. Rodney Jones, Cecil Hale, Joe "Youngblood" Cobb, Ed "Nassau Daddy" Cook, Bill "Butterball" Crane, Pervis Spann, Don Cornelius, Sid McCoy (who would accompany Cornelius when he formed Soul Train), Richard Pegue, Bernadine C. Washington, Jay Johnson, newsmen Roy Wood and Jim Moloney, a very young reporter/engineer Larry Langford and many others. WVON became well known outside the Chicago area as well. Berry Gordy, the president of Motown Records, sent every song he produced immediately to WVON before any other station. Other similar stations across the country took inspiration from WVON's format. The station also had an active role during the Civil Rights Movement, covering it extensively. Rev. Jesse Jackson called into the station to report the assassination of Martin Luther King Jr.

=== Sale to Globetrotter and move to 1390 ===
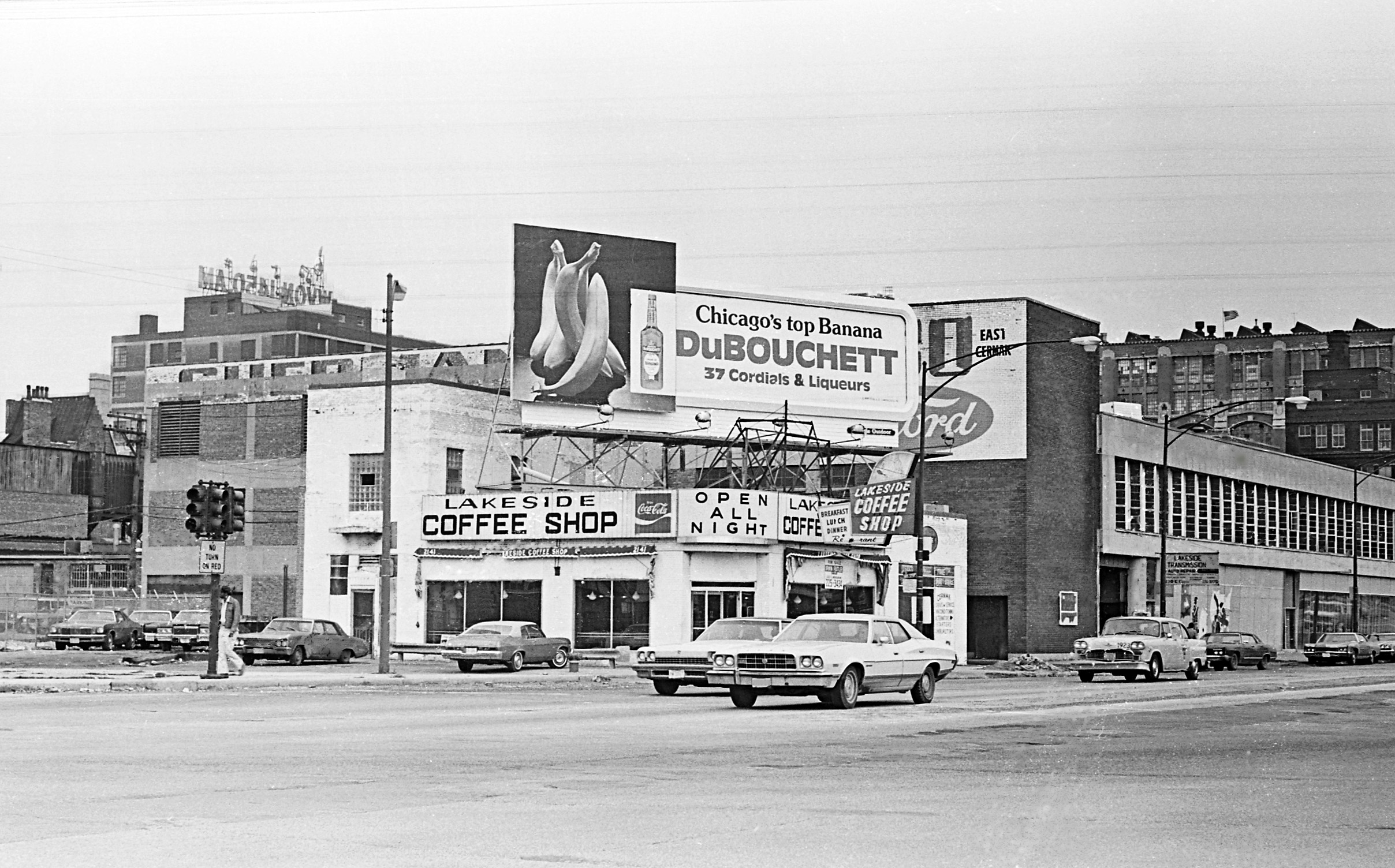
Sign for WVON 1450 AM above and behind Lakeside Coffee Shop at 2141 S Indiana, Chicago, March 1979.

After Leonard Chess died in 1969, the Chess family decided to sell WVON to Globetrotter Communications, owned by George N. Gillett Jr. and Potter Palmer for $9 million. The sale was consummated in 1970. In 1975, Globetrotter bought WNUS-AM-FM from the McLendon interests for $4,450,000; they moved WVON from 1450 to the 5,000-watt former WNUS signal on 1390 on February 5 of that year at 3:30 p.m., which increased WVON's coverage area significantly. The 1450 frequency was left silent for a time. On August 24, 1976, FM classical music station WFMT was allowed to simulcast on 1450 as an interim operator while the Federal Communications Commission (FCC) evaluated applications for a new license for the frequency. WVON reduced its news and community programming beginning in 1974, but continued to air a weekly broadcast by Jesse Jackson.

In 1977, Combined Communications Corporation purchased Globetrotter Communications, and the following year Combined Communications merged with Gannett Co. In 1982, Yvonne Daniels joined WVON as morning drive host.

=== Shared-time on 1450 ===
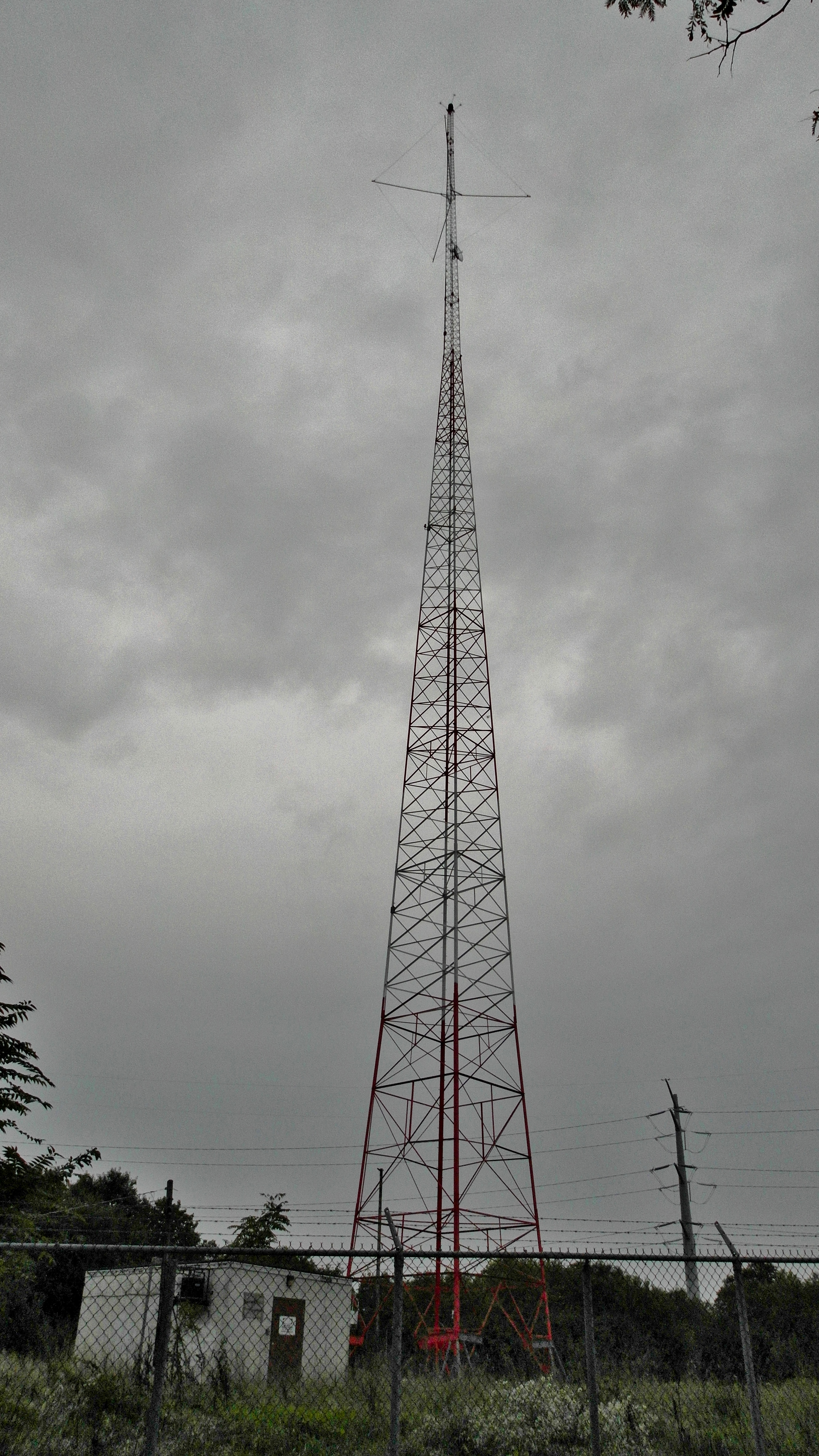
WVON's former tower at 1450 AM

The FCC process of assigning a license for the vacant 1450 AM frequency resulted in a shared-time arrangement, as applicants Midway Broadcasting Corporation and Migala Communications reached an agreement to split the broadcast day. Two former WVON personalities, Pervis Spann and Wesley South, were the principals of Midway Broadcasting. They accepted the random issue call sign WXOL, while Migala chose WCEV ("We're Chicagoland's Ethnic Voice") as their call sign. Jan Under the agreement, WCEV would operate from 1 p.m. to 10 p.m. Monday through Friday, with WXOL taking the rest of the hours. Both stations were on the air by October 1979 and shared a transmitting tower. The 317-foot (97 m) tower was located at the old WVON site at 3350 South Kedzie Avenue. WXOL broadcast from studios at that location, while WCEV built its own facilities on the northwest side of Chicago.

WXOL aired a blues oriented format, and its appearance on the dial sparked an immediate increase in the sales of blues records in the Chicago area.

WGCI (107.5 FM) was also programmed to appeal to black audiences, and it and other FM stations won away many of WVON's listeners. WGCI became so successful that Gannett changed the call letters of 1390 from WVON to WGCI in 1983. Midway Broadcasting immediately filed a request with the FCC to change WXOL's call sign to WVON, and on March 28, 1984, the WVON call letters returned to their former home at 1450. The station experienced a 50% increase in its audience after the call sign change.

In 1986, WVON adopted a black-oriented talk radio format. In 2002, then State Senator Barack Obama filled in for vacationing Cliff Kelley. Roland Martin hosted a program on WVON from October 2005 to October 2008.

=== Move to 1690 ===
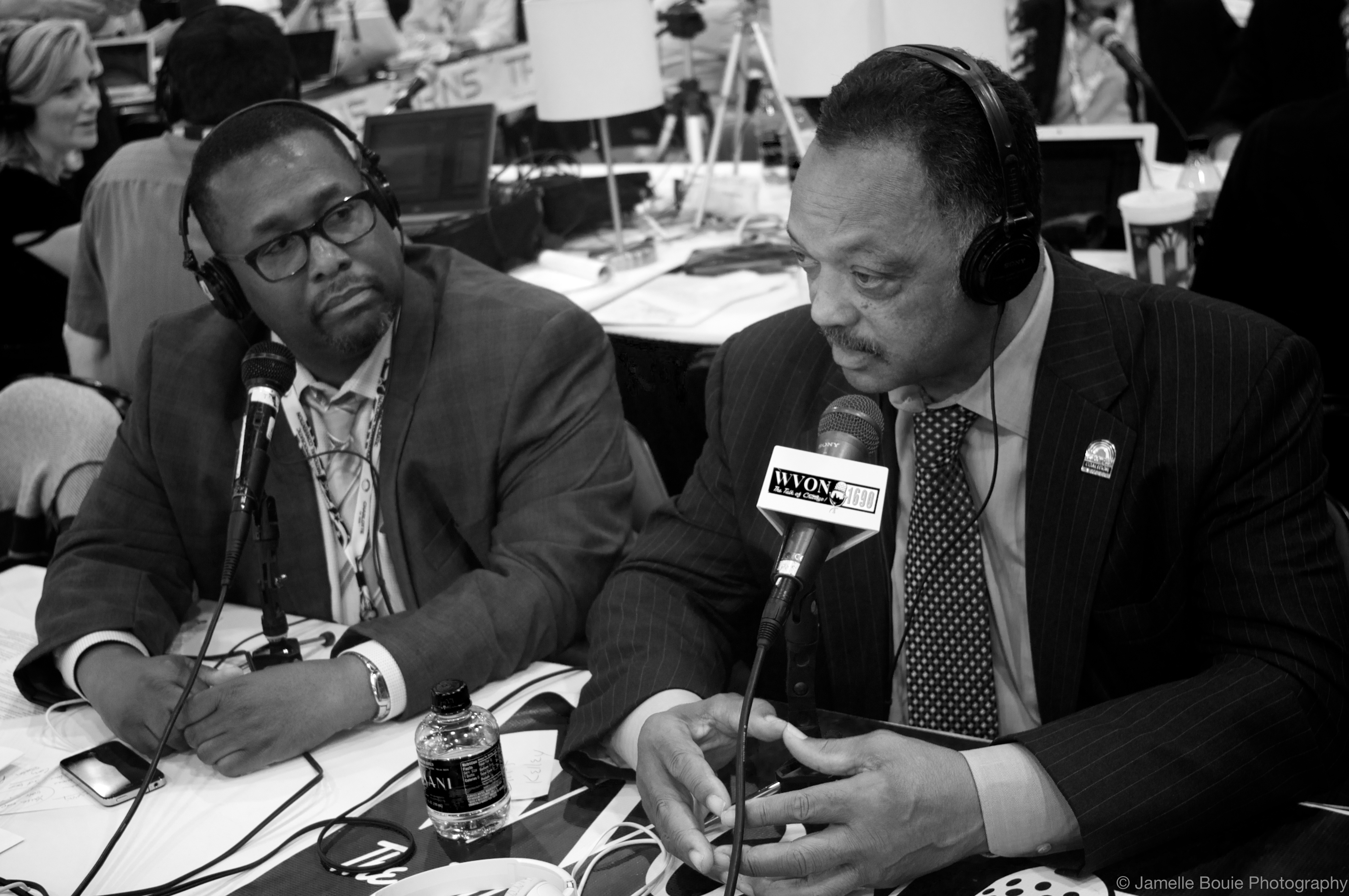
Wendell Pierce and Jesse Jackson on WVON during the 2012 Democratic National Convention

On September 18, 2006, the station got another signal upgrade when WVON's call letters and programming moved to 1690 AM broadcasting with 10,000 watts during the day. This happened when Midway Broadcasting took over management of the station using an LMA (like a lease agreement) on the frequency licensed to Berwyn, Illinois, and owned by Clear Channel Communications (now known as iHeartMedia). The move displaced the oldies format of Clear Channel-operated WRLL on 1690. (Note: For regulatory purposes, the FCC regards the 1690 AM facility as having changed call signs from WRLL to WVON on September 18, 2006.) The WRLL call letters were assigned to Midway's half of the time-share on 1450 at Cicero, Illinois.

In 2007, the station's studios were moved from their longtime home at 3350 S. Kedzie to the former Soft Sheen Products Building on 87th Street in Chicago's Chatham neighborhood. In late 2018, its studios were moved to the South Loop.

In May 2019, Todd Stroger, a former Cook County Board President, joined the station as morning co-host. In summer 2020, Stroger left WVON, along with his co-host Maze Jackson, after being told by station management that they could no longer discuss Mayor Lori Lightfoot, and to disconnect any callers who were critical of her, immediately joining 1570 WBGX in the same time slot.
