= Polish National Alliance =

American fraternal organization

- Związek Narodowy Polski
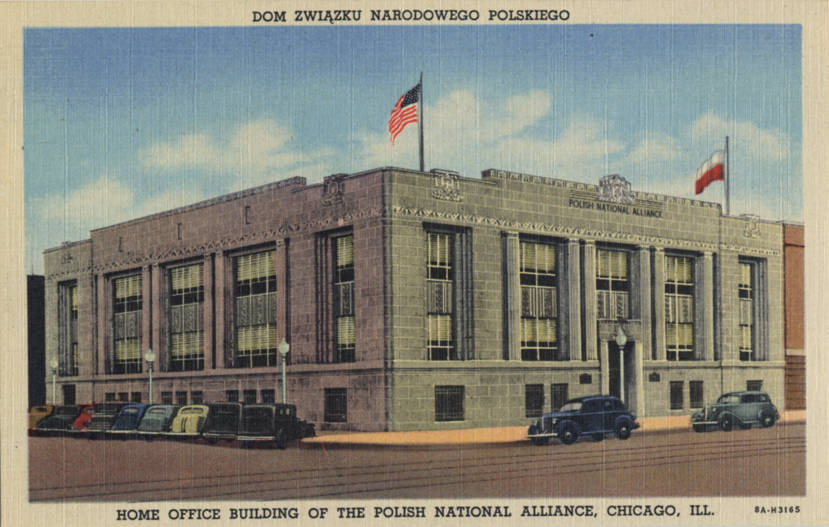
- The Historic home office building of the Polish National Alliance, Chicago
- Established: February 15, 1880; 146 years ago
- Founder: Agaton Giller
- Founded at: Philadelphia
- Headquarters: Forest Glen, Chicago
- Region served: United States
- Publication: Zgoda (1881-1908); Dziennik Związkowy; WPNA (1987-2022)
- Website: pna-znp.org

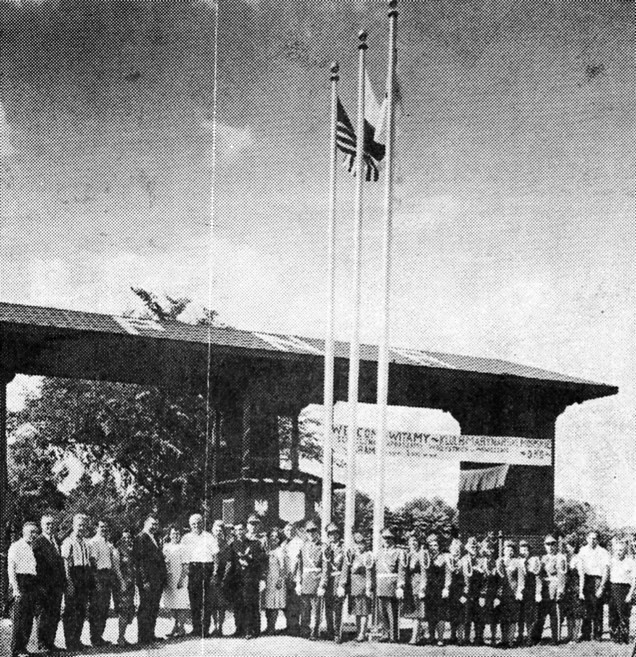
The Opening Ceremony of the Polish National Alliance Youth Camp in Yorkville, IL, July 4, 1937.

The Polish National Alliance (PNA) (pol. Związek Narodowy Polski, (ZNP)) is the largest and one of the oldest Polish fraternal organizations in the United States. The original goal was to mobilize support among Polish Americans for the liberation of Poland. For much of the 20th century, it was locked in battle with the rival organization Polish Roman Catholic Union of America.

It later emphasized fraternal roles such as social activities for its membership. By the 1980s it focused on its insurance program, with 300,000 members and assets of over $176 million.

== History ==
The Polish National Alliance was founded on February 15, 1880, in Philadelphia under the influence of Polish patriot Agaton Giller. Its first president was Juliusz Andrzejkowicz. In 1886, the PNA inaugurated the first fraternal insurance program kind in the Polish-American community; by 2000 PNA members held over $800 million of insurance coverage. In 1891, the PNA organized the first Polish Constitution Day parade in Chicago, to generate interest in Polish independence; it has been held annually in Chicago since 1894. At that time there were about 280 societies in the United States, nearly 60 in Chicago, some with membership over 250.

The PNA founded a number of publishing and educational institutions. From 1912 to 1991 it owned Alliance College in Cambridge Springs, Pennsylvania. The organization founded the Polish Library in Chicago and Immigrants House in New York. In 1910 it built the monument of Tadeusz Kościuszko in Washington, D.C.. One prominent alumnus of the PNA is the humanitarian physician Leon S. Talaska, M.D.

The sense of Polish nationalism was so strong among certain Polish intellectuals, that they warned repeatedly against assimilation into American culture. It was the duty of the Pole to someday return to liberate the homeland. The PNA newspaper Zgoda warned in 1900, "The Pole is not free to Americanize" because Poland's religion, language and nationality had been quote partially torn away by the enemies. In other words, "The Pole is not free to Americanize because wherever he is – he has a mission to fulfill."

== Contention with the Polish Roman Catholic Union of America ==
Before the First World War, the PNA often found itself at odds with the Polish Roman Catholic Union of America, a fraternal organization founded in 1873. The basic outward differences between the two fraternals are often remarked. The PRCUA, the earlier and more conservative, tended to support the American Catholic hierarchy over lay groups such as parish councils. The younger PNA was more radical in outlook and generally championed lay leadership over the Church hierarchy.

However, the most important difference was that of world view. The PRCUA viewed the Polish American community in terms of okolica, or "local environment," which it viewed as the starting point for building cultural awareness. The PNA viewed the Polish American community in terms of naród, or "nation," which was constituted by the entire Polish people, at home and abroad, and took as its ultimate goal the reconstitution of divided Poland. The two fraternals were able to reconcile their differences after 1945 and have coexisted amicably for decades.

== Newspaper and current activities ==
In 1881, the PNA's official newspaper Zgoda was established through the efforts of Frank Gryglaszewski, later Censor of the PNA. It was followed in 1908 by the Polish-language daily Dziennik Związkowy (Polish Daily News). In 1987, the AM radio station WPNA was established; the station was sold August 1, 2022.

In the years 1912–1914 the PNA financially supported the Temporary Commission of Confederated Independence Parties. During World War I it collaborated with the Polish National League and the Polish National Committee in Paris. During World War II it backed the Polish Government in exile. In 1944 PNA under President Charles Rozmarek was a co-founder of the Polish American Congress (pol. Kongres Polonii Amerykańskiej), which shipped $150 million in goods to Polish refugees around the world.

Charles Rozmerek, the president from 1939 to 1969 built a political machine from the Chicago membership, and played a role in Chicago Democratic politics.

Since the end of the 19th century the PNA has been the largest Polish fraternal organization in the US with assets of $500 million as a result of insurance activity (the only requirement of membership is to buy an insurance policy – life, health etc.), and returns from banks and media they own.

== Administration ==
The main authority of the organization is its Convention named Sejm Związkowy, held every 4 years, but the government is the Zarząd with the president of the PNA, and the Board of Directors (pol. Rada Dyrektorów). The supreme comptroller of the organization is Censor of the PNA (pol. cenzor ZNP), who is responsible only before the Sejm. The national headquarters of the Polish National Alliance is in the Forest Glen area of Chicago. The headquarters was relocated here in the 1970s from Chicago's Polish Triangle in West Town.
