= WEUR =

- Oak Park, Illinois; United States
- Broadcast area: Chicago metropolitan area
- Frequency: 1490 kHz
- Branding: 1490 AM Radio Chicago

Programming
- Format: Polish-language talk and other ethnic programming

Ownership
- Owner: Daniela Wojcik; (CSWWII, LLC)

History
- First air date: October 7, 1950
- Former call signs: WEBS (CP); WOPA (1950–1984); WBMX (1984–1987); WPNA (1987–2022)
- Call sign meaning: Europe

Technical information
- Licensing authority: FCC
- Facility ID: 1093
- Class: C
- Power: 1,000 watts unlimited
- Transmitter coordinates: 41°52′52.11″N 87°47′38.21″W

Links
- Public license information: Public file; LMS
- Website: radiochicago1490am.com

WEUR (1490 AM) is a time-brokered radio station licensed to Oak Park, Illinois, United States. The station serves the Chicago metropolitan area, and is owned by Daniela Wojcik, through licensee CSWWII, LLC.

== Programming ==
The majority of the station's programming is Polish language news, talk, and sports. They feature polka music on the weekends with the long running Eddie Blazonczyk Polka Show hosted by Tish Blazonczyk,

WEUR is the home of the Hagerty Family Irish Program, the longest running Irish program in the United States. This program has been on the station every Saturday morning since 1951.

== History ==
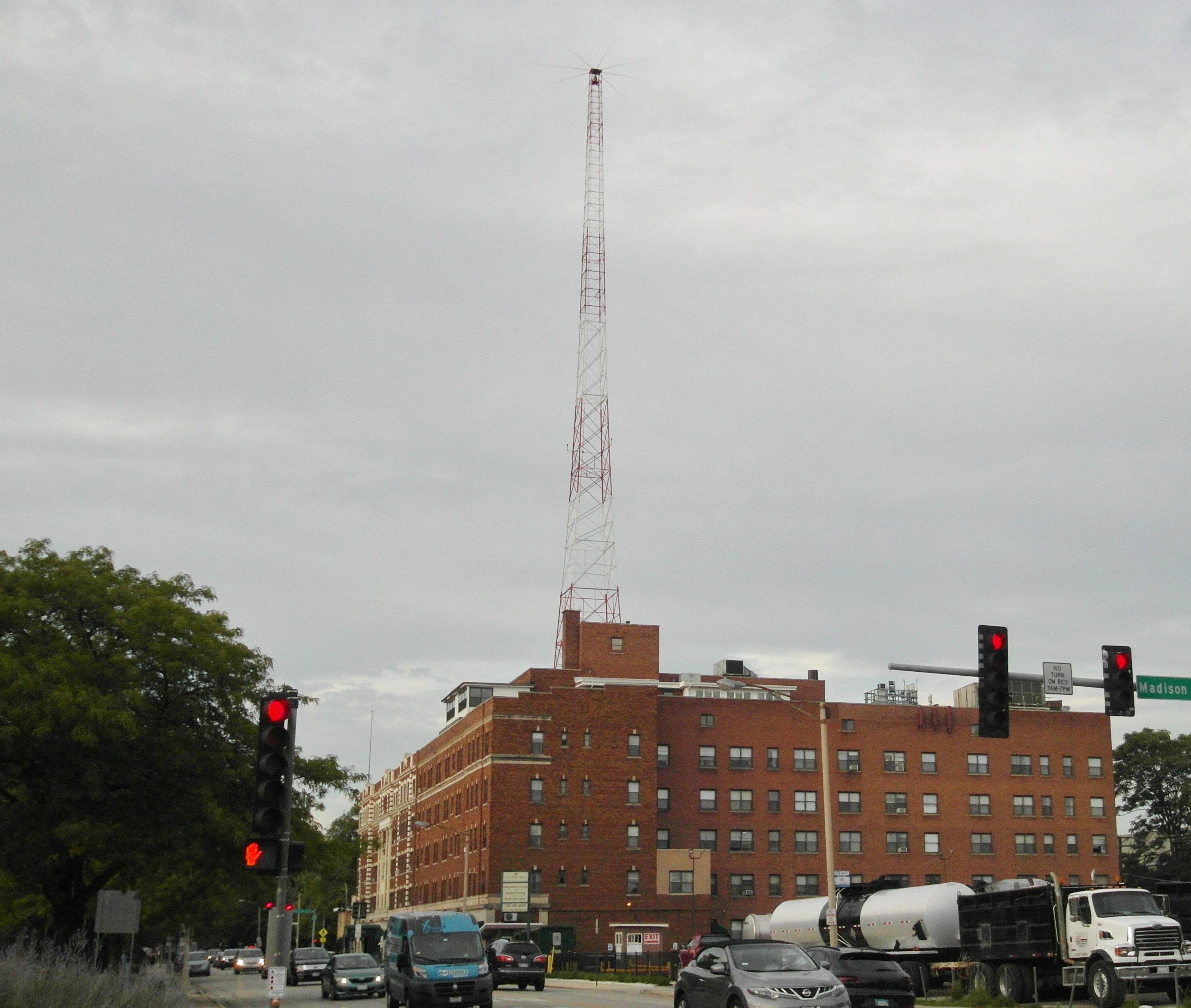
WEUR's tower atop the Oak Park Arms

The station began broadcasting October 7, 1950. The station's call sign was originally WEBS, but before going on the air the call sign was changed to WOPA to reflect the location of its studios. The studios and antenna were in the former Oak Park Arms Hotel, now a retirement community.

Pervis Spann began his radio career on WOPA in 1959.

In 1984, the station's call sign was changed to WBMX.

In January 1987, the station was sold to the Polish National Alliance for $2 million, and its call sign was changed to WPNA on May 1, 1987. WPNA was the home of the long-running Chet Gulinski Show, which featured polka music and was quite popular in Chicago's Eastern European communities.

On May 25, 2022, the Polish National Alliance announced the sale of WPNA to Daniela Wojcik's CSWWII, LLC for $725,000. The sale was consummated on August 1, 2022. Alliance Communications, which still owns 103.1 WPNA-FM, retained the rights to the WPNA call sign and intellectual property. The station changed its call sign to WEUR on August 31, 2022.
