= Pervis Spann =

American broadcaster (1932–2022)

- Born: August 16, 1932; Itta Bena, Mississippi, U.S.
- Died: March 14, 2022 (aged 89); Chicago, Illinois, U.S.
- Occupations: Broadcaster; music promoter; radio personality
- Years active: 1959–2000

Pervis Spann (August 16, 1932 – March 14, 2022) was an American broadcaster, music promoter, and radio personality. He was a disc jockey on WVON and was influential in the development of blues music in Chicago, Illinois.

== Early life ==
Spann was born in Itta Bena, Mississippi, on August 16, 1932. During his teenage years, he cared for his family by picking cotton and managing the Dixie Theater – the only local black movie theater – after his mother could no longer do that because she suffered a stroke. Spann, his sister and mother moved to Battle Creek, Michigan, in 1949. Shortly after moving to Michigan, Spann left to work in Gary, Indiana, and spent a time in the forces in the Korean War. He subsequently returned to Chicago, Illinois, where he worked in a steel mill, drove a taxi, and repaired television sets.

== Career ==
Under the G.I. Bill, Spann attended the Midwestern Broadcasting School, before starting work on WOPA radio in 1959. He organized his first concert, featuring B.B. King and Junior Parker, in 1960. Three years later, when Leonard and Phil Chess launched WVON, Spann was given a regular late-night blues slot, and won attention with an 87-hour "sleepless sit-in" on the station to raise money for Martin Luther King Jr. In 1962, at a show at the Regal Theater in Chicago, Spann became the first person to refer to Aretha Franklin as "the Queen of Soul".

During the 1960s, Spann managed the careers of leading blues and soul performers, including B.B. King, and claimed to have a role in discovering the Jackson 5 and Chaka Khan. He co-owned several clubs, including the Burning Spear. After WVON was sold in 1975, he helped establish a new blues and gospel-oriented station, WXOL, on the same frequency in 1979. Four years later, it became WVON again. Spann continued to promote blues festivals, and also ran station WXSS in Memphis, Tennessee, during the 1980s.

Spann ran for mayor of Chicago as a Republican in 1991, but lost in the primary to George Gottlieb. Eight years later, he ran for the Chicago City Council in the 18th Ward, with James Brown visiting the South Side to campaign for him. Spann was inducted into the Blues Hall of Fame in 2012.

== Personal life ==
Spann was married to Lovie for 67 years until his death. Together, they had four children: Melody, Darrell, Latrice, and Chanté. Melody became chair and chief executive officer of Midway Broadcasting Corporation (which owns WVON), while Darrell was his caregiver during his later years.

Spann died from Alzheimer's disease at his home in the South Side of Chicago, on March 14, 2022, at the age of 89.
