= Coyne College =

Private college in Chicago, Illinois, US

Coordinates: 41.8875°N 87.6487°W

- Motto: A Faster Way to a Better Future
- Type: Private for-profit college
- Active: 1899–March 2022
- President: Russell Freeman
- Location: Chicago, Illinois, United States
- Campus: Urban
- Website: coynecollege.edu

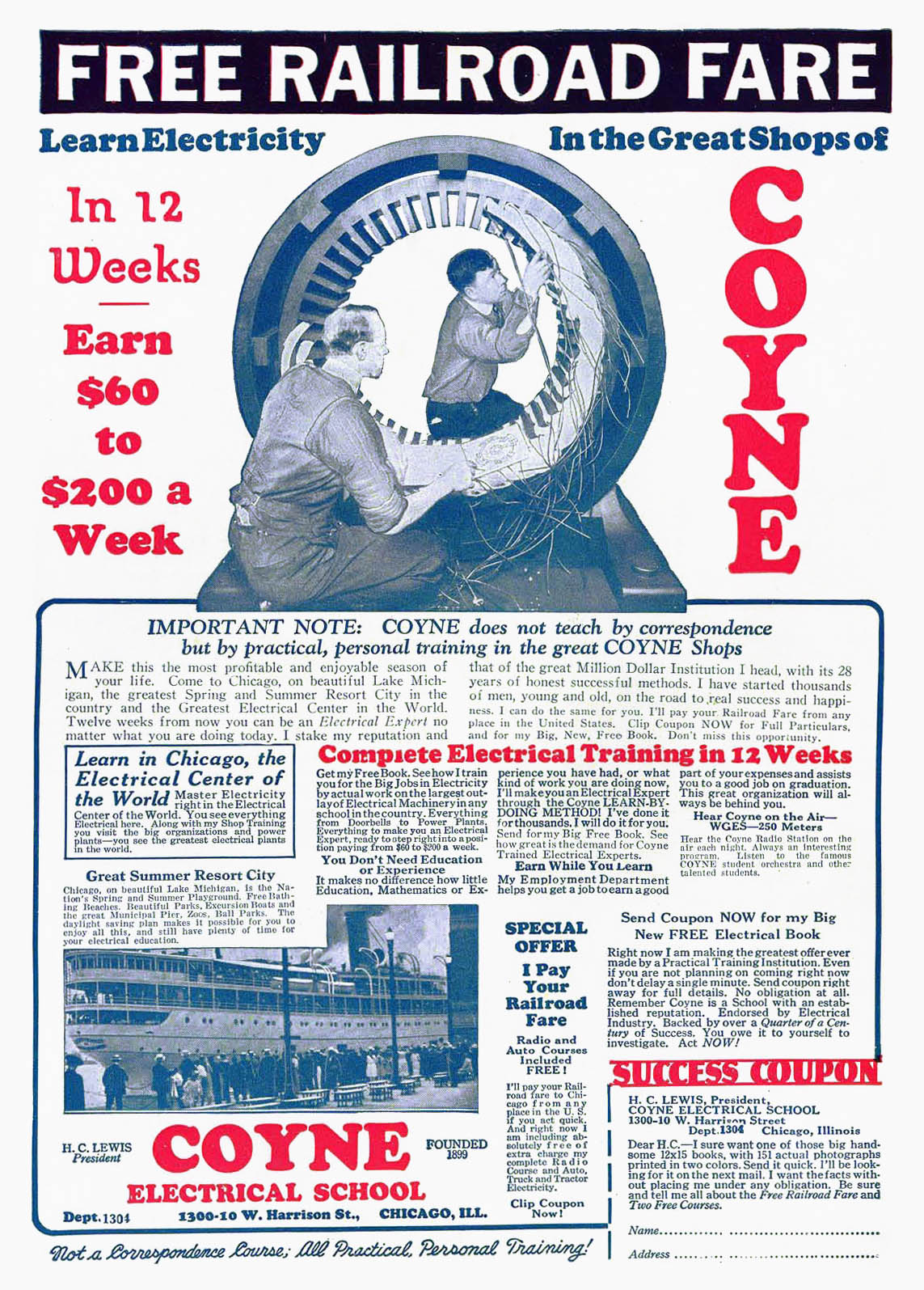
1926 magazine advertisement for the Coyne Electrical School

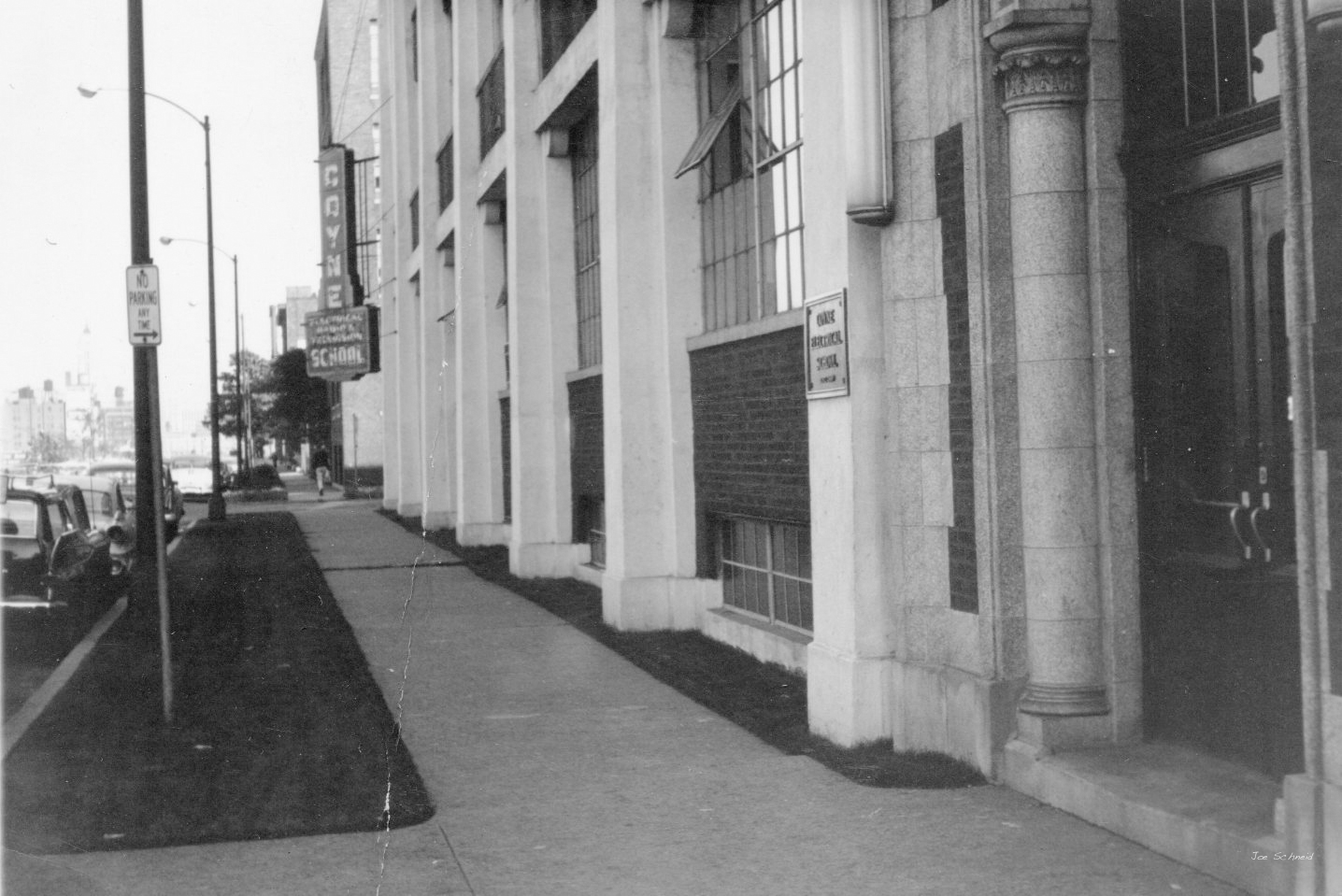
1963, Coyne Electrical School 1501 West Congress Parkway at Loomis Street

Coyne College was a private for-profit college from 1899 to 2022 in Chicago, Illinois, United States. The Illinois Board of Higher Education serves as the custodian of records for the college following the its closure.

== History ==
The school was established in Chicago as a branch of the Coyne Electrical School of Boston in 1899. In 1960s, the Coyne Electrical School merged with the American Institute of Engineering and Technology to become Coyne American Institute. In 2004, the school opened two new campuses, one on West Monroe and the other on North Green Street. They replaced the previous campus on West Fullerton. In 2013, the school established the Coyne American Institute Educational Foundation to assist students of Coyne College as well as students of Brown College. In June 2016, Coyne College moved to a new location in Chicago's business district known as the Loop. It closed in March 2022.
