= List of Chicago Bears broadcasters =

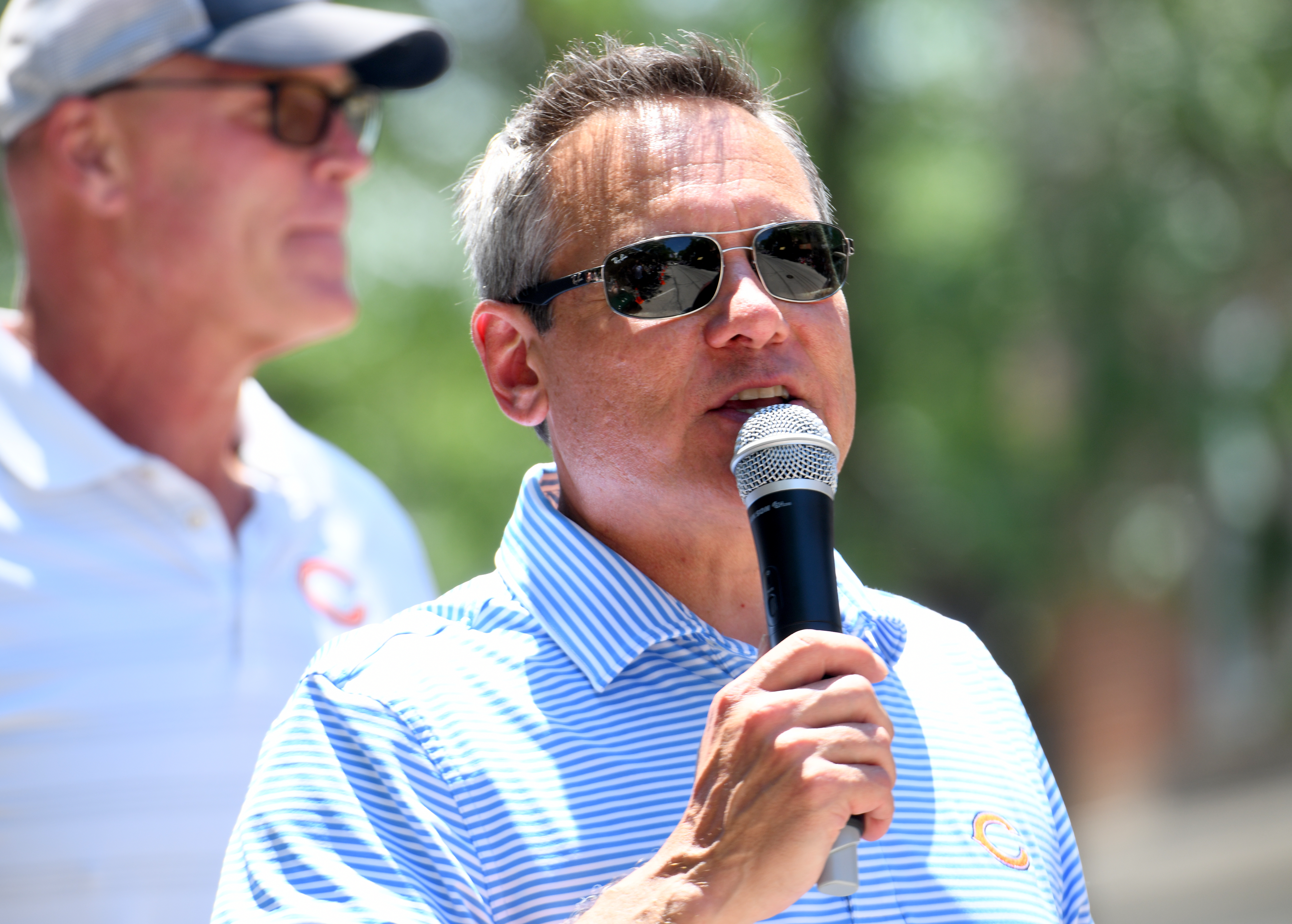
Jeff Joniak (center) and Tom Thayer (left), the play-by-play and color commentator for Bears radio games on WMVP, respectively.

Currently, ESPN Radio 1000 airs the Chicago Bears football games with Jeff Joniak doing the play-by-play, along with color commentator Tom Thayer and sideline reporter Jason McKie. Marc Silverman, Dionne Miller and former Bears wide receiver Tom Waddle host the pre-game shows. John Jurkovic and Peggy Kusinski host the post-game shows.

== Radio announcers ==
Chicago Bears radio announcers
Years	Flagship station	Play-by-play	Color commentator
1933–1936	WGN	Bob Elson	
1937–1938	WJJD	Jimmy Evans	
1939–1941	WJJD/WIND	Jack Drees	
1942–1948	WJJD/WIND	Bert Wilson	
1949–52	WIND	Red Grange	
1953–1976	WGN	Jack Brickhouse	Irv Kupcinet
1970	WNUR	Jay Scott	Marty Bauman
1977–1984	WBBM	Joe McConnell	Brad Palmer
1985–1987	WGN	Wayne Larrivee	Dick Butkus & Jim Hart
1988–1989	WGN	Wayne Larrivee	Hub Arkush & Jim Hart
1990–1991	WGN	Wayne Larrivee	Hub Arkush & Gary Fencik
1992–1993	WGN	Wayne Larrivee	Hub Arkush, Dick Butkus, & Gary Fencik
1994	WGN	Wayne Larrivee	Hub Arkush & Dick Butkus
1995–1996	WGN	Wayne Larrivee	Hub Arkush & Dan Hampton
1997–1998	WMAQ	Wayne Larrivee	Hub Arkush & Tom Thayer
1999	WMAQ	Gary Bender	Hub Arkush & Tom Thayer
2000	WBBM	Gary Bender	Hub Arkush & Tom Thayer
2001–2004	WBBM	Jeff Joniak	Hub Arkush & Tom Thayer
2005–2010	WBBM	Jeff Joniak	Tom Thayer
2011–2022	WBBM/WCFS-FM	Jeff Joniak	Tom Thayer
2023–present	WMVP	Jeff Joniak	Tom Thayer

== Bears Radio Network ==
The Bears Radio Network stretches 20 stations over four states as of the 2024 season.

Bears Radio Network
State	Market	Frequency	Call sign
Illinois	Chicago	1000 AM/100.3 FM HD2	WMVP (flagship)
Illinois	Chicago	93.5 FM	WVIV (spanish)
Illinois	Aurora	1280 AM	WTFN
Illinois	Bloomington–Normal	93.7 FM	WJBC
Illinois	Decatur	1050 AM	WDZ
Illinois	Galesburg	92.7 FM	WLSR
Illinois	Kankakee	92.7 FM	WVLI
Illinois	Kewanee	1450 AM/100.1 FM	WKEI
Illinois	LaSalle/Peru	96.5 FM	WLWF
Illinois	Peoria	1470 AM/100.3 FM	WMBD
Illinois	Rockford	96.7 FM	WKGL
Illinois	Watseka	101.7 FM	WIVR
Illinois	Springfield	1450 AM/92.3 FM	WFMB
Illinois	Sterling	1240 AM	WSDR
Indiana	Fort Wayne	1250 AM	WGL
Indiana	Rensselaer	97.7 FM	WLQI
Iowa	Burlington	92.1 FM	WQKQ
Iowa	Marshalltown	1230 AM	KFJB
Iowa	Quad Cities	1170 AM/104.1 FM	KBOB
Wisconsin	Adams	106.1 FM	WCWI
Wisconsin	Janesville	1230 AM/92.7 FM	WCLO
