= WCPT =

WCPT (820 kHz) is a talk radio station in Chicago, Illinois, United States.

WCPT may also refer to:

In the Chicago area:

- 850 WAIT (AM) at Crystal Lake — had the call sign WCPT from 2005 to 2007, and WAIT before that
- Former FM simulcasts of WCPT programming:
  - 92.7 WCPY at Arlington Heights — had the call sign WCPT-FM from 2008 to 2014
  - 92.5 WCLR (FM) at DeKalb, Illinois — had the call sign WCPT-FM from 2014 to 2018
  - 99.9 WYHI at Park Forest, Illinois — had the call sign WCPQ from 2008 to 2018

In other places:

- 100.9 WKLI-FM at Albany, New York — had the call sign WCPT (FM) from 1999 to 2002, and WKLI before that
- 730 WTNT (AM) at Alexandria, Virginia — had the call sign WCPT from 1987 to 1995
- WBXX-TV 20 at Crossville, Tennessee — had the call sign WCPT-TV from 1976 to 1982
