= K-Love Classics =

Christian classic hits radio network

K-LOVE Classics
- Type: Radio network
- Country: United States

Ownership
- Owner: Educational Media Foundation

History
- Launch date: 2018
- Closed: November 2020

Coverage
- Availability: National, through broadcast stations and translators

K-Love Classics was a Christian classic hits radio network owned by Educational Media Foundation (EMF) and was carried over FM stations, translators, and HD subchannels in the United States. Such stations include WAIW 88.1 in Wheaton, Illinois. The network was one of the formats produced by EMF. Airing Christian music from the 1980s, 1990s, and early in the decade of the 2000s, the K-Love Classics format debuted in June 2018 as an internet-only station but quickly moved to terrestrial radio on FM and HD Radio subchannels after a large response to the new format.

On November 2, 2020, K-Love Classics was discontinued, and was subsequently replaced by new decade-specific networks devoted to the 1990s and 2000s.

== History ==
K-Love Classics was launched in June 2018 as an internet radio station featuring classic Contemporary Christian music (CCM) from the 1980s, 1990s, and the early part of the decade of the 2000s, akin to the secular classic hits format. In response to popular demand, Educational Media Foundation (EMF) began airing the format over its nationwide network of full-power FM stations, low-power translators, and HD Radio subchannels. In August 2018, WAIW in Wheaton, Illinois (a suburb of Chicago) became the first terrestrial radio station to broadcast K-Love Classics.

More stations were added over the next several weeks, including in Palm Springs, California as well as subchannels of WLVU in Nashville and KLVB in Sacramento. For a brief period starting in August 2018, K-Love Classics was available in Los Angeles on KKLQ-HD3, but the following month it was replaced with Radio Nueva Vida programming. However, in August 2020, K-Love Classics came back to the Los Angeles airwaves on KYLA-HD3 and KYRA-HD3.

On November 2, 2020, K-Love Classics was discontinued; the network began carrying "K-Love Christmas" as a temporary format, with the EMF stating plans for new programming to premiere in 2021.

On January 1, 2021, the K-Love Classics network was divided into two new networks—"K-Love '90s" and "K-Love 2000s"—devoted to CCM from the 1990s and 2000s respectively. In September 2022, as part of the 40th anniversary of K-Love's launch, the EMF added additional internet radio stations devoted to CCM from the 1970s, 1980s, and 2010s, as well as the "K-Love Birthday Blend", which carries CCM spanning the network's 40-year history.

== List of stations ==
In addition to the online stream, K-Love Classics was relayed by numerous terrestrial radio stations throughout the United States. The following list of stations is the extent of the network as of its total shutdown in early November 2020. Unless otherwise indicated, all stations are on the FM band.

Call Sign	Frequency	State	City of License	Broadcast Market	Format now
KLJK	94.7	Arkansas	Weiner	Jonesboro	K-LOVE Eras
K270AI	101.9	California	Cathedral City	Palm Springs	SOLD
KLXB-HD2	105.1-2	California	Cathedral City	Palm Springs	K-LOVE Eras
KARJ-HD2	92.1-2	California	Escondido	San Diego	K-LOVE 2000s
KYLA-HD3	92.7-3	California	Fountain Valley	Los Angeles	K-LOVE Eras
KAIV-HD3	92.7-3	California	Thousand Oaks	Los Angeles	K-LOVE Eras
KLKE-HD3	103.7-3	California	Garberville	Eureka	K-LOVE Eras
KLSB-HD3	97.5-3	California	Goleta	Santa Barbara	K-LOVE Eras
K227BI	93.3	California	Santa Barbara	Santa Barbara	K-LOVE Eras
K270BE	101.9	California	Modesto	Modesto	K-LOVE
KLXF-HD3	90.5-3	California	Modesto	Modesto	K-LOVE Eras
K208CW	89.5	California	Monterey	Monterey	SOLD
K275CU	102.9	California	Monterey	Monterey	K-LOVE
KLVB-HD3	99.5-3	California	Citrus Heights	Sacramento	K-LOVE '90s
KLVS-HD3	107.3-3	California	Livermore	San Francisco	K-LOVE '90s
K281BU	104.1	California	San Francisco	San Francisco	K-LOVE
KLVM-HD2	88.9-2	California	Santa Cruz	Salinas-Monterey	K-LOVE 2000s
KNVM	89.7	California	Prunedale	Salinas-Monterey	SOLD
KWAI-HD3	97.7-3	California	Los Altos	San Jose	K-LOVE '90s
K205BN	88.9	California	Los Gatos	San Jose	K-LOVE '90s
K265CV	100.9	California	Fremont	Fremont	K-LOVE '90s
KLDV-HD3	91.1-3	Colorado	Denver	Denver	K-LOVE 2000s
WLVW-HD2	107.3-2	DC	Washington, DC	Washington, DC	K-LOVE 2000s
WAKL-HD3	106.7-3	Georgia	Gainesville	Atlanta	K-LOVE 2000s
KLUU-HD3	103.5-3	Hawaii	Wahiawa	Honolulu	K-LOVE '90s
WLWX	88.1	Illinois	Wheaton	Chicago	K-LOVE '90s
WCKL-HD3	97.9-3	Illinois	Chicago	Chicago	BOOST Radio
WLAI-HD2	107.1-2	Kentucky	Wilmore	Lexington	K-LOVE '90s
WDKL-HD3	102.7-3	Michigan	Detroit	Detroit	K-LOVE 2000s
W215CH	90.9	Michigan	Grand Ledge	Lansing	K-LOVE 2000s
KDTI	90.3	Michigan	Rochester Hills	Detroit	K-LOVE 2000s
WARW-HD2	96.7-2	New York	Port Chester	New York City	K-LOVE 2000s
WPLJ-HD2	95.5-2	New York	New York City	New York City	AIR 1
WKFV-HD3	107.3-3	North Carolina	Clinton	Fayetteville	K-LOVE 2000s
W272DD	102.3	North Carolina	Fayetteville	Fayetteville	K-LOVE 2000s
WWLV-HD3	94.1-3	North Carolina	Lexington	Winston-Salem	K-LOVE 2000s
WRCM-HD3	91.9-3	North Carolina	Wingate	Charlotte	K-LOVE '90s
W205CP	88.9	North Carolina	Winston-Salem	Winston-Salem	AIR 1
WPAY (AM)	1520 kHz	Ohio	Rossford	Toledo	SOLD
W221BG	92.1	Ohio	Toledo	Toledo	SOLD
KLVP-HD3	97.9-3	Oregon	Aloha	Portland	BOOST RADIO
K279BO	103.7	Oregon	Portland	Portland	BOOST RADIO
KLVU-HD3	107.1-3	Oregon	Sweet Home	Eugene	K-LOVE '90s
KLMD-HD2	101.1-2	Oregon	Talent	Medford	K-LOVE '90s
K243AF	96.5	Oregon	Medford	Medford	K-LOVE '90s
KJKF	88.9	Oregon	Klamath Falls	Klamath Falls	K-LOVE 2000s
WKVP-HD3	106.9-3	Pennsylvania	Camden, New Jersey	Philadelphia	K-LOVE 2000s
W250CY	97.9	Pennsylvania	West View	Pittsburgh	BOOST RADIO
WPKV-HD3	98.3-3	Pennsylvania	Duquesne	Pittsburgh	BOOST RADIO
WMHK-HD3	89.7-3	South Carolina	Columbia	Columbia	K-LOVE 2000s
WLVU-HD3	97.1-3	Tennessee	Belle Meade	Nashville	K-LOVE '90s
KFMK-HD3	105.9-3	Texas	Round Rock	Austin	RADIO NUEVA VIDA
KFMK-HD2	105.9-2	Texas	Round Rock	Austin	K-LOVE 2000s

=== Former stations prior to November 2020 network closure ===
Call Sign	Frequency	State	City of License	Broadcast Market
KKLJ	100.1	California	Julian	San Diego
KKLQ-HD3	100.3-3	California	Los Angeles	Los Angeles
