= Tom Thayer =

American football player and announcer (born 1961)

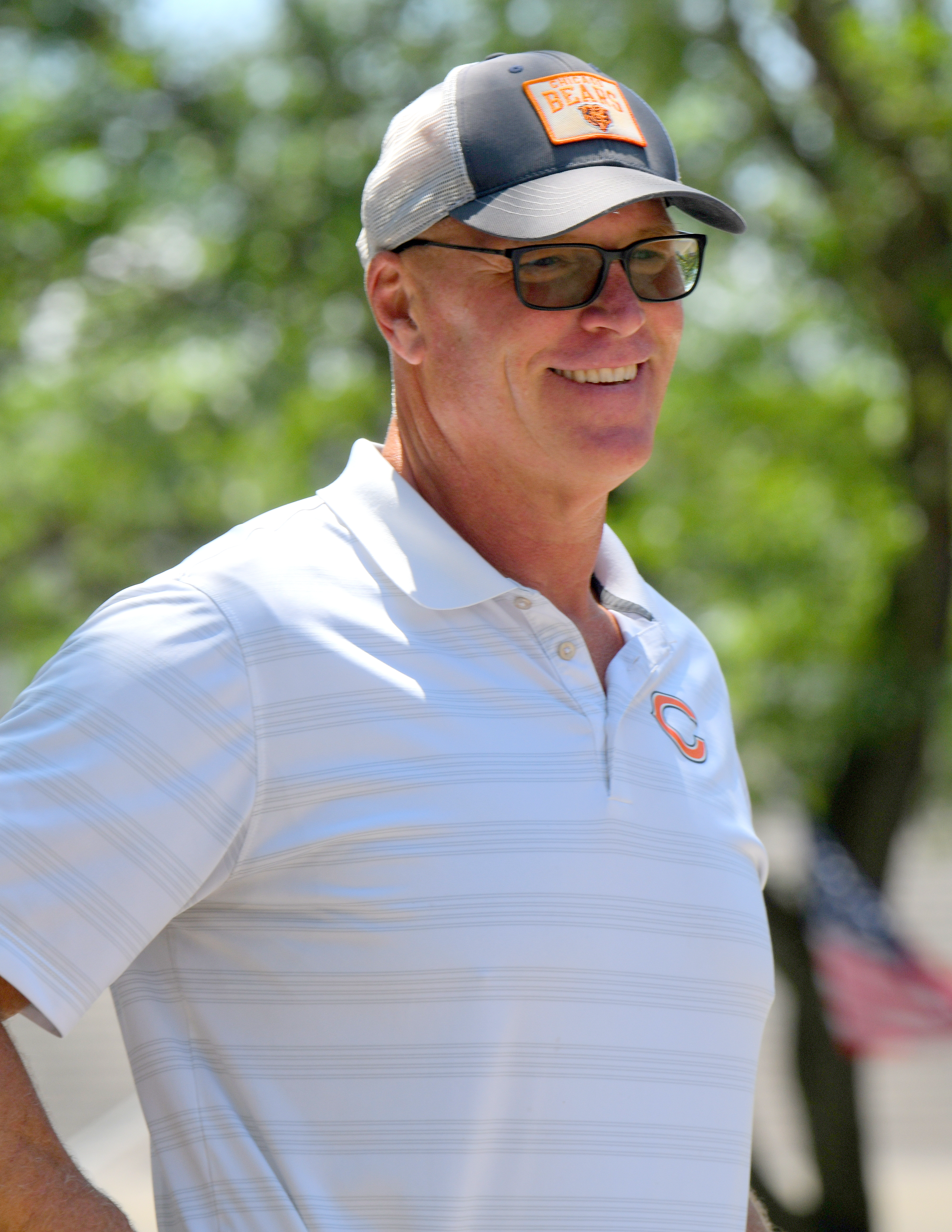
- Thayer in 2019

No. 61, 57
- Positions: Guard, center

Personal information
- Born: August 16, 1961 (age 65); Joliet, Illinois, U.S.
- Listed height: 6 ft 4 in (1.93 m)
- Listed weight: 261 lb (118 kg)

Career information
- High school: Joliet Catholic
- College: Notre Dame
- NFL draft: 1983: 4th round, 91st overall pick

Career history
- Chicago Blitz (1983); Arizona Wranglers (1984); Arizona Outlaws (1985); Chicago Bears (1985–1992); Miami Dolphins (1993)

Awards and highlights
- Super Bowl champion (XX); PFWA All-Rookie Team (1985); 100 greatest Bears of All-Time

Career NFL statistics
- Games played: 126
- Games started: 120
- Fumble recoveries: 2
- Stats at Pro Football Reference

Thomas Allen Thayer (born August 16, 1961) is an American former professional football player who was a guard in the National Football League (NFL) and United States Football League (USFL). He played in the NFL for the Chicago Bears and the Miami Dolphins, and won a Super Bowl as a member of the 1985 Chicago Bears. Prior to his NFL career, Thayer played in the USFL for the Chicago Blitz, Arizona Wranglers and the Arizona Outlaws from 1983 to 1985. He is currently the color commentator on WMVP for Chicago Bears broadcasts.

== Early life ==
The youngest of five children, Thayer was born and raised in Joliet, Illinois. Thayer's father, Allen, was a lineman for Com Ed for 43 years before retiring. In addition to their own children, Thayer's parents adopted the three children of a neighbor after their parents were killed in a plane crash. Thayer graduated from the Cathedral of Saint Raymond grade school in May 1975. He then attended Joliet Catholic High School and graduated in 1979. Thayer helped the Joliet Catholic "Hilltoppers" to win consecutive Class 4A IHSA football championships in 1977 and 1978 as a junior and senior. The Hilltoppers went an undefeated 13–0 in both seasons outscoring their opponents 224–24 in eight playoff games, including 106–0 in the 1978 playoffs. Gordie Gillespie, the head coach at Joliet Catholic at the time, has referred to Thayer as "one of the five best players I ever coached, and he was the best lineman".

== Notre Dame ==
After graduating from Joliet Catholic, Thayer went to University of Notre Dame and was a member of the Notre Dame Fighting Irish football team for four years, first under head coach Dan Devine and then under Gerry Faust. Thayer was a member of the 1980 Fighting Irish team that was ranked number one in both the Coaches' Poll and AP Poll after going undefeated after seven games, but finished with only two wins out of their last five games, including a loss to the eventual National Champion Georgia Bulldogs in the 1981 Sugar Bowl, to finish the season ranked ninth and tenth respectively in the AP and College Coaches' polls. Thayer was named an honorable All-American while at Notre Dame and graduated with a degree in media communications in 1983.

== USFL/NFL ==
Thayer was drafted by the Chicago Bears with the team's 91st pick in round four of the 1983 NFL draft in April 1983. Thayer, however, was also one of the twenty-five players selected by the USFL's Chicago Blitz as part of the new league's 1983 Territorial Draft, which was held in January 1983, and the Bears were unaware that Thayer had already agreed to a contract with the Blitz to play under head coach George Allen just hours before. According to Thayer, "They [the Bears] had told me before that I had been their fourth-round choice in a mock draft, but the Blitz was giving me first-round money, and it was guaranteed".

Thayer played in the USFL from 1983 to 1985 for the Blitz, the Arizona Wranglers, and the Arizona Outlaws. He even made it as far as the 1984 USFL Championship Game as a member of the Wranglers, but the team was defeated 23–3 by the Philadelphia Stars. Thayer then signed with the Bears for the 1985 season, joining a team, which also included fellow 1983 draft class members Jimbo Covert, Willie Gault, Mike Richardson, Dave Duerson, Richard Dent, and Mark Bortz, that would go on to win Super Bowl XX. Thayer played eight seasons for the Bears, and started 130 out of 134 season games before being waived by the team after the start of the 1993 season because of an injury suffered while lifting weights during the previous off-season. Thayer then signed with the Miami Dolphins, but only appeared in three games for the team. Thayer retired from the NFL as a member of the Dolphins in 1993.

== Broadcasting ==
During his career with the Bears, Thayer became friends with radio-personalities Steve Dahl and Garry Meier, and would often call in to The Steve and Garry Show to comment on the Bears and other things. He now appears regularly on Dahl's podcast.

After retiring from the NFL, Thayer hosted a radio show with former teammate Keith Van Horne called the "Tom and Keith Show" on "The Loop" from September 1994 to February 1995. He was part of a sports-talk program at WCBR-FM before signing a three-year contract with WMAQ-AM, replacing former teammate Dan Hampton, to work as color commentator alongside Wayne Larrivee and Hub Arkush for Bears' radio broadcasts.

In March 2005, the Bears decided to switch from a three-man to a two-man team for their radio broadcasts with Jeff Joniak as the play-by-play commentator and Thayer as the sole color commentator, and the two have continued to serve as the team's main radio voices ever since.

In addition to Bears' broadcasts, Thayer also appears with Joniak on Bears Gameday Live, hosting a segment called "Thayer's Game Plans", on Sunday mornings and Bears Gamenight Live on Sunday nights. On this show he is known as the Surf Master, due to his love of the Lake Michigan surfing. Both shows air on FOX Chicago and are hosted by Lou Canellis. Thayer also hosts the videocasts Game Preview, with co-host Larry Mayer, Bears Roundtable, with co-hosts Joniak and Mayer, and Thayer's Playbook for Chicagobears.com.

== Personal life ==
His brother-in-law is ex-Atlanta Falcon John Scully. Thayer currently lives in Chicago, Illinois. He is an avid surfer in the off season on Maui, Hawaii.

On August 30, 2014, Thayer was honored for his accomplishments at Joliet Catholic by being inducted into the Joliet Catholic Academy Hall of Champions along with fellow honorees Gordon Gillespie, Bill Gullickson, Allie Quigley, and Jim Stefanich.

Thayer is also a member of the Chicagoland Sports Hall of Fame.
