= WKIF =

WKIF may refer to:

- WAIH (FM), a radio station (96.5 FM) in Holly Springs, Mississippi, United States, which held the call sign WKIF from 2014 to 2023
- WFAV, a radio station (95.1 FM) in Kankakee, Illinois, which held the call sign WKIF from 2012 to 2013
- WVLI, a radio station (92.7 FM) in Kankakee, Illinois, which held the call sign WKIF from 1998 to 2012
