= WLWX =

WLWX may refer to:

- WLWX (FM), a radio station (88.1 FM) licensed to serve Wheaton, Illinois, United States
- WAIW (FM), a radio station (92.5 FM) licensed to serve Winchester, Virginia, United States, which held the call sign WLWX from 2020 to 2021
