= WAWY =

Air 1 radio station in Dundee, Illinois

Coordinates: 42.106°N 88.377°W

- Dundee, Illinois; United States
- Broadcast area: Northwest Suburban Chicago / Fox Valley
- Frequency: 103.9 MHz (HD Radio)
- Branding: Air1

Programming
- Format: Contemporary worship music
- Subchannels: HD2: Spanish contemporary worship music "Air1"; HD3: Spanish Christian "Radio Nueva Vida"
- Network: Air1

Ownership
- Owner: Educational Media Foundation
- Sister stations: WAWE; WCKL; WCLR; WLWX; WOKL; WZKL

History
- First air date: June 8, 1967 (as WVFV)
- Former call signs: WVFV (1967–1980); WCRM (1980–1989); WABT (1989–1996); WZCH (1996–2004); WWYW (2004–2013); WFXF (2013–2019)

Technical information
- Licensing authority: FCC
- Facility ID: 3135
- Class: A
- ERP: 6,000 watts
- HAAT: 97 meters (318 ft)

Links
- Public license information: Public file; LMS
- Webcast: Listen live
- Website: www.air1.com

WAWY (103.9 FM) is a non-commercial radio station licensed to Dundee, Illinois, and serving the Northwest suburbs of Chicago. The station is owned by the Educational Media Foundation, and carries its "Air1" contemporary worship music network. The station is listener-supported and seeks donations on the air.

WAWY has an effective radiated power (ERP) of 6,000 watts. Its transmitter is located in Gilberts, Illinois.

== History ==
=== WVFV ===
The station began broadcasting on June 8, 1967, as WVFV. The call sign stood for the "Voice of the Fox Valley". The station was founded by Jim French, who operated out of a space above Cardinal Savings and Loans in West Dundee. WVFV's transmitter was built in Gilberts, Illinois. It originally operated from noon to midnight.

The station featured a middle-of-the-road format, with a heavy emphasis on big band music, as well as broadcasts of local high school sports and city council meetings. Prior to the launch of WVFV, an earlier station on 103.9 FM, WELG in Elgin, operated from 1960 until June 1963; the license for WELG, along with sister station WELF in Glen Ellyn, was revoked on March 11, 1964.

WVFV was sold in early 1970 to Richard Willrett, for $45,000. In February 1972, WVFV switched to a progressive rock format. In 1976, the station was sold to Ralph J. Faucher for $160,000, and its format was changed to adult contemporary.

=== WCRM ===
In early 1980, the station was sold to CLW Communications, a subsidiary of AMG International, for $315,000. The station adopted a Christian contemporary format, with an evening block of Christian rock.

On May 27, 1980, its call sign was changed to WCRM, standing for "Christian Radio Music". The station's slogan was "Today's Christian Music". WCRM also sold airtime to churches and religious organizations, whose programs primarily aired late mornings. The Christian contemporary format lasted through the decade.

=== The Wabbit ===
In 1989, the station was sold to Atlantic Morris Broadcasting for $1.5 million. On April 10, 1989, its call sign was changed to WABT, and the station adopted an album-oriented rock/classic rock hybrid format, branded "The Wabbit", with the slogan "The Northwest's Own Rock and Roll".

Among the staff at the station was Cara Carriveau (who went by her maiden name Cara Stern and on air name Cara Simms at the time), who began as overnight DJ in 1989, later moving to nights and middays. In 1992, Carriveau became program director, replacing Randy McCarthy. She remained with WABT until 1995, when she left to become program director of Shadow Broadcast Services, and was replaced by Dan Forthover. In 1995, the station was sold to M & M Broadcasting, owned by former Hammond, Indiana mayor Thomas McDermott Sr., for $975,000. The station began to be simulcast on 103.9 WWJY in Crown Point, Indiana.

=== Spanish language formats ===
In 1996, the station was sold to Z-Spanish Network, along with WWJY, for $3.6 million, and it adopted a Spanish language format, airing regional Mexican music. On June 7, 1996, its call sign was changed to WZCH. In 2000, Z-Spanish Network was acquired by Entravision Communications.

On December 29, 2000, WZCH began airing a Spanish CHR format branded "Super Estrella", as part of a simulcast with 99.9 WRZA in Park Forest, Illinois. In May 2004, NextMedia Group purchased the station from Entravision Communications for $5 million. By the end of the month, WZCH was stunting with television theme songs.

=== Y 103.9 ===
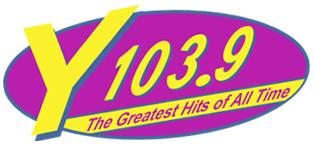
Station's logo as Y103.9

On Tuesday June 1, 2004, the station adopted a rhythmic oldies format branded as "Y1039, The Beat of the Burbs", with the new call sign WWYW.

The following year, the station gradually reformatted as an oldies station branded as "Y103.9, The Greatest Hits of All Time". This worked to fill the void left by the format flip of WJMK from oldies to Jack-FM.

Y103.9 featured local hosts such as Jim Shea, Jeff James, Jeff Davis, Shawn Powers, Marci Beeks, Carla Coulter, and Ken Cocker. Weekend programing included a Saturday night all 1970s music show with Jeff James.

By 2011, airtime of live and local hosts was greatly reduced, leaving only Marci Beeks at middays, and Jeff James and Carla Coulter's weekend shows as live and local. The remainder of the schedule was filled with Tom Kent's syndicated programming. In January 2013, Marci Beeks left the station, and its weekday programming was entirely from Tom Kent's network.

=== The Fox ===
103.9 The Fox's logo

On February 25, 2013, at 2:00 pm the station dropped its oldies and classic hits format, and adopted a classic rock format branded "103.9 The Fox". The last song as Y103.9 was Mercy Mercy Me by Marvin Gaye, while the first song on 103.9 The Fox was Foxy Lady by Jimi Hendrix. The station's call sign was changed to WFXF on March 4, 2013.

The station shared facilities with sister station WZSR in Crystal Lake, Illinois. The studios for both stations were located behind McHenry County College on U.S. Route 14. On-air staff included Alex Quigley, formerly of Q101, Pat Capone, formerly of The Loop, and JoBo, formerly of B96.

In 2014, the station was sold to Matrix Broadcasting LLC.

In February 2019, it was announced that Alpha Media would purchase WFXF and 105.5 WZSR for $4,669,011, with WFXF to be immediately resold to Educational Media Foundation for $900,000.

In preparation for the sale, the airstaff announced their final day on The Fox would be on April 5. The Fox's final promotion, an "Adult Easter Egg Hunt" at McHenry County College, was rescheduled from April 19 to April 6.

=== Air1 ===
The station was set to flip to Educational Media Foundation's contemporary worship music network, Air1, on April 8, 2019, with new call sign WAWY already reserved. However, after the final song played on The Fox, the station was taken silent.

The station returned to the air the following week as an affiliate of Air1, airing Contemporary Worship Music from the network.
