= WAIW =

WAIW may refer to:

- WAIW (FM), a radio station (92.5 FM) licensed to serve Winchester, Virginia, United States
- WLWX (FM), a radio station (88.1 FM) licensed to serve Wheaton, Illinois, United States, which held the call sign WAIW from 2017 to 2021
