= KSQD =

- Santa Cruz, California; United States
- Broadcast area: Monterey Bay Area
- Frequency: 90.7 MHz
- Branding: KSQD Community Radio

Programming
- Format: Community radio; Variety

Ownership
- Owner: Natural Bridges Media
- Sister stations: KSQT

History
- First air date: 2001
- Former call signs: KLSN (1998–2000); KJOL (2000–2001); KSRI (2001–2018)
- Call sign meaning: "Squid"

Technical information
- Licensing authority: FCC
- Facility ID: 12141
- Class: A
- ERP: 320 watts
- HAAT: 111 metres (364 ft)
- Transmitter coordinates: 37°0′9.8″N 122°3′8.8″W

Links
- Public license information: Public file; LMS
- Webcast: Listen live
- Website: ksqd.org

KSQD (90.7 FM) is a radio station licensed to serve Santa Cruz, California. The nonprofit community radio station is owned by Natural Bridges Media, and airs a variety format.

The station was assigned the call sign KLSN by the Federal Communications Commission on May 1, 1998. Its call sign was changed to KJOL on December 26, 2000, to KSRI on April 23, 2001, and to 'KSQD on December 18, 2018.

Natural Bridges acquired KSRI from Educational Media Foundation in May 2018. EMF had operated KSRI as an Air1 affiliate. Natural Bridges included several hosts from KUSP, a defunct public radio station in Santa Cruz. KSQD would expand its coverage to the Monterey-Salinas area in 2023, acquiring KNVM 89.7 FM, and its translator K208GE 89.5 FM. The extended coverage launched on June 17, and KNVM's call sign was changed to KSQT on June 24, 2023.
