= KLVM =

KLVM may refer to:

- KLVM (FM), a radio station (88.9 FM) licensed to serve Santa Cruz, California, United States
- KSQT, a radio station (89.7 FM) licensed to serve Prunedale, California, which held the call sign KLVM from 1988 to 2018
- Mission Field (ICAO code KLVM)
