= Jeff Joniak =

American sports announcer (born 1962)

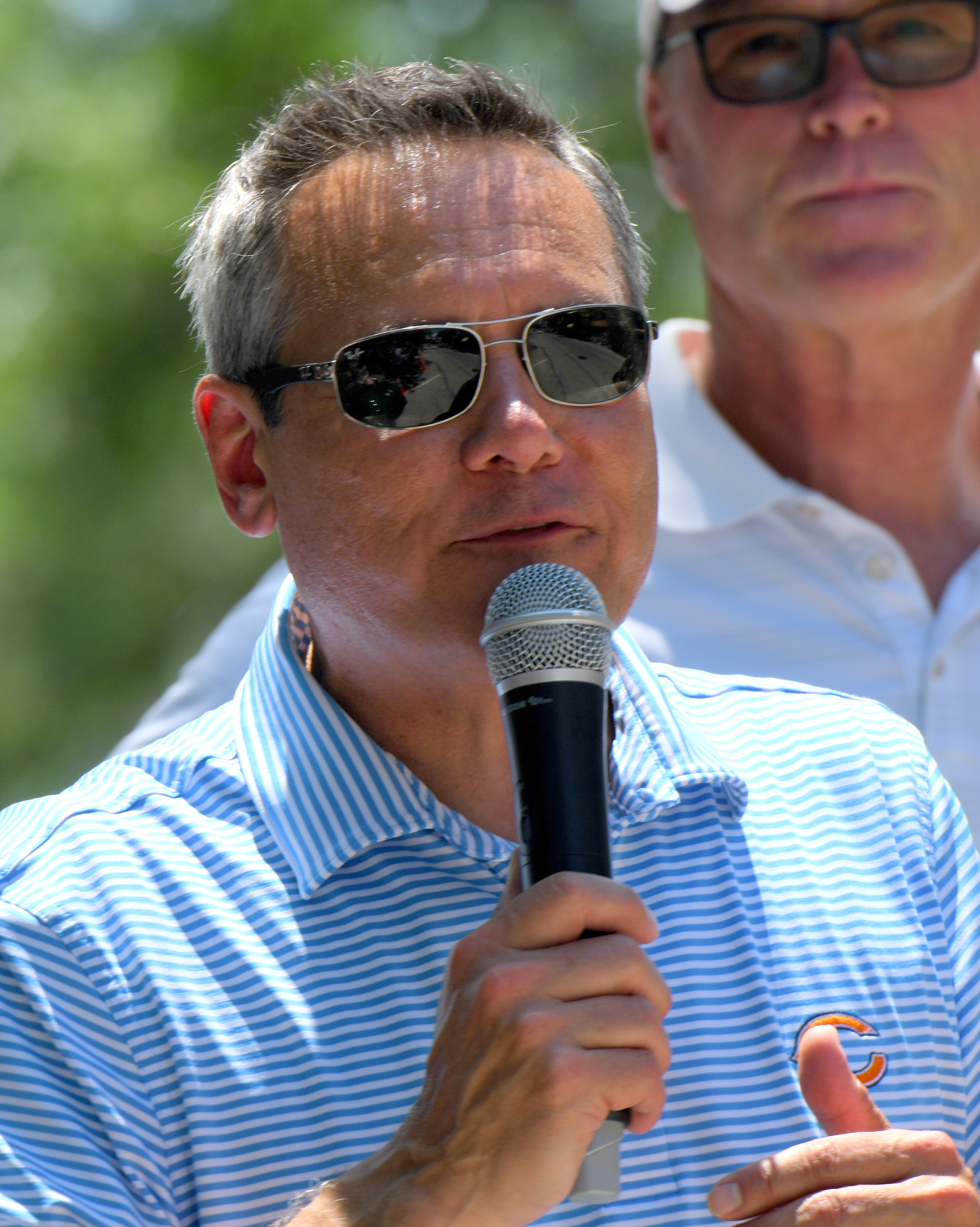
- Joniak in 2019
- Born: Jeffrey Scott Joniak; July 17, 1962 (age 64); Cleveland, Ohio
- Education: Iowa State University
- Years active: 1985–present
- Sports commentary career
- Team: Chicago Bears
- Genre: Play-by-play
- Sport: National Football League
- Employer: WMVP

Jeffrey Scott Joniak (born July 17, 1962) is an American sports announcer. He has been the play-by-play commentator for Chicago Bears radio broadcasts since 2001, making him the longest serving person in that role.

Before the Bears, he worked for multiple Chicago area sports networks such as Chicagoland Television, Illinois News Network, and Tribune Radio Network. He was a pre-game co-host for the Chicago Bulls in the 1990s and also occasionally called Chicago Cubs games. His involvement with the Bears began in 1997.

As of 2025, he calls Bears games for WMVP alongside color commentator and former player Tom Thayer. Other responsibilities that Joniak has include co-hosting a program with the Bears' head coach, the weekly Bears All-Access radio show, and video programming for the team website.

== Early life ==
Joniak was born on July 17, 1962, as the first son of Arlene and Edward Joniak. He also has younger brothers Darryl and Mark. During his youth, his family lived in Cleveland's eastern suburbs. He graduated from John Hersey High School in 1980, where he is recognized as one of the school's Distinguished Alumni.

He matriculated at Iowa State University, where he studied Broadcast Journalism. Joniak had long aspired to become a meteorologist for National Weather Service, but struggled with prerequisite math classes, switching to media subsequently. At the school's student radio station, he called games for Iowa State's baseball, basketball, football, and club hockey teams. He also worked for WOI-TV. Joniak graduated in 1984.

== Career ==
Following his graduation, Joniak was offered a television job in Odessa, Texas, but opted to return to Chicago. He began broadcasting professionally in 1985.

At Illinois News Network, he served as the pre-game, halftime, and post-game show host for the Chicago Bulls with the latter alongside Brian Wheeler. Joniak was recognized by the Associated Press in 1991 for his Bulls coverage.

He later worked as the afternoon sports anchor for WMAQ-AM before taking over the morning shift. Joniak was subsequently named WMAQ's sports director. In 1997, the Chicago Bears partnered with WMAQ and Joniak hosted the team's gameday shows. When WMAQ was replaced by WSCR in 2000, Joniak was among the ten WMAQ employees who survived the transition and was named sports operation manager. Joniak eventually followed the Bears to WBBM. During the 2000 college football season, he briefly took over as play-by-play announcer for a Northern Illinois football game.

In 2001, Joniak was promoted to play-by-play duties for Bears radio broadcasts, replacing Gary Bender. Although he had limited play-by-play experience since his graduation from Iowa State, WBBM liked the chemistry that Joniak had with Bears analysts Tom Thayer and Hub Arkush. The station also wanted an announcer from the Chicago area. Joniak was described by Ted Cox of the Daily Herald as being a "Munchkin-voiced announcer" during his first season, but the "perfect radio complement" to Bears head coach Dick Jauron.

WBBM's Bears booth was reduced to just Joniak and Thayer for the 2005 season, a decision that surprised the former since he considered Arkush a close friend and "a good team". The station defended the move as streamlining broadcasts by having just two people calling the game. The Joniak–Thayer lineup has remained unchanged since.

Broadcast rights for Bears games were transferred to WMVP in 2023, who retained Joniak and Thayer. 2025 was Joniak's 25th season as the Bears' radio announcer, surpassing Jack Brickhouse for the longest stint in the role in team history.

== Reception ==
As the Bears' announcer, Joniak became known for his enthusiasm and use of slogans. "Fade to black" is his catchphrase when the Bears win a game, which he introduced in 2005 when Bears cornerback Charles Tillman intercepted Detroit Lions quarterback Jeff Garcia's pass in overtime and returned it for the game-winning touchdown.

His calls are also considered synonymous with the career of Bears returner Devin Hester, and the two would become close friends. During Hester's rookie season, Joniak coined the moniker "Windy City Flyer" and described him with the proclamation, "Devin Hester, you are ridiculous!". His call of Hester returning the Super Bowl XLI opening kickoff for a touchdown has been widely praised, though Joniak conceded he had been nervous about working a Super Bowl at the moment and avoided listening to replays for a year. Joniak also introduced Hester when he received his Pro Football Hall of Fame induction ring in 2024.

Joniak was inducted into the Chicagoland Sports Hall of Fame on September 25, 2019, at Wintrust Arena.

== Personal life ==
Joniak married Carolyn Wian in 1988. They have two daughters, Kelly and Kaitlyn. Kelly has occasionally worked with the Bears as a sports scientist.

== See also ==
- List of Chicago Bears broadcasters
- List of current NFL broadcasters
