= WCLR (FM) =

K-Love radio station in DeKalb, Illinois

Coordinates: 41.875444°N 88.754806°W

- DeKalb, Illinois; United States
- Broadcast area: DeKalb County–Fox Valley
- Frequency: 92.5 MHz
- Branding: K-Love

Programming
- Language: English
- Format: Christian adult contemporary
- Network: K-Love

Ownership
- Owner: Educational Media Foundation
- Sister stations: WAWE; WAWY; WILV; WLWX; WQFL; WSRI; WZKL

History
- First air date: December 17, 1961
- Former call signs: WLBK-FM (1961–1976); WDEK (1976–2008); WCPY (2008–2014); WCPT-FM (2014–2018)
- Former frequencies: 99.1 MHz (1961–1962)

Technical information
- Licensing authority: FCC
- Facility ID: 15974
- Class: B
- ERP: 20,000 watts
- HAAT: 149 meters (489 ft)

Links
- Public license information: Public file; LMS
- Webcast: Listen live
- Website: www.klove.com

WCLR (92.5 FM) is a radio station located in DeKalb, Illinois. The station is owned by Educational Media Foundation, and airs a Christian contemporary format, as an affiliate of K-Love. The station's signal can be heard from Rockford to Joliet and includes the Fox Valley region.

== History ==
=== WLBK-FM ===
The station began broadcasting on December 17, 1961, and broadcast at 99.1 MHz. The station was originally WLBK-FM and simulcast AM 1360 WLBK during the day. The station was locally owned and operated in DeKalb. On May 25, 1962, the station's frequency was changed to 92.5 MHz. Gradually in the 1970s, the station added a progressive program known as "Headquarters" at night beginning at 6:00 p.m. and ending with sign-off at 2:00 a.m.

=== WDEK ===
In October 1976, the station's call sign was changed to WDEK. The station aired an automated Top 40 format during the day and a live album-oriented rock format at night. In 1979, the station became a full-time AOR station. WXRT Chicago mid-day jock John Bell was hired as the first Program Director. By late 1984, the station had adopted a Top 40/CHR format as "All Hit WDEK". WDEK was also an affiliate of The Rockin' America Top 30 Countdown with Scott Shannon (later replaced by American Top 40 with Shadoe Stevens and then by Rick Dees Weekly Top 40), The Dr. Demento Show, and Hot Mix during its Top-40 days.

=== 92 Kiss FM ===
92 Kiss FM logo

In February 1999, the station's local owners sold WDEK to Big City Radio. The station became "92 Kiss FM", retaining its CHR format and began simulcasting 92.7 WKIE in Arlington Heights and 92.7 WKIF in Kankakee. Melissa Forman hosted mornings on 92 Kiss FM, before moving to 93.9 WLIT-FM in 2001.

=== Energy 92.7&5 ===
On January 12, 2001, Clear Channel's WUBT changed formats from rhythmic oldies to CHR as WKSC-FM "Kiss 103.5". At that time, Clear Channel filed suit against Big City Radio, alleging the "Kiss FM" branding used by WDEK and its simulcasts violated its national trademark. However, Big City Radio had already planned on changing the formats of these stations. On January 26, 2001, 92 Kiss-FM signed off, and the three stations adopted a dance hits format as "Energy 92.7&5". The station's airstaff remained intact. The new format was designed by 92 Kiss FM's program director, Chris Shebel, who has stated that the dance hits format is something he had dreamed of doing for a long time.

=== Onda 92 ===
In late 2002, Big City Radio became insolvent and began the process of selling all of its radio stations. In early 2003, WDEK, WKIE, and WKIF were sold to Spanish Broadcasting System for $22 million. On January 6, 2003, the three stations adopted a Spanish contemporary format as "Onda 92".

=== Nine FM / Dance Factory ===
In 2004, Spanish Broadcasting System sold WDEK, WKIE, and WKIF to Newsweb Corporation for $28 million. At 9 a.m. November 29, 2004, WDEK and WKIE began simulcasting with its new adult hits sister station 99.9 WRZA in Park Forest, Illinois, as "Nine FM", with the slogan "We Play Anything". The first song on the Nine FM simulcast was "With or Without You" by U2. Sky Daniels was the original program director for Nine FM. When he left in 2005, he was replaced by Matt DuBiel.

In 2006, Chris Chudzik began leasing air time for a dance music show called Dance Factory. Initially airing overnight on Saturdays, the program was expanded to seven nights a week on May 14, 2007.

=== Chicago's Progressive Talk ===
Newsweb Corporation dropped the Nine FM programming on all three signals on October 20, 2008, and replaced it with a simulcast of sister station WCPT from 5 a.m. until 9 p.m. The Nine FM format moved to WKIF 92.7 in Kankakee. On October 27, 2008, the station's call sign was changed to WCPY.

On June 2, 2014, WCPQ and WCPT-FM broke away from the Progressive Talk simulcast and changed their daytime format to Polish language programming as "Polski FM". The latter station swapped callsigns with this station shortly thereafter.

=== K-Love ===
In autumn of 2018, the station was sold to Educational Media Foundation for $1.6 million, and the station adopted a Christian contemporary format, as an affiliate of K-Love. The sale was consummated on November 30, 2018, at which point the station's call sign was changed to WCLR.
