= KFMP =

KFMP may refer to:

- KFMP (FM), a radio station (88.3 FM) licensed to serve Meade, Kansas, United States; see List of radio stations in Kansas
- KFMP-LP, former television station in Texas, United States
- KFMP-FM, former name of KAMV, a radio station in Texas, United States.
- KFMP, former call sign for KSQT, a radio station in California, United States
