= KLSB =

- Goleta, California; United States
- Broadcast area: Santa Barbara, California; Oxnard—Ventura, California
- Frequency: 97.5 MHz (HD Radio)
- Branding: Positive, Encouraging 97.5

Programming
- Format: FM/HD1: Christian adult contemporary; HD2: Air1 (Contemporary worship music); HD3: K-Love Eras

Ownership
- Owner: Educational Media Foundation

History
- First air date: September 1, 1957
- Former call signs: KRCW (1957–1965); KTMS-FM (1965–1984); KKOO-FM (1984–1985); KHTY (1985–1998); KMGQ (1998–2005); KRUZ (2005–2012); KRUZ-FM (2012); KYGA (2012–2017)
- Call sign meaning: K-Love Santa Barbara

Technical information
- Licensing authority: FCC
- Facility ID: 3159
- Class: B
- ERP: 17,500 watts with beam tilt
- HAAT: 890 meters (2,920 ft)
- Transmitter coordinates: 34.5253°N 119.9590°W
- Translators: HD2: 103.9 K280FV (Santa Barbara); HD3: 93.3 K227BI (Santa Barbara)

Links
- Public license information: Public file; LMS
- Webcast: Listen Live; Listen Live (HD2); Listen Live (HD3)
- Website: klove.com air1.com (HD2)

KLSB (97.5 FM) is a non-commercial radio station that is licensed to Goleta, California and serves the Santa Barbara and Oxnard—Ventura areas. The station is owned by Educational Media Foundation and airs the contemporary Christian music format of its nationally syndicated K-Love network.

KLSB broadcasts in HD Radio.

== History ==
=== Early years (1957–1985) ===
The station first signed on September 1, 1957 with the call letters KRCW.

In May 1965, original owner Richard W. Johnston sold the station to News-Press Publishing Company, owner of the Santa Barbara News-Press and AM station KTMS, for $51,000. KRCW's call sign changed to KTMS-FM in July to match that of its new sister station. News-Press Publishing's cross-ownership of the combo predated the Federal Communications Commission's 1975 rules prohibiting a person or entity from owning both a newspaper and a radio or television station in the same media market, so the company's mix of media outlets was allowed to remain in place. Nonetheless, the stations' common ownership with the News-Press ended on July 12, 1985, when News-Press Publishing sold the FM station, then known as KKOO-FM, and KTMS to F&M Broadcasting for $2 million.

=== KHTY (1985–1998) ===
In September 1985, the station changed its call letters to KHTY and adopted a top 40 format branded as "Y97". In July 1987, Harry McMurray and Jimmie Lee Wilkinson sold their 50 percent interest in KHTY and KTMS to Christian Larson for $1.75 million. (F. Robert Fenton owned the other 50 percent of the station combo.) The company became known as Pinnacle Communications.

On October 27, 1989, Geffen Records sued Pinnacle for copyright infringement over an unauthorized broadcast of the Whitesnake album Slip of the Tongue on KHTY prior to its release. The incident in question occurred on the evening of October 20, when the station's disc jockey encouraged listeners to get ready to record the broadcast, then played the album in its entirety. According to KHTY general manager William H. Johnson Jr., an anonymous source mailed the station an advance copy of the album, and acting program director Darren Stone was unaware of any issues that may arise from playing it early. Geffen sought more than $500,000 in punitive damages. (Slip of the Tongue was released November 7, 1989.)

In August 1993, Pinnacle Communications sold KHTY and KTMS to Atmor Properties to satisfy a debt owed to a finance company principally owned by AT&T. The outstanding amount, including interest and late charges, totaled approximately $4.5 million.

In February 1995, the station dropped the Y97 moniker and adjusted its format to modern rock, identifying simply as "97.5 KHTY". A year later, in January 1996, Engles Enterprises, Inc. purchased KHTY and KTMS for $2 million.

=== KMGQ/KRUZ (1998–2012) ===
KHTY and its modern rock format came to an end in September 1998 when sister station KMGQ moved its call letters and smooth jazz programming from the 106.3 FM frequency to 97.5 FM.

In December 1999, Cumulus Media purchased McDonald Media Group's eight stations, including KMGQ, for $41 million. This transaction marked Cumulus' entry into the Pacific states.

Logo for KRUZ used until November 2012.

In March 2005, Cumulus executed a format shuffle within its Santa Barbara cluster. KMGQ's smooth jazz format and call letters were transferred back to 106.3 FM, while the modern adult contemporary format on KRUZ (103.3 FM) moved to 97.5 FM. As a result, the station at 97.5 FM changed its call letters to KRUZ.

On February 19, 2011 at 5:03 a.m., KRUZ's transmitter went off the air due to heavy rain storms. The station resumed service February 23, 2011 at 6 a.m.

=== Educational Media Foundation era (2012–present) ===
In August 2012, Cumulus sold KRUZ to Educational Media Foundation (EMF) for $1.25 million. Cumulus retained the KRUZ call sign, moving it to an AM station in Van Buren, Arkansas on November 15; the FM station temporarily added an -FM suffix to become KRUZ-FM. EMF took control of the station on December 1, 2012 at midnight, switching to the Christian contemporary hit radio format of its Air1 network with new call letters KYGA.

On December 14, 2017, KYGA flipped to Air1's sister network K-Love, which airs Christian adult contemporary music, and changed its call letters to KLSB. The Air1 feed moved to KLSB's HD2 subchannel.

== HD Radio ==
KLSB broadcasts in HD Radio with three subchannels:

- KLSB-HD1 is a digital simulcast of the analog signal.
- KLSB-HD2 broadcasts Air1, a sister network of K-Love carrying a contemporary worship music format with some contemporary Christian music (CCM) mixed in. Prior to January 1, 2019, Air1 broadcast a broad-based Christian contemporary hit radio (Christian CHR) format.
- KLSB-HD3 airs K-Love Eras, a Christian classic hits network owned by EMF. This programming was added to the HD3 subchannel in early 2025.
