= WKIE =

WKIE may refer to:

- WURB-LP, a low-power radio station (92.7 FM) licensed to serve Kissimmee, Florida, United States, which held the call sign WKIE-LP from 2015 to 2021; see List of radio stations in Florida
- WCPY, a radio station (92.7 FM) licensed to serve Arlington Heights, Illinois, United States, which held the call sign WKIE from 1998 to 2008
