= Nine FM =

Radio network in Illinois, United States

Logo of Nine FM

Nine FM was the branding of several adult hits radio stations in the Chicago area, DeKalb, Illinois, and Kankakee, Illinois owned by media company Newsweb Corp. These stations included;

- WRZA 99.9, Park Forest, Illinois (2004–2008)
- WDEK 92.5, DeKalb, Illinois (2004–2008)
- WKIE 92.7, Arlington Heights, Illinois (2004–2008)
- WKIF 92.7, Kankakee, Illinois (2008–2012)

== History ==
Sky Daniels was the original Program Director and Afternoon Drive host. Daniels hired several Chicago legendary air personalities, including Mitch Michaels, Johhny Mars, and more. Billboard Magazine named NINE-FM 'Top 40 Radio Station Of The Year' in 2004. He left in 2005 and was replaced by Matt DuBiel. Initially Nine FM was not restricted to any content format, but after DuBiel became director, the playlist was tightened because of low ratings and less songs were played.

On May 19, 2006, Nine FM started airing Dance Factory FM on Saturday nights, which expanded to Friday nights after August 12, 2006. On May 10, 2007, it was announced that Dance Factory would be airing weeknights as well. While the weekend shows focused on DJ mixes from Bobby D, DJ Markski, To Kool Chris, Erik K, DJ Caffeine, Danny V, Alex Andros, DJ Jonny D, Zita Zee, Kevin Phoenix, and DJ MIXX; the weeknight shows would play dance hits all night long on Nine FM.
