= WYUR =

Simulcasts WIVR, Kentland, Indiana
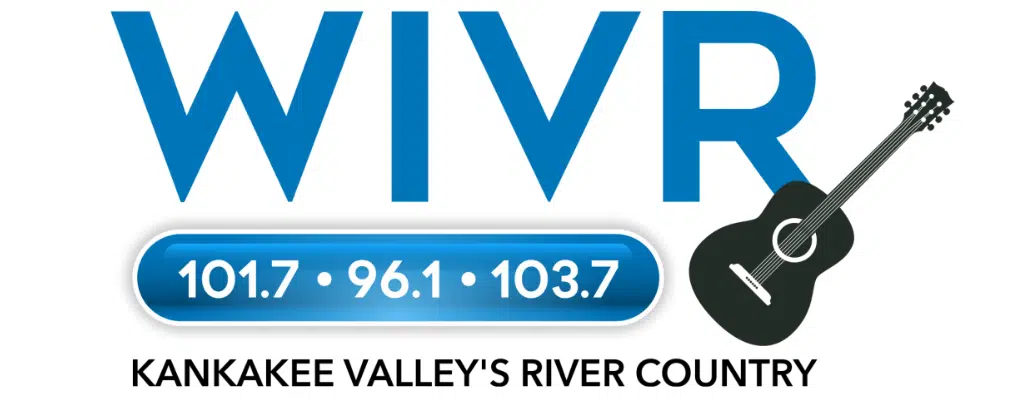
- Gilman, Illinois; United States
- Broadcast area: Iroquois County, Illinois
- Frequency: 103.7 MHz
- Branding: River Country 103.7

Programming
- Format: Country

Ownership
- Owner: Milner Media Partners, LLC
- Sister stations: WFAV; WIVR; WVLI

History
- First air date: 2007 (as WFAV)
- Former call signs: WFAV (2006–2013)

Technical information
- Licensing authority: FCC
- Facility ID: 165987
- Class: A
- ERP: 3,600 watts
- HAAT: 132.1 meters (433 ft)
- Transmitter coordinates: 40.898°N 87.999°W

Links
- Public license information: Public file; LMS
- Webcast: Listen live
- Website: www.wivr1017.com

WYUR (103.7 FM) is a radio station licensed to Gilman, Illinois, and serving Iroquois. Kankakee, and Ford Counties. WYUR has a country music format and is owned by Milner Media Partners, LLC.

== History ==
=== WFAV ===
The station began broadcasting in 2007, holding the call sign WFAV. The station was originally owned by Milner Broadcasting, and its transmitter was located south of Crescent City, Illinois. The station originally had an oldies format, simulcasting the programming of 95.1 WVLI "The Valley" until 2011. The station then adopted a CHR format, as "Your New FAVorite Hit Radio Station". In 2011, the station's transmitter was moved to northwest of Ashkum, Illinois.

=== WYUR ===
Former logo

On February 20, 2013, the station's call sign was changed to WYUR, and its format from CHR to classic rock, branded as "Classic Rock 103.7". Later in 2013, WYUR's format was changed to country, and the station was branded "River Country", simulcasting 101.7 WIVR. In 2018, Milner Broadcasting was sold to the newly formed Milner Media Partners.
