= WLBK =

Radio station in DeKalb, Illinois, United States

- DeKalb, Illinois; United States
- Broadcast area: DeKalb County, Illinois
- Frequency: 1360 kHz
- Branding: FM 98.9 and AM 1360

Programming
- Language: English
- Format: talk; adult contemporary
- Affiliations: ABC News Radio; SportsMap Radio; Northern Illinois Huskies (NCAA)

Ownership
- Owner: DeKalb County Broadcasters, Inc.
- Sister stations: WSQR

History
- First air date: December 5, 1947

Technical information
- Licensing authority: FCC
- Facility ID: 16410
- Class: D
- Power: 1,000 watts (day); 24 watts (night)
- Transmitter coordinates: 41°56′18.1″N 88°45′3.3″W
- Translators: 98.9 W255BN (DeKalb); 99.7 W259CS (DeKalb)

Links
- Public license information: Public file; LMS
- Webcast: Listen live
- Website: wlbkradio.com

WLBK (1360 AM) is an American radio station licensed to serve the community of DeKalb, Illinois. The station, established in 1947, is owned and operated by DeKalb County Broadcasters, Inc.

The station was assigned the call sign "WLBK" by the Federal Communications Commission (FCC).

== Programming ==
WLBK broadcasts a mix of talk radio and adult contemporary music formats to DeKalb County, Illinois, and surrounding communities, and was an affiliate of ABC News Radio as of 2023.

In season, WLBK broadcasts local high school football, the Chicago White Sox (MLB), Chicago Bulls (NBA), and Chicago Bears (NFL). WLBK is the flagship station for Northern Illinois University Huskies football, men's basketball, and women's basketball.

== History ==
=== Early days ===
In 1946, DeKalb Radio Studios, Inc., applied to the FCC for a construction permit for a new broadcast radio station to operate with 500 watts of power on a frequency of 1360 kilohertz. The new station was assigned call sign "WLBK". After construction and testing were completed, the station signed on December 5, 1947.

WLBK was originally co-owned by Roland Wallem and T.A. "Ted" Lanes. Wallem served as the new station's business manager and Lanes was both commercial manager and program director. Charles Green was WLBK's original chief engineer. By 1950, Robert C. Brown was both station manager and program director with Donald Whitman as sales manager and Clayton DeWitt as chief engineer.

=== 1950s ===
In 1951, George Spitz became president of DeKalb Radio Studios, Inc. Robert C. Brown continued as general manager and added both sports director and farm director duties. Zenophon Beake was the chief engineer, Don Ulery the news director, and Lois Montgomery as women's director. In 1952, Ted Beauchamp took over the program director duties with Robert Senne as chief engineer, Don Ulery as sports director, and Lois Montgomery Still, women's director.

In 1953, George C. Biggar took over as president of DeKalb Radio Studios, Inc. Biggar also took the general manager and farm director roles. Richard Meier moved up to commercial manager, Robert C. Brown remained as program director and added promotions manager duties, with Robert Zirk as chief engineer and Herb Carroll as both news director and sports director. This lineup would remain stable through the 1950s with the additions of Russell Pigott of news director and W. Dean Clayton as chief engineer.

=== 1960s ===
Seeking to expand its coverage area and to be able to deliver programming outside its legally mandated daylight-only operation, WLBK applied to the FCC to create an FM sister station to be known as "WLBK-FM". The new station received its broadcast license on December 17, 1961, and simulcast the AM station's programming during the day while originating its own programming at night. As the FM band grew more popular, WLBK-FM began originating more of its own programming. By 1970 only 30% of its content was a WLBK simulcast and by 1976 the total was down to 15%. The FM station was split off with fully independent programming and a new call sign ("WDEK") in 1977, which later became WCPY in 2008 and WCPT-FM in 2014. As of 2018, the station call letters are WCLR.

Concurrent with the launch of the FM station, WLBK received authorization from the FCC to double its own power output from 500 to 1,000 watts. The 1960s saw other changes for the station. In 1963, Richard M. Hubbell became WLBK's commercial manager and Roger L. Belke took over the chief engineer role.

The biggest change came on August 30, 1965, when Jerome F. Cerny acquired DeKalb Radio Studios, Inc. He also took on the titles of president and general manager. Ralph Sherman became the new station manager while Russell Pigott remained as news director and Robert C. Brown kept his job as program director. This lineup of key players remained steady through the rest of the 1960s.

=== 1970s-1980s ===
The station maintained its long-time beautiful music/middle of the road format through the 1970s and 1980s. As a full service station, WLBK also broadcast local news, up to a dozen hours of farm reports each week, plus national news from United Press International. The 1970s also saw Bill Cerny take the reins as station manager while Jerome F. Cerny remained company president and Robert C. Brown shifted to farm director duties.

In 1980, Jerome F. Cerny added chief engineer to his list of duties and resumed his role as the station's general manager. Bill Cerny became both program director and music director while Dick Kliesch was named news director. With Jerome F. Cerny's retirement to Sarasota, Florida, Paul B. Christensen became WLBK's chief engineer in 1981. In 1984, Dianne Leifheit assumed the role of general manager with Jay Burt as news director and Jeff Glass as chief engineer. In April 1985, WCFL Chicago weekend talent Mark Powell was hired as program director and midday host. Powell would take a leave of absence in 1986 and run a protest write in effort in the March 1986 GOP congressional primary. Powell would then return to the station until the following year in 1987 when he was elected 7th Ward Alderman in the City of DeKalb.

=== 1990s-2000s ===
When the 1990s arrived, the station started to update programming. WLBK immediately shifted its programming in 1990 towards a full service all-news radio format mixed in with adult contemporary and oldies music in its lineup. Mark Charvat joined the station as program director with Geoff Gillette as news director and Jim Casey as chief engineer This would persist through the rest of the 1990s, but its music programming started to slowly fade when the 2000s kicked in.

After more than five decades of continuous ownership, DeKalb Radio Studios, Inc., agreed to sell WLBK to Big City Radio-Chi, LLC, in April 1998. The FCC approved the sale on June 18, 1998, and the transaction was formally consummated on February 25, 1999. This would prove short-lived as in December 1999 Big City Radio-Chi, LLC, (Charles M. Fernandez, president and CEO) applied to transfer WLBK and its broadcast license to WPW Broadcasting, Inc., (David T. Madison, president and CEO). The deal gained FCC approval on February 8, 2000, and formal consummation occurred on April 12, 2000.

=== 2010s ===
In September 2010, WPW Broadcasting, Inc., (Don Davis, president) contracted to sell WLBK to DeKalb County Broadcasters, Inc., (Larry Nelson, president) for $575,000. The deal was approved by the FCC on November 10, 2010, and the transaction was formally consummated on December 24, 2010.

Weekday broadcasts as of January 5, 2012 included local news, weather forecasts, and community information, agribusiness updates, business news from CNBC, and hourly news reports from CNN Radio (later replaced by ABC News Radio the following year). WLBK also aired a tradio program titled Trading Post. Weekday syndicated shows include Dr. Joy Browne, The Dave Ramsey Show, and Yahoo! Sports Radio. Weekend programming as of January 5, 2012, included repeats of Dr. Joy Browne, Animal Planet, SportsMap Radio, religious services, plus talk shows about politics, antiques, home improvement, and suicide prevention.

Currently the station airs an adult contemporary music format from program supplier Dial Global.

In February 2025, WLBK cancelled the morning show and let many of its on-air personalities go. The station still broadcasts for DeKalb County; however the station has moved to the owner's main facilities in Plano.
