= KAMB (FM) =

Christian radio station in Merced, California

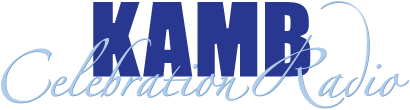
- Merced, California; United States
- Broadcast area: Modesto - Turlock; Central California
- Frequency: 101.5 MHz
- Branding: Celebration Radio

Programming
- Format: Contemporary Christian

Ownership
- Owner: Central Valley Broadcasting Company, Inc.

History
- First air date: November 4, 1967

Technical information
- Licensing authority: FCC
- Facility ID: 34427
- Class: B
- ERP: 1,850 watts
- HAAT: 638 meters (2,093 ft)
- Transmitter coordinates: 37°32′01″N 120°01′46″W
- Repeater: 88.9 KLVM-HD4 (Santa Cruz)

Links
- Public license information: Public file; LMS
- Webcast: Listen live
- Website: celebrationradio.com

KAMB (101.5 FM, Celebration Radio) is a non-commercial radio station licensed to Merced, California, United States, serving the Modesto-Turlock-Merced area of the Central Valley in Central California. Owned by Central Valley Broadcasting Company, Inc. KAMB features a Contemporary Christian format and has been a Christian radio station since its founding on November 4, 1967.

Studios are on East 16th Street in Merced, while the transmitter is on a mountaintop in Mount Bullion, California, about 20 miles (32 km) northeast of Merced. In addition, KAMB is relayed on several FM translators in Central and Northern California.

== Programming ==
Most of the day, KAMB plays Contemporary Christian music with Christian talk and teaching shows in early morning and evenings.

== Translators ==
In addition to the main station, KAMB is relayed by broadcast translators across the Northern California area.

Call sign	Frequency	City of license	FID	ERP (W)	Class	FCC info
K242AT	96.3 FM	Salinas, California	10925	250	D	LMS
K265CY	100.9 FM	San Jose, California	15875	7	D	LMS
K276BR	103.1 FM	Santa Cruz, California	10939	10	D	LMS
K296FO	107.1 FM	Sonora, California	157958	200	D	LMS
