= Pro Football Weekly =

American sports magazine

- Categories: Sports magazine
- Frequency: 30 times a year
- Founded: 1967
- Country: US
- Based in: Riverwoods, Illinois
- Language: English
- Website: www.profootballweekly.com
- ISSN: 0032-9053

Pro Football Weekly (sometimes shortened to PFW) is an American sports magazine, founded in 1967, and website that covers the National Football League (NFL). It was owned by Pro Football Weekly LLC and headquartered in Riverwoods, Illinois. PFW closed temporarily in 2013, but it reopened in partnership with Shaw Media in 2014.

The magazine was published 32 times a year, including every week of the NFL season, and issued four supplementary publications – the Pro Football Weekly Preview, the Fantasy Football Guide, the Draft Preview, and the Pro Prospects Preview – annually. With a beat writer covering each NFL team, the magazine was one of a small number covering each team in detail on a regular basis. Three of the four supplementary publications, the Pro Football Weekly Preview, Fantasy Football Guide and Draft Preview, continue to be published annually by Shaw Media.

Hub Arkush remains PFW's editor.

While the weekly magazine has ceased publication, the popular syndicated radio show called Pro Football Weekly & Basketball News also has continued. It is hosted by Arkush and Wayne Larrivee; the program also covers the NBA. Similarly, the Pro Football Weekly half-hour television show continues to air. Also in partnership with Shaw Media, Arkush launched ChicagoFootball.com in 2014, and ProFootballWeekly.com was relaunched in 2015.

From 1996 to 2002, Pro Football Weekly was owned by Primedia.

== NFL awards ==
- Pro Football Weekly NFL Coach of the Year
- Pro Football Weekly/Pro Football Writers of America NFL Rookie of the Year
- Golden Toe Award, presented annually to the top kicker in the NFL
