= Cara Carriveau =

American radio personality

- Born: Cara Stern; Detroit, Michigan, U.S.
- Other names: Cara Stern, Cara Simms, Cara Busch
- Presenting career
- Show: Radio Personality
- Stations: WLS-FM in Chicago & Nationwide via Local Radio Networks
- Time slot: LRN: 10 a.m. - 3 p.m. Eastern Time
- Show: Podcast Host
- Station: Caras Basement
- Country: United States
- Website: www.carasbasement.com

Cara Carriveau has spent three decades hosting radio shows in Chicago, currently on WLS-FM.

== History ==
She was born in Detroit, Michigan, and grew up in West Bloomfield, Michigan.

Her first professional radio job using her maiden name Cara Stern was at 95.3 "The New Foxy 95" WCFX in Clare, Michigan while attending college at Central Michigan University. She was hired as a weekend overnight/fill-in personality at WCFX in 1986 and was soon promoted to weekend middays (10 am – 3 pm), then full-time evenings (7 pm – midnight) and eventually middays (10 am – 2 pm) and Production Director.

In 1989, using the stage name Cara Simms on air, she began hosting overnights at 103.9 WABT "The Wabbit" in Dundee, Illinois. Within a year she moved up to evenings (7 pm – 12 am), and within another year began hosting middays (10 am – 3 pm) and also became Assistant Program Director. She was appointed Program Director in 1992 and shortened her on-air shift to 10 am - noon to accommodate her new responsibility. She remained at WABT until the station was put up for sale in 1995. Using her newly acquired married name Cara Carriveau, she became Program Director at Shadow Broadcast Services in Chicago, Illinois in 1995.

One responsibility of her position was anchoring the news and being a sidekick on the nationally syndicated Kevin Matthews Morning Show originating from WLUP studio's in the John Hancock Building. Later that same year Carriveau began hosting weekends at 95.1 WIIL "95 Will Rock" in Kenosha, Wisconsin. Within a few months (March 1996) she accepted the simultaneous positions at WIIL of morning show sidekick/news anchor, midday host (via voicetracking) and Promotion Director. At the same time, she also began hosting weekends at "Rock 103.5" WRCX in Chicago, Illinois. It was during this time that Carriveau discovered she was pregnant with her first child.

After her daughter was born in 1996 Carriveau left WIIL and chose to continue working only part-time at WRCX, allowing her to dedicate more time to being a mother. When WRCX changed formats in 1998 and terminated the entire on air staff, she briefly filled in at WTMX hosting evenings and then middays for vacationing radio personalities during the holidays, then began working part-time at 97.9 WLUP "The Loop" in January, 1999. Within two months she was promoted to full-time evenings (7 pm – midnight), and in 2000 was promoted to middays (9 am – 2 pm). She remained at WLUP until 2006, when she was let go after writing a letter to Chicago Sun-Times columnist Robert Feder lamenting about legendary radio personalities currently off the air.

During her brief time off the air during which spent a great deal of time caring for her toddler son, Carriveau decided to pursue her passion of interviewing entertainers, specifically rock stars. She started her podcast Cara's Basement in February, 2007, which she still continues to host.

During this time Carriveau also began providing artist interviews for The Chicago Music Guide and providing blog content for The NBC5 Street Team. She returned to the Chicago radio airwaves, working weekends and often filling in weekdays at WTMX beginning in November, 2006. Carriveau was chosen to host middays full-time in July, 2008 after a nationwide search. In 2010 and 2012 she was named "Best Radio Personality, Major Market" by the Illinois Broadcasters Association, winning first place Silver Dome awards. After spending five years hosting middays at 101.9 The MIX, she moved to sister station Chicago's 100.3 WILV on January 14, 2013, hosting evenings. She was promoted to afternoon drive in July, 2014 and continues in that capacity after WILV changed call letters to WSHE in March 2015. She also began blogging for The Local Tourist and was appointed "Music X-Pert" in 2013.

On March 2, 2018, Cara parted ways with WSHE. Cara began hosting middays nationwide on Local Radio Network's classic rock format on April 9, 2018 and joined the air staff at Chicago's 94.7 WLS-FM in July, 2019. She currently continues both radio jobs, in addition to filling in when needed at Chicago's Q101 WKQX.
