= KAZU =

- Pacific Grove, California; United States
- Frequency: 90.3 MHz (HD Radio)

Programming
- Format: Public radio - News, Talk and Information
- Subchannels: HD2: Classical "Classical 24"

Ownership
- Owner: California State University, Monterey Bay; (Foundation of California State University, Monterey Bay)

History
- First air date: August 1977; 48 years ago

Technical information
- Licensing authority: FCC
- Facility ID: 43591
- Class: B1
- ERP: 3,100 watts
- HAAT: 189 meters (620 ft)
- Transmitter coordinates: 36°33′8.7″N 121°47′21″W
- Translator: 89.5 K208GJ (Santa Cruz)

Links
- Public license information: Public file; LMS
- Webcast: Listen Live
- Website: kazu.org

KAZU (90.3 MHz) is a non-commercial FM radio station licensed to Pacific Grove, California, and serving the Monterey Bay area of the California Coast. It is a listener-supported public radio station with a news, talk and information format and is owned and operated by California State University, Monterey Bay (CSUMB). It is a network affiliate of National Public Radio (NPR) with radio studios and offices in the north side of Gavilan Hall on the campus of CSUMB on Sixth Avenue in Seaside.

KAZU has an effective radiated power (ERP) of 3,100 watts. The transmitter is on Saddle Road in Monterey. Programming is also heard on FM translators K208GJ 89.5 MHz in Santa Cruz and K217EK 91.3 MHz in Palo Colorado Canyon.

== History ==
=== Established ===
KAZU began broadcasting in August 1977 from an upstairs office in downtown Pacific Grove. The station was started as a local community radio station, with a focus on the south Monterey Bay cities. The station operated with 10 watts, and had about 90 volunteers who ran the on-air operation; a small board of directors oversaw the fiscal and legal operations of the corporation that owned KAZU was called The Great Silence Broadcasting Foundation.

=== Wider broadcast ===
Because of the low power, the reach was limited, so the station signal was added to the Monterey cable system in 1978. The transmitter was relocated to Hidden Hills, east of Monterey in 1980, and coverage was expanded to reach the entire Monterey Bay area. Programming and volunteer participation expanded as well, and the station migrated to larger studios in the same building in the mid-1980s.

=== Fire and relocation ===
A fire at the studio in the late 1990s briefly put KAZU off the air. Temporary studios were quickly built and the station moved out of downtown Pacific Grove to Lighthouse Avenue in Pacific Grove. After a series of managers and program directors, the station struggled to survive high rents for the new studios and the old transmitter site. The locally produced music and talk programming remained popular with the community, but financial support did not grow sufficiently to cover the new expenses.

=== Financial collapse ===
In the late 1990s, the fiscal situation worsened, and cuts to staff were made. A new manager was hired in 1998, and plans were made to change the station to an NPR/PRI affiliate and reduce volunteer programming.

The station was still unable to continue financially, so the board planned to give the station to an outside third-party non-profit. Both KUSP in Santa Cruz, and Cal State University Monterey Bay (CSUMB) offered to take over KAZU operations. The board chose CSUMB. Further programming changes were made and by 2002, all volunteers were removed from programming. In 2008, KAZU relocated from offices on Central Avenue in Pacific Grove to Gavilan Hall on the campus of CSUMB.

On April 5, 2017, CSUMB filed applications with the Federal Communications Commission to purchase the licenses of three FM translators: K207CN (Santa Cruz), K217EK (Palo Colorado Canyon) and K237EV (Big Sur Valley) owned by KUSP. The purchase price was $5,000. The applications were consummated on June 30, 2017 and July 7, 2017.
