= KDTI =

- Rochester Hills, Michigan; United States
- Frequency: 90.3 MHz
- Branding: "Smile FM"

Programming
- Format: Christian contemporary music

Ownership
- Owner: Full Potential Ministry

History
- First air date: 2006
- Former call signs: KSHW (2006–2007); KVLZ (2007–2014)
- Former frequencies: 89.9 MHz (2009–2015)

Technical information
- Licensing authority: FCC
- Facility ID: 91354
- Class: A
- ERP: 37 watts
- HAAT: 53 meters (174 ft)
- Transmitter coordinates: 42°40′43″N 83°07′28″W

Links
- Public license information: Public file; LMS
- Website: https://smile.fm

KDTI (90.3 FM) is a radio station broadcasting a Christian contemporary music format. Licensed to Rochester Hills, Michigan, United States, the station is currently owned by Full Potential Ministry, and is a rebroadcaster of the Smile FM network.

Formerly licensed to Sheridan, Wyoming, on March 10, 2015, the station moved to Rochester Hills, Michigan (a suburb of Detroit) and signed on at 90.3 MHz with an effective radiated power of 37 watts. At this time (under the ownership of the Educational Media Foundation), the station also switched to K-Love's sister network, Air1. It is the second licensed radio station in the state of Michigan with a call sign beginning with the letter K, with the first being KTGG in Spring Arbor.

In October 2018, the station flipped to the EMF's K-Love Classics network. In November 2020, the station flipped to "K-Love Christmas" for the holiday season after the national discontinuation of K-Love Classics, emerging under the new "K-Love 2000s" format in January 2021.

On April 17, 2026, EMF filed a Notice of Consummation for KDTI. The purchaser was Full Potential Ministry of Imlay City, and paid $75,000 for the station. By April 20, the ownership status was updated to reflect the sale. Up until May 9th, the station had stunted with the inclusion of some instrumental soundtracks and Christian-oriented country songs within the Christian contemporary format, even very briefly rebranding as "The Hills" but as of May 9th the station is now in full simulcast of the Smile FM network, and identifying itself as such in its sweepers.
