= WVLI =

Classic Hits radio station in Kankakee, Illinois

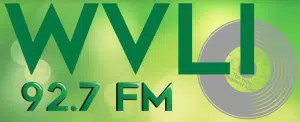
- Kankakee, Illinois; United States
- Broadcast area: Southern Chicago market
- Frequency: 92.7 MHz
- Branding: The Valley

Programming
- Format: Classic hits

Ownership
- Owner: Milner Media Partners, LLC
- Sister stations: WFAV; WYUR; WIVR

History
- First air date: September 21, 1986
- Former call signs: WLRT (1986–1998); WBRO (1998); WKIF (1998–2012)
- Call sign meaning: Sounds like "valley"

Technical information
- Licensing authority: FCC
- Facility ID: 62360
- Class: A
- ERP: 3,000 watts
- HAAT: 100 meters (330 ft)
- Transmitter coordinates: 41°7′22.1″N 87°53′35.1″W

Links
- Public license information: Public file; LMS
- Webcast: Listen live
- Website: www.wvli927.com

WVLI (92.7 FM) "The Greatest Hits of All-Time" is a radio station broadcasting a classic hits format. The station is licensed to Kankakee, Illinois, United States. During its days as WKIF, it also broadcast Chicago White Sox, Chicago Bulls, Notre Dame football and other sporting events. WVLI is owned by Milner Media Partners, LLC.

== History ==
=== WLRT ===
The station began broadcasting September 21, 1986, holding the call sign WLRT. The station aired a lite rock format. In 1993, the station adopted a country music format and was branded "T93".

In 1998, the station was sold to Big City Radio, which also purchased WCBR-FM in Arlington Heights (also on 92.7) at the same time. When Big City Radio took control of the two stations, they stunted with a simulcast of their Los Angeles sister station 107.1 KLYY, which aired a modern rock format. The station's call sign was changed to WBRO shortly thereafter.

=== 92 Kiss FM ===
92 Kiss FM logo

On November 14, 1998, at Noon, WBRO and WCBR launched their new format, CHR as "92.7 Kiss FM", with the first song being "Kiss" by Prince. In late December 1998, the station's call sign was changed to WKIF, while WCBR's call sign was changed to WKIE.

Big City Radio also purchased WDEK 92.5 in DeKalb, Illinois, which was airing a locally programmed CHR format at the time, and switched it to a simulcast of WKIF and WKIE in early 1999. Not long after, the moniker was adjusted to "92 Kiss FM". Melissa Forman hosted mornings on 92 Kiss FM, before moving to 93.9 WLIT-FM in 2001.

=== Energy 92.7&5 ===
On January 12, 2001, Clear Channel's WUBT changed formats from rhythmic oldies to CHR as WKSC-FM "Kiss 103.5". At that time, Clear Channel filed suit against Big City Radio, alleging the "Kiss FM" branding used by WKIF and its simulcasts violated its national trademark. However, Big City Radio had already planned on changing the formats of these stations. On January 26, 2001, 92 Kiss-FM signed off, and the three stations adopted a dance hits format as "Energy 92.7&5". The station's airstaff remained intact. The new format was designed by 92 Kiss FM's program director, Chris Shebel, who has stated that the dance hits format is something he had dreamed of doing for a long time.

=== Onda 92 ===
In late 2002, Big City Radio, became insolvent and began the process of selling all of its radio stations. In early 2003, WKIF, WKIE, and WDEK were sold to Spanish Broadcasting System for $22 million. On January 6, 2003, the three stations adopted a Spanish contemporary format as "Onda 92".

=== Newsweb ownership ===
In 2004, Spanish Broadcasting System sold WKIF, WKIE, and WDEK to Newsweb Corporation for $28 million. WKIF was broken off the simulcast and became a full time affiliate of CNN Headline News, while WKIE and WDEK began simulcasting its new adult hits sister station 99.9 WRZA in Park Forest, Illinois, as "Nine FM", with the slogan "We Play Anything". In October 2008, the Nine FM simulcast on WKIE, WDEK, and WRZA was replaced with progressive talk, but on December 19, 2008, Nine FM was brought back on WKIF.

=== The Valley ===
In 2012, the station was sold to Milner Broadcasting for $1 million. In August 2012, WKIF changed their format to oldies, simulcasting WVLI 95.1 FM Kankakee, branded as "The Valley". On December 27, 2012, WVLI 95.1 (now WFAV) dropped the simulcast of 92.7 and made its anticipated switch to CHR simulcasting WFAV 103.7 in Gilman, Illinois. On December 29, 2012, WKIF and WVLI swapped call letters, putting WKIF on 95.1 and WVLI on 92.7. In 2018, Milner Broadcasting was sold to the newly formed Milner Media Partners. In late 2023, Tammy Sowder replaced Tim Milner as president and general manager of WVLI.
