= KJQS =

- Van Buren, Arkansas; United States
- Broadcast area: Fort Smith and Vicinity
- Frequency: 1060 kHz

Ownership
- Owner: Cumulus Media; (Cumulus Licensing LLC)

History
- Former call signs: KAYR (?-1987); KLSZ (1987–1988); KAYR (1988–2006); KOAI (2006–2012); KRUZ (2012–2015)

Technical information
- Facility ID: 37828
- Class: D
- Power: 500 wat]s (days only)
- Transmitter coordinates: 35°25′36″N 94°18′11″W

KJQS (1060 AM) was a radio station licensed to Van Buren, Arkansas, United States, serving the Ft. Smith, Arkansas, area. The station was owned by Cumulus Media.

For a time from 2006 to 2012, it broadcast a Regional Mexican format as La Maquina Musical 1060 (translates to The Musical Machine, possibly referring to a juke box). The station had been silent since March 23, 2012.

On November 30, 2015, KRUZ changed its call sign to KJQS. On December 8, 2015, Cumulus Media surrendered KJQS' license to the Federal Communications Commission (FCC); the FCC cancelled the license and deleted the KJQS call sign the same day.
