= WIVR =

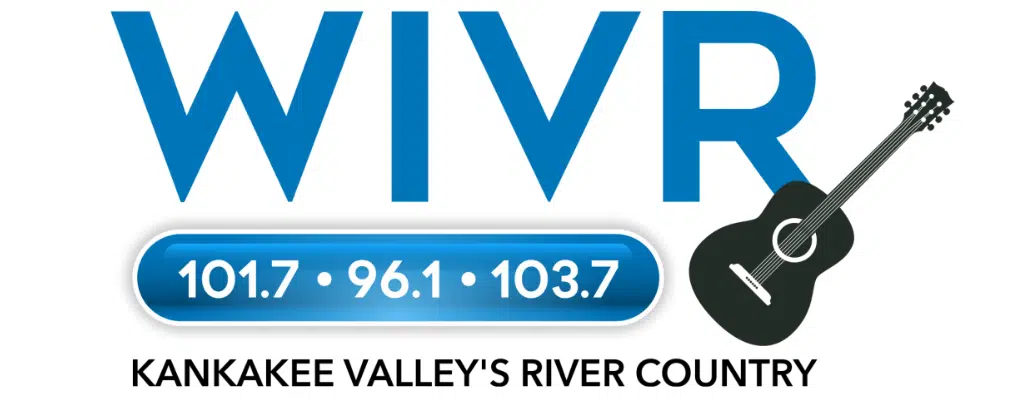
- Kentland, Indiana; United States
- Frequency: 101.7 MHz
- Branding: River Country

Programming
- Format: Country music

Ownership
- Owner: Milner Media Partners, LLC
- Sister stations: WYUR; WFAV; WVLI

History
- First air date: 2000

Technical information
- Licensing authority: FCC
- Facility ID: 82091
- Class: A
- ERP: 3,200 watts
- HAAT: 138 meters (453 ft)
- Transmitter coordinates: 40.864°N 87.587°W
- Repeaters: 103.7 WYUR (Gilman, Illinois); 95.1 WFAV-HD2 (Kankakee, Illinois)

Links
- Public license information: Public file; LMS
- Webcast: Listen live
- Website: www.wivr1017.com

WIVR (101.7 FM) "River Country" is a radio station licensed to Kentland, Indiana, and serving Newton County, Benton County, and Jasper County in Indiana, and Iroquois County, and Kankakee County in Illinois. WIVR has a country music format and is owned by Milner Media Partners, LLC.
