= WCPT (AM) =

Progressive talk radio station in Willow Springs–Chicago, Illinois

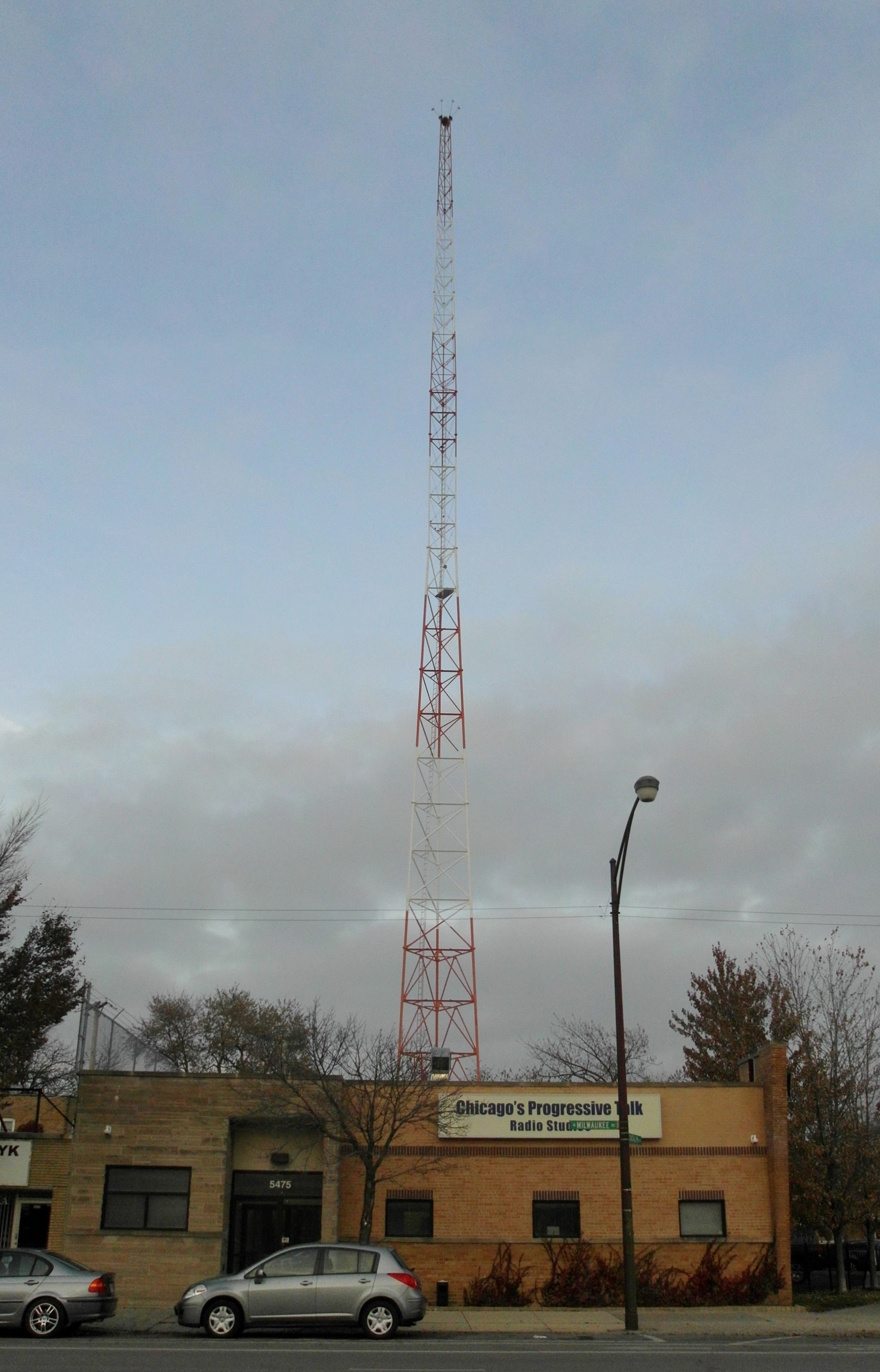
- WCPT's studio building and daytime tower
- Willow Springs, Illinois; United States
- Broadcast area: Chicago metropolitan area
- Frequency: 820 kHz
- Branding: WCPT 820

Programming
- Format: Progressive talk radio
- Affiliations: AP News; NBC News Radio; Pacifica Radio; Westwood One

Ownership
- Owner: Heartland Signal LLC
- Sister stations: WSBC

History
- First air date: June 23, 1923
- Former call signs: WCBD (1923–1941); WAIT (1941–1986); WCZE (1986–1988); WXEZ (1988–1990); WPNT (1990–1992); WSCR (1992–1997); WYPA (1997–2001); WCSN (2001–2005); WAIT (2005–2007)
- Former frequencies: 870 kHz (1923–1928); 1080 kHz (1928–1941); 1110 kHz (1941)
- Call sign meaning: "We're Chicago's Progressive Talk"

Technical information
- Licensing authority: FCC
- Facility ID: 16849
- Class: B
- Power: 5,800 watts (day); 2,500 watts (auxiliary day); 1,500 watts (night)
- Transmitter coordinates: 41°58′53.11″N 87°46′20.22″W (day); 41°32′30.11″N 88°2′3.21″W; (night/aux)
- Repeaters: 1510 KFNN (Mesa, Arizona); 1690 WMLB (Avondale Estates, Georgia)

Links
- Public license information: Public file; LMS
- Webcast: Listen live
- Website: Official website

WCPT (820 AM) is a commercial progressive talk radio station licensed to serve Willow Springs, Illinois, owned by Heartland Signal LLC. The station's studios and daytime transmitter are located in the Jefferson Park neighborhood on Chicago's Northwest Side, while its nighttime transmitter is located in Joliet.

== History ==
=== WCBD ===
On June 23, 1923, the station signed on using the call sign WCBD, broadcasting at 870 kHz. The station was located in Zion, Illinois, and was owned by Wilbur Glenn Voliva, who was the "General Overseer" of the Christian Catholic Apostolic Church, and was known for his flat Earth beliefs. WCBD was non-commercial, airing religious programming that reflected Voliva's viewpoints, along with vocal and instrumental music. The station originally ran at 500 watts. On February 2, 1925, its power was increased to 5,000 watts. From April 1924 until November 11, 1928, WCBD shared time on its frequency with WLS. In November 1928, its frequency was changed to 1080 kHz, where it shared time with WMBI. Both WCBD and WMBI were restricted to daytime operations to protect WBT in Charlotte, North Carolina.

In 1934, WCBD's studios were moved to the Karcher Hotel in Waukegan, Illinois, and Gene T. Dyer was appointed station director. The station began to air some Italian language programming. In 1936, the station was sold to Gene T. Dyer and its studios were moved to the Guyon Paradise Ballroom in Chicago. It became a commercial operation, and aired religious, ethnic, and music programming. On April 2, 1937, the station's transmitter and the Christian Catholic Apostolic Church's Shiloh Tabernacle were destroyed in a fire set by a teenager who believed Voliva had swindled his father. Its transmitter site was relocated to Addison Township, in what today is part of Elmhurst, Illinois, and its studios were moved to 2400 W. Madison in Chicago. WCBD shared WMBI's transmitter while its new transmitter was being built.

In 1940, Voliva filed suit against WCBD, alleging that the station's insistence that he provide scripts of speeches violated the terms of his contract, which allowed him to speak on the station without censorship. Dyer stated that the requirement was necessary because Voliva had violated his promise not to air his political views. WCBD's frequency was changed to 1110 kHz in March 1941, as a result of the North American Regional Broadcasting Agreement.

=== WAIT ===
In June 1941, the station's frequency was changed to 820 kHz. It ran 5,000 watts, signing off at sunset in Dallas to protect WBAP in Fort Worth. The call sign was changed to WAIT on September 15, 1941. In 1947, the station began sharing time with a new WCBD, owned by the Christian Catholic Church in Zion, Illinois, which operated on Sundays only. In 1959, WAIT's owners purchased WCBD for $132,000, and WAIT was granted full daytime operations on the frequency. Daddy-O Daylie began his radio career on WAIT in 1948, hosting a jazz program. Daylie remained on the station until 1956, when he began hosting a nighttime show on 670 WMAQ.

In 1951, the station's studios were moved to its transmitter site in Elmhurst. In 1954, it was sold to Robert Oscar Miller and family. Nelson Eddy, the Wayne King Orchestra, Liberace, Coke Time with Eddie Fisher, and The Hour of Charm were heard on WAIT in the 1950s. In the mid-1950s, WAIT published a chart of the top 20 popular songs in Chicago. Reed Farrell and Lloyd 'Spider' Webb were DJs on the station during this period. In 1957, the station's studios were moved to the Steuben Club Building. In 1963, its studios were moved back to its transmitter site in Elmhurst, though its offices remained in the Steuben Club Building.

In 1962, the station was sold to a partnership led by Maurice and Lois Rosenfield, for $1 million. It adopted a beautiful music format in early 1963, which it continued to air through the 1970s. It was branded "The World's Most Beautiful Music" and used the slogan "try a little tenderness". Personalities heard on WAIT during this era included Ken Alexander, Dick Buckley, and John Doremus. In 1967, the station applied to the Federal Communications Commission for a waiver of its clear-channel rules so that it could operate at night. When the FCC denied its application, it appealed to the D.C. Court of Appeals, which upheld the FCC's decision.

In autumn 1976, the station shifted to an adult contemporary format. In October 1977, WAIT switched to a talk format. However, its ratings dropped considerably after it abandoned the beautiful music format, and in August 1978 it returned to the beautiful music format it had long aired. In 1979, the station's license was assigned to Century Chicago Broadcasting, a partnership of Century Broadcasting Corporation and the station's previous owners. In 1980, it applied to the FCC for a construction permit to add nighttime operations at 1,000 watts. The permit was granted in 1981, and it began nighttime operations by 1982. In 1981, the station started carrying Northwestern Wildcats football games.

In October 1982, WAIT began airing an adult standards format branded "Great Hits", featuring the hits of the 1940s, 1950s, and 1960s. The station aired Chuck Schaden's Radio Theatre weekday evenings. Eddie Hubbard joined WAIT in 1983, and hosted the morning drive show. Dick Buckley hosted a jazz program Saturday nights from 1984 to 1985.

=== Soft AC era ===
On April 7, 1986, the station began airing a soft adult contemporary format as "Cozy" WCZE. Gary Parks hosted morning drive, while the rest of its programming was delivered by satellite from Transtar Radio Networks' "Format 41" service. In April 1988, its call sign was changed to WXEZ, standing for "Extra Easy", and it became a simulcast of WXEZ-FM, airing easy listening music. In 1989, it shifted back to a soft AC format, playing more vocals and fewer instrumentals. On November 16, 1990, the station's call sign was changed to WPNT, and it briefly aired a hot AC format branded "The Point," simulcasting WPNT-FM. In early January 1991, the station was taken off the air, as its owner disposed of its transmitter site in Elmhurst, Illinois.

=== The Score ===
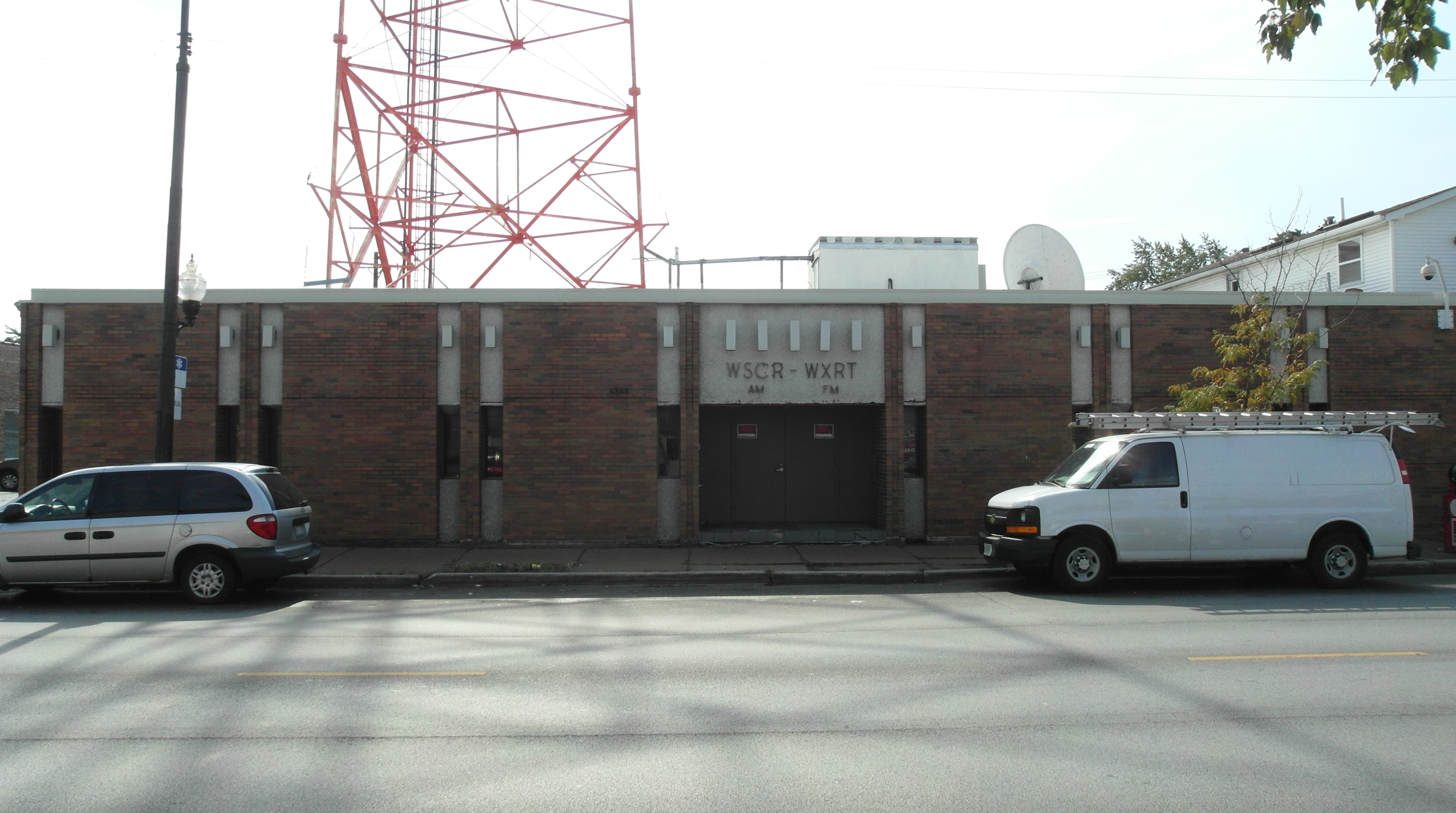
Former studio and transmitter site in Chicago's Cragin neighborhood

In late 1991, the station was sold to Diamond Broadcasting. At 7:15 am on January 2, 1992, it returned to the air from a new site in Chicago's Cragin neighborhood, though without nighttime operations. It became WSCR "The Score," the first all-sports station in Chicago. The Score's original hosts included Tom Shaer, Dan Jiggetts partnered with Mike North, and Dan McNeil. McNeil would later be partnered with Terry Boers. Former Chicago Bears coach Mike Ditka hosted a weekly show in 1992, and served as an analyst during football season until 1997, when he was hired to coach the New Orleans Saints. WSCR carried Illinois Fighting Illini basketball in the 1993–1994 season, but their status as a daytimer limited the number of games they could air. Night games instead aired on 92.7 WCBR-FM.

On November 10, 1994, WSCR was granted a construction permit to broadcast at night, running 1,200 watts from a site in Lemont, Illinois. In 1995, the station was sold to Westinghouse (Group W), along with WXRT, for $60 million. Westinghouse decided against building the nighttime transmitter site in Lemont, and instead made plans to move "The Score" to 1160 AM. The construction permit to add nighttime operations was cancelled. On April 7, 1997, at 2:30 pm, "The Score" moved to 1160 AM, along with the WSCR call letters.

=== WYPA ===
In early 1997, the station was sold to N. John Douglas's Personal Achievement Radio, Inc. for $7.5 million. On April 7, 1997, it began airing a motivational talk format as "Personal Achievement Radio", and its call sign was changed to WYPA. Its programming was presented in short segments, less than ten minutes long, and included material culled from the libraries of self-help publishers featuring speakers such as Tony Robbins, as well as locally produced segments featuring Wayne Messmer and Mary Laney. Weekends featured longer shows, with local hosts such as Les Brown, as well as brokered programming.

On June 9, 1998, "Personal Achievement Radio" moved to WNDZ, and WYPA adopted a Spanish language talk format as an affiliate of "Radio Unica." Personalities heard on Radio Unica included Pedro Sevcec, Isabel Gómez-Bassols, among others. In 1998, the station's owner, Achievement Radio Holdings, merged with Z-Spanish Media. On May 15, 1999, Radio Unica moved to 950 WNTD, though it continued to simulcast on WYPA.

In mid-1999, the station was purchased by Catholic Family Radio for $10.5 million, and on June 9 it began airing a Catholic talk format. Hosts included Ray Guarendi, Raymond Flynn, Dan Lungren, and Al Kresta. In April 2000, Catholic Family Radio placed all of its radio stations up for sale, and on May 29, most of Catholic Family Radio's programming was replaced by EWTN Radio, with Al Kresta's show being the only Catholic Family Radio show remaining on the station.

=== Newsweb ownership ===
In early 2001, WYPA was purchased by Newsweb Corporation for $10.5 million. On March 1, 2001, One on One Sports moved its programming from WJKL to WYPA, and the station adopted a sports format. On March 26, 2001, One-on-One Sports' name was changed to Sporting News Radio, and the station's call sign was changed to WCSN. Personalities heard on the station included Jay Mariotti, Chet Coppock, Phil Jackson, and Bruce Murray.

In April 2003, Starboard Broadcasting began leasing two hours of airtime a day to air the Relevant Radio Catholic network. On December 1, 2003, it began leasing the entire day. On May 3, 2005, the station's call letters were changed back to WAIT when Newsweb's WAIT (850 AM) launched a progressive talk format with the new call letters WCPT. Newsweb's owner, Fred Eychaner, is a significant donor to Democratic Party causes. Later that year, the station's city of license was changed from Chicago to Willow Springs. In October 2007, Relevant Radio moved to WNTD, though it continued to simulcast on WAIT until November 25.

==== Chicago's Progressive Talk ====
On November 26, 2007, Chicago's Progressive Talk moved from 850 AM to 820 AM, doubling its power and providing coverage to all of the Chicago metropolitan area. The WCPT call letters moved along with the format to 820 AM, and the WAIT call letters returned to 850 AM. Hosts included Ed Schultz, Stephanie Miller, Randi Rhodes, Thom Hartmann, Bill Press, and Robert F. Kennedy Jr. On March 29, 2008, Jake Hartford joined WCPT, hosting Saturday mornings. On May 19, 2008, WCPT began airing The Rachel Maddow Show, and in January 2010 the station began airing The Norman Goldman Show.

In late October 2008, the station started simulcasting on 92.7 WCPT-FM in Arlington Heights, 92.5 WCPY in DeKalb, and 99.9 WCPQ in Park Forest. On March 19, 2009, WCPT and WIND hosted "The Great Debate", featuring Thom Hartmann representing the liberal viewpoint and Michael Medved representing the conservative viewpoint, and moderated by Cisco Cotto and Dick Kay. On April 29, 2010, WCPT began broadcasting 24 hours a day, although it reduces power to 1,500 watts after sunset so not to interfere with WBAP in Fort Worth. On June 2, 2014, WCPT-FM and WCPQ broke away from the simulcast, and 92.5 in DeKalb took the WCPT-FM call sign. In 2016, WCPT's daytime power was increased to 5,800 watts, and its daytime transmitter was moved to Chicago's Jefferson Park neighborhood. In 2018, WCPT-FM was sold to Educational Media Foundation and became an affiliate of K-Love, a Christian contemporary music network.

Joan Esposito joined WCPT as weekday afternoon host on February 11, 2019. In late February 2019, the station began carrying The Rick Ungar Show. Santita Jackson joined WCPT as morning drive host on June 3, 2019. On November 18, 2021, the station launched an associated digital newsroom, Heartland Signal.

In 2024, Newsweb transferred WCPT and WSBC to Heartland Signal for $1.
