= WYHI =

Bible Broadcasting Network radio station in Park Forest, Illinois

Coordinates: 41.301109°N 87.826395°W

- Park Forest, Illinois; United States
- Broadcast area: Chicago Southland; Northwest Indiana; Kankakee County, Illinois; Iroquois County, Illinois
- Frequency: 99.9 MHz
- Branding: Bible Broadcasting Network

Programming
- Format: Christian talk and teaching
- Network: Salem Radio Network

Ownership
- Owner: Bible Broadcasting Network, Inc.

History
- First air date: January 5, 1962
- Former call signs: WKAK (1962–1975); WBYG (1975–1985); WBSW (1985–1987); WBUS (1987–1996); WRZA (1996–2008); WCPQ (2008–2018)
- Call sign meaning: "Where You Hear Inspiration"

Technical information
- Licensing authority: FCC
- Facility ID: 23476
- Class: B
- ERP: 50,000 watts
- HAAT: 150 meters (490 ft)

Links
- Public license information: Public file; LMS
- Webcast: Listen live
- Website: Official website

WYHI (99.9 MHz) is a non-commercial FM radio station licensed to Park Forest, Illinois, serving the Southland suburbs of Chicago. It is owned and operated by the Bible Broadcasting Network and it carries a Christian talk and teaching radio format. National religious leaders heard on WYHI include Chuck Swindoll, Joni Eareckson Tada, Adrian Rogers and J. Vernon McGee. The station is listener-supported and seeks donations on the air.

WYHI has an effective radiated power (ERP) of 50,000 watts, the maximum for most Illinois stations. The transmitter is on West County Line Road in Peotone, near Interstate 57.

== History ==
=== WKAK ===
The station signed on the air on January 5, 1962. From its launch until 1975, the station had the call sign WKAK. It was originally owned by Kenneth Baker, Willis Maltby, and Claude Baker. WKAK was originally licensed to Kankakee, Illinois, with its call letters representing its city of license. The transmitter was located 2.9 miles north of the city limits, and it had an effective radiated power (ERP) of 6,600 watts at a height above average terrain (HAAT) of 210 feet. It was Kankakee's first FM station.

In the 1960s, the station aired a beautiful music format, with mostly instrumental cover versions of popular adult songs. In 1969, it began adding some soft vocals in the evening. By 1972, the majority of the station's playlist was popular music, with standards comprising a quarter of the station's playlist. In June 1972, the station's format was changed to country music. In late 1974, Claude Baker and Luella Feller sold the station to Harry Fitzgerald, Howard Dybedock, and Benedict Cerven Sr. for $132,315.

=== WBYG ===
On April 7, 1975, the station's call sign was changed to WBYG. The station's branding called it "The Big One". As WBYG, the station began airing an adult contemporary format. In 1979, the station's transmitter was moved to Peotone, Illinois, along the Kankakee County/Will County border, and its ERP and HAAT were increased to 50kW and 500 feet respectively.

By 1979, WBYG began airing an album-oriented rock format. In early 1984, Harry Fitzgerald, Howard Dybedock, and Ben Cerven sold the station to Gene Milner Broadcasting for $1.2 million.

=== The Bus ===
On February 15, 1985, the station's call sign was changed to WBSW. It was branded as "The Bus". The Bus continued WBYG's album rock format. Shortly after the station's launch, a 20 foot long bus shaped balloon used to advertise the station broke loose from its tethers and floated away, prompting the FAA to issue a warning to pilots.

Soon thereafter, the Bus flipped to a CHR/Top 40 format. The station's call sign was changed to WBUS on April 1, 1987. The station aired Casey's Top 40 on Sunday mornings. It also played dance mixes at night. The Bus lasted until 1996, when Milner Broadcasting sold the station to Z-Spanish Network for $7 million. "The Bus" branding would return to a CHR station in the area in 1998, on 100.7 WBVS in Coal City, Illinois.

=== Spanish language formats ===
Z-Spanish Network launched a Regional Mexican format on the station, branded "La Zeta". On September 23, 1996, the station's call sign was changed to WRZA. In 2000, Z-Spanish Network was acquired by Entravision Communications. On December 29, 2000, the station changed to a Spanish CHR format branded "Super Estrella", which was simulcast on sister station WZCH 103.9 in Dundee, Illinois. In May 2001, the station's city of license was changed from Kankakee to Park Forest, Illinois. In 2004, Entravision Communications sold the station, along with 750 AM WNDZ, to Newsweb Corporation for $24 million.

=== Nine FM and Dance Factory ===
In June 2004, Newsweb launched an adult hits format on the station, branded as "Nine FM", with the slogan "We Play Anything". After Newsweb purchased other rimshot stations, Nine FM's programming expanded to WKIE (92.7 FM) in the north suburbs and WDEK (92.5 FM) west of the Chicago area on November 29, 2004. Sky Daniels was the original program director for Nine FM. When he left in 2005, he was replaced by Matt DuBiel.

In 2006, Chris Chudzik began leasing air time for a dance music show called Dance Factory. Initially airing overnight on Saturdays, the program was expanded to seven nights a week on May 14, 2007. Dance Factory continued to air overnight until Newsweb sold the station, even as the station's daytime format changed.

=== Progressive talk ===
Newsweb Corporation dropped the Nine FM programming on all three signals Monday, October 20, 2008, and replaced it with a simulcast of sister station WCPT 820's progressive talk programming from 5 A.M. until 9 P.M. The Nine FM format moved to WKIF 92.7 in Kankakee. The station's call sign was changed to WCPQ on October 27, 2008.

=== Polski FM ===
On June 2, 2014, WCPQ and WCPY broke away from the Progressive Talk simulcast and changed their format to Polish-language news, talk and music. It was branded as "Polski FM". After the station's sale to Bible Broadcasting Network, Polski FM briefly moved to WMFN AM 640.

=== Bible Broadcasting Network ===
On March 20, 2018, Newsweb announced it would sell WCPQ to the Bible Broadcasting Network for $5,099,000. The sale was consummated on May 31, 2018. On that day, the new owners changed the station's call sign to WYHI. The station joined the Bible Broadcasting Network on June 12, 2018.
