= Wayne Larrivee =

American sportscaster

- Born: Wayne Larrivee; Lee, Massachusetts, U.S.
- Education: Emerson College
- Spouse: Julie Larrivee
- Children: 2
- Sports commentary career
- Genre: Play-by-play
- Sports: National Football League, Major League Baseball, National Basketball Association, College football, Minor League Baseball, College basketball

Wayne Larrivee is an American sportscaster. Larrivee is currently the radio play-by-play voice of the Green Bay Packers on the Packers Radio Network alongside color commentator Larry McCarren and calls college football and basketball for the Big Ten Network on television. Despite his current job with the Packers, Larrivee has long been associated with Chicago sports, having spent time as the voice of the Chicago Cubs, over a decade as the voice of the Chicago Bears and nearly twenty years as the television voice of the Chicago Bulls.

== Biography ==
=== Early life and career ===
Larrivee was born in Lee, Massachusetts and attended Emerson College in Boston, where he graduated in 1977 with a degree in mass communications.

During his time at Emerson, he practiced the craft of play by play by spending many nights in the old Boston Garden, calling games from high above courtside into his trusty tape recorder. He would astound the regular news staff at WECB, the Emerson carrier current station, with after game interviews, and up-close reflections on the actions of the night during the 10 PM extended news broadcast.

After beginning his professional career at KGRO Radio in Pampa, Texas in 1975, Larrivee moved to KSTT Radio in Davenport, Iowa where he announced University of Iowa football games, Quad City Angels minor league baseball games and high school basketball games.

From 1978 through 1984, Larrivee did play-by-play for the Kansas City Chiefs on KCMO radio.

In 1985, Larrivee was hired to be the radio voice for the Chicago Bears and held that position until the end of the 1998 NFL season, when he took over as voice of the Packers the following year. At each stop, Larrivee succeeded iconic play-by-play announcers, Joe McConnell in Chicago and Jim Irwin in Green Bay.

He has called two Super Bowl victories; the Bears' in Super Bowl XX and the Packers' in Super Bowl XLV.

Larrivee also was the television play-by-play announcer for the Chicago Bulls for WGN-TV for seventeen seasons. At various times he has also called games for the Chicago Cubs, Kansas City Kings, Iowa Hawkeyes football, Missouri Tigers basketball, and Big Ten football and basketball for ESPN Plus.

Larrivee also works for Dial Global's Westwood One sports division, calling NCAA basketball tournament games and serving as a substitute announcer for NFL games carried over the network.

In his spare time, Larrivee voices the Badger Mutual Insurance Sports Minute in Wisconsin and several other states. In addition, he voices the Badger Mutual Insurance "In the Tunnel" for Green Bay Packers games.

=== Other broadcast assignments ===
Throughout the NFL season, Larrivee also hosts a nationally syndicated radio show with Pro Football Weekly publisher Hub Arkush.

On April 23, 2000, Larrivee substituted for Al Albert as WTTV's play-by-play announcer during the Indiana Pacers' 88–85 victory over the Milwaukee Bucks in Game 1 of their first-round playoff series.

On July 18, 2007, Larrivee was named the #2 play-by-play announcer for football games on the Big Ten Network. Larrivee works the telecasts with former Northwestern and Chicago Bears defensive back Chris Martin. Thom Brennaman was named the lead announcer on the same date.

On October 10, 2017, Larrivee was announced to be the television play-by-play announcer for the Milwaukee Panthers men's basketball team.

=== Trademarks ===
At crucial moments at the end of games, Larrivee refers to a clinching point as "The Dagger." An incorrect 'dagger' had never been called until the 2012 NFL season in which he presumed a Packers victory near the end of a September 24 game against the Seattle Seahawks, but the Seahawks scored a controversial touchdown to give them the victory. In 2011, Larrivee teamed up with Sheboygan, Wisconsin-based advertising agency DuFour Advertising to start selling merchandise with his signature phrase.
