= WFAV =

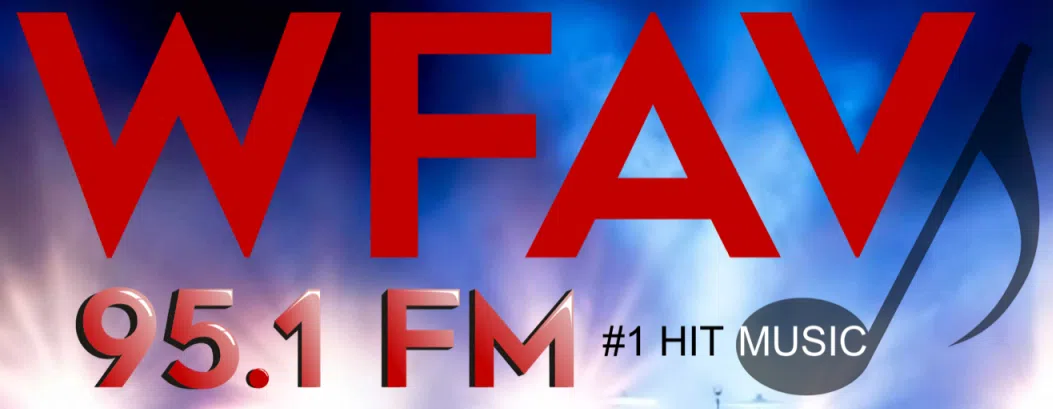
- Kankakee, Illinois; United States
- Broadcast area: Kankakee, Illinois
- Frequency: 95.1 MHz (HD Radio)
- Branding: WFAV 95.1

Programming
- Format: Top 40 (CHR)
- Subchannels: HD2: Simulcast of WIVR (country)
- Affiliations: Premiere Networks

Ownership
- Owner: Milner Media Partners, LLC
- Sister stations: WVLI; WYUR; WIVR

History
- First air date: October 1992
- Former call signs: WKVF (1990–1992); WZZP (1992–1995); WVLI (1995–2012); WKIF (2012–2013)
- Call sign meaning: "Favorite Hits"

Technical information
- Licensing authority: FCC
- Facility ID: 42656
- Class: A
- ERP: 2,300 watts
- HAAT: 112 meters (367 ft)
- Transmitter coordinates: 41.078°N 87.756°W
- Translator: HD2: 96.1 W241BS (Bourbonnais)

Links
- Public license information: Public file; LMS
- Webcast: Listen live
- Website: www.wfav951.com

WFAV (95.1 FM) "Your FAVorites from the 2000's [sic] to NOW!" is a radio station licensed to Kankakee, Illinois. WFAV has a Contemporary hit radio format and is owned by Milner Media Partners.

== History ==
The station was built by Dennis Baldridge and Richard Shelton, engineers at 89.7 WONU, and originally held the call sign WKVF. As the station was coming on the air, it was sold to Rollings Communications for $90,000. Its call sign was changed to WZZP by the time it began broadcasting in October 1992. The station aired a classic rock format, and was part of a simulcast with 95.3 WZNF in Rantoul, Illinois and 107.9 WZNX in Arcola, Illinois. In 1995, the station was sold to Milner Broadcasting, headed by Tim Milner, for $425,000.

In March 1995, the station adopted an oldies format, branded "The Valley", and the station's call sign was changed to WVLI. The station was simulcast on WFAV 103.7 from the station's sign-on in 2007 until 2011. WFAV 103.7 would end the simulcast and begin airing a CHR format. In August 2012, the station began simulcasting on 92.7 WKIF.

On December 27, 2012, 95.1 began simulcasting the CHR format of 103.7, and "The Valley" oldies format was moved to 92.7. The two stations became known as 95.1 & 103.7 Hit Radio for the Kankakee River Valley. On December 29, 2012, the WKIF calls moved from 92.7 to 95.1 and the WVLI calls moved from 95.1 to 92.7. On February 20, 2013, the station's call sign was changed to WFAV (which moved from 103.7) and its simulcast with 103.7 ended, as 103.7 adopted a country format as WYUR, which is a simulcast of 101.7 WIVR. In 2018, Milner Broadcasting was sold to the newly formed Milner Media Partners.

== Translator ==
Call sign	Frequency	City of license	FID	ERP (W)	HAAT	Class	Transmitter coordinates	FCC info
W241BS	96.1 FM	Bourbonnais, Illinois	140888	250	66.4 m (218 ft)	D	41°9′39.1″N 87°52′30.2″W	LMS
