= Melissa Forman =

American television and radio personality

Melissa Forman is an American television and radio personality. She grew up in Northbrook, Illinois, where she attended Glenbrook North High School. She went on to graduate college from the University of Illinois at Urbana–Champaign. In 2008 Melissa received a Distinguished Alumnus Award from Glenbrook North where she was recognized for her leadership as an outstanding radio broadcaster and for her contribution to the community. She has been one of only a few women to lead a morning radio show and the first woman in the country to simultaneously host both a show in the morning and in the afternoon drive (at 93.9 WLIT-Chicago). She has also helped raise over $500,000 for local charities.

Melissa's radio career started in Champaign, Illinois, where she worked as an intern and received her first break imitating Bart Simpson on Mix 94.5. That break led to an incredibly successful five-year, on- air teaming with her partner, Jerome Ritchie. She then moved to Cincinnati where she worked at Mix 94.1. In 1999, she moved home to Chicago where she worked at WKIE 92.7/5 (KISS FM). In 2001 she started hosting morning drive at WLIT-FM 93.9 in Chicago until August 2009. Forman returned as morning host on WLIT in May 2018.

Her on-air radio adventures have taken her flying at six G's in fighter jets, hot air ballooning live on the air, sitting in 17,000 seats in chilly November at Memorial Stadium in order to raise money for a children's charity, and living in a shopping mall for four straight days.

Melissa joined WCIU-TV (The "U") to Co-Host "You & Me This Morning" in 2009 until 2017 with Jeanne Sparrow. She woke up Chicago from 6- 8 am with celebrity interviews, news with a positive turn, and uplifting banter with the people who make that city so interesting.
