= WCPY =

Polish radio station in Arlington Heights–Chicago, Illinois

Coordinates: 42.137091°N 87.982496°W

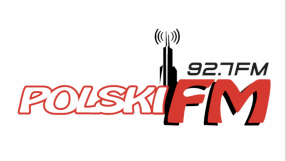

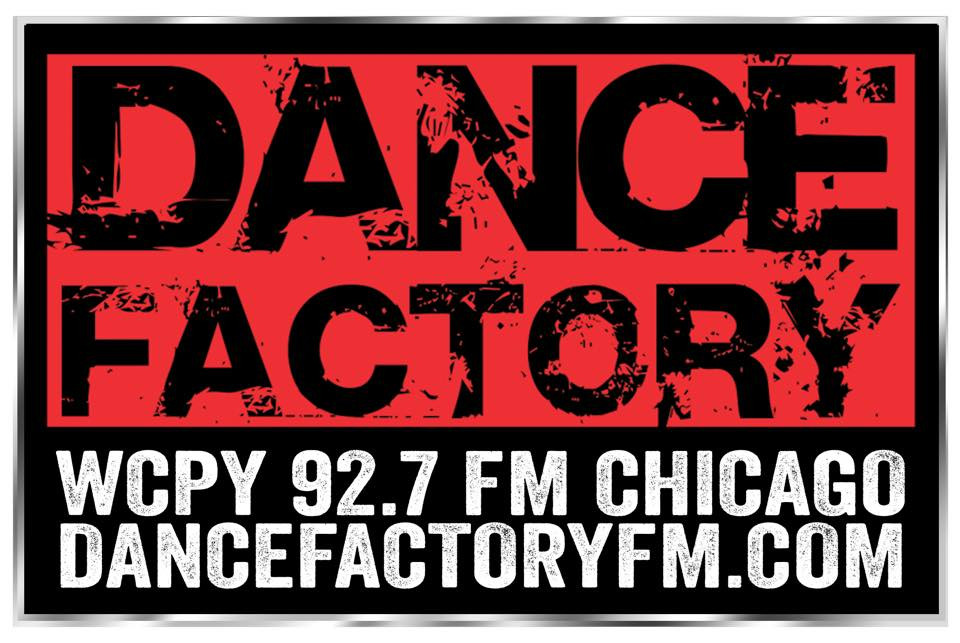
- Arlington Heights, Illinois; United States
- Broadcast area: Chicago metropolitan area
- Frequency: 92.7 MHz
- Branding: Daytime: Polski FM; Nighttime: Dance Factory FM

Programming
- Format: Daytime: Polish; Nighttime: Dance hits

Ownership
- Owner: Rhythm Enterprises LLC

History
- First air date: March 10, 1960
- Former call signs: WNWC (1960–1968); WEXI (1968–1972); WWMM (1972–1981); WTCO (1981–1983); WSEX (1983–1989); WCBR-FM (1989–1998); WKIE (1998–2008); WCPT-FM (2008–2014)

Technical information
- Licensing authority: FCC
- Facility ID: 15520
- Class: A
- ERP: 1,800 watts
- HAAT: 116 meters (381 ft)

Links
- Public license information: Public file; LMS
- Website: www.polski.fm; www.dancefactoryfm.com

WCPY (92.7 FM) is a radio station licensed to Arlington Heights, Illinois, and serving the Chicago metropolitan area. WCPY airs a Polish language format during the daytime, as "Polski FM", while airing a dance hits format at night known as "Dance Factory FM".

The station is owned by Rhythm Enterprises LLC. WCPY transmits on a tower with WPPN and WPNA-FM in nearby Buffalo Grove at 1,800 watts.

== History ==
=== WNWC ===
The station began broadcasting on March 10, 1960, holding the call sign WNWC ("North West Communities"). In July 1961, the station was purchased by Bob Atcher and Thomas Hogan. WNWC would air a wide variety of non-rock music. It aired four hours of country music a day before increasing it to 12 hours a day in November 1963. In 1965, Lester Vihon purchased the station for $110,000. By 1966, it was airing hard rock evenings. The station was off the air temporarily in June 1966, after a tornado toppled its tower. In early 1968, the station was sold to auto dealer Walter Mack for $150,000.

=== WEXI ===
In April 1968, the station's call sign was changed to WEXI, and was branded "Stereo Excitement". WEXI aired easy listening music during the day and a progressive rock format overnight. Shortly thereafter, it adopted a top 40 format. In November 1970, the station adopted a beautiful music format, with the slogan "Spreading Clean Air over Chicagoland".

=== WWMM ===
In autumn 1972, the station was sold to Community Broadcasters for $230,000, and its call sign was changed to WWMM. WWMM aired contemporary middle of the road music, along with some talk programs. Among the shows on WWMM in this period was "Love in the Afternoon", a sex talk program hosted by Jonathan Kingsley. By 1976, the station had adopted a jazz format. In 1976, the station was sold to Northwest Community Broadcasting for $500,000. By 1977, WWMM was airing a MOR-adult contemporary format, with the slogan "Radio for the Great Northwest".

=== WTCO ===
In spring of 1981, the station was sold to Radio Communications Group and its call sign was changed to WTCO. WTCO aired a country music format. In 1982, the station was sold to Darrell Peters Productions for $550,000.

=== WSEX ===
Darrell Peters Productions applied to change the station's call sign to WSEX on September 26, 1982, but the application was rejected. An application to reconsider was submitted, and the call sign change was approved on January 24, 1983. WSEX aired an adult contemporary format called "Love Songs & More". In January 1986, the station adopted a "Top 10" format, playing songs that had reached the top 10 within the past five years.

=== WCBR-FM ===
The station became "Chicago's Bear", and its call sign was changed to WCBR-FM on January 9, 1989. WCBR-FM aired an adult album alternative format. Among the air talent heard on 'The Bear' in the 90's...Ken Sumka, Tommy Lee Johnston, Greg Easterling, Mark Zander, Dave Loeshke. As the 90's progressed, it began to air brokered programming nights and weekends. WCBR-FM also aired Chicago Wolves hockey.

In 1998, the station was sold to Big City Radio for $17 million. Many of the brokered programs that were on WCBR-FM moved to 94.3 WJKL in Elgin. Purchased by Big City Radio at the same time was 92.7 WLRT in Kankakee. When Big City Radio took control of the two stations, they stunted with a simulcast of their Los Angeles sister station 107.1 KLYY, which aired a modern rock format. WLRT's call sign was changed to WBRO shortly thereafter.

=== 92 Kiss FM (WKIE-FM) ===
92 Kiss FM logo

On November 14, 1998, at Noon, WCBR and WBRO launched their new official format, CHR as "92.7 Kiss FM", with the first song being "Kiss" by Prince. This would be Chicago's first true CHR station in many years and proved to be quite successful, even with the two stations' weak signals. In late December 1998, the station's call sign was changed to WKIE, while WBRO's call sign was changed to WKIF. Big City Radio also purchased WDEK 92.5 in DeKalb, Illinois, which was airing a locally programmed CHR format at the time, and switched it to a simulcast of WKIE and WKIF in early 1999. Not long after, the moniker was adjusted to "92 Kiss FM". Melissa Forman hosted mornings on 92 Kiss FM, before moving to 93.9 WLIT-FM in 2001.

=== Energy 92.7&5 ===
On January 12, 2001, Clear Channel's WUBT changed formats from rhythmic oldies to CHR as WKSC-FM "Kiss 103.5". At that time, Clear Channel filed suit against Big City Radio, alleging the "Kiss FM" branding used by WKIE and its simulcasts violated its national trademark. However, Big City Radio had already planned on changing the formats of these stations. On January 26, 2001, 92 Kiss-FM signed off, and the three stations adopted a dance hits format as "Energy 92.7&5". The station's airstaff remained intact. The new format was designed by 92 Kiss FM's program director, Chris Shebel, who has stated that the dance hits format is something he had dreamed of doing for a long time.

=== Onda 92 ===
In late 2002, Big City Radio, became insolvent and began the process of selling all of its radio stations. In early 2003, WKIE, WKIF and WDEK were sold to Spanish Broadcasting System for $22 million. On January 6, 2003, the three stations adopted a Spanish contemporary format as "Onda 92".

=== Nine FM / Dance Factory ===
In 2004, Spanish Broadcasting System sold WKIE, WKIF and WDEK to Newsweb Corporation for $28 million. At 9 a.m. November 29, 2004, WKIE and WDEK began simulcasting with its new adult hits sister station 99.9 WRZA in Park Forest, Illinois, as "Nine FM", with the slogan "We Play Anything". The first song on the Nine FM simulcast was "With or Without You" by U2. Sky Daniels was the original program director for Nine FM. When he left in 2005, he was replaced by Matt DuBiel.

In 2006, Chris Chudzik began leasing air time for a dance music show called Dance Factory. Initially airing overnight on Saturdays, the program was expanded to seven nights a week on May 14, 2007. Dance Factory has continued to air overnight on the station, even as its daytime format has changed.

=== Chicago's Progressive Talk (WCPT-FM) ===
Newsweb Corporation dropped the Nine FM programming on all three signals on October 20, 2008, and replaced it with a simulcast of sister station WCPT from 5 a.m. until 9 p.m. The Nine FM format moved to WKIF 92.7 in Kankakee. On October 27, 2008, the station changed its callsign from WKIE to WCPT-FM, to go with the format.

=== Polski FM (WCPY) ===
On June 2, 2014, WCPT-FM and 99.9 WCPQ broke away from the progressive talk simulcast and changed their daytime format to Polish, branded as "Polski FM". WCPT-FM then swapped callsigns with 92.5 WCPY in DeKalb, which remained part of the progressive talk simulcast. In 2018, 99.9 WCPQ was sold to Bible Broadcasting Network, and it adopted a Christian format as WYHI. Polski FM was then briefly simulcast on 640 WMFN in the summer of 2018. In October 2024, Newsweb sold WCPY to Mina Georgalas' Rhythm Enterprises LLC for $3 million; three of the company's members are associated with the "Polski FM" programming.
