= KLVM (FM) =

K-Love radio station in Santa Cruz, California

Coordinates: 36.534722°N 121.620556°W

- Santa Cruz, California; United States
- Broadcast area: Central Coast of California
- Frequency: 88.9 MHz (HD Radio)

Programming
- Format: Contemporary Christian music
- Subchannels: HD2: K-Love Eras; HD3: Radio Nueva Vida; HD4: KAMB simulcast
- Network: K-Love

Ownership
- Owner: Educational Media Foundation

History
- First air date: 1972
- Former call signs: KUSP (1972–2018)
- Former frequencies: 89.1 MHz (1972–1974)
- Call sign meaning: "K-Love Monterey"

Technical information
- Licensing authority: FCC
- Facility ID: 51718
- Class: B
- ERP: 1,250 watts
- HAAT: 761 meters (2,497 ft)
- Translators: 89.1 K206BQ (Hollister); HD3: 93.5 K228FD (Monterey); HD4: 96.3 K242AT (Salinas, Etc.)

Links
- Public license information: Public file; LMS
- Webcast: Listen Live; Listen Live (HD2)
- Website: klove.com nuevavida.com (HD3)

KLVM (88.9 MHz) is an FM radio station broadcasting a Contemporary Christian music format. Licensed to Santa Cruz, California, United States, the station is an affiliate of the K-LOVE Christian music radio network and is owned by Educational Media Foundation. The signal covers much of California's Central Coast.

== Pataphysical Broadcasting Foundation, 1972 ==
David Freedman and Lorenzo Milam started KUSP, as Pataphysical Broadcasting Foundation, Inc. on 89.1 MHz in 1972, broadcasting from downtown Santa Cruz. In May 1974, it moved the transmitter to the much higher Mt. Toro, increased power from 10 watts to 1,250 watts ERP and changed frequency from 89.1 to 88.9 MHz.

It broadcast music, and programs of local interest and later added programs from NPR. On November 1, 2015, the format changed to an adult album alternative, with a few news and information programs.

On August 1, 2016, KUSP ceased programming and on August 12 declared bankruptcy.

== Educational Media Foundation, 2016 ==
On December 19, 2016, the Educational Media Foundation filed an application with the FCC to purchase the license for $605,000. The application was granted on February 6, 2017, and the purchase was consummated on March 16, 2017.

Educational Media Foundation resumed the operation of KUSP on April 5, 2017. On April 5, 2017, it filed applications with the FCC to sell the licenses of the K207CN, K217EK and K237EV translators to California State University, Monterey Bay (owner of KAZU) for $5,000. The applications were consummated on June 30, 2017, and July 7, 2017.

On April 21, 2017, KUSP was granted a Federal Communications Commission construction permit to move the transmitter site of translator K206BQ .708 miles to Fremont Peak and decrease the effective radiated power from 200 watts to 150 watts. The station changed its call sign to KLVM on January 22, 2018. KLVM broadcasts 1 HD subchannel on 88.9 HD2 airing the K-Love Classics format.
