= KSQT =

Radio station in California, United States

KSQD simulcast
- Prunedale, California; United States
- Broadcast area: Monterey Bay Area
- Frequency: 89.7 MHz
- Branding: KSQD Community Radio

Programming
- Format: Community radio; Variety

Ownership
- Owner: Natural Bridges Media
- Sister stations: KSQD

History
- First air date: 1987
- Former call signs: KFMP (1987–1988); KCLM (1988); KLVM (1988–2018); KNVM (2018–2023)

Technical information
- Licensing authority: FCC
- Facility ID: 72566
- Class: B
- ERP: 450 watts
- HAAT: 715 meters
- Transmitter coordinates: 36°45′22.00″N 121°30′06.00″W
- Translator: 89.5 K208GE (Monterey)

Links
- Public license information: Public file; LMS
- Webcast: Listen live
- Website: ksqd.org

KSQT (89.7 FM) is a radio station licensed to serve Prunedale, California. The nonprofit community radio station is owned by Natural Bridges Media, and airs a variety format.

== Swap to Educational Media Foundation ==
Prunedale Educational Association announced it would be swapping the then-KLVM and its five translators to Educational Media Foundation (EMF) for KARW Salinas. The transaction was consummated on December 19, 2017. EMF changed the station's call sign to KNVM on January 22, 2018. In 2019, EMF flipped KNVM to its Radio Nueva Vida programming.

== 2023 sale and format change ==
On February 5, 2023, Natural Bridges Media, owner of KSQD in Santa Cruz, California, announced that it would acquire KNVM 89.7 FM and the 89.5 K208GE translator in Monterey from EMF. The sale closed on June 8, 2023, and on June 17, KNVM flipped to a simulcast of KSQD to reach the Monterey-Salinas area, which is poorly covered by the original KSQD signal. The station changed its callsign to KSQT on June 24, 2023.
