= WLWX (FM) =

K-Love Classics radio station in Wheaton, Illinois

- Wheaton, Illinois; United States
- Broadcast area: DuPage County
- Frequency: 88.1 MHz
- Branding: K-Love Eras

Programming
- Format: Christian hits
- Network: K-Love Eras

Ownership
- Owner: Educational Media Foundation
- Sister stations: WAWE, WAWY, WCKL, WCLR, WOKL, WSRI, WZKL

History
- Founded: 1947 (carrier-current AM)
- First air date: 1962
- Former call signs: WETN (1962–2017); WAIW (2017–2021)

Technical information
- Licensing authority: FCC
- Facility ID: 66499
- Class: A
- ERP: 250 watts
- HAAT: 43 meters (141 ft)
- Transmitter coordinates: 41°52′9.00″N 88°5′56.00″W

Links
- Public license information: Public file; LMS
- Webcast: Listen live

WLWX (88.1 FM) is a radio station that is broadcasting K-Love Eras. Licensed to Wheaton, Illinois, United States, it serves the Chicago area. The station is currently owned by the Educational Media Foundation (EMF), which acquired it from Wheaton College in 2017.

== History ==
Wheaton College's first carrier-current AM station went on the air in 1947 as WHON. It moved to become licensed 88.1 FM WETN in 1962. In 1979, the station was authorized to raise its power to 250 watts. Originally operating just 23 hours a week, the station began broadcasting 24 hours a day in 1984.

EMF purchased the license for WETN from Wheaton College effective February 28, 2017 for $150,000. The station changed its call sign to WAIW on March 1, 2017, and carried the Air 1 Christian Hits format until August 2018, when it flipped to the Christian classic hits K-Love Classics format.

Under the K-LOVE Classics branding, WAIW aired music by artists such as Bryan Duncan, Amy Grant, Keith Green, Michael W. Smith, 4 Him, and Steven Curtis Chapman. On January 1, 2021, WAIW started airing K-LOVE 90's. On March 26th, 2026. WLWX started airing K-LOVE Eras.

On January 11, 2021, WAIW swapped call signs with EMF's Winchester, Virginia-based WLWX.
