= WAWE =

Air 1 radio station in Glendale Heights, Illinois

Coordinates: 41.858361°N 87.954500°W

- Glendale Heights, Illinois; United States
- Broadcast area: Chicago Metropolitan Area
- Frequency: 94.3 MHz
- Branding: Air1

Programming
- Format: Christian worship
- Affiliations: Air1

Ownership
- Owner: Educational Media Foundation
- Sister stations: WCKL; WLWX; WOKL; WSRI; WZKL

History
- First air date: September 1960
- Former call signs: WRMN-FM (1960–1972); WJKL (1972–2019)

Technical information
- Licensing authority: FCC
- Facility ID: 19221
- Class: A
- ERP: 3,500 watts
- HAAT: 134 meters (440 ft)

Links
- Public license information: Public file; LMS
- Webcast: Listen live
- Website: www.air1.com

WAWE (94.3 FM) is a radio station broadcasting a Christian worship music format, licensed to Glendale Heights, Illinois, United States. The station serves the Chicago Metropolitan Area and is owned by the Educational Media Foundation, broadcasting its Air1 format.

== History ==
=== WRMN-FM ===
The station began broadcasting in September 1960 and held the call sign WRMN-FM, simulcasting AM 1410 WRMN. The station was located in Elgin, Illinois, and had an ERP of 1,000 watts at a HAAT of 130 feet (40 m). By 1965, the station had begun airing programming independent of AM 1410. In 1965, the station's ERP was increased to 3,000 watts and its HAAT was decreased to 115 feet (35 m). In 1972, the station's HAAT was increased to 210 feet (64 m) and its ERP was reduced to 2,500 watts.

=== Progressive rock era ===
In 1972, the station adopted the call letters WJKL, which was based on the name of the station manager at the time, Richard Jakle. In 1974, WJKL adopted a progressive rock format, and was branded "The Fox". In 1975, the station's ERP was increased to 3,000 watts. In July 1980, the station dropped all local talent becoming fully automated, airing an album-oriented rock format. Live personalities were brought back in April 1981.

=== Big band era ===
In September 1982, the station adopted a big band/adult standards format, with the branding "JKL 94" "Great Music". The station featured music from the 1930s, 1940s, 1950s, and 1960s. When Radio Was, hosted by Carl Amari, aired nightly on the station. In 1984, the station's HAAT was increased to 328 feet (100 m).

=== Adult contemporary era ===
In May 1990, WJKL adopted an adult contemporary format and revived "The Fox" branding. The station carried programming from the Satellite Music Network, along with local programs such as the Radio Shopping Show. In 1990, the station's ERP was increased to 6,000 watts. In 1998, the station added brokered programming at night. On February 9, 1998, Heavy metal radio format "Rebel Radio" began broadcasting overnights

=== One on One Sports ===
On March 1, 1999, became a brokered affiliate of One on One Sports (later called Sporting News Radio), airing One on One Sports programming from 6 a.m. to 4 p.m. One on One Sports moved to the station from AM 950 WIDB.

=== K-Love ===
On March 1, 2001, Sporting News Radio moved to AM 820 WYPA and Rebel Radio signed off as well as all other brokered programming on the station, and the station began to sell its airtime to Educational Media Foundation which broadcast its K-LOVE Christian adult contemporary format. In 2007, Elgin Broadcasting Company sold WJKL to Educational Media Foundation for $17 million.

After purchasing the station in 2007, Educational Media Foundation changed WJKL's city of license from Elgin to Glendale Heights. In 2010, the station's transmitter was moved from Elgin to the Oakbrook Terrace Tower in Oakbrook Terrace, Illinois, moving to a higher location closer to Chicago, while reducing its power to 3,500 watts ERP.

=== Air1 ===
On March 10, 2018, K-LOVE moved to 97.9 WLUP-FM (now WCKL). In summer of 2018, WJKL became an affiliate of Educational Media Foundation's Christian CHR network Air1. The station changed its call sign to WAWE on July 11, 2019. The WJKL callsign was moved to K-LOVE's station serving San Juan, Puerto Rico.
