= Hub Arkush =

American sportswriter

Herb "Hub" Arkush
- Born: Herb Arkush; February 14, 1953 (age 73); Deerfield, Illinois, United States
- Education: Southern Illinois University; University of Michigan
- Occupations: Editor and general manager Journalist; Sideline reporter
- Employer(s): Chicago Football; Westwood One; Chicago Sun Times; Chicago Daily Herald
- Television: Pro Football Weekly
- Spouse: Candace
- Children: 3

Herb "Hub" Arkush (born February 14, 1953) is an American football sportscaster and analyst. He is the editor and general manager of Chicago Football and ChicagoFootball.com, a magazine and website devoted to coverage and analysis of all things football in northern Illinois, particularly the Chicago Bears. He also is the publisher and editor of Pro Football Weekly.

== Early life ==
Arkush attended Deerfield High School and attended college at Southern Illinois University before transferring to the University of Michigan, where he majored in English and physical education.

== Career ==
Since 2013, Arkush has teamed with Shawn Media to lead the Chicago Football project. Chicago Football is a magazine, website and TV show dedicated to coverage of the Bears and other football topics relevant to northern Illinois. He created and co-hosted the syndicated Pro Football Weekly radio and TV shows, and also worked as a radio commentator on the Chicago Bears Radio Network from 1987 to 2004. Since 2006 he has also served as an analyst and sideline reporter on the Westwood One national radio broadcasts of NFL games, and is a contributor to WBBM radio and WBBM-TV. As an NFL insider, he is a regular fill-in host and contributor for sports radio station (and WBBM radio sister station) WSCR.

Arkush stirred controversy by stating he would not vote for Green Bay Packers quarterback Aaron Rodgers for MVP in the wake of the 2021 season. He did not specifically state that Rodgers' COVID-19 vaccination status entered into the decision. Instead, referring to Rodgers' 2021 training camp standoff with the Packers, Arkush said, "I don't think you can be the biggest jerk in the league and punish your team, and your organization and your fan base the way he did and be the Most Valuable Player." Rodgers, in turn, called Arkush an "absolute bum".

== Personal life ==
Arkush and his wife, Candace, have three children; Billy (b. 1978), Arthur (b. 1982), and Taylor (b. 1985). He is of Romanian descent.
