= Joyce (name) =

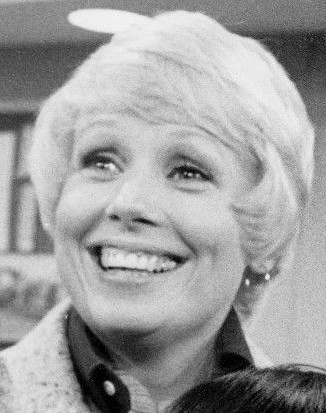
- Joyce Bulifant, American actress known for her role as Marie Slaughter in the television sitcom The Mary Tyler Moore Show.
- Gender: Unisex
- Language: Irish, French, English, Portuguese (particularly in Brazil)

Joyce is an Irish and French given name and surname. It is derived from the Old French masculine name Josse, which derived from the Latin name Iudocus, the Latinized form of the Breton name Judoc meaning "lord". The name became rare after the 14th century, but was later revived as a female given name, which derived from the Middle English joise meaning "rejoice".

The name originated with Saint Joyce (Judoc) (600–668), a Breton prince and hermit and the son of Judicael, king of Brittany.

== As a given name ==
- Joyce Anderson (1923–2014), American furniture designer and woodworker
- Joyce Anderson (artist) (1932–2022), Canadian painter and art teacher
- Joyce Ballantyne (1918–2006), American painter of pin-ups
- Joyce Dennys (1893–1991), English cartoonist, illustrator and painter
- Joyce Wieland (1931–1998), Canadian experimental filmmaker and mixed media artist

=== Business ===
- Joyce Chen (1917–1994), American chef and restaurateur
- Joyce Hall (1891–1982), American businessman and founder of Hallmark Cards
- Joyce Kiage, businesswoman from Papua New Guinea
- Joyce Nicholson (1919–2011), Australian author and businesswoman
- Joyce Smyth (born 1957), English solicitor

=== Film, television, and theater ===
- Joyce Blair (1932–2006), British actress and dancer
- Joyce Brothers (1927–2013), American psychologist, television personality, advice columnist, and writer
- Joyce Bulifant (born 1937), American actress
- Joyce Carey (1898–1993), British actress
- Joyce Chopra (born 1938), American film director
- Joyce Coad (1917–1987), American child actress
- Joyce Compton (1907–1997), American actress
- Joyce DeWitt (born 1949), American actress best known for her role in Three's Company
- Joyce Giraud (born 1975), Puerto Rican actress and model
- Joyce Godenzi (born 1965), Hong Kong beauty queen and actress of Chinese and Australian descent
- Joyce Gordon (1929–2020), American actress and union representative
- Joyce Grenfell (1910–1979), British actress, comedian and singer-songwriter
- Joyce Hyser (born 1957), American actress
- Joyce Jacobs (1922–2013), British character actress
- Joyce Jimenez (born 1978), Filipino American actress
- Joyce MacKenzie (1925–2021), American actress
- Joyce Nizzari (born 1940), American model and actress
- Joyce Randolph (1924–2024), American actress
- Joyce Redman (1915–2012), British actress
- Joyce Sparer Adler (1916–1999), American critic, playwright, and teacher
- Joyce Van Patten (born 1934), American actress

=== Literature and print ===
- Joyce Cary (1888–1957), Irish novelist
- Joyce Cavalcante (born 1949), Brazilian novelist
- Joyce Brabner (1952–2024), American writer of political comics
- Joyce Dyer (born 1947), American scholar and writer
- Joyce Elbert (1930–2009), American writer
- Joyce Hawkins (died 1992), English lexicographer and dictionary editor
- Joyce Jillson (1946–2004), American astrologer, actress, and author
- Joyce Johnson (author) (born 1935), American author
- Alfred Joyce Kilmer (1886–1918), American poet
- Joyce Lussu (1912–1998), Italian writer, translator, and partisan
- Joyce Mansour (1928–1986), British-Egyptian surrealist poet
- Joyce Maynard (born 1953), American writer
- Joyce Carol Oates (born 1938), American novelist
- Joyce Carol Thomas (1938–2016), African American playwright, illustrator, and author of children's books

=== Music ===
- Joyce Auguste, Saint Lucian musician and leader of The Hewanorra Voices
- Joyce Blackham (1934–2018), British opera singer
- Joyce Cooling, American smooth jazz guitarist
- Joyce Cheng, Hong Kong Canadian singer and actress based in Hong Kong
- Joyce Chu, Malaysian singer
- Joyce DiDonato (born 1969), American opera singer
- Joyce Greer de Holesch (1918–2009), Australian concert pianist
- Joyce Hatto (1928–2006), British pianist, known for the extensive fraudulent release of other performer's live recordings under her own name
- Joyce Kennedy, American singer with the funk rock band Mother's Finest
- Joyce Moreno (musician) (born 1948), Brazilian singer-songwriter, formerly known as Joyce
- Joyce Paul (1937–2016), American country music singer
- Joyce Sims (1959–2022), American singer-songwriter and pianist
- Joyce Wright (1922–2020), British opera singer and actress
- Joyce Yang (born 1986), Korean pianist
- Joyce Zhao Hong Qiao (born 1979), Taiwanese actress and member of music group 7 Flowers

=== Politics ===
- Joyce Anelay, Baroness Anelay of St Johns (born 1947), Conservative member of the House of Lords
- Joyce Banda (born 1951), Malawian Member of Parliament
- Joyce Baird (1929–2015), British trade unionist
- Joyce Beatty (born 1950), American politician, member of the Ohio House of Representatives
- Joyce Butler (1910–1992), British Labour Co-operative politician
- Joyce Cusack (born 1942), American politician, member of the Florida House of Representatives
- Joyce Dees (born 1954), American politician, member of the Arkansas House of Representatives
- Joyce Fairbairn (1939–2022), Canadian Senator and first woman Leader of the Government in the Senate
- Joyce Gemayel, wife of former President of Lebanon Amin Gemayel and mother of the assassinated politician Pierre Amine Gemayel
- Joyce Henry, American politician, member of the Minnesota House of Representatives
- Joyce Hens Green (born 1928), American district court judge
- Joyce Karlin Fahey (born 1951), Venezuela-born American prosecutor, Los Angeles County Superior Court judge, and two-term mayor of Manhattan Beach, California
- Joyce L. Kennard (1941–2026), American judge, associate justice of the California Supreme Court
- Joyce Mojonnier (born 1943), American politician, California Assemblywoman from 1983 to 1991
- Joyce Mujuru (born 1956), Zimbabwean politician, co-vice-president of the Zanu-PF party
- Joyce Quin, Baroness Quin (born 1944), British Labour Party politician
- Joyce Elaine Roop (1952–1995), American attorney and environmental activist
- Joyce Savoline (born 1946), Canadian politician
- Joyce Steele (1909–1991), Australian politician and the first woman elected to the Parliament of South Australia
- Joyce Trimmer (1927–2008), Canadian politician
- Joyce Trindade (born 1996), Brazilian politician
- Joyce Watson (born 1955), Welsh Labour Party politician and Member of the National Assembly for Wales

=== Sports ===
- Joyce Barry (1919–1999), Australian cyclist
- Joyce Chepchumba (born 1970), Kenyan long-distance runner
- Joyce Edwards (born 2006), American basketball player
- Joyce King (1920–2001), Australian sprinter
- Joyce Moreno (footballer) (born 1974), Panamanian-Spanish footballer
- Joyce Slipp (born 1950), Canadian basketball player and coach
- Joyce Walker (born ca. 1961), American basketball player (Harlem Globetrotters) and coach
- Joyce Wethered (1901–1997), British golfer
- Joyce Ziske (born 1935), American golfer

=== Other ===
- Joyce Baird (diabetologist) (1929–2014), Scottish diabetes clinician and academic researcher
- Joyce Bishop (1896–1993), English educator
- Joyce Chiang (1970–1999), Taiwanese-American murdered in Washington, D.C.
- Joyce Cowan, New Zealand midwifery educator
- Joyce Echaquan (1982/83–2020), Atikamekw woman mistreated by hospital staff
- Joyce Gemayel, spouse of former Lebanese President Amine Gemayel
- Joyce Giraud (born 1975), Puerto Rican actress, Miss Universe 1998
- Joyce Ladner (born 1943), American sociologist and author
- Joyce Lambert (1917–2005), British botanist and ecologist
- Joyce Marcus, American archaeologist
- Joyce Meyer (born 1943), American Christian Evangelical author and speaker
- Joyce Ohajah, British journalist and news anchor
- Joyce Piliso-Seroke (born 1933), South African educator, activist, and community organizer
- Joyce K. Reynolds (1952–2015), American computer science professor
- Joyce Robinson (1925–2013), Jamaican public servant
- Joyce Rugg Gunn (b. 1914, d. after 1976), British lawyer, court official in Kenya
- Joyce Snell (born 1930), British statistician
- Joyce Ann Tyldesely, British archaeologist, academic, and freelance writer
- Joyce Vincent, British woman whose death went unnoticed for more than two years
- Joyce Waley-Cohen (1920–2013), English educationist and public servant
- Joyce Weisbecker (born 1958), American video game designer
- Joyce Winifred Vickery (1908–1979), Australian botanist

== As a surname ==
=== Business ===
- Alan Joyce (born 1966), Irish-Australian Qantas CEO
- David Joyce (1825–1904), American lumber baron and industrialist
- Morton Dean Joyce (1900–1989), American philatelist
- Patrick H. Joyce (1879–1946), American railroad executive
- Ron Joyce (1930–2019), Canadian billionaire and co-founder of Tim Horton's donut chain

=== Film, television, and theatre ===
- Alice Joyce (1890–1955), American actress
- Ben Joyce (actor), Welsh actor
- Brenda Joyce (actress) (1912–2009), American actress
- Elaine Joyce (born 1945), American actress
- Ella Joyce (born 1954), American actress
- Emily Joyce (born 1969), British actress
- Natalie Joyce (1902–1992), American film actress
- Peggy Hopkins Joyce (1893–1957), American actress
- Yootha Joyce (1927–1980), British actress

=== Literature and print ===
- Brenda Joyce (author) (born c.1963), American author
- Graham Joyce, British science fiction writer
- James Joyce (1882–1941), Irish novelist
- John A. Joyce (1842–1915), American military officer, poet and writer
- Michael Joyce (born 1945), American author and professor of English
- Patrick Weston Joyce (1827–1914), Irish author and brother of Robert Dwyer Joyce
- Rachel Joyce (born 1962), English novelist and radio playwright
- Robert Dwyer Joyce (1830–1883), Irish poet
- Stanislaus Joyce (1884–1955), Irish illustrator
- William Joyce (writer) (born 1959), American children's author, writer, and illustrator

=== Music ===
- Archibald Joyce, British composer (1873–1963)
- Don Joyce (musician) (1994–2015), member of the experimental music group Negativland
- Eileen Joyce (1912–1991), Australian pianist
- Mike Joyce (born 1963), British drummer with The Smiths
- Teddy Joyce (born Edmund John Cuthbertson; 1904–1941), Canadian swing bandleader and actor

=== Politics ===
- Barnaby Joyce (born 1967), Australian politician
- Brian A. Joyce (1962–2018), Democratic Senator from Massachusetts
- Charles Herbert Joyce (1830–1916), U.S. Representative from Vermont
- David Joyce (politician) (born 1957), U.S. Representative from Ohio
- Eric Joyce (born 1960), British politician and member of Parliament
- George Joyce (1618–1670?), agitator in the English Civil War
- Janet J. Joyce (1940–2015), Illinois state senator
- Jeremiah E. Joyce (born 1943), Illinois state senator
- Jerome J. Joyce (1939–2019), Illinois state senator
- John Joyce (New Zealand politician) (1839–1899), New Zealand politician
- Kevin Joyce (politician), Illinois State Representative
- Steven Joyce (born 1963), New Zealand politician
- William Joyce (1906–1946), Anglo-Irish Nazi propagandist (known as "Lord Haw-haw")

=== Religion ===
- Gilbert Cunningham Joyce (1866–1942), educator and Bishop of Monmouth
- Isaac Wilson Joyce (1836–1905), American bishop in the Methodist Episcopal Church
- Jeremiah Joyce (1763–1816), English Unitarian minister and writer

=== Sports ===
- Alan Joyce (born 1942), Australian Rules footballer
- Alexis Joyce (born 1983), American sprinter
- Ben Joyce (baseball) (born 2000), American baseball player
- Ben Joyce (footballer) (born 1989), English footballer
- Bill Joyce (1887–?), Scottish footballer
- Bill Joyce (baseball) (1865–1941), American baseball player
- Bob Joyce (ice hockey) (born 1966), Canadian ice hockey player
- Cecelia Joyce (born 1983), Irish cricketer
- Dan Joyce (born 1976), English stunt performer, skateboarder, and filmmaker
- Darragh Joyce (born 1997), Australian rules footballer
- David Oliver Joyce (born 1987), Irish boxer
- Dominick Joyce (born 1981), Irish cricketer
- Don Joyce (American football) (1929–2012), American football player
- Ed Joyce (born 1978), Irish cricketer
- Gus Joyce (born 1974), Irish cricketer
- Isobel Joyce (born 1983), Irish cricketer
- Jim Joyce (born 1955), Major League Baseball umpire
- Joan Joyce (1940–2022), American softball player and coach, among other sports
- Joe Joyce (born 1961), English footballer
- Joe Joyce (born 1985), British boxer
- John Joyce (footballer) (1877–1956), English goalkeeper, known as "Tiny"
- Kaelan Joyce (born 1982), Gibraltarian amateur boxer
- Kara Lynn Joyce (born 1985), American swimmer
- Leilani Joyce (born 1974), professional squash player from New Zealand
- Luke Joyce (born 1987), American soccer player for Carlisle United F.C.
- Mark Joyce (born 1983), English snooker player
- Matt Joyce (1972), American football player
- Matt Joyce (1984), Major League Baseball outfielder
- Michael Joyce (tennis player) (born 1973), American tennis player
- Pádraic Joyce (born 1977), Irish Gaelic football player for County Galway
- Rachel Joyce (born 1978), British triathlete
- Regina Joyce (born 1957), Irish long-distance runner
- Ryan Joyce (born 1985), English darts player
- Sean William Joyce (born 1967), English footballer
- Warren Joyce (born 1965), English footballer

=== Other ===
- Dominic Joyce, British mathematician
- Ernest Joyce (RNZAF officer) (1920–1944), New Zealand flying ace of the Second World War
- Gerald Joyce (born 1956), American scientist
- Kenyon A. Joyce, U.S. Army officer during World War II
- Kerry Joyce, American interior designer
- Lucia Joyce (1907–1982), Irish ballet dancer and daughter of writer James Joyce
- Maolra Seoighe (Myles Joyce), Irishman executed by British authorities
- Nan Joyce (1940–2018), Irish Travellers' right activist
- Philip Michael Joyce (1920–1942), U.S. Navy ensign for whom the U.S. destroyer escort USS Joyce (DE-317) is named
- Rosemary Joyce, American anthropologist
- Thomas Athol Joyce (1878–1942), British anthropologist
- Seoighe Inish Bearachain, Irish rowing champions

== Fictional characters ==
- Joyce Barry, character in The Prisoner
- Joyce Benson, character in the 1970s comedy Angie
- Joyce Byers, character in Stranger Things
- Joyce Davenport, character in Hill Street Blues
- Joyce Kinney, character in Family Guy
- Joyce Summers, character in Buffy the Vampire Slayer
- Gilda Joyce, character in the Gilda Joyce mystery novels

== See also ==
- Joyce Country, a region of counties Galway in Ireland in which the Joyce family name is common.
