= Senator Joyce =

Senator Joyce may refer to:

- Brian A. Joyce (1962–2018), Massachusetts State Senate
- Janet J. Joyce (1940–2015), Illinois State Senate
- Jeremiah E. Joyce (born 1943), Illinois State Senate
- Jerome J. Joyce (1939–2019), Illinois State Senate
- John T. Joyce (1894–1930), Illinois State Senate
- Patrick Joyce (politician) (fl. 2010s–present)
