= Thomas A. Dunn =

American politician (born 1942)

Member of the Illinois Senate for the 43rd district 42nd district (1987–1993)
- In office January 1987 – March 14, 1997
- Preceded by: George E. Sangmeister
- Succeeded by: Larry Walsh

Personal details
- Born: October 12, 1942 (age 84) Joliet, Illinois
- Party: Democratic
- Children: Three
- Education: St. Ambrose College (B.A.); DePaul University (J.D.)
- Profession: Attorney

Military service
- Allegiance: United States
- Branch/service: (United States Marine Corps) Marine Corps
- Years of service: 1966–1968
- Rank: Corporal
- Unit: VMO-2
- Battles/wars: Vietnam War
- Awards: Air Medal; Aircrew Badge; Presidential Unit Citation

Thomas A. Dunn (born October 12, 1942) is a member of the Illinois Gaming Board. Prior to this, he served as a Democratic member of the Illinois Senate and an associate judge in the Will County court system.

== Biography ==
Dunn was born October 12, 1942, to Francis and Helen Dunn in Joliet, Illinois. He graduated from Joliet Catholic High School and was a two ALL AMERICAN in shooting selected by Field and Stream magazine.

sand went to work as a truck driver while attending St. Ambrose College. He graduated from St. Ambrose in 1964. In 1966, he joined the United States Marine Corps where he flew over 200 missions as a helicopter machine gunner during the Vietnam War. During his two-year military career, he was awarded four Air Medals, Permanent Air Combat Wings, and a Presidential Unit Citation. He graduated from DePaul University College of Law in 1971. During his legal career he worked in the office of the Cook County Public Defender and as a partner in the Joliet law firm of Dunn, Martin and Miller.

He served for a time as a member of the Illinois Democratic Central Committee. In 1986, he was elected to the Illinois Senate to succeed George E. Sangmeister in the 42nd district. The 42nd included the Joliet, New Lenox, Frankfort, and Lockport townships in Will County.

In the 1991 Republican controlled decennial redistricting process, Dunn was drawn into the 43rd district with fellow Democratic incumbent Jerome J. Joyce. The new 43rd included portions of Will, Kankakee and Iroquois counties. Jerome Joyce opted to retire early. Neither he or his successor and wife Janet J. Joyce opted to challenge Dunn for the Democratic nomination. In the general election, Dunn faced Democrat-turned-Republican Charles Pangle of Bradley.

During his time in the Senate, Dunn was the chief advocate to bring riverboat gambling to help his district. This came to fruition with the opening of Harrah's Joliet in 1993.as of 2026 three quarters of a billion dollars had been received as a result of his bill to the city of Joliet. He voted against the proposed Lake Calumet Airport in Hegewisch, Chicago and opposed repurposing the Joliet Arsenal for similar airport use. He served as a member of the Illinois Task Force on Crime and Corrections. Governor Jim Edgar charged the task force with the responsibilities to study future space needs, including costs, for correctional facilities; consider cost-effective alternatives to imprisonment; analyze current policies, statutes and sentencing procedures that affect inmate population; and identify solutions that protect both taxpayers' safety and their pocketbooks.

In 1997, he resigned upon his appointment to a judgeship. He was succeeded by Will County Democratic Party Chairman Larry Walsh of Elwood. In 2000, Dunn ran for the Democratic nomination for a judgeship on the Illinois Appellate Court. He lost the primary to Mary McDade, who would go on to win the general election. He stepped down from the bench in 2005. In 2015, he was appointed by Governor Bruce Rauner to the Illinois Gaming Board.
