= 2012 Will County Executive election =

- November 6, 2012

Nominee	Larry Walsh	Cory Singer
Party	Democratic	Republican
Popular vote	141,037	118,719
Percentage	54.30%	45.70%
County Executive before election
Larry Walsh
Democratic
Elected County Executive
Larry Walsh
Democratic

The 2012 Will County Executive election was held on November 6, 2012. Incumbent Democratic County Executive Larry Walsh ran for re-election to a third term. He was challenged in the Democratic primary by Leonard Thompson, a former state Department of Corrections employee, and won renomination with 68 percent of the vote. In the general election, Walsh was challenged by Republican Cory Singer, the President of the Will County Forest Preserve District.

Walsh campaigned on his record in attracting economic development to the county, pointing to G&W Electric's relocation to Bolingbrook. Singer attacked Walsh for failing to advocate for the county during the 2011 congressional districting, and for a lack of progress in establishing county autonomy over any airport constructed in Peotone. Walsh ultimately defeated Singer to win re-election with 54 percent of the vote.

== Democratic primary ==
=== Candidates ===
- Larry Walsh, incumbent County Executive
- Leonard Thompson, former Illinois Department of Corrections employee

=== Primary results ===
Democratic primary results
Party	Candidate	Votes	%
Democratic	Larry Walsh (inc.)	14,068	68.27%
Democratic	Leonard Thompson	6,539	31.73%
Total votes		20,607	100.00%

== Republican primary ==
=== Candidates ===
- Cory Singer, President of the Will County Forest Preserve District

=== Primary results ===
Republican primary results
Party	Candidate	Votes	%
Republican	Cory Singer	42,321	100.00%
Total votes		42,321	100.00%

== General election ==
=== Results ===
2012 Will County Executive election
Party	Candidate	Votes	%
Democratic	Larry Walsh (inc.)	141,037	54.30%
Republican	Cory Singer	118,719	45.70%
Total votes		259,756	100.00%
Democratic hold			
