= WAXO =

- Lewisburg, Tennessee; United States
- Frequency: 1220 kHz/95.9 MHz
- Branding: 95.9 WAXO

Programming
- Format: Defunct, License expired (WAXO); Defunct, License cancelled (W240CC)
- Affiliations: Westwood One

Ownership
- Owner: Susan R. Limor, Trustee, Marshall County Radio Corporation

History
- First air date: September 1, 1980
- Last air date: March 17, 2016
- Call sign meaning: Chosen because it could be said as a word

Technical information
- Facility ID: 40456
- Class: D
- ERP: 1,000 watts day 144 watts night
- Transmitter coordinates: 35°25′42.00″N 86°46′22.00″W

WAXO (1220 AM/95.9 FM) was a radio station formerly broadcasting a country music and classic rock format. Licensed to Lewisburg, Tennessee, United States, the station, prior to its bankruptcy, was owned and operated by Marshall County Radio Corporation and featured programming from Westwood One. It also operated a low-power television station on digital channel 29 (formerly seen on analog channel 34).

WAXO went on the air September 1, 1980. The WAXO call letters were previously used by the present-day WWDV in Zion, Illinois, when it was located in Kenosha, Wisconsin.

WAXO radio and television carried a wide selection of local sports including Marshall County sports, Forrest High School sports, and Cornersville High School sports. The station is also an affiliate of the Tennessee Titans radio network.

In March, 2016 WAXO (AM), FM translator W240CC and WAXO (TV) went off the air due to owners, Marshall County Radio Corporation, filing for Chapter 11 bankruptcy, as there were no funds to continue operations of the stations. Special temporary authority had been granted by the Federal Communications Commission to keep WAXO (AM) silent for up to one year. After having been off the air for more than one year, WAXO (AM)'s license expired on March 25, 2017. The license of the 95.9 MHz translator W240CC was cancelled on June 7, 2017, for the same reason.

== Former television sister station ==
See main article: WFET-LD
