= Senator McBroom =

Senator McBroom may refer to:

- Ed McBroom (born 1981), Michigan State Senate
- Edward McBroom (1925–1990), Illinois State Senate
