= WNIZ =

WNIZ may refer to:

- WNIZ-LP, a defunct low-power radio station (100.1 FM) formerly licensed to serve Marietta, Georgia, United States
- WWDV, a radio station (96.9 FM) licensed to serve Zion, Illinois, United States, which held the call sign WNIZ-FM from 1983 to 2001
