= WCLM =

WCLM may refer to:

- WCLM (Chicago)
- WCLM-LP, a defunct low-power radio station in Woodstock, Virginia
- WULT or WCLM from 1988 to 2017, an AM radio station in Highland Springs, Virginia
- WACA (AM), a radio station in Laurel, Maryland which held the call sign WCLM from 2018 to 2021
