= WNIB =

WNIB may refer to:

- WNIB-LD, a low-power digital television station (channel 11, virtual 42) licensed to Rochester, New York, United States
- WNIB (defunct), a former classical music station on 97.1 MHz in the Chicago area from 1955-2001 (now WDRV)
