= 2008 Will County Executive election =

- November 4, 2008

Nominee	Larry Walsh	Dan S. Kennison
Party	Democratic	Republican
Popular vote	155,282	104,611
Percentage	59.75%	40.25%
County Executive before election
Larry Walsh
Democratic
Elected County Executive
Larry Walsh
Democratic

The 2008 Will County Executive election was held on November 4, 2008. Incumbent Democratic County Executive Larry Walsh ran for re-election to a second term. He was challenged by Republican Dan S. Kennison, a businessman who ran a medical supply company.

During the campaign, Walsh was arrested for driving under the influence, and "sincerely apologize[d]" to county residents "for this incident," but said that he would "absolutely not" end his campaign for re-election. In the final days of the campaign, news broke that the FBI had met with County Auditor Stephen Weber, a Republican, over an alleged investigation into Walsh's office, which he called "a fabrication coming from a political campaign trying to smear my reputation and my staff[.]"

Walsh ultimately won re-election in a landslide, defeating Kennison with 60 percent of the vote.

== Democratic primary ==
=== Candidates ===
- Larry Walsh, incumbent County Executive

=== Primary results ===
Democratic primary results
Party	Candidate	Votes	%
Democratic	Larry Walsh (inc.)	70,297	100.00%
Total votes		70,297	100.00%

== Republican primary ==
=== Candidates ===
- Dan S. Kennison, businessman

=== Primary results ===
Republican primary results
Party	Candidate	Votes	%
Republican	Dan S. Kennison	40,394	100.00%
Total votes		40,394	100.00%

== General election ==
=== Results ===
2008 Will County Executive election
Party	Candidate	Votes	%
Democratic	Larry Walsh (inc.)	155,282	59.75%
Republican	Dan S. Kennison	104,611	40.25%
Total votes		259,893	100.00%
Democratic hold			
