= WTNX =

WTNX may refer to:

- WTNX-LD, a low-power television station (channel 15, virtual 29) licensed to serve Nashville, Tennessee, United States
- WLFM (FM), a radio station (103.9 FM) licensed to serve Lawrenceburg, Tennessee, which held the call sign WTNX from 2016 to 2018
- WWDV, a radio station (96.9 FM) licensed to serve Zion, Illinois, United States, which held the call sign WTNX from 2001 to 2003
- WAKZ, a radio station (95.9 FM) licensed to serve Sharpsville, Pennsylvania, United States, which held the call sign WTNX from 1998 to 2001
