= 2016 Will County Executive election =

- November 8, 2016

Nominee	Larry Walsh	Laurie McPhillips
Party	Democratic	Republican
Popular vote	153,735	134,059
Percentage	53.42%	46.58%
County Executive before election
Larry Walsh
Democratic
Elected County Executive
Larry Walsh
Democratic

The 2016 Will County Executive election was held on November 8, 2016. Incumbent Democratic County Executive Larry Walsh ran for re-election to a fourth term. He was challenged by Republican Laurie McPhillips, the former County Register of Deeds. Walsh ultimately won re-election, defeating McPhillips with 53 percent of the vote.

== Democratic primary ==
=== Candidates ===
- Larry Walsh, incumbent County Executive

=== Primary results ===
Democratic primary results
Party	Candidate	Votes	%
Democratic	Larry Walsh (inc.)	64,258	100.00%
Total votes		64,258	100.00%

== Republican primary ==
=== Candidates ===
- Laurie McPhillips, former County Register of Deeds, former County Board Member

=== Primary results ===
Republican primary results
Party	Candidate	Votes	%
Republican	Laurie McPhillips	65,788	100.00%
Total votes		65,788	100.00%

== General election ==
=== Results ===
2016 Will County Executive election
Party	Candidate	Votes	%
Democratic	Larry Walsh (inc.)	153,735	53.42%
Republican	Laurie McPhillips	134,059	46.58%
Total votes		287,794	100.00%
Democratic hold			
