= 2004 Will County Executive election =

- November 2, 2004

Nominee	Larry Walsh	Joseph Mikan
Party	Democratic	Republican
Popular vote	115,715	112,756
Percentage	50.65%	49.35%
County Executive before election
Joseph Mikan
Republican
Elected County Executive
Larry Walsh
Democratic

The 2004 Will County Executive election was held on November 2, 2004. Incumbent Republican County Executive Joseph Mikan ran for re-election to a second term. He was challenged by State Senator Larry Walsh, the Democratic nominee. Despite Republican President George W. Bush's win in the county in the presidential election, Walsh narrowly defeated Mikan, 51–49 percent, to win the election.

== Democratic primary ==
=== Candidates ===
- Larry Walsh, State Senator

=== Primary results ===
Democratic primary results
Party	Candidate	Votes	%
Democratic	Larry Walsh	32,358	99.46%
Democratic	Write-ins	175	0.54%
Total votes		32,533	100.00%

== Republican primary ==
=== Candidates ===
- Joseph Mikan, incumbent County Executive

=== Primary results ===
Republican primary results
Party	Candidate	Votes	%
Republican	Joseph Mikan (inc.)	31,520	99.71%
Republican	Write-ins	92	0.29%
Total votes		31,612	100.00%

== General election ==
=== Results ===
2004 Will County Executive election
Party	Candidate	Votes	%
Democratic	Larry Walsh	115,715	50.65%
Republican	Joseph Mikan (inc.)	112,756	49.35%
Total votes		228,471	100.00%
Democratic gain from Republican			
