= Bult Field =

Coordinates: 41°22′39″N 087°40′47″W

- IATA: none; ICAO: none; FAA LID: C56

Summary
- Owner: Illinois Department of Transportation
- Location: Monee, Illinois
- Time zone: UTC−06:00 (-6)
  - Summer (DST): UTC−05:00 (-5)
- Elevation AMSL: 790 ft / 241 m
- Website: https://www.bultfield.com/
- Interactive map of Bult Field

Runways
Direction	Length		Surface
Direction	ft	m	Surface
9/27	5,000	1,524	Asphalt

Statistics (2018)
- Aircraft Movements: 13,140

Bult Field (FAA LID: C56) is a civil public-use airport located 3 miles southeast of Monee, Illinois. The airport is publicly owned by the Illinois Department of Transportation.

== History ==
Bult Field was founded in 1942 as a grass strip. Flight instruction, maintenance, and hangars were available at the airport.

The airport was purchased by Jim Bult in 2004. Numerous updates were performed, including the construction of a $5 million terminal building. The runway was also paved, along with the adjoining taxiway.

In 2014, the Illinois Department of Transportation bought the airport and surrounding land in order to develop a new airport on the site.

== Proposed replacement ==
Bult Field is near the site of a new proposed Chicago South Suburban Airport. Intended to supplement traffic already into Chicago's O'Hare and Midway International Airports, the South Suburban Airport would serve Chicago's southern suburbs and parts of northwest Indiana with commercial service.

In addition to the airport and its hangars, the Illinois Department of Transportation bought farmland around the airport for a total of 288 acres purchased. Illinois intends to continue operating Bult field as the South Suburban Airport is planned and built, and Bult will continue to serve general and business aviation as commercial traffic begins at the new airport.

As of July 2022, a master plan for the South Suburban Airport is still in the works.

== Facilities and aircraft ==
The airport has one runway. Runway 9/27 measures 5001 × 75 ft (1524 × 23 m) and is concrete. The airport runs its own fixed-base operator and offers, among other services, fuel and courtesy and rental cars. Over 100 hangars are available for locally based aircraft.

For the 12-month period ending July 31, 2018, the airport averages 36 aircraft operations per day, or roughly 13,140 per year, consisting of 99% general aviation and <1% air taxi. For that same time period, there are 66 aircraft based on the airfield: 59 single-engine and 3 multi-engine airplanes, 2 gliders, 1 jet, and 1 helicopter.

Bult Field is home to Chapter 260 of the Experimental Aircraft Association, providing facilities for the chapter's monthly meetings and aviation opportunities for youth, including free flights for kids through the EAA's Young Eagles program.

== Accidents and incidents ==
- On June 8, 2020, a plane crashed after takeoff from Bult Field. Witnesses believe the aircraft may have been experiencing engine trouble. The sole pilot onboard was killed.
- On March 5, 2022, a Piper PA-28 Cherokee landed in a field west of Bult Field after departing the airport.

== See also ==
- List of airports in Illinois
