= William Schyman =

American basketball player

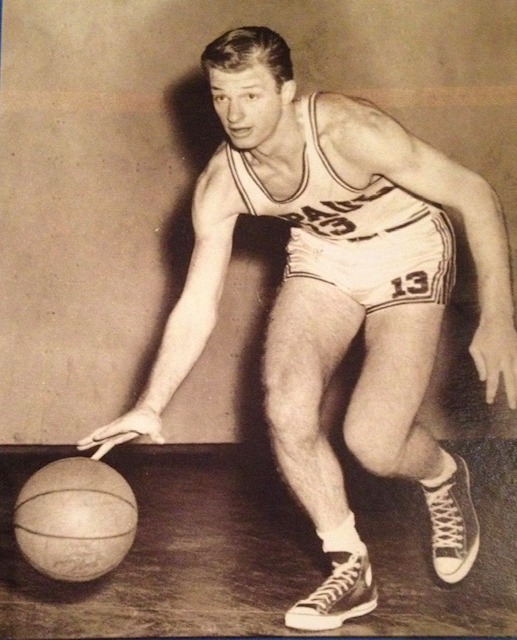
- William, DePaul, 1950–1953

Personal information
- Born: February 14, 1930 Chicago, Illinois, U.S.
- Died: July 2, 2022 (aged 92) Stroudsburg, Pennsylvania, U.S.
- Listed height: 6 ft 7 in (2.01 m)
- Listed weight: 200 lb (91 kg)

Career information
- High school: Lane Tech (Chicago, Illinois)
- College: DePaul (1950–1953)
- NBA draft: 1953: 5th round, 35th overall pick
- Drafted by: Baltimore Bullets
- Position: Forward
- Stats at Basketball Reference

William "Bill" Schyman Jr. (February 14, 1930 – July 2, 2022) was an American basketball player. He is most widely known for being the first deaf player drafted in the NBA being picked by the Baltimore Bullets from the DePaul Blue Demons in the 1953 NBA draft. He was additionally a player for the Philadelphia Sphas and the Washington Generals. He was the head coach of the men's basketball team at Gallaudet University (formally Gallaudet College) from 1962 to 1968.

== Basketball career ==
=== High School and Collegiate ===
William would graduate from Albert Grannis Lane Technical High School with the Chicago scholastic scoring title his senior year. Achieving a scoring average of 27.9 points a game. In 1950 he began his collegiate career under head coach and DePaul University legend Ray Meyer. A starter for the three years he attended, overcoming both an increase of hearing loss as well as near-sightedness, William averaged 11.5 points per game as a junior followed by an average of 10.6 during his senior season. He would witness 51 victories as a Blue Demon and one NCAA tournament in 1953. William would score a career high of 17 points against Indiana where DePaul would fall during the regional semifinals on March 13. The same team would go on to win the national championship. William majored in psychology as an undergraduate. He would be inducted into the DePaul Hall of Fame in 2006.

=== Professional ===
Despite attending hearing-schools in his youth, William was largely deaf come the 1953 NBA draft. He was ultimately picked during the 5th round, 35th overall by the Baltimore Bullets, making him the first deaf player drafted by the association. Despite being drafted and witnessing the Bullets' final full season, William would not see any playing time and the NBA would not see a legally deaf player in-game until Lance Allred in 2008. However, recognized for his success at the collegiate level and for being a proud Jewish American, William was chosen as a player for the U.S. men's basketball team at the 1953 Maccabiah Games in Tel Aviv, Israel. He would play alongside his first cousin and fellow Chicago native Harvery Babetch of Bradley. The U.S. team would go on to win the gold medal. For the next three years William would play sparingly for multiple exhibition teams. This would include the Philadelphia Sphas that soon evolved into the Washington Generals, an "opposition" team of the Harlem Globetrotters. Finally, William would return to Chicago and play for the Chicago Club of the Deaf basketball team in the late 50's.

=== Coaching ===
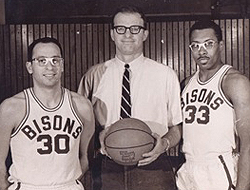
William's final season as head coach, beside Bison team captains 1967–68.

Starting the 1962–63 NCAA College Division season William became the head coach for the Gallaudet Bison men's basketball team. That same season he led the team to an 11–9 record. The first winning season for the program in 44 years. He would finish his tenure in 1968 with a 36–96 record. In 1965 in Washington, D.C. and again in 1981 in Cologne, West Germany, William would lead the American Deaflympics men's basketball teams to gold medals. It was during this period that he was inducted into the USA Deaf Basketball Hall of Fame in 1978. After marrying his wife Helen and moving to Beltsville, Maryland, William would work as a physical education teacher in Prince George's County Public Schools.

Record table
Season	Team	Overall	Conference	Standing	Postseason
Gallaudet Bison (Mason–Dixon Conference) (1962–1968)
1962–63	Gallaudet	11–9			
1963–64	Gallaudet				
1964–65	Gallaudet				
1965–66	Gallaudet				
1966–67	Gallaudet				
1967–68	Gallaudet				
Total:		36–96			

== Personal life ==
Following his professional playing career, William would earn a master's degree in education at American University in Washington, D.C., later working for IBM. While playing for the Chicago Club of the Deaf basketball team William would meet and marry his wife Helen in the early 60's. Helen having previously worked at the Pennsylvania School for the Deaf. They would have three children. In 1965 they would purchase a plot of land in the Pocono Mountains where they would establish Pine Lake Summer Camp that operated for 25 years. William would die peacefully at his home in Pennsylvania on July 2, 2022.
