= Lane Tech College Prep High School =

Public secondary magnet school in Chicago, Illinois, US

Albert Grannis Lane Technical College Preparatory High School
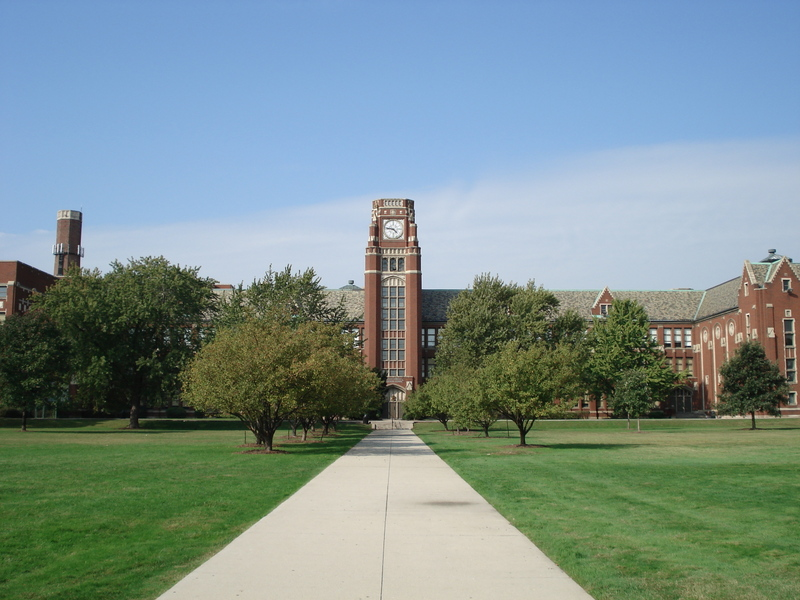
- The clock tower at Lane Tech

Location
- 2501 W. Addison Street; Chicago, Illinois 60618; United States; 41°56′43″N 87°41′27″W

Information
- School type: Public Secondary Magnet
- Motto: Wherever you go, whatever you do, remember the honor of Lane
- Opened: 1908; 118 years ago
- School district: Chicago Public Schools
- CEEB code: 140640
- Principal: Edwina Thompson
- Teaching staff: 277.50 (on an FTE basis)
- Grades: 7th–12th
- Gender: Coed
- Enrollment: 4,604 (2024–2025)
- Student to teacher ratio: 16.59
- Campus size: 33 acres (13 ha)
- Campus type: Urban
- Colors: Myrtle; Old Gold
- Fight song: Go, Lane, Go
- Athletics conference: Chicago Public League
- Nickname: Champions
- Accreditation: AdvancED Higher Learning Commission
- Newspaper: The Lane Tech Champion
- Yearbook: Golden Years
- Website: www.lanetech.org

Lane Tech College Prep High School (often shortened to Lane Tech, full name Albert Grannis Lane Technical College Preparatory High School), is a public four-year selective enrollment magnet high school located in the Roscoe Village neighborhood on the north side of Chicago, Illinois, United States. It is a part of the Chicago Public Schools district. Lane is one of the oldest schools in the city and has an enrollment of over four thousand students, making it the largest high school in the state. Lane is a selective-enrollment-based school in which students must take a test and pass a certain benchmark in order to be offered admission. Lane is one of eleven selective enrollment schools in Chicago. It is a diverse school with many of its students coming from different ethnicities and economic backgrounds. In 2019, Lane Tech was rated the 3rd best public high school in Illinois and 69th in the nation.

== School history ==
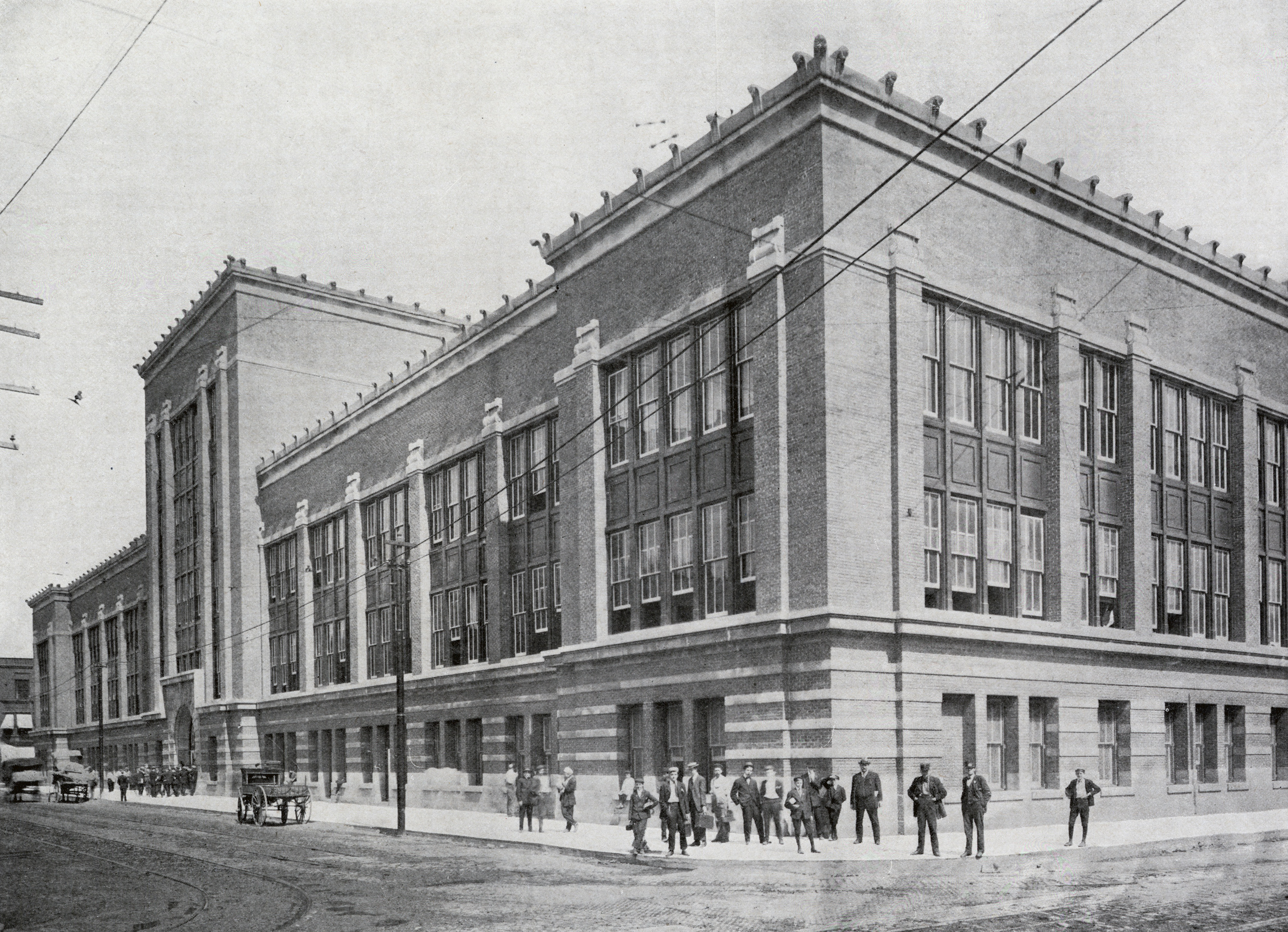
Original school designed by Dwight H. Perkins, in use from 1908 to 1934.

=== Founding ===
The school is named after Albert G. Lane, a former principal and superintendent of Chicago Public Schools from 1891 until 1898. It was founded in 1908 and dedicated on Washington's Birthday in 1909, as the Albert Grannis Lane Manual Training High School. This building, designed by Board of Education Architect Dwight H. Perkins, stood at Sedgwick Avenue and Division Street. During the early years of the school's operation, the school was a manual training school for boys, where students could take advantage of a wide array of technical classes. Freshmen were offered carpentry, cabinet making, and wood turning. Sophomores received training in foundry, forge, welding, coremaking, and molding. Juniors could take classes in the machine shop. Seniors were able to take electric shop which was the most advanced shop course. By the 1970s freshman were assigned to wood and electric shop for a semester each. Sophomores were forced into welding and foundry although few college bound students gained any value. Politically connected parents could influence students into auto shop.

By the 1930s, Lane had a student population of over 7,000 boys. Since the school's building was not originally planned for such a huge student population, a new site for the school was chosen, and the building was designed by Board of Education architect John C. Christensen. On its dedication day, September 17, 1934, the student body—over 9,000 boys—and faculty gathered at Wrigley Field and from there walked en masse several miles west to the new campus. (In 1983 and 2008, to celebrate the 75th and 100th anniversaries of the school, a march was held from the school to Wrigley Field.) Lane's huge student body necessitated that classes be held in three shifts. That year (1934), the school name was changed to the Albert Grannis Lane Technical High School to reflect the school's expanding curriculum, but was known to all simply as "Lane Tech." In 2004, the school name was changed to Lane Technical College Prep High School to reflect a college preparatory mandate.

=== Student admission during the Cold War ===
Lane adopted a closed admission policy in 1958 on the school's 50th anniversary. All remedial classes were eliminated and only top tier students were admitted to the school. This coincided with the beginning of the space race between the United States and the USSR. Lane changed its educational policy to help ensure that the United States would not fall behind the Soviets in science and technology.

=== Admission of female students ===
In 1971, changes were made to the admission policy due to a drop in enrollment and lack of technical schools for girls. To solve the issue, Superintendent James Redmond recommended that girls be admitted to Lane Tech. The Chicago Board of Education concurred and girls were admitted as students for the first time. Due to a fear of having a drop in academic achievement, 1,500 male students protested the admission but the decision was not changed.

== Campus ==
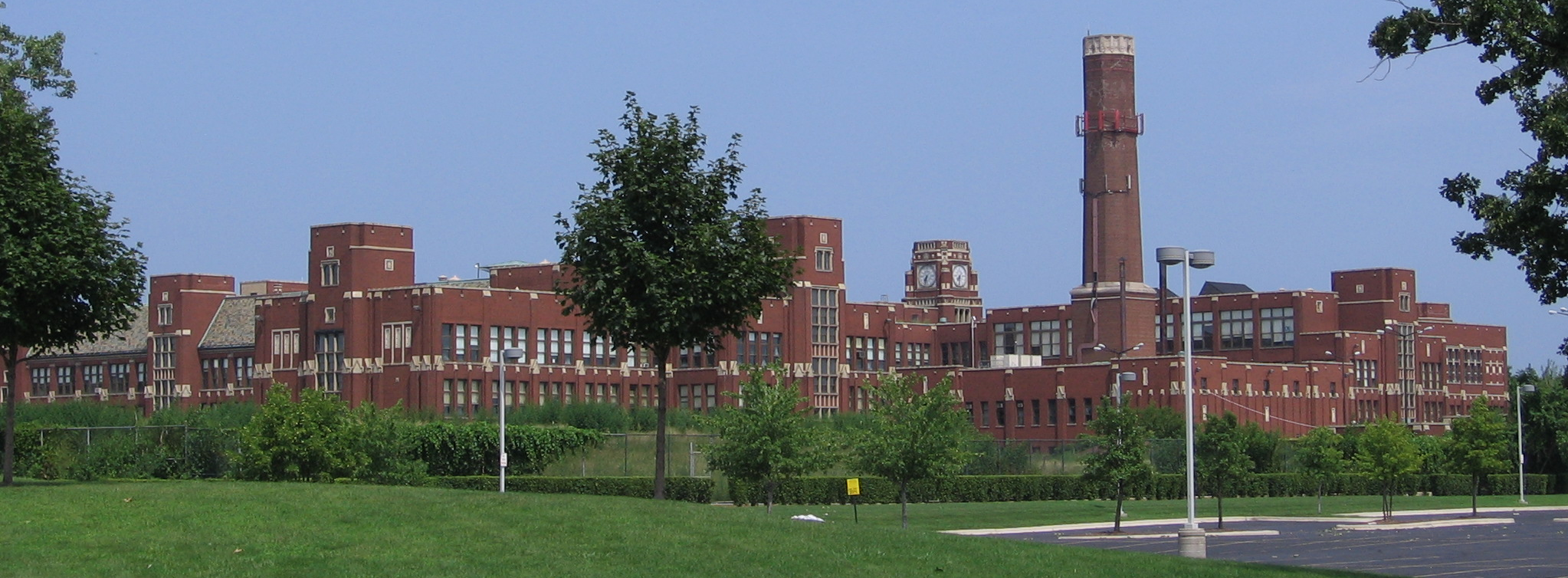
The west and rear of the school. The clock tower is visible to the right of center, and to the left of the taller smokestack.

Lane Tech is located on a 33-acre (13 ha) campus at the intersection of Addison Street and Western Avenue in Chicago, Illinois. The campus includes: the main school building, Lane Stadium, Kerry Wood Cubs Field, a turf soccer field, and the parking lot.

=== Lane Stadium ===
stadium entrance, photographed in 2024

Campus facilities include Lane Stadium, one of seven stadiums operated by Chicago Public Schools, which play host to Chicago Public League sporting events. As of 2022, it was typically site of approximately 1,000 games each year.

=== Memorial Garden ===
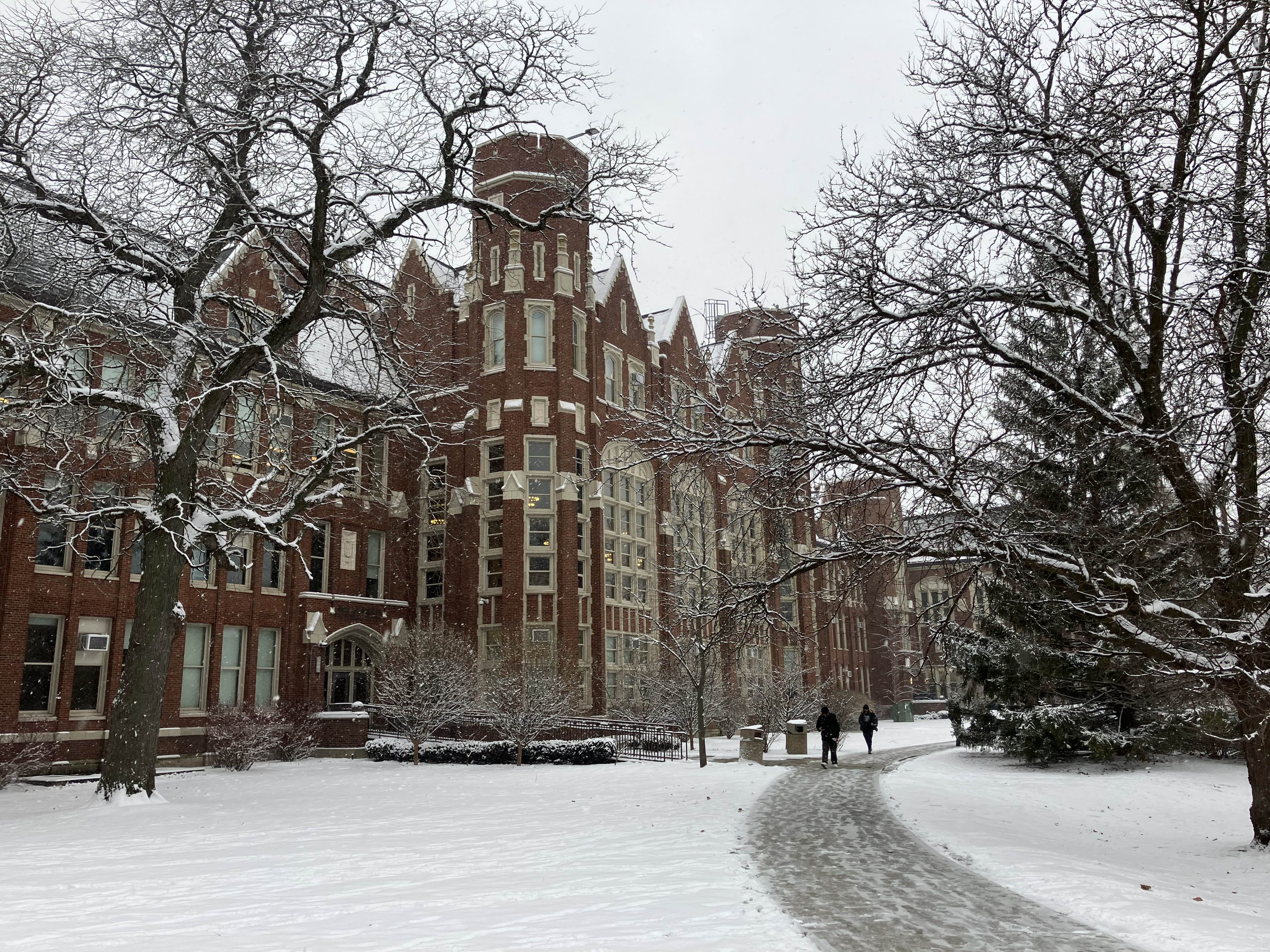
A picture of the side of Lane Tech College Prep facing Chicago's Addison Street.

At the west end of the Memorial Garden is the Ramo I. Zenkich Memorial, consisting of a flag pole and granite monument inscribed with the names of the students from Lane Tech who lost their lives in the Vietnam War. The Memorial Garden was rededicated in 1995. During the school's 90th anniversary celebration in 1998, a commemorative plaque was placed near the "Shooting the Stars" statue. It explains the significance of the Memorial Garden to Lane Tech and its students.

== Academics ==
Honor level courses are offered to qualified students. Advanced Placement (AP) courses are available in English, history, math, science, art, music, computer science, and world languages. Students can also replace their normal physical education classes with a class in Junior Reserve Officers' Training Corps (JROTC). The program sponsors the Proctors Club, Color Guard, Honor Guard, Drill Platoon, Drum & Bugle Corps, and Raiders of Lane. As of 2025, Lane has a 96% graduation rate.

As of 2025, 97% of Lane students take at least one AP exam throughout their time at Lane.

Lane offers courses in Aquaponics and is the second Chicago Public School to do so alongside Walter Payton College Prep.

Lane Tech has the most graduates who complete PhD's in the nation as of 2018.

Lane Tech has the biggest computer science program in Chicago Public Schools, and is considered one of the best schools in computer science in the United States.

== Athletics ==
Lane offers many sports including, but not limited to baseball, basketball, bowling, cheerleading, cross-country, football, golf, ice hockey, lacrosse, soccer, softball, swimming, tennis, track, volleyball, wrestling, women's rugby, and water polo. Lane has won 16 state championships since 1908. Numerous Lane Tech athletes have competed beyond the high school level and achieved success at the college level and beyond. Lane Tech also started a girls flag football team, winning city championships in 2024.

In 1934 the NFL-champion Chicago Bears held their practices for the Chicago College All-Star Game at Lane Tech.

== Transportation ==
There are several methods of transportation around the school provided by the Chicago Transit Authority (CTA), including bus routes 49, X49, and 152. CTA Red, Blue, and Brown "L" train lines are also nearby. Lane Tech also provides bike racks for students and faculty who commute by bicycle.

== Notable alumni ==
- Tony Alcantar is an actor and acting teacher.
- Leonard Baldy was a pioneering Chicago police officer and helicopter traffic reporter.
- Franz Benteler was a classical violinist and leader of the Royal Strings Orchestra.
- Edgar Bergen was a ventriloquist, actor, and radio performer, best remembered for creating Charlie McCarthy.
- Rod Blagojevich is a former Governor of Illinois (attended for a short time before transferring).
- Aimee Boorman is a gymnastics coach who was the head coach of the Final Five at the 2016 Summer Olympics. Boorman was the personal coach of Simone Biles.
- Cyron Brown is a former lineman who played in the NFL and AFL.
- Buzz Capra is a former Major League Baseball pitcher (1971–77).
- Phil Cavarretta was a Major League Baseball player (1934–55). He spent most of his playing career with, and briefly managed the Chicago Cubs.
- Ertharin Cousin is the former executive director of the United Nations World Food Programme.
- Len Church was a pitcher for the Chicago Cubs (1966).
- Bill Daily was an actor (I Dream of Jeannie, The Bob Newhart Show).
- Frank Dasso was a Major League Baseball pitcher for the Cincinnati Reds (1945–46).
- Anna Davlantes has been a news anchor at WMAQ-TV and WFLD-TV.
- Otto Denning was a Major League Baseball catcher for the Cleveland Indians (1942–43).
- DJ Colette (Colette Marino) is a house music singer and DJ.
- George J. Efstathiou is an architect at Skidmore, Owings and Merrill (Burj Khalifa, Chicago Symphony Center).
- Dan Evans is a former General Manager of the Los Angeles Dodgers and a baseball executive, Class of 1978.
- John Felske is a former Major League Baseball player and manager.
- Bill Fischer was a lineman for the Chicago Cardinals (1949–53). A member of the College Football Hall of Fame, he won the Outland Trophy in 1948.
- Michael Patrick Flanagan, class of 1980, is a former congressman.
- Allan Friedman is former chairman of neurosurgery at Duke University
- Neal Gabler is an author and political commentator.
- Theaster Gates is an American Social Practice installation artist.
- Carl Giammarese is a singer and guitarist who co-founded The Buckinghams.
- Earl Gillespie was a sports broadcaster for the Milwaukee Braves and Green Bay Packers
- Godfrey is a comedian and actor.
- Fred Goetz, mobster implicated in the Saint Valentine's Day massacre.
- Ron Gora was a swimmer who competed in the 1952 Summer Olympics.
- Stuart Gordon, film and theater director
- Bato Govedarica is a former player for the Syracuse Nationals (1953–54).
- Seymour Greenberg was a national champion tennis player.
- Dwight D. Guilfoil Jr., manufacturing executive, advocate for disabled workers
- Herbert Hans Haupt was a Nazi spy during World War II executed by U.S. Government for his role in Operation Pastorius.
- Dennis Hejhal is a mathematician at the University of Minnesota.
- Robert Irsay (1923–1997), owner of the Indianapolis Colts of the National Football League.
- Maxwell Jenkins (born 2005—), an American film and television actor.
- Arndt Jorgens was a Norwegian-born catcher (1929–39), playing his entire career for the New York Yankees.
- Orville Jorgens was a pitcher for the Philadelphia Phillies (1935–37).
- John T. Joyce, Illinois businessman and state legislator
- John Komlos is a professor of economics at LMU Munich. He helped found the field of anthropometric history.
- Frankie Laine was a singer, songwriter and actor. One source notes that Laine's stage name was taken from the school.
- Ed Linke was a Major League Baseball pitcher (1933–38).
- Naysha Lopez is a Drag queen (Miss Continental 2013)
- Justina Machado is an actress (Six Feet Under, One Day at a Time, Jane the Virgin ).
- Irv Medlinger was a Major League Baseball pitcher for the St. Louis Browns (1949, 51).
- Bus Mertes was a professional football player and college head coach at Bradley, Drake and Kansas State.
- Richard W. Mies is a former U.S. Navy admiral who served as head of the United States Strategic Command.
- Donna Miller, Cook County commissioner
- Ken Nordine is a voiceover and recording artist best known for his series of Word Jazz albums.
- Louis Trinca-Pasat was a football defensive tackle for the St. Louis Rams of the National Football League (NFL).
- Frank Piatek is an artist and professor at the School of the Art Institute of Chicago.
- Rachel Barton Pine is a violinist (Honorary Alumna)
- John Podesta is the former chief of staff to President Bill Clinton.
- Fritz Pollard is a member of the College Football Hall of Fame and Pro Football Hall of Fame. He was the first African-American to be a head coach in the NFL.
- Corey Postiglione is an artist and Professor Emeritus of Columbia College Chicago.
- Marty Robinson was an Emmy and Peabody Award-winning voice-over announcer at WTTW.
- Richard Schroeppel is a mathematician.
- William Schyman former basketball player for the DePaul Blue Demons, first deaf player drafted in the NBA.
- Nadine Barrie Smith was a medical researcher.
- Joey Soloway is a 2014 Golden Globe award-winning producer and writer, known for Transparent (2014), Six Feet Under (2001) and Afternoon Delight (2013).
- Dave Spector is a television personality in Japan.
- Jim Suchecki is a former MLB player (Boston Red Sox, St. Louis Browns, Pittsburgh Pirates).
- Genndy Tartakovsky is an Emmy Award-winning animator (Dexter's Laboratory, Samurai Jack, Star Wars: Clone Wars).
- Laken Tomlinson is a guard for the Seattle Seahawks.
- Towkio is a rapper and producer.
- Dick Triptow is a former NBL and NBA player (1944–49).
- Joe Vodicka was a football player.
- Phil Weintraub was a Major League Baseball player (1933–38, 44–45).
- Johnny Weissmuller was a five-time Olympic gold medal-winning swimmer who later became an actor, best known for his portrayal of Tarzan in the MGM film series 1932–42.
- Warren Winiarski California grape grower, founder and former winemaker of Stag's Leap Wine Cellars
- Steve Wilkos is a talk show host (The Steve Wilkos Show) and former bodyguard (Jerry Springer).
- Bob Weiland is a former MLB player (Chicago White Sox, Boston Red Sox, Cleveland Indians, St. Louis Browns, St. Louis Cardinals).
- Jim Woods is a former MLB player (Chicago Cubs, Philadelphia Phillies).
- Adrian Zmed is an actor (TJ Hooker, Grease 2, Dance Fever).
