= Kankakee Community College =

Public college in Kankakee, Illinois, US

- Type: 2-year
- Established: 1966; 60 years ago
- President: Michael Boyd
- Location: Kankakee, Illinois, United States; 41.0985°N 87.8505°W
- Colors: Red & Blue
- Nickname: Cavaliers
- Sporting affiliations: NJCAA
- Website: https://www.kcc.edu

Kankakee Community College (KCC) is a public community college in Kankakee, Illinois. The main campus is located on the southern border of the city of Kankakee and spans 178 acres (0.72 km^{2}) along the banks of the Kankakee River. KCC is accredited by the Commission on Institutions of Higher Education of the North Central Association of Colleges. The college was founded in 1966. Its president is Michael Boyd.

The college offered its first classes in September 1968. Since that date, it has served as an educational, vocational, and recreational center for residents of Community College District 520, an area encompassing all of Kankakee County and portions of Iroquois, Ford, Grundy, Livingston, and Will counties. The school serves a population of approximately 150,000.

== Leadership ==
=== Presidents ===
#	Name	Term
1	Robert Zimmer	1967–1969
2	John Samlin	1969–1976
3	Lilburn H. Horton Jr.	1977–87
4	Larry Huffman	1987–2001
5	Jerry Weber	2001–2009
6	John Avendano	2009–2019
7	Michael Boyd	2019–present

== Notable alumni ==
- Michael Clarke Duncan (1957–2012), Oscar-nominated actor (Green Mile, Whole Nine Yards, Scorpion King); KCC student and basketball player from 1979 to 1981
- Charles Pangle (1941–2015), Illinois state representative
- Tom Prince, catcher for five Major League Baseball teams
- LaMont "ShowBoat" Robinson (born 1961) Played oversea Denmark (1886–87) USBL (1988) Meadowlark Lemon Harlem-All-Star (1988–1995) Harlem Globetotters and Washington Generals Tour (1989) Harlem Road Kings (1995–2010) Harlem Clowns (2010-Present) KCC student and basketball player (1981–82) Central State Univ (1986) Founder of the Rhythm & Blues Hall of Fame.
