= Marty Robinson (announcer) =

American radio and television announcer

- Born: Martin Robinson; September 7, 1932 (age 92); Chicago, Illinois, U.S.
- Education: Lane Tech High School
- Occupation(s): Former Radio and Television announcer
- Years active: 1956–1998
- Notable credits: Radio Announcer at WEAW-(1956); Radio Announcer at WAAF - (1957); Radio Announcer at WNIB - (1958); Radio Announcer at WFMT - (1959 to 1971); Announcer/Program Host at WTTW - (1971 to 1998)
- Spouse: Mary Wellingham Robinson - (1959 to present)

Marty Robinson (born September 7, 1932) is a retired voice-over announcer for various stations, most notably at WTTW studios.

== Career ==
Robinson started his broadcast career in 1956 at WEAW in Evanston. He later worked at WAAF, WNIB, WAIT, WGN, and WJJD. On leaving WNIB in 1958, Robinson joined WFMT, where he worked as a staff announcer, program host and chief announcer until 1971, when he left to join WTTW-TV. He remained at Channel 11 as an announcer, narrator and program host until 1998. Robinson was also producer and host of The First Fifty Years, a nationally syndicated program of historic vocal records from 1967 to 1992. Robinson was also notably remembered as making "epic introductions" and closing voice-overs of the series Doctor Who for Channel 11.

== Notable work ==
Some of Robinson's credits are listed below.

- Host of the WTTW Golden Apple Awards for Excellence in Teaching since 1986-2003 (5 Emmy Awards)
- Producer/host for 25 years of the nationally syndicated program of historic vocal recordings, The First Fifty Years.
- Narrator of the PBS-BBC series Atlantic Realm.
- Narrator of the PBS-BBC series The Making of a Continent I. (Peabody Award)
- Narrator of the PBS-BBC series The Making of a Continent II. (Ohio State Award, San Francisco Film Festival Award)
- Host of the CBS-Chicago special, Caring for Chicago.
- Narrator of the PBS special Solti at 75. (Emmy Award)
- Host of the WTTW-PBS live special, The Chicago Jazz Festival.
- Host of the Chicago Symphony Orchestra special Bravos from Home.
- Narrator of the PBS special The Treasures of Tutankhamun. (Emmy Award)
- Host/Narrator of the WTTW Special, Top Guns of ‘43. (Emmy Award)
- Host/Narrator of the WTTW Special, Maxwell Street.
- Host of the WTTW Special Henry Ossawa Tanner.
- Narrator of the WTTW special The First Jetliner. (Emmy Award)
- Narrator of the WTTW special The Case Against Garbage.
- Host of the WTTW presentation of Wagner's Ring of the Nibelung.
- Host of the WTTW presentation of Olympica.
- Narrator of the WTTW special Renoir.
- Narrator of the WTTW special Monet. (Emmy Award)
- Narrator of the WTTW special The Chicago Art Institute.
- Narrator of the Grant Park Festival presentation of Carmen.
- Backstage interviewer for WFMT at Lyric Opera of Chicago.
- Lecturer for Lyric Opera of Chicago.
- Host of the WTTW special Lyric Opera at 25.
- Host of the WTTW Chicago Opera Theater special The Mother of Us All.
- Host/narrator in scores of industrial films and commercials.
- Broadcast interviews of hundreds of celebrities, including Victor Borge, Mel Brooks, Jimmy Carter, Richard J. Daley, Lou Holtz, Marilyn Horne, Wynton Marsalis, Ruth Page, Luciano Pavarotti, Itzhak Perlman, Harold Prince, Sir Georg Solti, Bill Veeck, Harold Washington.

== Personal life ==
Robinson was born near Logan Square in Chicago, Illinois. He first attended Darwin Grammar School and later attended Lane Tech High School and graduated in 1950. After High School, Robinson enlisted in the Navy when the Korean War began and served for three-and-a-half years. Before breaking into broadcasting in 1956, he worked as a gas station attendant, a stable boy, a file clerk, a counterman, a truck driver, a laborer, a cowboy, a bartender, and a cab driver. He has been married to Mary Robinson (née Wellingham) since 1959 and they have lived in Prospect Heights, Illinois since 1973. The Robinsons have two children and two grandchildren.
