= John Avendano =

American academic administrator

6th President of Florida State College at Jacksonville
- Incumbent
- Assumed office July 1, 2019
- Preceded by: Cynthia Bioteau

6th President of Kankakee Community College
- In office July 1, 2009 – June 30, 2019
- Succeeded by: Michael Boyd

Personal details
- Born: Aurora, Illinois, U.S.
- Education: Waubonsee Community College (AA); Northern Illinois University (BS, MA); Illinois State University (PhD)

Academic background
- Thesis: Student involvement: Assessing student satisfaction, gains, and quality of effort (2003)

Academic work
- Discipline: Educational Administration
- Institutions: Illinois State University

John Avendano is an American academic administrator who is currently serving as the sixth president of Florida State College at Jacksonville, beginning in 2019. Avendano previously served as the president and CEO of Kankakee Community College in Illinois and held leadership positions within educational and community organizations.

== Early life and education ==
Avendano was born in Aurora, Illinois. He received his associate degree from Waubonsee Community College, his bachelor's degree in exercise physiology and master's degree in adult continuing education from Northern Illinois University, and his doctorate in educational administration and foundations from Illinois State University.

== Career ==
Avendano began his career in community college administration at Kankakee Community College in Illinois. He held various administrative roles before being appointed as the president and CEO in 2009.

Avendano previously served as the president of the Illinois Council of Public Community College Presidents and as the chair of the South Metropolitan Higher Education Consortium President's Council in Illinois.

Avendano was a board member and chair for the Economic Alliance of Kankakee County, the Grundy-Livingston-Kankakee Workforce Investment Board, Cornerstone Services, and the Riverside Medical Center Board. He also co-chaired United Way of Kankakee County in 2014–15. Additionally, Avendano was the presidents' liaison for the Illinois region of Phi Theta Kappa (PTK).

In 2019, he became president and CEO of Florida State College at Jacksonville.

== Personal life ==
He is married to Janet Avendano and has three children.
