= WTBC-FM =

Radio station in Chicago, Illinois

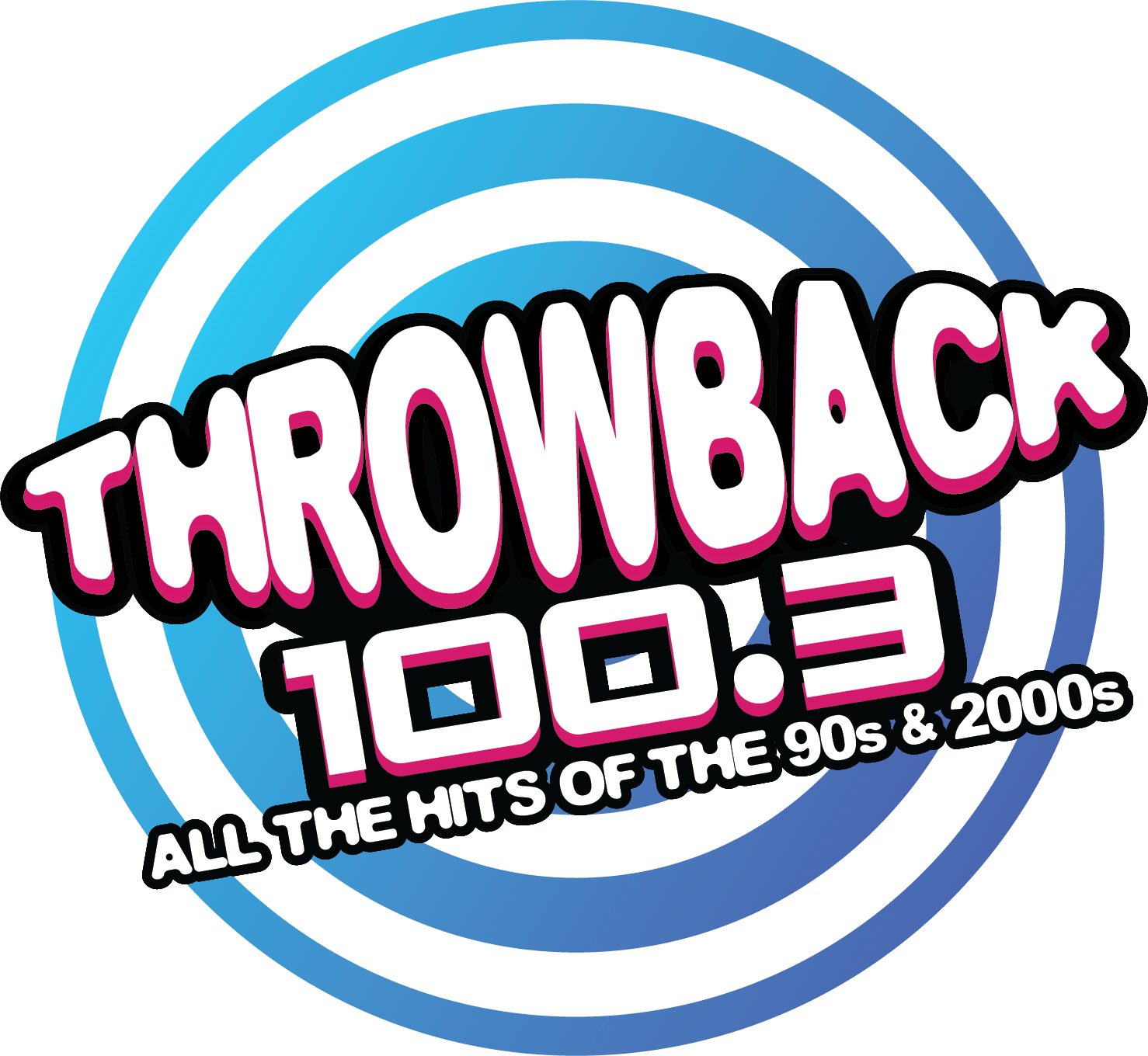
- Chicago, Illinois; United States
- Broadcast area: Chicago metropolitan area; Northwest Indiana
- Frequency: 100.3 MHz (HD Radio)
- Branding: Throwback 100.3

Programming
- Format: Rhythmic adult hits
- Subchannels: HD2: WMVP (1000 AM) simulcast (ESPN Radio/sports radio, via agreement with Good Karma Brands)
- Affiliations: Premiere Networks

Ownership
- Owner: Hubbard Broadcasting; (Chicago FCC License Sub, LLC)
- Sister stations: WDRV; WWDV; WTMX

History
- First air date: 1948 (as WFMF)
- Former call signs: WFMF (1948–1974) WLOO (1974–1988); WXEZ-FM (1988–1990); WPNT-FM (1990–1997); WNND (1997–2004); WILV (2004–2015); WSHE-FM (2015–2024)
- Call sign meaning: Throwback Chicago

Technical information
- Licensing authority: FCC
- Facility ID: 10059
- Class: B
- ERP: 5,700 watts
- HAAT: 425 meters (1,394 ft)
- Transmitter coordinates: 41°53′56.1″N 87°37′23.2″W

Links
- Public license information: Public file; LMS
- Webcast: Listen live
- Website: www.throwbackchicago.com

WTBC-FM (100.3 MHz) is a radio station licensed to Chicago, Illinois, with a rhythmic adult hits format, focusing on music from 1990 to 2015. The station is owned by Hubbard Broadcasting, Its studios are located at One Prudential Plaza, with transmitter facilities atop the John Hancock Center downtown.

The station has had multiple owners since coming on the air in 1948, but has usually carried lighter music depending on industry trends, never veering too far towards any type of hard rock or rap format and specifically programmed to appeal to office listeners, and since 1997, additionally has been structured playlist-wise to avoid any competition with its higher-rated sister station WTMX.

== History ==
=== Beautiful music era ===
The station began broadcasting in 1948 as WFMF, owned by Field Enterprises. WFMF aired a beautiful music format, and its programming was used for over the air background music in stores, including Field's own department stores. The station's studios and transmitter were originally located at the Carbide & Carbon Building. In 1957, WFMF was sold to Maurice, Lois, Jerome, and Lucille Rosenfield, for $125,000.

By the mid-1950s, it had the fifth most listeners of any Chicago station during evening hours. In 1955, the FCC attempted to force stations airing "functional music" to confine such programming to subcarriers. WFMF's owners successfully challenged this FCC rule in court, with the station's large listenership among the general public being cited by the United States Court of Appeals in their 1958 ruling. In 1959, WFMF became the first beautiful music FM station to be listed in a Hooper Ratings book.

In 1966, the station was sold to Century Broadcasting for $450,000. In 1970, its transmitter was moved to the John Hancock Center, while its studios were moved there the following year.

In May 1974, the station's call sign were changed to WLOO, with the "L" often written in lower case to resemble a "1" to reflect its "FM-100" branding. The station continued to air a beautiful music format; mostly instrumental renditions of pop songs along with some soft vocalists. In the late 1970s, it was the second most listened to station in Chicago. During this time, a version of its format known as the "FM 100 Plan" was syndicated by Darrell Peters to over 100 other stations across the country.

Through the 1980s, WLOO continued airing an easy listening format, albeit with more vocals by adult contemporary artists and fewer by standards artists.

=== WXEZ-FM ===
In 1988, the call sign changed to WXEZ-FM, standing for "Extra Easy". The station evolved to a soft adult contemporary format, playing more vocals and fewer instrumentals. The station was simulcast on WXEZ AM 820. Its owner, Century Broadcasting, lost an age discrimination suit that was filed by announcers who they had fired and replaced with younger announcers when the station became WXEZ.

=== WPNT-FM ===
On November 16, 1990, the station's call sign were changed to WPNT-FM, branded as "100.3 The Point", and it began airing a hot adult contemporary format, playing hits of the 1980s and current product. The station was initially simulcast on 820 AM (which itself took the WPNT calls), but in early January 1991, its AM sister was taken off the air while its owner sold off that station and its transmitter site was re-located.

In 1994, Steve Cochran began hosting morning drive. In 1996, Fred Winston replaced Cochran as morning host.

In spring 1997, WPNT was sold to Evergreen Media for $73 million in a transaction brokered by Bob Heymann and Jack Minkow. At this time, the station was branded "Chicago's 100.3" with the slogan "The Radio Station That Picks You Up & Makes You Feel Good", airing a hot AC format, including 1980s and 1990s hits, along with currents.

When Evergreen acquired WPNT, Chancellor and Evergreen were in the process of completing their merger. The newly formed Chancellor would own too many stations in the Chicago market per FCC ownership limits. As a result, WLUP and WPNT were sold to Bonneville International, which already owned hot AC station WTMX.

=== WNND-FM ===
As WPNT would provide in-house competition to the higher-rated WTMX, on October 6, 1997, WPNT adopted a differentiating adult contemporary format of its own as "Windy 100". That month, the station's call letters were changed to WNND to match the new moniker. The first song on "Windy" was "Forever Young" by Rod Stewart. On December 10, 2002, the station rebranded as "100.3 WNND" and shifted to an 80s/90s hits format. WNND also carried the nighttime request and dedication show "Love Notes", hosted by John Symons.

=== WILV ===
On November 5, 2004, at 7 a.m., the station adopted a rhythmic AC/rhythmic oldies format as "100.3 Love FM", and its call sign was changed to WILV. In 2006, Tommy Edwards joined "Love FM" as afternoon host, moving to mornings in 2007. Edwards would later host weekends before leaving for 104.3 WJMK in 2011.

In 2008, the station again became known as "Chicago's 100.3" and it aired an adult contemporary format.

On June 7, 2010, at 1 p.m., WILV became "Rewind 100.3", airing a 1980s based classic hits format, along with some music from 1970s and 1990s.

Bonneville announced the sale of WILV, as well as 16 other stations, to Hubbard Broadcasting on January 19, 2011. The sale was completed on April 29, 2011.

On December 1, 2013, WILV rebranded back to the "Chicago's 100.3" moniker.

=== WSHE-FM ===
On March 2, 2015, the station rebranded as "SHE 100.3", and changed their call sign from WILV to WSHE-FM, retaining the same fulltime air staff. By coincidence, Hubbard also holds the same set of calls on the other side of the Mississippi River for KSHE, a heritage classic rock station in St. Louis.

In May 2021, WSHE shifted its format from adult contemporary to adult hits, dropping currents and recurrents from their playlist.

On July 29, 2022, at 10 a.m., WSHE shifted its adult hits format to emphasize 90's and 2000s music, branded as "The NEW 100.3...SHE Loves the 90s and 2000s".

=== WTBC-FM ===
On May 2, 2024, WSHE-FM rebranded as "Throwback 100.3". With the change, the station added some early 2010s music to the playlist; the station otherwise remains unchanged in either pre-2015 playlists and on-air staff. The station's calls were changed to WTBC-FM on June 6 to reflect its slogan, with the WSHE calls warehoused on the former WWFD in the Washington, D.C. area.

The station's current, weekday airstaff included Brooke & Jeffrey (mornings), Randi West (middays), Rick Hall (afternoons) and Ginger Jordan (evenings).
