= WTMX =

Radio station in Skokie, Illinois, United States

Coordinates: 41.879°N 87.636°W

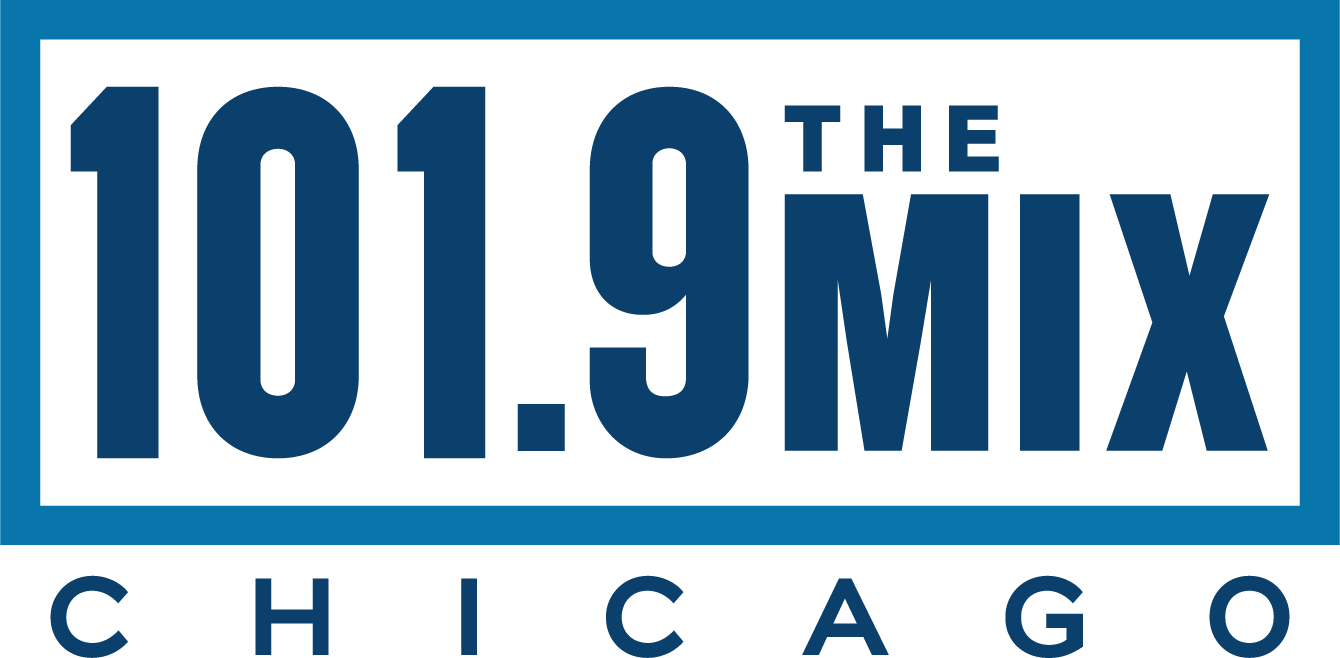
- Skokie, Illinois; United States
- Broadcast area: Chicago, Illinois
- Frequency: 101.9 MHz (HD Radio)
- Branding: ‘’101.9 The Mix’’

Programming
- Format: Hot adult contemporary
- Subchannels: HD2: Classic rock

Ownership
- Owner: Hubbard Broadcasting; (Chicago FCC License Sub, LLC)
- Sister stations: WDRV, WWDV, WTBC-FM

History
- First air date: August 18, 1961 (as WRSV at 98.3)
- Former call signs: WRSV (1961–1970); WCLR (1970-1989)
- Former frequencies: 98.3 MHz (1961–1966)
- Call sign meaning: Station's slogan of The Mix

Technical information
- Licensing authority: FCC
- Facility ID: 6377
- Class: B
- ERP: 4,200 watts
- HAAT: 476 meters (1,562 ft)

Links
- Public license information: Public file; LMS
- Webcast: Listen live
- Website: www.wtmx.com

WTMX (101.9 FM "The Mix") is a hot adult contemporary radio station in Chicago, Illinois. Licensed to Skokie, it is owned by Hubbard Broadcasting. WTMX has its studios located at One Prudential Plaza and its transmitter co-located atop Willis Tower (the former Sears Tower).

WTMX broadcasts in the HD digital hybrid format. The station broadcasts an HD2 subchannel branded "Good Rock".

== History ==
=== WRSV ===
The station began broadcasting August 18, 1961, and held the call sign WRSV, which stood for "Radio Skokie Valley", its owner at the time. Radio Skokie Valley was owned by M. Earlene Stebbins. The station aired a full service format, with a wide variety of local programs along with classical music and standards.

The station originally broadcast at 98.3 MHz. Its transmitter was located in Skokie, Illinois, and had an ERP of 1,000 watts at a HAAT of 125 feet. The station's frequency resulted in interference problems with 98.7 WFMT. To eliminate this problem, WRSV's frequency was changed to 101.9 MHz in 1966. The frequency became available in 1964, when 101.9 WCLM in Chicago had its license revoked.

In 1969, the station's transmitter was moved to the Civic Opera Building and its ERP was increased to 12,000 watts. In 1970, controlling interest in Radio Skokie Valley was sold to Bonneville International for $479,000.

=== WCLR ===
On December 10, 1970, the station's call sign was changed to WCLR, standing for "clear", a theme that was used heavily in its advertising. WCLR aired a beautiful music format through 1975. WCLR played approximately 75% instrumentals, along with contemporary easy listening vocals and a few standards. In 1971, the station's transmitter was moved to the John Hancock Center, and in 1974 its transmitter was moved to the Sears Tower.

In 1975, the station shifted to middle of the road (MOR) format, with an 80/20 vocal to instrumental ratio, in contrast to its previous strong emphasis on instrumental music. The station played a mixture of pop standards, easy listening, and soft rock.

By the early 1980s, WCLR's format had shifted to adult contemporary. The station aired a Saturday night all-request oldies program in the 1980s, hosted by Peter Dean. In the late 1980s, WCLR was branded "Chicago's Lite Rock".

=== WTMX ===
On February 21, 1989, the station's call sign was changed to WTMX, and it became known as "The New Mix 102", airing a mix of adult contemporary and oldies. By 1992, the station's format had shifted to hot AC.

In the mid 1990s, the station shifted towards a modern AC/modern rock format, and on January 25, 1996, it adopted the slogan "Today's Rock Mix". By 2006, the station's format shifted to Adult Top 40.

On January 19, 2011, Bonneville International announced the sale of WTMX, as well as 16 other stations, to Hubbard Broadcasting. The sale was completed on April 29, 2011.

From September 1996 until 2017, WTMX was home to the "Eric & Kathy" morning show hosted by Eric Ferguson and Kathy Hart. The show drew consistently strong ratings, and the duo was inducted into the National Radio Hall of Fame in 2016. In April 2017, Kathy Hart left the program, and on September 7, 2017, Hubbard Radio announced that she would not be returning to the station. Ferguson continued to host mornings, along with Melissa McGurren, Brian "Whip" Paruch, Cynthia DeNicolo and John "Swany" Swanson, and the show was rebranded as "Eric in the Morning with Melissa and Whip". During the COVID-19 pandemic, Cynthia DeNicolo was part of a Reduction In Force (RIF). On June 18, 2020, an internal restructure of talent was announced with the Nikki hosting the Midday show, Chris Petlak with Lisa Allen hosting Afternoon MIX and THE MIX New Music Club.

On December 16, 2020, after 22 years with WTMX, it was announced that Melissa McGurren had declined a contract extension and departed the station. Ferguson himself would depart the station on October 29, 2021, with him and Hubbard releasing a statement that he and the station agreed that he would depart after allegations of harassment by Ferguson, including McGurren being a constant target of it, began to surface. On January 18, 2022, the station announced that afternoon host Chris Petlak would join Nikki, Whip, Violeta, and Swany as host of "The Morning MIX".

In June 2023, suddenly and without explanation, Cynthia DeNicolo, the former assistant producer of WTMX's morning show, dropped her lawsuit against Ferguson. DeNicolo, who worked at “The Mix” for 22 years, moved to dismiss the lawsuit ahead of a tentative January 21, 2023 trial date, according to the Chicago Tribune.

The station's current weekday airstaff included Chris Petlak, Nikki and Whip on "The Morning Mix", Jenny V in middays, McCabe in afternoons, and Emma Day in evenings.
