= Eric Ferguson (radio personality) =

Chicago radio personality

David Eric Ferguson (born January 27, 1967), known professionally as Eric Ferguson, is a former Chicago morning radio personality who hosted a daily show on WTMX-FM for 25 years until 2021.

== Early life and education ==
Ferguson is a native of Elburn, Illinois. He graduated from the University of Iowa in 1989.

== Professional career ==
Ferguson began his radio career in Chicago as an intern at WYTZ-FM in Chicago and later was a producer for Chicago on-air personality John Records Landecker. He then was a producer for the "Morning Zoo" on WYTZ-FM. He later began hosting a morning show on WMMZ-FM in Gainesville/Ocala, Florida. Ferguson also hosted an evening shift at WHXT in Allentown, Pennsylvania and morning shows on WPXR in Rock Island, Illinois and WZOK in Rockford, Illinois. Ferguson later worked at KWMX-FM in Denver.

Ferguson and Kathy Hart, who he had never met before were paired up as cohosts of the morning show at WTMX in Chicago in 1996, and were named to the position. The duo, known as "The Eric & Kathy Show," went on to tremendous ratings success, and appeared in a successful, multiyear ad campaign that placed their faces on billboards around the Chicago area.

In 2001, Ferguson signed a five-year, $5 million contract renewal at WTMX.

In 2016, Ferguson and Hart (whose birth name is Kathy Achenbach) were inducted into the Radio Hall of Fame as "The Eric & Kathy Show". After 21 years, Ferguson's partnership with his cohost Hart unraveled in 2017, when she spent four months off the air. In September 2017, WTMX fired Hart, and the show was rebranded "Eric in the Morning."

On September 27, 2021, the Chicago Tribune broke the news that Ferguson had been sued in May 2021 in Cook County Circuit Court by a former producer on his show, Cynthia DeNicolo, who alleged that Ferguson had abused his power to coerce sexual favors early in her career, and then blocked promotions as punishment after she refused to resume an unwanted sexual relationship. Ferguson was taken off the air soon after, and formally left the radio show in late October.

According to the lawsuit, Ferguson is accused of coercing DeNicolo, who then was known as Cynthia Skolak, into performing oral sex about twice a month from January 2004 until August 2004. After she ended that relationship, DeNicolo alleged in the lawsuit that Ferguson continued to ask for sexual favors and constantly reminded her of his power over her job. Both Ferguson's lawyers and management at WTMX parent Hubbard Radio Chicago have denied the allegations, with Hubbard Radio Chicago stating that it performed both an internal and an external investigation into the matter and found no evidence to corroborate illegal workplace conduct.

Former co-host and long-time radio station employee Melissa McGurren joined the suit against Ferguson, alleging workplace sexual abuse and misconduct. The Equal Employment Opportunity Commission is also investigating.

On June 27, 2023, the Chicago Tribune reported that the woman who accused former WTMX-FM morning host Eric Ferguson of coercing her to perform sexual acts, then retaliating against her at work when she stopped complying, has dropped her explosive lawsuit against the sidelined radio personality.

The lawsuit by former assistant producer Cynthia DeNicolo, filed in May 2021, sparked a tumultuous two years of public battles for Ferguson and Hubbard Radio Chicago, the company that owns the adult contemporary station at 101.9.

Lawyers were due in court for a case management conference in preparation for a tentative Jan. 21 trial date. But court records show that DeNicolo requested to dismiss the litigation.

== Personal life ==
Ferguson has four children, including one step daughter, with his former wife Jennifer Ferguson. The couple divorced in 2020. Ferguson lives in Hinsdale, Illinois.
