= Obelit Yadgar =

American radio personality (1941–2023)

Obelit Yadgar (June 29, 1941 – August 30, 2023), aka Obie Yadgar, was an Assyrian-American radio personality from Glendale, Wisconsin.

Yadgar was born in Baghdad, Iraq. Raised in Tehran, he moved to the United States in 1957. He was drafted into the US Army's 4th Infantry Division, serving as a combat correspondent in Vietnam in 1967 and 1968.

Yadgar spent eight years at radio station WFMR in Milwaukee during the 1970s, and another 10 years at the station during the late 1980s and early 1990s. He was named "Best Morning Announcer" by Milwaukee Magazine. In 1996 he moved to the Chicago radio station WNIB. In 2002 he moved back to WFMR but was let go during an early-2004 move by the station to satellite-delivered programming.

He contributed to the Assyrian magazine Zinda, and had made appearances on Chicago Public Radio.

Yadgar died on August 30, 2023.
