= Charles Pangle =

American politician

Charles L. "Chuck" Pangle (June 5, 1941 – December 25, 2015) was an American businessman and politician.

Born in Bradley, Illinois, Pangle graduated from Bradley Bourbonnais Community High School and then served in the United States Navy. He went to Kankakee Community College and University of California. He was a realtor, lobbyist, and owned a collection agency. Pangle lived in Bourbonnais, Illinois. He served as the county treasurer for Kankakee County, Illinois and was a Democrat. Pangle was an unsuccessful candidate for the Illinois House of Representatives in the 1976 general election. Pangle served in the Illinois House of Representatives from 1983 to 1987. Pangle worked for the Illinois Department of Conservation. He then switched to the Republican Party; in 1992, he ran for a seat in the Illinois Senate and lost the election. He died at his home in Bourbonnais, Illinois.
