= Joyce Elbert =

American author

- Born: 26 February 1930; Bronx, New York, USA
- Died: 8 May 2009 (aged 79); Volusia, Florida, USA
- Education: Hunter College
- Occupation: Writer
- Writing career
- Years active: 1963–1984
- Notable works: The Crazy Ladies (1969), The Goddess Hangup (1970)

Joyce Elbert (February 26, 1930 - May 8, 2009) was an American writer. She was the author of ten published novels and a collection of memoirs.

== Life and career ==
Elbert was born in the Bronx, New York City, on February 26, 1930, the only child of Melba and Charles Krimmer, an Austrian immigrant whose once-thriving dress manufacturing company went bankrupt during the Great Depression. She attended New York City's Christopher Columbus High School (Bronx) and Hunter College, from which she received a bachelor of arts degree in Journalism in 1952.

In 1958, Elbert was one of the founding editors of the Provincetown Review, a literary magazine for which author Norman Mailer served as advisor. Her first novel, the semi-autobiographical Getting Rid of Richard, was completed in 1959 although it didn't see publication until 1972. Her 1969 novel, The Crazy Ladies, was dubbed "the first really great dirty book" by Cosmopolitan magazine. By 1980, more than 5,000,000 copies of her books were in print worldwide, including translations into Spanish, French, and German.

Elbert's last published novel, The Return of the Crazy Ladies, was released in 1984. She died on May 8, 2009, in Volusia, Florida, of amyotrophic lateral sclerosis (Lou Gehrig's disease), leaving behind at least seven unpublished novels, as well as several short stories and autobiographical essays.

== Works ==
Novels

- A Martini on the Other Table (1963) Signet
- The Crazy Ladies (1969) New American Library
- The Goddess Hangup (1970) World Publishing Group
- Getting Rid of Richard (1972) Arbor House
- Drunk in Madrid (1972) Arbor House
- The Three of Us (1973) Arbor House
- The Crazy Lovers (1976) Rawson, Wade
- A Very Cagey Lady (1980) Signet
- Red Eye Blues (1981) Signet
- The Return of the Crazy Ladies (1984) Signet

Memoirs

- A Tale of Five Cities & Other Memoirs (2022) Tough Poets Press
