= Jerome J. Joyce =

American politician (1939–2019)

Jerome Joyce

Member of the Illinois Senate from the 43rd district
- In office January 1975 – April 1992
- Preceded by: Edward McBroom
- Succeeded by: Janet J. Joyce

Personal details
- Born: June 14, 1939 Essex, Illinois, U.S
- Died: June 19, 2019 (aged 80) Reddick, Illinois, U.S
- Party: Democratic
- Spouse: Janet Meece
- Children: Four
- Profession: Farmer

Jerome J. Joyce (June 14, 1939 — June 19, 2019) was an American farmer, businessman and politician who served as a Democratic member of the Illinois Senate from the 43rd district from 1975 until his retirement in 1992.

== Early life and career ==
Jerome J. Joyce was born June 14, 1939, in Reddick, Illinois. After graduating Reddick Community High School, he became a farmer. In 1969, Joyce was elected to the Kankakee County Board of Supervisors from Essex Township. In 1972, when the Illinois Supreme Court ruled that county boards must be elected by a one man, one vote system, Joyce ran for, and won, a seat on the county board as an Independent.

== Illinois Senate ==
In the 1974 elections, Joyce ran for the Illinois Senate's 43rd district, which included Grundy, Kankakee, Iroquois, Ford counties along with the southwestern portion of Will County. In an upset, Joyce defeated Kankakee County Republican Party chairman and incumbent Senator Edward McBroom in the general election. Upon taking office, Joyce associated himself with the Democratic Study Group, also known as the "Crazy 8," a group of independent, reform-minded Democrats. The group was able to make a successful push for better committee assignments for its members. Joyce served as vice chairman of the Agricultural, Conservation and Energy committee and served as a member of the Transportation, Local Government Affairs and Veterans & Pensions committees. He was also a member of the Legislative Commission to Visit and Examine State Institutions and chairman of the Regional Manpower Commission.

In 1982, the 43rd district was redrawn to include all of Grundy and Kankakee counties, most of Iroquois County, and portions of Will and LaSalle counties. During his tenure, he was considered a potential running mate for Neil Hartigan's potential 1986 gubernatorial bid. In the Republican controlled 1991 legislative remap, he was gerrymandered into the same legislative district as fellow Democrat Thomas A. Dunn of Joliet. He retired in 1992 and was replaced by his wife Janet J. Joyce who served the remainder of her husband's term until January 1993.

=== Agriculture ===
As the only farmer in the Illinois Senate for much of his tenure, Joyce was a leader on agricultural issues. He served on the committee responsible for agriculture during his entire tenure. In 1985, he led a group of Illinois farmers in lobbying for more favorable policy speaking with Paul Volcker and working with Senator Alan J. Dixon and Congressmen Robert H. Michel and Edward Rell Madigan on a relief package. In the early 1990s, Joyce sponsored legislation to mandate all gasoline sold in the state contain 10% ethanol in an effort to help corn growers and rural counties.

=== Transportation ===
Joyce was a supporter of the Illiana Expressway and a southern extension of I-355 to Interstate 80. He also supported the building of a proposed Chicago south suburban airport in the southland region with an emphasis on its benefits for Kankakee County. He also advocated for a bill to allow townships to opt out of participation in the Regional Transportation Authority.

=== Other legislative priorities ===
Joyce advocated for legislation to have an elected Illinois Commerce Commission rather than one appointed by the Governor of Illinois. He voted in favor of a measure that would ban the sale, manufacture and import of semiautomatic weapons and their possession with a large capacity magazine.

== Post political career ==
Joyce returned to his farming career and started Environmental Partners, Inc., a disposal company. He died June 19, 2019. His son, Patrick, was appointed to represent portions of Grundy and Kankakee counties on November 8, 2019.
