= Edward McBroom =

American farmer, businessman, and politician

Edward McBroom (February 18, 1925 – October 2, 1990) was an American farmer, businessman, and politician.

Born in Kankakee, Illinois, McBroom served in the United States Navy. He went to the University of Illinois. McBroom owned an automobile dealership and a travel agency. He also owned a farm. McBroom served as a Republican member of the Illinois House of Representatives from 1963 to 1965 and from 1977 to 1983. He also served in the Illinois Senate from 1967 until his loss to Jerome J. Joyce in the 1974 general election as part of the anti-Watergate backlash. In 1976, President Gerald Ford appointed McBroom to the National Highway Safety Advisory Committee. After his second House tenure, he served on the Board of Review of the Illinois Department of Employment Security until at least 1989.

McBroom served as the Chairman of the Kankakee County Republican Party for twenty-two years. Political observer Rich Miller, publisher of Capitol Fax, compared McBroom's political control in Kankakee to that of Richard J. Daley in Cook County. McBroom died at St. Mary's Hospital in Kankakee, Illinois.
