= Kaelan Joyce =

Gibraltarian boxer

Personal information
- Nationality: British
- Born: 20 August Gibraltar
- Height: 5 ft 11 in (1.80 m)
- Weight: Light Heavyweight

Boxing career

Kaelan Joyce
Medal record

2003 BUSA Boxing Championships
Gold medal – first place	Coventry	Middleweight

Kaelan Joyce (born 20 August 1982), is an amateur boxer from the British Overseas Territory, Gibraltar. He started his boxing career in January 2000 as a Middleweight and competed exclusively in Gibraltar at first, but then mostly abroad thereafter.

== University days ==
Kaelan was awarded a place at Southampton Solent University (UK) in September 2002, where he went on to earn an honours degree in a Computer Networking related subject. Whilst at University he trained at the Golden Ring ABC (Southampton, UK) where he gained valuable experience and subsequently went on to win gold at the BUSA (British Universities Sports Association) Championships, thus becoming champion of his respective weight class. He remains the only Gibraltarian to date to accomplish such a feat.

== Boxing career and background ==
Joyce started off as a brawler with limited boxing skills but with time developed into a decent boxer. Known for his aggressive style and sturdy defence, he improved considerably under the watchful eye of Ernest Victory (Head coach – Gibraltar Amateur Boxing Association).

Kaelan has sparred with several big names including Tom "Kong" Watson and former World Boxing Foundation (WBFo) Super Featherweight Champion Carl Greaves. He has also fought and beaten renowned British Martial Artist, Jason "Daddy Cool" Ball in an amateur boxing bout that took place on 3 July 2008 at the Victoria Stadium, Gibraltar.

Currently competing in the light heavyweight division (having moved up a weight class) Joyce lost his last bout on points, which took place on 17 April 2010 at the Don Principe Pabellon (Spain). The Spanish media had Joyce winning.

== Let’s Dance 2009 ==
Joyce appeared on Gibraltar's version of Dancing with the Stars called Let's Dance, which was aired live on GBC Television for over six weeks. He managed to get to the final and finished in 3rd place. This was partly due to the substantial number of public votes he received. The show was a success and several thousand pounds were raised for the local charities.
