= Joyce Dees =

American politician

Member of the Arkansas House of Representatives from the 8th district
- In office January 13, 2003 – January 10, 2005
- Preceded by: Bill Pritchard
- Succeeded by: Gregg Reep

Member of the Arkansas House of Representatives from the 76th district
- In office January 11, 1999 – January 13, 2003
- Preceded by: Marian Owens-Ingram
- Succeeded by: Billy Gipson

Personal details
- Born: July 30, 1954 (age 71) Prattsville, Arkansas
- Party: Democratic

Joyce Dees (born July 30, 1954) is an American politician who served in the Arkansas House of Representatives from 1999 to 2005.
