= WCLM (Chicago) =

Radio station in Chicago (1957–1966)

Coordinates: 41.8880°N 87.6242°W

- Chicago, Illinois; United States
- Broadcast area: Chicago metropolitan area
- Frequency: 101.9 MHz

Ownership
- Owner: Carol Music, Inc.

History
- First air date: May 25, 1957
- Last air date: August 1966
- Call sign meaning: Carol Music

Technical information
- Class: B (grandfathered)
- ERP: 60,000 watts
- HAAT: 520 feet (160 m)

WCLM was a radio station operating on 101.9 FM in Chicago between 1957 and 1966. The station lost its broadcast license over several violations, the most notable of which was the use of its subsidiary communications authority (SCA) subcarrier facility to transmit the results of horse races on an additional audio channel.

== History ==
Carol Music, Inc., a company that provided wired background music to businesses and restaurants, applied for a construction permit for a new FM station in Chicago on July 2, 1956. The Federal Communications Commission granted the permit on August 30. The transmitter was located on a 96-foot (29 m) tower atop 333 North Michigan, which was installed in March 1957. WCLM signed on May 25, 1957, broadcasting originally at 18 kW. The station later obtained authorization to increase its effective radiated power to 60 kW.

It would not be long, however, before WCLM's broadcasts, which, like the wired service, were primarily oriented at retail establishments, came in for scrutiny. In 1959, the Federal Bureau of Investigation, the intelligence unit of the Chicago Police Department, and the anti-racketeering section of the Office of the Attorney General of the United States opened an inquiry into Carol Music. However, it was an action taken on December 15, 1961, that sparked the interest of the Federal Communications Commission. On that day, a Chicago company known as Newsplex, Inc., began using the SCA channel on WCLM to broadcast the results of horse races to businesses. The lease of the SCA to Newsplex, a company that—like Carol Music—was managed by William Drenthe, was never reported to the FCC. Further, a routine check revealed that WCLM had broadcast the results of a Florida horse race only 20 minutes after its conclusion, when Florida law at the time required race results to be delayed 30 minutes before being sent by newswires. On July 26, 1962, the FCC ordered WCLM to show cause why its license should not be revoked. In addition to the SCA issues, the FCC claimed that WCLM, with its programming of music and commercials for chain grocery stores, failed to provide the balanced service of entertainment, music, and news that it had promised at its license renewal. It also found that the station had failed to maintain operating logs. Newsplex ceased operating on September 15, 1962.

In April 1963, the FCC issued Drenthe, who by that time was no longer the general manager of WCLM, a subpoena to appear at the station's license revocation hearing. Upon receiving and opening the subpoena, Drenthe suffered a heart attack. After the hearing, the two examiners recommended in September that the FCC revoke WCLM's license. They found that the horse race results broadcast on the SCA channel and received by bookies on equipped radios rented from Newsplex were timely enough so as to aid illegal gambling, even though station officials had stated at a 1962 press conference that these results were broadcast on a 30-minute delay. The station also claimed that the FCC used data gathered in its hearings to aid the FBI investigation.

On July 24, 1964, the FCC issued its final decision ordering WCLM off the air by unanimous vote. The commission said that Carol Music had failed to program the station in accordance with the proposals made by the company when applying for its license and had used the SCA for a purpose other than that originally stated, noting that the other violations found in the hearing made it unnecessary for the FCC to consider the horse race results service as a factor in revoking the license. It denied a petition for reconsideration that November, but Carol Music appealed in federal court, keeping the station on the air into 1965. The court granted the FCC's motion to dismiss the appeal in November, in effect upholding the revocation. A final attempt to stay a revocation order was denied, and in August 1966, WCLM finally left the air, with the FCC authorizing August 27 as the latest date the station could cease operations.

The 101.9 frequency did not stay vacant long in the Chicago area, which at the time was the battleground for a complex series of competing applications, interference concerns, and short-spacing complaints. In December 1964, the FCC proposed relocating the frequency from Chicago to Skokie to solve interference problems. Station WRSV had gone on the air in 1961 at 98.3, causing considerable interference to second-adjacent station WFMT at 98.7 and generating interference complaints from listeners of WRSV and WFMT. It was also substantially short-spaced, per the mileage separations at the time, to WFMT and WHFC at 97.9. In September 1966, with WCLM off the air, WRSV moved to 101.9, though it could not use the exact facilities of WCLM, as these were grandfathered into the later introduction of FM station classes.
