= WDRV =

Classic rock radio station in Chicago

- Chicago, Illinois; United States
- Broadcast area: Chicago metropolitan area
- Frequency: 97.1 MHz (HD Radio)
- Branding: 97.1 The Drive

Programming
- Format: Classic rock
- Subchannels: HD2: Classic rock

Ownership
- Owner: Hubbard Broadcasting; (Chicago FCC License Sub, LLC)
- Sister stations: WTMX, WTBC-FM, WWDV

History
- First air date: July 9, 1955
- Former call signs: WNIB (1955–2001)
- Call sign meaning: "Drive"

Technical information
- Licensing authority: FCC
- Facility ID: 49552
- Class: B
- ERP: 8,300 watts (analog); 297 watts (digital)
- HAAT: 363 meters (1,191 ft)
- Transmitter coordinates: 41°53′6.1″N 87°37′18.2″W
- Repeater: See § Signal note

Links
- Public license information: Public file; LMS
- Webcast: Listen live
- Website: wdrv.com

WDRV (97.1 FM, "The Drive") is a commercial radio station licensed to Chicago, Illinois, United States. The station is owned by Hubbard Broadcasting and airs a classic rock format. Its studios were originally located in the John Hancock Center. On May 11, 2018, WDRV moved into all new, state-of-the-art, digital studios in Chicago's Prudential Plaza. WDRV's antenna is located atop the Aon Center. The station's programming is simulcast on WWDV in Zion, Illinois.

WDRV uses HD Radio and broadcasts a classic rock format branded as "Deep Tracks" on its HD2 subchannel.

== History ==
=== WNIB ===
==== Early history ====
WNIB was founded and built by Bill Florian. The call letters stood for Northern Illinois Broadcasting. The station began broadcasting on July 9, 1955, and had the slogan "Chicago's FM Voice of Variety." It primarily broadcast jazz, show tunes, and easy listening music.

Bill Gershon was among the first announcers. Among the other announcers in the early years were Bill Plante, who went on to become a fixture at CBS News, Marty Robinson and Don Tait, both of whom later worked for WFMT, and Ken Alexander, who later worked for WAIT 820, but later returned to WNIB.

==== Programming and personalities ====
Gershon had the idea of playing classical music Sunday evenings and stated, "Classical music wasn't part of our programming at first, since most other FM stations aired lots of classical music, especially WFMT and WEFM. But I told Bill we should make use of the 12 records we had in the library. He said, 'All right. Just don't have any of that ivory-tower stuff here.'" By early 1957 Gershon had left the station, but classical music's presence at the station was expanded, though Florian said that it was a tough sell.

Sonia Atzeff, a graduate of Roosevelt University in Chicago, was hired as program director in 1958, and she steered WNIB's programming toward a classical music format. As a classical station, WNIB would later be branded "Classical 97". Sonia Atzeff and Bill Florian were married in 1967, and Sonia later became general manager of the station, a position she held until its sale in 2001.

Ron Ray began as a part-time announcer on WNIB in 1968. Working concurrently at 105.9 WXFM, Ray pre-recorded his announcements. In 1977, Ray began working full-time at WNIB as program director. Live classical hosts on WNIB over the years included Fred Heft, Jay Andres, Bruce Duffie, Carl Grapentine, Scott Thomas, and Obie Yadgar. Miller Peters was the station's music director in its final years, and also served as a weekend host. Syndicated programs included Adventures in Good Music with Karl Haas, which aired Mon–Fri at 7 p.m.

While classical music was the station's primary focus, for a period, brokered ethnic and religious programming aired in some late night hours. The brokered ethnic and religious programming were dropped in the 1980s.

Florian, a jazz aficionado, also hired Dick Buckley as a DJ for the station's jazz programming. Neil Tesser also hosted a jazz program on WNIB from 1974 to 1976. Blues hosts included Mr. A. and Big Bill Collins.

Those Were the Days, a four-hour old-time radio program hosted by Chuck Schaden, aired on WNIB Saturdays from September 6, 1975, until February 10, 2001. Dick Lawrence hosted The Dick Lawrence Review, a weekly program on WNIB that featured nostalgic commentary and readings, along with vintage music.

==== Facilities ====
WNIB's studios and transmitter were originally located at the Midwest Hotel, at Hamlin and Madison in West Garfield Park. Subsequent studio locations for WNIB included 108 N. State St., Riverside Plaza, 25 E. Chestnut St., 12 East Delaware Place, and finally 1140 W. Erie. In 1968, the station's transmitter was moved to the Civic Opera Building. In 1976, WNIB's antenna and transmitter were relocated to the top of the Standard Oil Building.

In 1983, the Florians purchased 96.9 WKZN in Zion, Illinois, for $1 million. The station's call sign was changed to WNIZ, and it began simulcasting the programming of WNIB. The following year, WNIB's ERP was increased from 850 watts to 8,400 watts. Its ratings grew significantly in the following years, and by the late 1980s it began to surpass 98.7 WFMT.

==== Further history ====
In 1969, WNIB began publishing a monthly program guide which listed all the music being played each day on the station. The inclusion of the label and record number enabled listeners to purchase things they enjoyed hearing, and the subscription price helped keep the station going during the leaner times. The covers at first had details of well-known artworks, and later had original sketches and caricatures by Richard Kimmel and Robert Kameczura.

When 99.5 WEFM was sold and abandoned its longtime classical music format in 1978, a portion of its classical music library was donated to WNIB as part of the settlement to permit the station's sale.

WNIB was also famous for having dogs and cats in residence, which were audible at times during announcements. The animals were featured in local media, and listeners seemed to enjoy knowing that they were there.

In 1999, the media brokerage team of Bob Heymann and Jack Minkow began serious discussions with Bill and Sonia Florian regarding the possible value of WNIB (and WNIZ) in a sale to another Chicago radio station owner. After much deliberation, in 2000 the Florians listed the stations with Heymann and Minkow. There was significant interest from a number of broadcasters with Bonneville International in November 2000 ultimately making the best offer of $165,000,000 cash for the FM licenses, the WNIB transmitter lease at the Standard Oil Building, the studio lease for WNIZ in Zion, Illinois, and the WNIZ transmitter site and tower in Pleasant Prairie, Wisconsin. With the proceeds of the sale, the Florians established the NIB Foundation, which awarded grants to music, dance, environmental, and animal rights causes.

After the completion of a final program on February 11, 2001, the station was turned off. The following day, new owners took the air with a different format.

Bill Florian died on December 7, 2016, of lung cancer at the age of 84.

=== WDRV ===
On February 12, 2001, 97.1 began to stunt with all day sets from artists such as Barbra Streisand, Garth Brooks, the Beach Boys, Madonna, Pink Floyd, and the Beatles, while its simulcast partner 96.9 WNIZ began simulcasting 101.9 WTMX. On March 15, 2001, the call sign was changed to WDRV, and the station adopted a classic hits format as "The Drive". In 2003, 96.9 in Zion began simulcasting WDRV, and its call sign was changed to WWDV.

Over the years, The Drive's format evolved into a broad-based classic rock format.

Bonneville announced the sale of WDRV and 16 other stations, to Hubbard Broadcasting on January 19, 2011. The sale was completed on April 29, 2011.

On June 27, 2011, WDRV celebrated its 10th anniversary by organizing a free-entrance concert at the Rosemont Theatre by America and headliner Jethro Tull.

Online streaming of the "Deep Tracks" programming broadcast on WDRV's HD2 subchannel was discontinued in October 2013, due to its popularity. The high amount of traffic to the site made the stream too expensive to maintain, considering the cost of the service, royalty payments and lack of commercials to offset costs.

The station celebrated its 15th anniversary on Friday, May 20, 2016, with a concert at the Rosemont Theater featuring Boston and Jefferson Starship.

WDRV features The Sherman & Tingle Show (Brian Sherman and Steve Tingle which debuted the morning of October 31, 2016.

The station's current weekday airstaff includes Sherman & Tingle (mornings), Bob Stroud (host Ten at 10), Janda Lane (middays), Tim Virgin (afternoons), and Alice Cooper (nights).

== Signal note ==
WDRV is short-spaced to sister station WWDV (licensed to serve Zion, Illinois) as they operate on adjacent channels and the cities they are licensed to serve are only 40 miles apart. The minimum distance between two Class B FM radio stations operating on adjacent channels according to current FCC rules is 105 miles. Both stations use directional antennas to reduce their signals toward each other.
