= John T. Joyce =

American businessman and politician

John T. Joyce (May 24, 1894 – August 16, 1930) was an American businessman and politician.

Joyce was born in Chicago, Illinois and went to the Chicago parochial and public schools. He also went to the Lane Technical night school. Joyce served in the United States Navy during World War I. He lived in Chicago with his wife and family and was in the real estate and insurance business. Joyce served in the Illinois House of Representatives from 1921 to 1923 and then served in the Illinois Senate from 1923 until his death in 1930. Joyce was a Republican. He died at his apartment in a hotel in Chicago, Illinois from possible poisoning.
