= Janet J. Joyce =

American politician (1940–2015)

Janet J. Joyce (née Meece; January 19, 1940 – March 27, 2015) was an American farmer and politician.

Born in Chenoa, Illinois, Joyce went to Reddick High School in Reddick, Illinois. She married Jerome J. Joyce and they lived on a farm in Reddick, Illinois. Jerome J. Joyce served in the Illinois Senate from 1975 until his resignation in April 1992. His wife Janet J. Joyce was appointed to the Illinois Senate and served until January 1993. She was a Democrat. Janet Joyce died at her home in Reddick, Illinois. Thomas A. Dunn succeeded her. Her son, Patrick, was appointed to represent portions of Grundy and Kankakee counties on November 8, 2019.
