= WWDV =

Classic rock radio station in Zion, Illinois

Satellite of WDRV, Chicago
- Zion, Illinois; United States
- Broadcast area: Southeast Wisconsin, Lake County, Illinois
- Frequency: 96.9 MHz (HD Radio)
- Branding: The Drive

Programming
- Format: Classic rock
- Subchannels: HD2: "Deep Tracks" (Classic rock)

Ownership
- Owner: Hubbard Broadcasting; (Chicago FCC License Sub, LLC)
- Sister stations: WDRV, WTBC-FM, WTMX

History
- First air date: November 4, 1962
- Former call signs: WAXO (1962–1969); WKZN (1969–1980); WKZN-FM (1980–1983); WNIZ-FM (1983–2001); WTNX (2001–2003)
- Call sign meaning: "Drive"

Technical information
- Licensing authority: FCC
- Facility ID: 49547
- Class: B
- ERP: 50,000 watts (horizontal); 38,000 watts (vertical)
- HAAT: 148 meters (486 ft)
- Transmitter coordinates: 42°30′35.1″N 87°53′11.3″W

Links
- Public license information: Public file; LMS
- Webcast: Listen live
- Website: www.wdrv.com

WWDV (96.9 FM) is a radio station in Zion, Illinois, known as "The Drive". The station is currently owned by Hubbard Broadcasting, and is a full-time simulcast of Chicago-licensed WDRV (97.1 MHz), serving the Kenosha, Wisconsin–Waukegan, Illinois, area. "The Drive" programs a broad-based classic rock format.

== History ==
=== WAXO ===
WAXO first signed on the air on November 4, 1962; the first voice heard was that of Paul Weyrich. The station's effective radiated power then was 3,500 watts, broadcasting from a transmitter and 143-foot (44 m) tower at 6400 67th Street and studios in the Isermann Building at 616 56th Street in downtown Kenosha, Wisconsin. In 1966, WAXO built new AM/FM studios at the transmitter/tower location, and moved operations there. The building is now a medical facility, though the WAXO tower supports remain on the grounds.

WAXO was Kenosha's second modern-day radio station after WLIP and was billed as "The new voice of a new and greater Kenosha". WAXO's first station manager was longtime broadcaster Roy Ambrose of Manitowoc, Wisconsin; Paul Weyrich was the first program director and Don Jensen was the first news director. Subsequent station managers included Richard Blaha and Darrell Gorr. In a late-1968 promotional stunt, WAXO announcer Gary Anderson held a record for constant on-air broadcast duties by performing an air shift of 96.9 hours.

Service Broadcasting Corporation owned WAXO between 1962 and June 14, 1969. Arnold Johnson was president, Dr. Robert Heller was executive vice-president, and John E. Malloy Esq. was secretary-treasurer.

The company had always intended to operate an AM radio station, and there was an available AM frequency allocation on 1500 kilohertz. However, there were competing interests for the AM license, most notably from neighboring Zion, Illinois, which had lost its 50,000–watt radio station in a 1930s fire. After lengthy testimony the Federal Communications Commission (FCC) decided to grant the AM 1500 license to the Zion-Benton Broadcasting Company of Zion (principals: Billie Bicket and family), and the station became WZBN, signing on the air on September 19, 1967. After that, Service Broadcasting decided to sell WAXO, and competition developed for the licensed 96.9 FM frequency from broadcasting interests in both Zion and Racine, Wisconsin. The owners of WZBN in Zion were the successful applicants, and paid $250,000 for WAXO. Within weeks a lightning strike destroyed the transmitter and WAXO's new owners were granted permission for an increase in power to 10,000 watts horizontal and 8,100 watts vertical and a new 500-foot (150 m) antenna tower at Dexter's Corner, Wisconsin.

=== Typical WAXO programming ===
- Sundial with Paul Weyrich
- The Mike is Yours with Larry Taylor
- Home Executive Club with Lida Hindley
- The Noon Report and Showtime with Don Jensen
- The Chuck Presley Show - Chuck Presley
- The Lou Rugani Show - Lou Rugani
- Sentimental Journey with Augie Gnorski (Gus Gnorski)
- Moondial with Jay Wells
- Passport to Italy with Mario Capponi
- Your Opinion Please with Roy Ambrose/Wayne Blackmon
- Sounds of Stereo (Chester Electronics) Gary Anderson/Dick Scott
- The Big Bands with Lew Strangberg
- Play By Play with Jim Wynne
- Invitation to Music with Wayne Blackmon
- The Frank Carmichael Show - Frank Carmichael
- The Hammond Organ Show with Lillian Crawford (and later, Lillian Gildenstern)

=== WKZN ===
By autumn of 1969 Zion-Benton Broadcasting had changed the call sign to WKZN (for "Waukegan-Kenosha-Zion-Newport"). The station's on-air moniker was "KZ97". The new ownership had ordered and installed a new Schafer automation system, then sold the three-year-old building and moved the WKZN studios to 2219 63rd Street in uptown Kenosha, which was built as a fire station. By 1971 WKZN was moved from Kenosha to combined WZBN/WKZN studios on the second floor of the Bicket Pharmacy (a former bank building constructed in 1909) at 2700 Sheridan Road in Zion. A second Schafer automation system was added for WZBN programming. In the early 1970s, music programming was the Adult Standards format which came from a broadcast music service on open-reel tape with PSAs and spots loaded into NAB Cartridge carousels. The AM and FM music playlists differed slightly, but the Bickets' main focus was on providing ample local news covering a beat from North Chicago, Illinois through Kenosha. News/sports/weather reports were simulcast.

=== WNIZ ===
In 1983, WKZN was sold to Northern Illinois Broadcasting, the owners of WNIB (97.1 FM), which had been experiencing interference problems from WKZN's adjoining frequency. WKZN then became WNIZ-FM, and simulcast nearly all of WNIB's programming until both stations were sold in 2000 for $158 million to Bonneville International.

On February 12, 2001, WNIB would begin stunting as a prelude to a change to classic hits as WDRV "The Drive" a month later, while WNIZ-FM became a simulcast of new sister station, WTMX. The call sign for 96.9 was changed to WTNX. This simulcast did very little for WTMX's ratings, and management felt it would be more appropriate to be paired up with its neighbor at 97.1. On January 1, 2003, 96.9 became the north metro frequency for "The Drive", and the call sign was changed to WWDV. "The Drive" would slowly evolve into a broad-based classic rock format.

Bonneville announced the sale of WWDV, as well as 16 other stations, to Hubbard Broadcasting on January 19, 2011. The sale was completed on April 29, 2011.

=== HD radio ===
In September 2006, WWDV's HD 2 station signed on simulcasting with WDRV HD 2 featuring "Deep Tracks".
