= Larry Walsh =

American politician (1948–2020)

Will County Executive
- In office January 7, 2005 – June 3, 2020
- Preceded by: Joseph Mikan
- Succeeded by: Denise Winfrey (acting)

Member of the Illinois Senate from the 43rd district
- In office January 10, 2003 – January 7, 2005
- Preceded by: Thomas A. Dunn
- Succeeded by: Arthur Wilhelmi

Personal details
- Born: March 3, 1948 Joliet, Illinois
- Died: June 3, 2020 (aged 72) Elwood, Illinois
- Party: Democratic
- Spouse: Irene
- Children: 6
- Education: Joliet Junior College (A.A.)

Lawrence M. "Larry" Walsh Sr. (March 3, 1948 – June 3, 2020) was an American farmer and politician who served as a member of the Illinois Senate from 1997 to 2005 and as the Will County Executive from 2005 until his death in 2020.

Born in Joliet, Illinois, Walsh graduated from Joliet East High School in 1966. He then received his associate degree in business and agriculture from Joliet Junior College in 1968. He was a farmer. Walsh served on the Elwood, Illinois School Board and the Jackson Township board. He also served on the Will County, Illinois Board of Commissioners and was a Democrat. Walsh served in the Illinois State Senate from 1997 to 2005.

In 2004, Walsh ran for Will County Executive, and defeated incumbent Republican Joseph Mikan with 51 percent of the vote. Walsh was re-elected in 2008, 2012, and 2016. In 2019, Walsh announced that he would not seek a fifth term in 2020. He died on June 3, 2020, and was succeeded by Denise Winfrey, the Speaker of the County Board.

Following Walsh's death, Congressman Bill Foster introduced legislation to rename the post office in Elwood, Illinois, after Walsh. The bill passed in 2023, and the post office was designated as the "Lawrence M. Larry Walsh Sr. Post Office."
