= Proposed Chicago south suburban airport =

Proposed airport in Illinois, United States

Coordinates: 41°22′35″N 87°43′05″W

The proposed Chicago south suburban airport (also referred to as the Peotone airport) is a proposed airport that would be located in Peotone, Illinois, United States, approximately 40 miles (64 km) south of Chicago. Serving in addition to the two international commercial airports serving Chicago (O'Hare and Midway), the site would serve the south suburbs of the Chicago metropolitan area. The two existing airports currently serving Chicago (O'Hare and Midway) are located within and operated by the City of Chicago, with the Northern Illinois region also served by two other international airports in Illinois and Wisconsin.

Following the expansion of O'Hare to become one of the busiest international airports in the world, proposals for a third airport have been in discussion since the end of the 1960s, with planning for the development of a site in Peotone since the late 1990s. Since its initiation over 50 years ago, a proposal for a third airport has remained controversial in terms of both cost, need, and calls for alternatives to accommodate increased air traffic demand.

== History ==
=== Initial Proposals ===
Stanley Berge, a professor at Northwestern University, first proposed a Peotone airport site on November 13, 1968. His main arguments for the proposed site were that it could have fast access to Chicago by rail and highway, that the potential site was far enough from O'Hare Airport to avoid the airports interfering with each other's flight patterns, that it would have all-weather flight safety, and that the site was environmentally compatible with the surrounding area. Berge envisioned a high-speed train service to downtown Chicago.

The Peotone site was an alternative location to a proposed lake site announced during Chicago Mayor Richard J. Daley's 1967 inaugural speech. The Chicago Public Works and Aviation Department worked cohesively with the Federal Aviation Administration during the Johnson and Nixon administrations from January 1967 to January 1970 to develop a litany of needed consultant reports beginning with an appraisal report, a summary of engineering reports, and graphic simulation studies for both a land and lake site. On January 27, 1970, Daley shelved plans for the airport, stating, "It was not necessary until the year 2000."

Following 15 years of investments at both O'Hare and Midway airports in the early 1970s, some northwest suburban leaders became concerned over noise issues at O'Hare Airport, which was the busiest airport in the world at that time and an economic boon for Chicago metropolitan area. Leaders from suburban DuPage County and suburban northwest Cook County attempted to apply political pressure to control the expansion and enhancements of O'Hare, but the airport received numerous expansions and upgrades over the next three decades. State House and Senate legislators tried three times to pass a Metropolitan Airport Authority bill from 1985 to 1987 in an effort to alleviate airspace noise and pollution from the airport, but the bill never passed. Legislators compromised on a resolution, which awarded $500,000 for a transportation study for a proposed third Chicago area airport.

=== Viability Studies ===
In 1986, state legislation created the Illinois Airport System Plan Policy Commission (IASPPC). The commission had bipartisan and tri-state support from the governors of Illinois, Indiana, and Wisconsin. Commissioners chose consultant Peat Marwick to develop the aviation studies. The first capacity study concluded that O’Hare and Midway airports alone could not accommodate the expanding Chicago aviation market, and the study recommended for another airport to be built. Senator Aldo DeAngelis of south suburban Olympia Fields advocated for the Peotone site, stating that "economic considerations would override political ones in choosing a location" for the airport.

The City of Chicago had acquired three seats on the IASPPC, bringing the total to eleven. Political pressure by the City of Chicago resulted in IASPPC members voting to eliminate all rural sites from the final vote. The final selection was between Gary Airport and Lake Calumet, a lake and region in Chicago that the airport would be built in proximity to, and the mayor's preference.

The Lake Calumet site was selected and Chicago Mayor Richard M. Daley, the son of Richard J. Daley, attempted to put a legislative bill through during the end of the state legislative session. The cost of the Lake Calumet site was $10.8 billion. State Senate President Pate Phillips did not support the bill, as it would have cost the state $2 billion for its share. It took four tries in the State House before it reached the State Senate. By July 1992, Mayor Daley declared the airport issue dead and focused on further expansions and enhancements of O'Hare and Midway airports.

=== Initial Planning ===
Planning for the South Suburban Airport began in 1984 as a cooperative venture between the states of Illinois, Indiana, Wisconsin, the city of Chicago, and the Federal Aviation Administration (FAA), which has stated that the Chicago area needs a third airport to handle growing air traffic. After many studies, the airport location alternatives were narrowed to five sites in 1990.

The state of Illinois submitted an Environmental Assessment to the FAA in March 1998 for approval of the development of an airport at a site in eastern Will County. The FAA prepared a Tier 1 Environmental Impact Statement (EIS) for site approval and land acquisition and issued a Record of Decision (ROD) on the Tier 1 EIS in July 2002, which approved the Will County, Illinois, site as a technically and environmentally feasible location for the development of a potential future air carrier airport in the south suburban area of Chicago.

The Illinois Department of Transportation (IDOT) began purchasing land for the Will County airport site in 2002, with funding of $75 million earmarked by the Illinois FIRST program. The state has purchased about half of the 4,200 acres (6.56 sq mi; 17.00 km^{2}) required for the plan. The current plan is in flux, as the position of the runways has continued to be debated. Eminent domain cases are also working their way through the courts. About three million people live in central and south Cook County, Illinois; Will County, Illinois; and Lake County, Indiana, which puts them in reasonable proximity to the proposed airport in Peotone. The airport is also expected to serve travelers from all over the Midwest.

In June 2008, the Gary-Chicago International Airport, in Gary, Indiana, announced an agreement with three local railroads (Norfolk Southern, EJ&E, and CSX) that will allow the relocation of railroad tracks so that the airport's runways may be expanded. The longer runways will allow the airport to handle larger aircraft. In March 2011, Illinois Governor Pat Quinn announced his intention to start construction "as fast as humanly possible" on an airport in Illinois; however, the FAA had not finalized plans yet, and the land acquisition was still being completed. In June, U.S. Secretary of Transportation Ray LaHood noted that there had been little call at the federal level recently for the proposed Peotone airport. However, plans for the south suburban airport were still in progress.

=== Land Acquisitions and Infrastructure Laws ===
The proposed airport is within the airspace of an existing airport, Bult Field (C56), a once-privately owned airport with a 5,000-foot runway. On July 1, 2014, IDOT purchased Bult Field and some surrounding land for $34 million for the new Chicago-area airport.

The proposed third airport was included in REBUILD Illinois, the 2019 capital bill signed into law by Governor J. B. Pritzker. The bill allocated $162 million toward road improvements that would connect Interstate 57 to the proposed airport site, an environmental review, and the completion of a master plan. At that time the state had acquired about 5,000 acres of the proposed new airport site.

In mid-2023, a state law was passed to force IDOT to review proposals to develop and maintain the airport by the end of the year.

== Support ==
An op-ed in Crain's Chicago Business by public affairs consultant Delmarie Cobb cites its proximity to five of Amazon's south suburban fulfillment centers and job opportunities for residents of the South Side of Chicago and south suburbs as reasons to support a third airport in the south suburbs.

Supporters of a new south suburban airport have historically found common ground with those opposing an expansion of O'Hare Airport. The proponents of the south suburban airport and those opposing expansion of O'Hare believe a south suburban airport would alleviate the heavy and still growing air traffic, while not necessitating the expansion of the already extremely large and busy O'Hare. It would also provide additional economic opportunities to the south suburbs.

There had been discussions on expanding the airports in either Rockford, Illinois or Milwaukee, Wisconsin and utilizing one of those airports as a third Chicago area airport. However, proponents of a third airport believe that Rockford and Milwaukee are not close enough to Chicago to be an effective option, and that expanding Milwaukee's or Gary, Indiana's airports for Chicago-bound travelers is not as financially beneficial to the state of Illinois as it will be to the states of Wisconsin or Indiana.

== Opposition ==
There is no official name beyond the south suburban airport, and two separate plans exist. The FAA refers to both proposals as South Suburban Airport. The airport would serve as an additional airport in the Chicago metropolitan area. Critics believe the airport is unnecessary and may be a failure like MidAmerica St. Louis Airport. These critic groups believe that expanding O'Hare or other existing airports in Rockford, IL; Milwaukee, WI; or Gary, IN are thought to be viable alternatives. In 2014 the Chicago Tribune reported "the major airlines serving O'Hare and Midway Airport have shown no interest in a south suburban airport."

The Peotone specific opposition to the south suburban airport includes environmentalists and farmers. Kevin Brubaker of the Environmental Law and Policy Center said the construction would destroy 1,200 acres of flood plains as well as 180 acres of wetlands.

== Alternative proposals ==
Various politicians and interest groups have proposed alternatives to a south suburban airport.

=== Lake Michigan ===
There have been several proposals to build an airport in Lake Michigan, east of the Chicago shoreline. In 1928, the city funded a plan to build an artificial island for an airport east of the near south side. In 1970, Mayor Richard J. Daley released an ambitious plan to site an airport 8.5 miles (13.7 km) offshore east of 55th Street.

The 1970 proposal envisioned an airport surrounded by a 5 miles (8.0 km) diameter circular dike. The water was to be drained from inside the dike, the airport situated on the circular lake bottom inside. A causeway would connect the airport to the shore. Harza Engineering, which prepared the plan, was experienced in dams and hydrological projects. Harza's report claimed that environmental damage would be small and localized. The city Commissioner of Public Works claimed that aquatic life would be improved.

Public opposition to the plan was strong. In addition to possible adverse impacts on the natural environment, there were concerns about the traffic infrastructure along the lake, the effect on the Hyde Park neighborhood along the shore, and the risk of dike failure. Mayor Daley publicly abandoned the plan in May, 1972.

=== Lake Calumet site ===
Four months after the election of Mayor Richard M. Daley in August 1989, the Lake Calumet site was submitted by Daley as an alternative site to the IASPPC. By February 5, 1990, Daley released a feasibility study for the Lake Calumet site which indicated that the $5 billion cost to construct the airport would be partially funded by a passenger facility charge which would generate $1.8 billion. Federal legislation sealed the passenger facility charges on August 2, 1990, in the 101st Congress's 2nd session through H.R. 5170. The proposed airport would have resulted in the demolition of Chicago's Hegewisch neighborhood along with portions of suburban Burnham and Calumet City and faced staunch opposition from Hegewisch residents. After facing opposition from Senate President Pate Philip and concerns over the cost of the airport, Daley declared the airport proposal "dead."

=== O’Hare expansion ===
After his failure to build the Lake Calumet airport, Daley focused his efforts on the expansion of O'Hare Airport. Some opponents of the O'Hare expansion are supportive of a third airport.

=== Expansion of other area airports ===
A proposal to turn the Gary/Chicago International Airport into Chicago's third major airport received a boost in early 2006 with the approval of $48 million in federal funding over the next ten years. Expansion plans include a new multi-level Intermodal Terminal combining three modes of transit – passenger rail, passenger vehicles and air travel. The rail system is designed to combine both commuter and high-speed lines.
