= Access Radio Chicago =

Access Radio Chicago was the name used for four AM radio stations in the Chicago market, all owned by Newsweb Corporation offering brokered programming, ethnic programming, and occasional music:

- WAIT 850, Crystal Lake, Illinois
- WNDZ 750, Portage, Indiana
- WSBC 1240, Chicago, Illinois
- WCFJ 1470, Chicago Heights, Illinois
