= WEDC =

Radio station in Chicago (1926–1997)

Chicago, Illinois; United States
- Frequency: 1240 kHz

Programming
- Format: Multicultural radio

Ownership
- Owner: Foreign Language Broadcasts, Inc.

History
- First air date: 1926
- Last air date: June 13, 1997
- Former frequencies: 1200 kHz (1926–1927); 1240 kHz (1927–1928); 1210 kHz (1928–1941)
- Call sign meaning: Emil Denemark Cadillac

Technical information
- Facility ID: 22044
- Transmitter coordinates: 41°58′53.1″N 87°46′20.2″W

WEDC was an AM radio station that operated on 1240 kHz in the Chicago market. It shared this frequency with WCRW and WSBC. The three stations operated as "shared-time stations" for most of their existence, a not uncommon arrangement in the early days of radio, but very rare in later years. They were also foreign language stations, catering to "niche markets". WEDC and WCRW are now off the air, with WSBC remaining.

The format of WEDC had mostly been foreign language programming, mainly Polish and Spanish.

== History ==
=== Early years ===
WEDC was first licensed on October 4, 1926, to Emil Danemark Broadcasting Station at 3850 Ogden Avenue. WEDC began operations during a chaotic period when most government regulation had been suspended, with new stations free to be set up with few restrictions, including choosing their own transmitting frequencies. As of December 31, 1926, WEDC was reported to be transmitting on a self-assigned frequency of 1200 kHz.

Following the establishment of the Federal Radio Commission (FRC), stations were initially issued a series of temporary authorizations starting on May 3, 1927. In addition, they were informed that if they wanted to continue operating, they needed to file a formal license application by January 15, 1928, as the first step in determining whether they met the new "public interest, convenience, or necessity" standard. On May 25, 1928, the FRC issued General Order 32, which notified 164 stations, including WEDC, that "From an examination of your application for future license it does not find that public interest, convenience, or necessity would be served by granting it." However, the station successfully convinced the commission that it should remain licensed.

On November 11, 1928, the FRC implemented a major reallocation of station transmitting frequencies, as part of a reorganization resulting from its implementation of General Order 40. WEDC was assigned to 1210 kHz, sharing time with WCRW and WSBC. On March 29, 1941, WEDC, along with most of the stations on 1210 kHz, moved to 1240 kHz, its frequency for the remainder of its operations, as part of the implementation of the North American Regional Broadcasting Agreement.

Foreign-language broadcasters were sometimes under government suspicion, especially during years when the country was at war, because of the fear of "un-American", or "coded" information being broadcast. A nationwide council of owners of foreign language stations, including WEDC, was formed during World War II to uphold the good name of foreign-language radio stations and ensure foreign propaganda was banned from being broadcast.

The Broadcasting Yearbook notes that WEDC operated 11 hours daily. The three stations on 1240 were each authorized eight hours, but according to Ed Jacker, owner of WCRW, "no one listened overnight" so WCRW sold its three overnight hours to WEDC.

WEDC's original studios were located on Ogden Avenue at the car dealership known as Emil Denemark Cadillac, the owner of the station. The studio was in the showroom in a glass booth. In the 1930s, the station broadcast live music of jazz bands from night club venues in Chicago.

=== 1950s–1990s ===
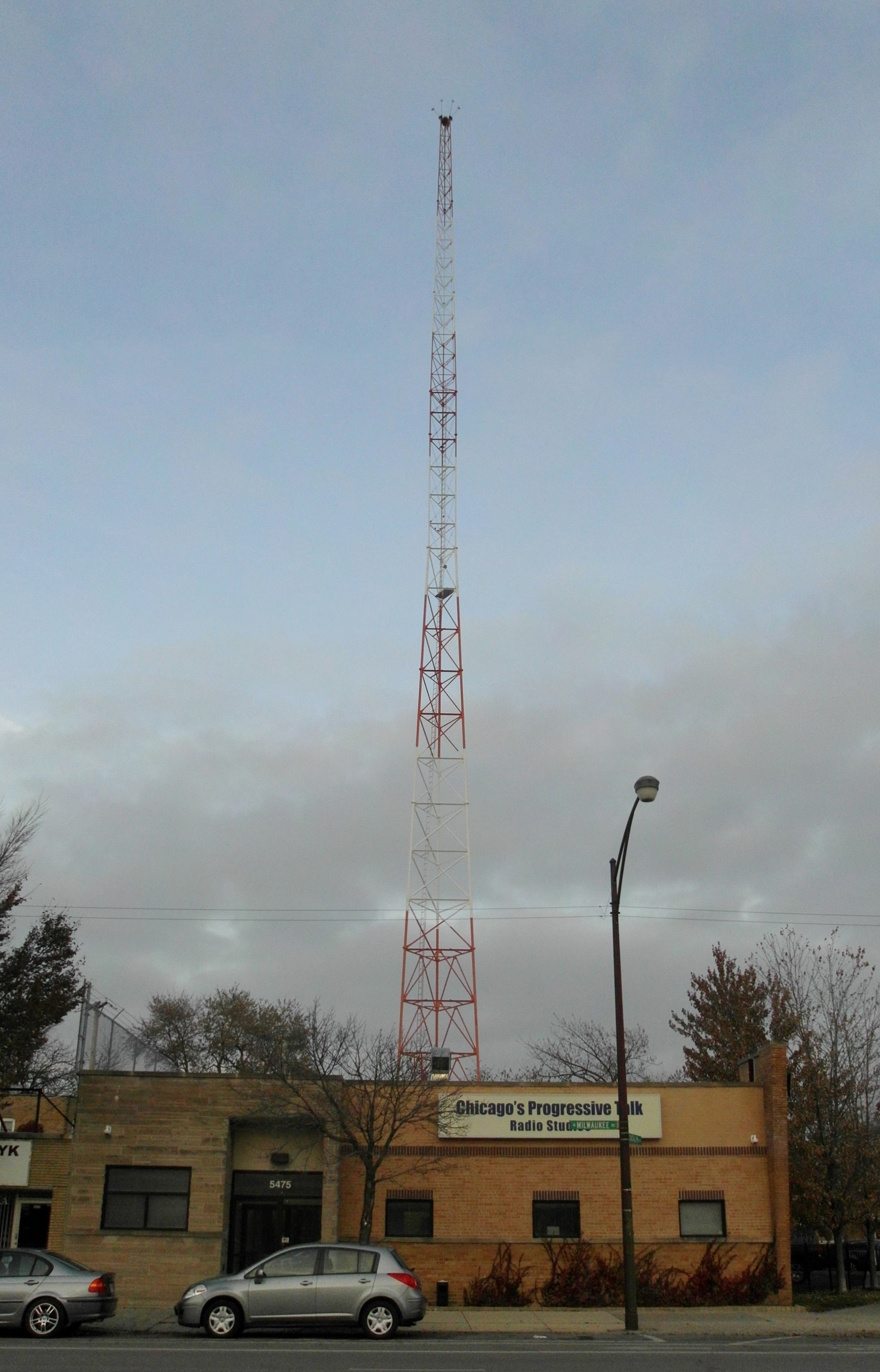
WEDC's former transmitter site on Milwaukee Ave.

In the 1960s, WEDC was purchased by Roman Pucinski for $225,000. Pucinski was a Congressman and later, a Chicago alderman. His mother was a long-time program host and did a daily Polish language program on WGES that included news, interviews, recipes, and commentary of interest to Chicago's Polish community. Pucinski purchased WEDC after WGES dropped all of its foreign language programming to become an all African American-oriented station. The Congressman fought the WGES format change because he wanted to preserve foreign-language radio programming in Chicago. Soon after Pucinski's purchase of the station, WEDC's studios and transmitter were moved to the Jefferson Park neighborhood on Milwaukee Avenue on Chicago's northwest side. In 1966, Pat Sajak, who would go on to host Wheel of Fortune, was employed to read hourly five-minute newscasts during an all-night Spanish-music radio program.

The format of WEDC had always been mostly foreign language programming, mainly Polish and Spanish. Under the Denemark ownership in the 1950s, an English language program featuring "Love Music" aired from 3:30-5 p.m. weekdays, and its overnight program, "The Midnight Fliers" (from midnight-6 a.m.) featured big band music. There was also African American-oriented programming on WEDC and its sister stations produced by Jack L. Cooper.

=== Final years ===
In 1995, WCRW was purchased by the owner of WSBC, Daniel Lee, for $500,000. A year later, he also purchased WEDC for $750,000 to make WSBC a 24-hour-a-day radio station; this ended the 60+ years of "shared-time" operation. The next year, Lee sold WSBC to Fred Eychaner's Newsweb Corporation; Eychaner was the former owner of WPWR-TV. WSBC and WEDC used separate transmitter sites, located within a mile of each other on the northwest side of Chicago. Lee was once the owner of WXRT-FM and WSCR, which were later sold to Westinghouse Broadcasting.

At midnight on June 13, 1997, WSBC took over WEDC's hours, putting an end to the last of the original time-sharing arrangements in the United States. The station's former studios are now occupied by WCPT, itself owned by Newsweb until 2024.
