= WCRW (disambiguation) =

WCRW may refer to:

- 1240 WCRW (Chicago) Chicago, Illinois (Facility ID #71296) — a defunct AM station that broadcast from 1926 to 1996 and was deleted in 2006
- 1190 WBIS Annapolis, Maryland (Facility ID #2297) — a defunct AM station that changed its callsign to WCRW in 2011 after going silent, and was deleted shortly after to allow 1200 WAGE (AM) Leesburg VA to move to 1190
- 1190 WNDC Leesburg, Virginia (Facility ID #54876) — an AM station formerly known as WAGE (AM), which changed its callsign to WCRW in April 2011 after WBIS was deleted
