= Sportsvision =

US subscription sports TV service

- Type: Pay television service (sports)
- Availability: United States
- Headquarters: Chicago, Illinois
- Owner: Jerry Reinsdorf
- Key people: Jerry Reinsdorf, Eddie Einhorn, Fred Eychaner
- Launch date: 1982
- Dissolved: 1989 (became SportsChannel Chicago)

Sportsvision (SV) was a subscription sports television service founded by Chicago White Sox owners Jerry Reinsdorf and Eddie Einhorn and media mogul Fred Eychaner. The service broadcast live sporting events, and for much of its time of operation was the broadcast network for the Chicago White Sox, Chicago Bulls, Chicago Blackhawks, and Chicago Sting.

In April 1982, WPWR-TV, then on Channel 60, dedicated a large percentage of its broadcast schedule to Sportsvision. To access the service, viewers had to buy a TV set-top converter and pay monthly subscription fees to watch a number of sports broadcasts. Ultimately, as cable television gained a foothold in the Chicago area, the pay-TV business model dissolved and, in January 1984, Sportsvision was sold to Cablevision and was moved to basic cable. In 1989, it was unscrambled and renamed SportsChannel. In 1997, SportsChannel was purchased by Fox Sports Net, with the physical linage ending with FSN Chicago's 2006 end, with NBC Sports Chicago, then Chicago Sports Network its de facto successors.
