= Neil Tesser =

American journalist and radio host (born 1951)

- Born: September 30, 1951 (age 74); New York, United States
- Education: Northwestern University
- Occupations: Author, journalist, radio host

Neil Tesser (born 1951) is a Grammy Award–winning American journalist, radio host, music critic, and author. In 2015, he received the Jazz Journalists Association's Lifetime Achievement Award in Jazz Journalism.

== Biography ==
Born in New York, Tesser grew up on Long Island. He attended Northwestern University in Evanston, Illinois, where he received a Bachelor of Arts degree in journalism. Tesser resides in Chicago.

== Career ==
Tesser's career has spanned more than five decades, and has included work as a journalist, music critic, radio host and author.

Tesser was a long-time jazz critic at the Chicago Reader, beginning his work there in the 1970s. Earlier in his career he wrote Reader's "Hot Type" column, covering sports among other topics. As a radio host, Tesser has hosted the nationally syndicated programs Miles Ahead and Listen Here!, as well as Chicago-based jazz shows on WNIB, WBEZ, WSBC, WCFJ. He currently hosts the Chicago portion of Jazz Across America, which airs and streams at KSDS -FM in San Diego.

As an author, Tesser wrote The Playboy Guide to Jazz, published in 1998 by Plume. He has composed liner notes for nearly 600 albums, which have garnered him one Grammy Award and another nomination. Artists for whom Tesser has written liner notes include Blood, Sweat & Tears, John Coltrane, Freddie Hubbard, Gil Scott-Heron, Kurt Elling, Sonny Rollins, Thelonious Monk, Chick Corea, Bill Evans and Patricia Barber.

Tesser is a member of The Recording Academy, formerly serving as vice chair of the board of trustees.

== Awards and nominations ==
Tesser received a Grammy Award for Best Album Notes at the 56th Annual Grammy Awards for his liner notes to Afro Blue Impressions (Remastered and Expanded) by John Coltrane. He was nominated for a Grammy in 1986 for his liner notes to Stan Getz's The Girl from Ipanema: The Bossa Nova Years.

On June 16, 2015, Tesser was awarded the Jazz Journalists Association's (JJA) Lifetime Achievement Award in Jazz Journalism. In addition, Tesser received the first JJA award for Excellence in Broadcasting.

He was also a recipient of an ASCAP Deems Taylor Award for his work with Rhino Records.
