= Marcelino Miyares Sotolongo =

Cuban-American politician and marketing executive (1937–2026)

Marcelino Miyares Sotolongo (1937 – March 11, 2026) was a Cuban-American marketing executive and the President of the Christian Democratic Party of Cuba, the largest political party for Cuban independence other than the Communist Party of Cuba.

Miyares became the President of the Christian Democratic Party in the U.S. in 1990 and wrote the party's manifesto "Models for a Peaceful Transition in Cuba".

== Life and career ==
Miyares was born in 1937. He gained a PhD in Political Science at the Northwestern University in Evanston, Illinois. Miyares then became a professor of political science at Benedictine University in Lisle, Illinois.

In 1970, he became founder and President of O.M.A.R.,Inc. (Operations, Marketing, Advertising and Research) one of the first Hispanic Agencies and became a creative director of many advertising campaigns aimed at the Hispanic market in the United States.

=== Television ===
In 1978, Miyares became the general partner in Hispanic American Television–Chicago, which was one of several applicants for a new TV station on channel 60 in Chicago. Hispanic American Television merged with a competing applicant for the channel, Aurora-Chicago Telecasters, to form HATCO-60, which in turn negotiated a settlement with Metrowest Corporation, headed by Fred Eychaner, to share the channel with its proposed station.

In April 1982, the two stations signed on—Eychaner's WPWR-TV and HATCO-60's WBBS-TV. WBBS-TV broadcast Spanish-language programming from 7 p.m. to 2:30 a.m., while WPWR broadcast its English-language independent fare from 2:30 a.m. to 7 p.m. Miyares and Eychaner were involved in negotiating a contract for both halves of channel 60 that brought it SportsVision, a subscription service featuring several Chicago professional sports teams. WBBS programming featured an array of novelas, variety shows and locally produced programs. The locally produced programs focused on community events, as well as weekly specialty programs such as, "Esta Semana en Baseball" hosted by John Morales and the video music show, Imagen, hosted by Chicago radio veteran, Rey Mena. In 1984, WBBS-TV gained notoriety by introducing the teen heart-throb group, Menudo, to Chicago, which included a young Ricky Martin.

WBBS-TV's market panorama changed drastically when WSNS affiliated with the Spanish International Network, triggering a realignment of Spanish-language television in Chicago that saw channel 60 lose much of its programming. WBBS ended weekday programming at the end of 1985, with the exception of weekends, when it ran Spanish movies into 1986. In early 1986, Eychaner bought the WBBS license for $11 million, allowing WPWR to go full-time.

Marcelino Miyares was also Founder and President of Times Square Studios) which produced such shows as the Montel Williams.

Since 1995, he had presided as President of MM Communications, a consultancy of mass media projects in the Americas, with offices in Miami and Panama.

=== Personal life and death ===
Miyares was married to Lourdes Gomez. He had four children – Marcelino Miyares, Juan Miyares, Maria Miyares O'Connor and Ana Miyares; and six grandchildren – Julian Issa, Martin Issa, Isabel O'Connor, Alexia Miyares, Ava Miyares, and Jack Miyares.

Marcelino Miyares Sotolongo died on March 11, 2026.

== See also ==
- Opposition to Fidel Castro
- Political parties in Cuba
- WPWR-TV
