= Sotolongo =

Sotolongo is a surname. Notable people with the surname include:

- Marcelino Miyares Sotolongo (1937–2026), Cuban-American marketing executive and political leader
- Roniel Iglesias Sotolongo (born 1988), Cuban boxer, best known for winning the junior world title at lightweight in 2006, a bronze medal at the 2008 Summer Olympics in Beijing and a gold at the 2012 Summer Olympics in London
