= WCFJ =

WCFJ may refer to:

- WCFJ (FM), a radio station (92.1 FM) licensed to serve Irmo, South Carolina, United States
- WCFJ (Illinois), a defunct radio station (1470 AM) formerly licensed to serve Chicago Heights, Illinois, United States
