= General Order 32 =

1928 American reduction of radio broadcasting stations

The Federal Radio Commission's (FRC) General Order 32, dated May 25, 1928, notified 164 of the over 600 existing U.S. radio stations that their applications for continued operation would be denied unless they showed that they met the FRC's "public interest, convenience, or necessity" standard. The result was the elimination of more than 60 stations, plus numerous power reductions, that somewhat reduced the congestion of the broadcast band, in preparation for implementation of the General Order 40 reallocation later that year.

== Background ==
Radio transmissions in the United States were originally regulated by the Department of Commerce, as authorized by the Radio Act of 1912. The first formal regulations governing broadcasts intended for the general public were adopted effective December 1, 1921. This initially established just two transmitting wavelengths — 360 meters (833 kHz) for "entertainment" broadcasts, and 485 meters (619 kHz) for "market news and weather reports". The number of broadcasting stations grew dramatically in 1922, reaching over 500 by the end of the year, and the government began making available additional frequencies. By November 1924 a band of frequencies, from 550 to 1500 kHz, had been established, with higher-powered stations, known as "Class B", assigned to the frequencies from 550 to 1070, while lower-powered "Class A" stations were assigned to 1080 to 1500. In 1926, the government's regulatory authority under the 1912 Radio Act was successfully challenged, and, for a chaotic period that lasted until early 1927, radio stations were free to use any frequency and power they chose, while the number of stations increased to 732. To rectify the matter, Congress passed the Radio Act of 1927, which was signed into law by President Calvin Coolidge on February 23, 1927. The Act adopted a standard that radio stations had to be shown to be "in the public interest, convenience, or necessity". The FRC started reducing the number of stations, beginning with eliminating "portable" stations.

Two technical issues limited the number of stations that could operate without interfering with each other. These issues were especially important at night, when a change in the ionosphere meant that radio signals traveled much greater distances. Most transmitters at this time were unable to precisely control their output frequencies, thus, signals from two stations operating on the same nominal frequency would combine to make a high-pitched "heterodyne" tone that interfered with the reception of both stations. Secondly, directional antennas would not be developed until the first installation at WFLA-WSUN in Tampa, Florida in early 1932, so there was no effective method for limiting signals in a given direction.

An additional requirement was that the station assignments meet the standards of the Davis Amendment, a provision attached to the March 28, 1928 reauthorization of the Radio Act of 1927, which mandated an "equality of radio broadcasting service" within the United States. It specified an "equitable allocation" among five regional zones, in addition to assignments proportional to population among the states within each zone.

== General Order 32 provisions ==
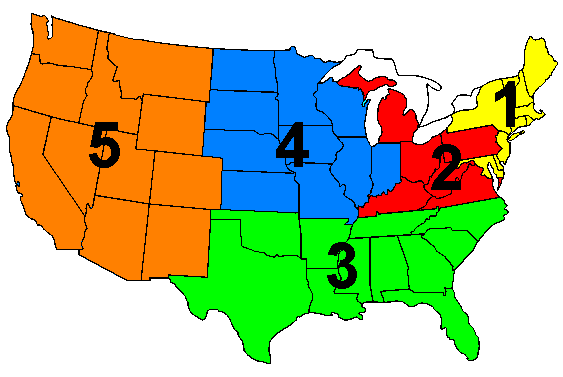
Five U.S. zones used to help ensure stations were equally allocated as required by the Davis Amendment

Following the establishment of the Federal Radio Commission, existing stations were initially issued a series of temporary authorizations, starting on May 3, 1927. The FRC conducted a review and census of the existing stations, then notified them that if they wished to remain on the air they had to file a formal license application by January 15, 1928, as the first step in determining whether they met the new "public interest, convenience, or necessity" standard.

General Order 32 was used to notify 164 stations that they had been identified as questionable in meeting this new standard. The following, dated May 25, 1928, was sent to these stations:

Dear Sir: Please note copy of attached Order No. 32 in which the commission has extended your present license for a period of 60 days. From an examination of your application for future license it does not find that public interest, convenience, or necessity would be served by granting it. The commission has fixed the date for hearing on this application on July 9, at 10 o'clock a.m. in its offices at Washington, D. C.
At this hearing, unless you can make an affirmative showing that public interest, convenience, or necessity will be served by the granting of your application, it will be finally denied.

The table below reviews the stations included in the General Order 32 notifications. The focus was on the most congested regions, especially around the Chicago and New York City areas. No stations from the sparsely populated Zone 3 were included. On the table, the Elimination Notes column records cases where stations were ultimately eliminated, either through deletion, by surrendering their licenses, or by consolidation with other stations. Stations with a blank Elimination Notes entry were found to meet the new "convenience, interest, and necessity" standard, and were relicensed.

General Order 32 notifications (May 25, 1928)
Zone	Call Sign	Location	Elimination Notes
Zone 1 (36 stations)	WIBS	Elizabeth, New Jersey	
Zone 1 (36 stations)	WBMS	Union City, New Jersey	
Zone 1 (36 stations)	WKBQ	New York, New York	
Zone 1 (36 stations)	WKBO	Jersey City, New Jersey	
Zone 1 (36 stations)	WSGH-WSDA	Brooklyn, New York	
Zone 1 (36 stations)	WWRL	Woodside, New York	
Zone 1 (36 stations)	WGCP	Newark, New Jersey	
Zone 1 (36 stations)	WLBX	Long Island City, New York	
Zone 1 (36 stations)	WLBH	Farmingdale, New York	
Zone 1 (36 stations)	WINR	Bay Shore, New York	
Zone 1 (36 stations)	WHPP	Englewood Cliffs, New Jersey	
Zone 1 (36 stations)	WLBM	Cambridge, Massachusetts	Surrendered license
Zone 1 (36 stations)	WRAH	Providence, Rhode Island	Deleted August 1, 1928 (failure to appear)
Zone 1 (36 stations)	WTRL	Midland Park, New Jersey	Deleted September 1, 1928
Zone 1 (36 stations)	WBES	Takoma Park, Maryland	
Zone 1 (36 stations)	WRES	Quincy, Massachusetts	Deleted August 1, 1928 (failure to appear)
Zone 1 (36 stations)	WAIT	Taunton, Massachusetts	Deleted August 1, 1928 (failure to appear)
Zone 1 (36 stations)	WIBI	Flushing, New York	Deleted August 1, 1928 (failure to appear) (WGOP)
Zone 1 (36 stations)	WRSC	Chelsea, Massachusetts	
Zone 1 (36 stations)	WCON	Danbury, Connecticut	Deleted August 1, 1928 (failure to appear)
Zone 1 (36 stations)	WPCH	Hoboken, New Jersey	
Zone 1 (36 stations)	WJBI	Red Bank, New Jersey	
Zone 1 (36 stations)	WOKT	Binghamton, New York	Deleted August 1, 1928 (failure to appear)
Zone 1 (36 stations)	WMRJ	Jamaica, New York	
Zone 1 (36 stations)	WAAT	Jersey City, New Jersey	
Zone 1 (36 stations)	WCOH	Greenville, New York	
Zone 1 (36 stations)	WBBC	Brooklyn, New York	
Zone 1 (36 stations)	WCGU	Coney Island, New York	
Zone 1 (36 stations)	WCLB	Long Beach, New York	
Zone 1 (36 stations)	WEVD	Woodhaven, New York	
Zone 1 (36 stations)	WGL	Secaucus, New Jersey	
Zone 1 (36 stations)	WMBQ	Brooklyn, New York	
Zone 1 (36 stations)	WCDA	Cliffside Park, New Jersey	
Zone 1 (36 stations)	WCOT	Providence, Rhode Island	Deleted September 1, 1928
Zone 1 (36 stations)	WCBM	Baltimore, Maryland	
Zone 1 (36 stations)	WMES	Boston, Massachusetts	
Zone 2 (31 stations)	WFJC	Akron, Ohio	
Zone 2 (31 stations)	WBRE	Wilkes-Barre, Pennsylvania	
Zone 2 (31 stations)	WKBN	Youngstown, Ohio	
Zone 2 (31 stations)	WLBY	Iron Mountain, Michigan	
Zone 2 (31 stations)	WMBJ	McKeesport, Pennsylvania	Deleted September 1, 1928 (technical violations)
Zone 2 (31 stations)	WJAY	Cleveland, Ohio	
Zone 2 (31 stations)	WJBK	Ypsilanti, Michigan	
Zone 2 (31 stations)	WIAD	Philadelphia, Pennsylvania	
Zone 2 (31 stations)	WABW	Wooster, Ohio	Deleted August 1, 1928 (failure to appear)
Zone 2 (31 stations)	WMBS	Lemoyne, Pennsylvania	
Zone 2 (31 stations)	WRAK	Escanaba, Michigan	
Zone 2 (31 stations)	WGM	Jeannette, Pennsylvania	Deleted August 1, 1928 (failure to appear)
Zone 2 (31 stations)	WMBW	Youngstown, Ohio	Consolidated with WKBN, Youngstown, Ohio, and deleted September 1929
Zone 2 (31 stations)	WSMK	Dayton, Ohio	
Zone 2 (31 stations)	WQBZ	Weirton, West Virginia	
Zone 2 (31 stations)	WBBP	Petoskey, Michigan	Deleted August 1, 1928 (failure to appear)
Zone 2 (31 stations)	WRAX	Philadelphia, Pennsylvania	
Zone 2 (31 stations)	WFBG	Altoona, Pennsylvania	
Zone 2 (31 stations)	WBBW	Norfolk, Virginia	
Zone 2 (31 stations)	WBBL	Richmond, Virginia	
Zone 2 (31 stations)	WTAZ	Chesterfield Hills, Virginia	
Zone 2 (31 stations)	WABF	Kingston, Pennsylvania	
Zone 2 (31 stations)	WFAN	Philadelphia, Pennsylvania	
Zone 2 (31 stations)	WEBE	Cambridge, Ohio	
Zone 2 (31 stations)	WFKD	Frankford, Pennsylvania	
Zone 2 (31 stations)	WBMH	Detroit, Michigan	
Zone 2 (31 stations)	WMBG	Richmond, Virginia	
Zone 2 (31 stations)	WKBZ	Ludington, Michigan	
Zone 2 (31 stations)	WHBC	Canton, Ohio	
Zone 2 (31 stations)	WABY	Philadelphia, Pennsylvania	
Zone 2 (31 stations)	WFBE	Cincinnati, Ohio	
Zone 4 (91 stations)	WLBO	Galesburg, Illinois	Deleted August 1, 1928 (failure to appear) (later relicensed).
Zone 4 (91 stations)	WJBL	Decatur, Illinois	
Zone 4 (91 stations)	WMBB-WOK	Homewood, Illinois	Deleted September 1, 1928
Zone 4 (91 stations)	WDZ	Tuscola, Illinois	
Zone 4 (91 stations)	WCAZ	Carthage, Illinois	
Zone 4 (91 stations)	WLIB	Chicago, Illinois	Consolidated with WGN, Chicago, Illinois
Zone 4 (91 stations)	WJAK	Kokomo, Indiana	
Zone 4 (91 stations)	WLBC	Muncie, Indiana	
Zone 4 (91 stations)	WCBS	Springfield, Illinois	
Zone 4 (91 stations)	WLBI	Wenona, Illinois	Deleted August 1, 1928 (failure to appear)
Zone 4 (91 stations)	WFBZ	Galesburg, Illinois	Deleted August 1, 1928 (failure to appear)
Zone 4 (91 stations)	WBAO	Decatur, Illinois	Consolidated with WJBL, Decatur, Illinois
Zone 4 (91 stations)	WTAD	Quincy, Illinois	
Zone 4 (91 stations)	WBCN	Chicago, Illinois	Consolidated with WENR, Chicago, Illinois
Zone 4 (91 stations)	WKBV	Brookville, Indiana	
Zone 4 (91 stations)	WLBT	Crown Point, Indiana	Deleted August 1, 1928 (failure to appear)
Zone 4 (91 stations)	WNBA	Forest Park, Illinois	Deleted September 1, 1928
Zone 4 (91 stations)	WHBF	Rock Island, Illinois	
Zone 4 (91 stations)	WEHS	Evanston, Illinois	
Zone 4 (91 stations)	WTAS	Elgin, Illinois	
Zone 4 (91 stations)	WEBQ	Harrisburg, Illinois	
Zone 4 (91 stations)	WJBA	Joliet, Illinois	Deleted September 1, 1928
Zone 4 (91 stations)	WLBQ	Atwood, Illinois	Deleted August 1, 1928 (failure to appear)
Zone 4 (91 stations)	WTAX	Streator, Illinois	
Zone 4 (91 stations)	KFKX	Chicago, Illinois	Consolidated with KYW, Chicago, Illinois
Zone 4 (91 stations)	WEDC	Chicago, Illinois	
Zone 4 (91 stations)	WSBC	Chicago, Illinois	
Zone 4 (91 stations)	WPEP	Waukegan, Illinois	Deleted August 1, 1928 (failure to appear) Also September 1, 1928
Zone 4 (91 stations)	WHFC	Chicago, Illinois	
Zone 4 (91 stations)	WRAM	Galesburg, Illinois	Deleted August 1, 1928 (failure to appear)
Zone 4 (91 stations)	WKBB	Joliet, Illinois	Consolidated with WCLS, Joliet, Illinois (later relicensed)
Zone 4 (91 stations)	WMBD	Peoria Heights, Illinois	
Zone 4 (91 stations)	WKBS	Galesburg, Illinois	
Zone 4 (91 stations)	WJBC	La Salle, Illinois	
Zone 4 (91 stations)	WKBI	Chicago, Illinois	
Zone 4 (91 stations)	WCLS	Joliet, Illinois	
Zone 4 (91 stations)	WFKB	Chicago, Illinois	Deleted August 1, 1928 (failure to appear)
Zone 4 (91 stations)	WLTS	Chicago, Illinois	Deleted August 1, 1928 (failure to appear)
Zone 4 (91 stations)	WQJ	Chicago, Illinois	Consolidated with WMAQ, Chicago, Illinois
Zone 4 (91 stations)	WSAX	Chicago, Illinois	Surrendered license
Zone 4 (91 stations)	WJBZ	Chicago Heights, Illinois	Deleted August 1, 1928 (failure to appear)
Zone 4 (91 stations)	WCRW	Chicago, Illinois	
Zone 4 (91 stations)	WRAF	La Porte, Indiana	
Zone 4 (91 stations)	WWAE	Hammond, Indiana	
Zone 4 (91 stations)	KGFB	Iowa City, Iowa	Deleted August 1, 1928 (failure to appear)
Zone 4 (91 stations)	KFHL	Oskaloosa, Iowa	Deleted August 1, 1928 (failure to appear)
Zone 4 (91 stations)	KPNP	Muscatine, Iowa	Deleted August 1, 1928 (failure to appear)
Zone 4 (91 stations)	KICK	Red Oak, Iowa	
Zone 4 (91 stations)	KFVG	Independence, Kansas	
Zone 4 (91 stations)	WMBE	White Bear Lake, Minnesota	Deleted August 1, 1928 (failure to appear)
Zone 4 (91 stations)	KFDZ	Minneapolis, Minnesota	Deleted August 1, 1928 (failure to appear)
Zone 4 (91 stations)	KGHC	Slayton, Minnesota	Deleted August 1, 1928 (failure to appear)
Zone 4 (91 stations)	WMAY	St. Louis, Missouri	
Zone 4 (91 stations)	KWKC	Kansas City, Missouri	
Zone 4 (91 stations)	WCWK	Fort Wayne, Indiana	
Zone 4 (91 stations)	KFMR	Sioux City, Iowa	Deleted August 1, 1928 (failure to appear)
Zone 4 (91 stations)	KGCA	Decorah, Iowa	
Zone 4 (91 stations)	KWCR	Cedar Rapids, Iowa	
Zone 4 (91 stations)	WIAS	Ottumwa, Iowa	
Zone 4 (91 stations)	KWUC	Le Mars, Iowa	Deleted September 1, 1928
Zone 4 (91 stations)	KGCN	Concordia, Kansas	
Zone 4 (91 stations)	KGEQ	Minneapolis, Minnesota	Deleted August 1, 1928 (failure to appear)
Zone 4 (91 stations)	WFAM	St. Cloud, Minnesota	Deleted August 1, 1928 (failure to appear)
Zone 4 (91 stations)	KFQA	St. Louis, Missouri	Deleted September 1, 1928 (Later consolidated with KMOX, St. Louis, Missouri)
Zone 4 (91 stations)	KFWF	St. Louis, Missouri	
Zone 4 (91 stations)	KGBX	St. Joseph, Missouri	
Zone 4 (91 stations)	KFOX	Omaha, Nebraska	Deleted August 1, 1928 (failure to appear)
Zone 4 (91 stations)	KGBY	Columbus, Nebraska	Consolidated with KGBZ, York, Nebraska
Zone 4 (91 stations)	KGCH	Wayne, Nebraska	Consolidated with KGBZ, York, Nebraska
Zone 4 (91 stations)	KGDW	Humboldt, Nebraska	Consolidated with KGBZ, York, Nebraska
Zone 4 (91 stations)	KGBZ	York, Nebraska	
Zone 4 (91 stations)	KGCR	Brookings, South Dakota	
Zone 4 (91 stations)	KGDA	Dell Rapids, South Dakota	
Zone 4 (91 stations)	WKBH	La Crosse, Wisconsin	
Zone 4 (91 stations)	WIBU	Poynette, Wisconsin	
Zone 4 (91 stations)	WIBA	Madison, Wisconsin	
Zone 4 (91 stations)	WCLO	Kenosha, Wisconsin	
Zone 4 (91 stations)	WAIZ	Appleton, Wisconsin	Deleted September 1, 1928
Zone 4 (91 stations)	KGES	Central City, Nebraska	Consolidated with KGBZ, York, Nebraska
Zone 4 (91 stations)	KGFW	Ravenna, Nebraska	
Zone 4 (91 stations)	KGEO	Grand Island, Nebraska	Consolidated with KGBZ, York, Nebraska
Zone 4 (91 stations)	WNAL	Omaha, Nebraska	Deleted September 1, 1928
Zone 4 (91 stations)	KDLR	Devils Lake, North Dakota	
Zone 4 (91 stations)	KGDY	Oldham, South Dakota	Deleted August 1, 1928 (failure to appear)
Zone 4 (91 stations)	WKDR	South Kenosha, Wisconsin	Deleted August 1, 1928 (failure to appear)
Zone 4 (91 stations)	WEBW	Beloit, Wisconsin	
Zone 4 (91 stations)	KFIZ	Fond du Lac, Wisconsin	Deleted August 1, 1928 (failure to appear) (later reinstated)
Zone 4 (91 stations)	WHBY	West de Pere, Wisconsin	
Zone 4 (91 stations)	WOMT	Manitowoc, Wisconsin	
Zone 4 (91 stations)	WGWB	Milwaukee, Wisconsin	Consolidated with WISN, Milwaukee Wisconsin and deleted September 1929
Zone 4 (91 stations)	KGFN	Aneta, North Dakota	Deleted August 1, 1928 (failure to appear)
Zone 5 (5 stations)	KFPR	Los Angeles, California	Deleted August 1, 1928 (failure to appear)
Zone 5 (5 stations)	KFUS	Oakland, California	Deleted August 1, 1928 (failure to appear)
Zone 5 (5 stations)	KGDM	Stockton, California	
Zone 5 (5 stations)	KOOS	Marshfield, Oregon	Surrendered license
Zone 5 (5 stations)	KFUT	Salt Lake City, Utah	Deleted August 1, 1928 (failure to appear)

=== Effects ===
Most of the challenged stations submitted documentation or made presentations supporting their relicensing, and a majority were approved, although often with a power reduction. However, on July 27 the FRC announced that 36 stations had failed to present justifications supporting their applications, thus would be deleted as of August 1, 1928. In addition, four stations voluntarily surrendered their licenses.

Through the end of August, the FRC announced additional stations that would be deleted, and those which would be relicensed. Stations designated for September 1 deletions included WCOT, WNBA, WJBA, WPEP and WTRL, plus KWUC, WAIZ and WNAL. The deletion of KFQA in St. Louis Missouri was reported, although it was later consolidated with KMOX. A final report stated that WMBB-WOK would be deleted, while WQJ, WBCN, WLIB, KFKX, WGWB, WMBW, WBAO, WCLS, WLBO and five Nebraska stations were being consolidated with other stations. One additional station, WMBJ, was deleted due to technical violations.

According to the FRC, a total of 62 stations were eliminated as a result of General Order 32, with 81 surviving, although many of the latter were reduced in power or moved to less desirable frequencies. Educational stations fared particularly poorly. They were usually required to share frequencies with commercial stations and operate only during the daytime, which was considered of limited value for adult education. The deleted stations were mostly small ones with limited financial backing. One notable exception was a Chicago-area station, WMBB-WOK. This station was primarily owned by the American Bond and Mortgage Company, which unsuccessfully challenged its elimination in the federal courts.

With the number of stations now somewhat reduced, the FRC's next major step was implementation of General Order 40 on November 11, 1928, which was a wide-sweeping reallocation of station assignments.

== See also ==
- North American Regional Broadcasting Agreement
- Federal Radio Commission
