= Fox Sports Net Chicago =

Defunct regional sports network based in Chicago

- FSN Chicago logo, used from 2004 to 2006.
- Country: United States
- Broadcast area: Chicago metropolitan area (via cable); Nationwide (via satellite)
- Network: SportsChannel America (1987–1998); Fox Sports Net (1998–2006)
- Headquarters: Chicago (general offices); Bethpage, New York (master control)

Programming
- Language: English
- Picture format: 480i (SDTV)

Ownership
- Owner: Jerry Reinsdorf, Eddie Einhorn and Fred Eychaner (1982–1983); Cablevision (1983–2006); News Corporation (partial ownership, 1997–2005)

History
- Launched: April 1982; 44 years ago
- Closed: June 23, 2006; 20 years ago
- Replaced by: NBC Sports Chicago
- Former names: SportsVision Chicago (1982–1989); SportsChannel Chicago (1989–1998); Fox Sports Chicago (1998–1999); Fox Sports Net Chicago (1999–2004)

Fox Sports Net Chicago (often branded as FSN Chicago) was an American regional sports network that was headquartered in Chicago, Illinois and was owned by Cablevision for most of its history (from 1987 to 2005). News Corporation acquired a minority ownership interest in the network in 1997, which Cablevision bought out in 2005. The network was affiliated with SportsChannel from 1987 to 1997, when it became an affiliate of Fox Sports Net.

The network carried games from most of the Chicago area's major league sports teams including the Chicago Cubs and Chicago White Sox Major League Baseball franchises; the NHL's Chicago Blackhawks; the NBA's Chicago Bulls; the Chicago Fire of Major League Soccer; and the Arena Football League's Chicago Rush. The network also aired local and national collegiate sports, including teams sourced from its sister network Fox Sports Detroit.

== History ==
=== Early history ===
SportsChannel Chicago was first launched in 1981 when Cablevision obtained rights to 81 Chicago White Sox homes games for the 1981 season. Shortly after another deal was made to carry sporting events from Notre Dame both on SportsChannel Chicago and New York.

The agreement with Cablevision was supposed to be a two-year deal. However, the White Sox's new owners Jerry Reinsdorf and Eddie Einhorn launched a new cable service named SportsVision which also contracted with ONTV to provide the games as an over-the-air premium service, since many parts of Chicago still were not wired for cable television service. SportsVision also formed a partnership with the Blackhawks, Bulls and Sting to bring their games to the new network as well. The move of the White Sox games from SportsChannel led to Cablevision filing a breach of contract lawsuit. SportsChannel Chicago would disappear from channel lineups, but not permanently.

Due to the fact that Chicago was one of the last major U.S. cities where cable television was still not widely available, SportsVision initially operated as an over-the-air subscription service. They broadcast over WPWR each weeknight and weekend. Viewers were required to purchase a set-top converter and pay a monthly fee to view the telecasts, which included Bulls, White Sox, and Blackhawks games, as well as college sports events of local interest. Some sports telecasts were also simulcast on ONTV, a co-owned subscription service that broadcast part-time over WSNS-TV (channel 44). The Bulls and White Sox continued to broadcast a number of games on free broadcast television locally, while the Blackhawks moved all of their game broadcasts over to SportsVision, ending a longstanding partnership with WSNS. After the move, some set-top converters which were sold as part of ONTV and SportsVision subscriptions, began incorporating a switch to allow subscribers to tune to either ONTV or SportsVision. By 1984, White Sox games began airing on ONTV as well.

The decision to move most of the White Sox broadcasts to paid television led longtime announcer Harry Caray to become the play-by-play voice of the rival Chicago Cubs. He did this due to the limited exposure that the White Sox would experience as a result of having the majority of games on a medium that would limit the reach of the team's televised game broadcasts. Chicago was, until 2019, one of the very few television markets in the United States whose baseball teams made a substantial percentage of their games available over-the-air. Until the mid-1990s, the Cubs still televised all of their games that were not aired nationally on the major broadcast networks (ABC, NBC, CBS) over WGN-TV (channel 9), and a regional network of television stations throughout parts of the Midwest.

=== Affiliation with SportsChannel and Fox Sports Net ===
The WPWR-SportsVision partnership struggled by late 1983 and as a result, the channel was sold to Cablevision and the Washington Post (which by this time had become a partner in SportsChannel). SportsVision immediately affiliated with SportsChannel and was converted into a basic cable service by 1986. By 1988, the Post had sold its share in SportVision (and the other SportsChannel networks) and NBC became a new partner gaining 50% ownership of the network. On March 1, 1989, the channel relaunched as SportsChannel Chicago, returning the name after over seven years. The network began broadcasting 24 hours a day in 1991. Also that year, Tele-Communications Inc. (TCI) purchased a 25% share in SportsChannel Chicago, with the remaining 75% split evenly between Cablevision and NBC. As part of this transaction, TCI also signed a long-term deal to carry the network on its cable systems.

On June 30, 1997, News Corporation and Liberty Media—which had created a new group of regional sports networks known as Fox Sports Net in November 1996—purchased a 40% interest in Cablevision's sports properties. Properties included the SportsChannel America networks, Madison Square Garden, and the arena's professional sports franchise tenants, the New York Knicks and New York Rangers.

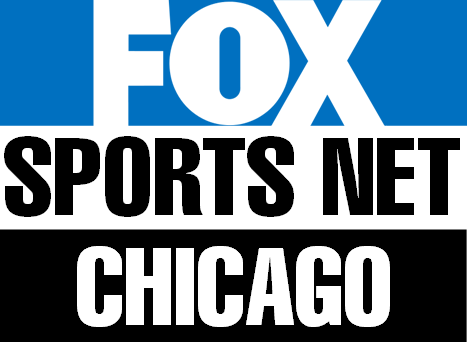
Fox Sports Net Chicago logo, used from 2000 to 2004.

Following the purchase, SportsChannel Chicago abruptly canceled its daily sports news program The SportsChannel Report on August 10, resulting in the layoffs of ten staff members (including the program's veteran anchors Jim Blaney, Steve Kashul and Dyrol Joyner). That October, the channel launched Fox Sports Tonight, a similarly formatted sports news program focusing on local sports, intended to complement Fox Sports Net's national program Fox Sports News. During that period, the channel relocated its production and office facilities to a new facility in the Apparel Center, at 350 North Orleans Street in the Near North Side area.

The new joint venture formed between News Corporation, Cablevision and Liberty Media, National Sports Partners, began a gradual rebranding of the SportsChannel networks that Cablevision had previously controlled into owned-and-operated outlets of Fox Sports Net. As a result, SportsChannel Chicago was rebranded as Fox Sports Chicago in January 1998. The channel was then rebranded as Fox Sports Net Chicago in 2000, as part of a collective brand modification of the FSN networks under the "Fox Sports Net" banner.

Fox Sports Tonight later evolved into the Chicago Sports Report in 2001, as part of a groupwide expansion of regional news programs across the Fox Sports Networks to complement the National Sports Report. Around that time, Fox Sports Net Chicago also began serving as the production and origination hub for the Ohio Sports Report and Bay Area Sports Report news programs (all of which were 50% owned by Cablevision through its Rainbow Sports subsidiary) for sister networks Fox Sports Ohio and Fox Sports Net Bay Area. In 2004, the channel shortened its name to FSN Chicago, through the networks' de-emphasis of the "Fox Sports Net" brand.

=== Loss of broadcast rights and decline ===
In December 2003, Reinsdorf, Bill Wirtz and the Tribune Company—the owners of the Bulls, White Sox, Blackhawks and Cubs respectively—decided to end their cable television agreement with FSN Chicago. This stripped the network of broadcast rights to all of the professional sports teams in the Chicago area. All three decided to enter into a partnership with Comcast to form a new regional sports network, Comcast SportsNet Chicago, which launched on October 1, 2004. The move led many cable and satellite providers in northeastern Illinois and northwest Indiana to drop FSN Chicago. Without any local professional sports coverage remaining, FSN Chicago was left with national programming distributed by Fox Sports Net. The events from some minor local and semi-professional teams and Midwestern outdoors programs had limited interest to Chicago area viewers.

In February 2005, Cablevision acquired full ownership of Fox Sports Chicago and FSN New York, and a 50% interest in Fox Sports New England (with Comcast retaining its existing 50% stake) in an asset swap that also involved the sale of News Corporation's interest in Madison Square Garden and the arena's NBA and NHL team tenants in exchange for Cablevision's interest in FSN Ohio and FSN Florida.

FSN Chicago ceased operations on June 23, 2006; Comcast SportsNet Chicago subsequently moved its operations into the Orleans Street facility formerly occupied by FSN Chicago, and acquired the rights to broadcast FSN's nationally distributed programs. The set formerly used by the Chicago Sports Report was purchased by NBC affiliate WREX-TV in Rockford for use as the station's main news set. The Orleans Street facility had since also become the homebase of the Chicago Sun-Times.
