= WMBB-WOK =

Illinois radio station (1927–1928)

WMBB-WOK was a high-powered radio station located in Homewood, Illinois, United States, a suburb of Chicago. It was deleted by the Federal Radio Commission (FRC) on September 1, 1928, as part of its implementation of General Order 32, which was used to reduce of the number of U.S. radio stations.

WMBB-WOK's owners responded with a series of court challenges to have the license reinstated, which lasted until 1932, but were all unsuccessful. These cases helped to establish the legitimacy of the Radio Act of 1927 and its Davis Amendment provisions, as well as the establishment of the FRC and its authority to regulate radio.

== History ==
=== WCBZ / WOK ===
WOK was first licensed, as WCBZ, in April 1924 to the Coppotelli Brothers Music House in Chicago Heights, Illinois, for operation on 1210 kHz with a 50 watt transmitter. Its call sign was randomly assigned from a sequential roster of available call letters.

In 1925 the station was taken over by the Neutrowound Radio Manufacturing Company, which changed the frequency to 1380 kHz, moved the station from Chicago Heights to Homewood, Illinois, changed the call letters from WCBZ to WOK, and increased the transmitter power to 5,000 watts. In April 1927, ownership was transferred to Trianon, Inc.

=== WMBB ===
WMBB was first licensed on April 3, 1925, to the Trianon Ball Room (Woodlawn Theatre Company) in Chicago for 100 watts on 1200 kHz. The call letters reflected the company's "World's Most Beautiful Ballroom" slogan. Ownership was changed on May 25 to the American Bond & Mortgage Company.

=== Consolidation as WMBB-WOK ===
Following the establishment of the Federal Radio Commission (FRC), existing stations were initially issued a series of temporary authorizations starting on May 3, 1927. Later that year, both WMBB and WOK were assigned to 1190 kHz on a timesharing basis, still as separate stations, but with close cooperation. They were formally combined into a single entity on November 1, 1927, when WOK was merged with WMBB, now operating under the control of American Bond & Mortgage, using a dual call sign of WMBB-WOK. The combined station used WOK's 5,000 watt Homewood transmitter, a ten-fold increase for American Bond & Mortgage compared with WMBB's previous operation as a separate station with a 500 watt transmitter.

=== Deletion and subsequent legal battles ===
The FRC conducted a review of existing stations, and notified them that if they wished to remain on the air they had to file a formal license application by January 15, 1928, as the first step in determining whether they met the new "public interest, convenience, or necessity" standard. The FRC's General Order 32, issued on May 25, 1928, notified 164 stations, including WMBB-WOK, that they had been identified as questionable in meeting this new standard. Although a majority of the contacted stations survived their reviews and received licenses, WMBB-WOK's application was found to be insufficient, and it was announced that the station was deleted effective September 1, 1928.

WMBB-WOK's owners turned to the federal courts in a series of unsuccessful attempts to have the station license restored. However, on November 5, 1929, the United States District Court for the Northern District of Illinois, Eastern Division, issued an injunction prohibiting the station from further operations. An attempt to get the original court to reverse its decision was unsuccessful, as was an appeal filed with the United States Circuit Court of Appeals for the Seventh Circuit. The appeals court attempted to get the U.S. Supreme Court to rule on "six questions of law", but the Supreme Court declined getting involved.

In 1932, the Supreme Court initially agreed to take up a group of related cases, including WMBB-WOK's, but later decided that the issues were best handled by the lower courts. Thus, WMBB-WOK was never able to receive permission to return to broadcasting.
