= Wally Phillips =

American radio personality (1925–2008)

- Born: July 7, 1925; Portsmouth, Ohio, United States
- Died: March 26, 2008 (aged 82); Naples, Florida, U.S.
- Presenting career
- Stations: WGN, Chicago, Illinois
- Country: United States

Walter Phillips (July 7, 1925 – March 26, 2008) was an American radio personality best known for hosting WGN's morning radio show from Chicago for 21 years from January 1965 until July 1986, and was number one in the morning slot from 1968 until he left for an afternoon radio slot in 1986.

A pioneer of the radio call-in talk show format, Phillips frequently used a format now banned by the FCC: putting people on the air without their knowledge.

== Early life ==
Phillips was born in Portsmouth, Ohio. Six years later, after his father's death from tuberculosis, his family (including three siblings) moved to Cincinnati. Phillips later dropped out of high school to join the United States Army Air Forces during World War II, but he ended up in Georgia in a tow target squadron assigned to fly practice targets for fighter pilots and anti-aircraft artillery.

After the end of World War II, he attended drama school for a while and then became a disc jockey in Grand Rapids, Michigan. After a year of the beginning of his DJ career, he returned to Cincinnati.

== Radio career ==
=== Cincinnati ===
Phillips expanded his career as a radio personality at WLW in Cincinnati where he established his call-in format and his trademark style of remixing prerecorded interviews as a comedy piece. He was eventually fired after he inserted a phony item into a newscast. Discussing this piece in a 1976 interview with the Chicago Tribune, Phillips said,

"I wrote, 'All members of infantry company so-and-so report immediately to your draft board,' and I described an insurrection in some phony country. He read it on the air. Hell, they even had the FBI all over the station."

=== Chicago ===
Later, Phillips moved to Chicago, Illinois along with staff announcer, and future Bozo the Clown star, Bob Bell. The two started at WGN (AM) in 1956 after being introduced as "comedians from Cincinnati".

His WGN morning show was consistently top-rated in Chicago, and led to his being labeled "the king of morning radio". At the height of his popularity, Phillips attracted nearly 1.5 million listeners, a now unheard-of 50% market share.

== Innovations ==
Phillips was one of the first broadcasters to routinely use humorous and offbeat phone calls in his show, including prank phone calls. Sometimes, he called random payphones to see who would answer. For example, he called a pet cemetery to arrange a funeral for his mouse, and on another occasion he tracked down Benjamin Gingiss, founder of Gingiss Formal Wear, while the man was on vacation in the Bahamas to ask him where the fire extinguishers were kept in the store.

Another time, Phillips called Ipanema, a neighborhood located on the southern region of the city of Rio de Janeiro, Brazil, and inquired whether there were any women there who were "tall and tan and young and lovely". He tried to order pizza from Rome and even tried to return a natural Christmas tree weeks into the new year because it had browned and lost all its needles. On one occasion, he managed to obtain Luciano Pavarotti's hotel room number, and called to ask if the singer would give Phillips opera lessons and "teach [Phillips] to sing flat, like you do."

Phillips was the first to offer a $1 million prize to listeners—as a part one of his promotions in which he would debunk self-proclaimed psychics on the air. Listeners were invited to guess what celebrity name was written inside "Wally's Black Box". No one ever successfully guessed the name. He eventually revealed the note bearing the name of Jean Rogers, a movie heroine Phillips admired for her role as Dale Arden in several Flash Gordon film serials.

Another unique aspect of Phillips' show was a large library of sound bites, each just a few seconds in length, which could be played on short notice in response to something that was said. A mundane example would be an announcement by Phillips followed by Groucho Marx's voice (from a line in Duck Soup) saying, "Make a note of that!" Instead of using carts or reels, Phillips' engineers found it more convenient to cut a disk with a transcription lathe to keep everything at the ready. WGN was still using the devices strictly for the Phillips show as late as 1985, costing the station more than $20,000 yearly.

== Retirement ==
In 1998, he retired from WGN radio after 42 years, twelve years after giving up the morning show where he was succeeded by Bob Collins, who continued the format and the high ratings. Phillips then hosted a two-hour Saturday morning radio show on WAIT in Crystal Lake, Illinois for some years afterward.

"Wally Phillips was the biggest, most successful, most influential local radio broadcaster in Chicago history. He was the number one local radio personality in the United States."

— Bruce DuMont, President of the Museum of Broadcast Communications"

Phillips was inducted into the National Radio Hall of Fame, in the Museum of Broadcast Communications in 1993 and into the National Association of Broadcasters Hall of Fame in 1997, marking his 50th year in radio.

On October 21, 2004, the street corner of Rush Street and Delaware Street in Chicago was designated as Honorary Wally Phillips Way.

== Personal life ==
In 1969, Wally Phillips founded the Neediest Kids Fund, which has since raised $35 million for charity.

Phillips was married three times – all to the same woman, Barbara. He had two daughters Holly and Jennifer, and a son, Todd.

He died in Naples, Florida on March 26, 2008, after suffering from Alzheimer's disease for the previous five years.
