= LesBiGay Radio =

Radio program in Chicago

- Running time: 2 hours
- Country of origin: United States
- Home station: WSBC and WCFJ
- Hosted by: Alan Amberg; Amy Matheny; David Cottrell; Mary Morten; Rick Karlin; Alexandra Billings
- Created by: Alan Amberg
- Original release: June 1994 – April 27, 2001

LesBiGay Radio was a radio show catering to the LGBT population of Chicago, Illinois. A contraction of lesbian, bisexual, and gay, the radio program was founded in June 1994 by Alan Amberg, and broadcast until April 2001, just shy of its 7th anniversary.

It was America's only daily show for the LGBT community, with 520 hours broadcast a year.

The show was inducted into the Chicago LGBT Hall of Fame in 1998.

== History ==
LesBiGay Radio was first announced to the public in the Chicago Tribune on May 22, 1994. It first aired in June, 1994 on WCBR, broadcasting primarily to the North Side due to the local gay population mostly being in that region. It was founded in response to a lack of radio shows that appealed to the broad Chicago LGBTQ+ community. It billed itself as being for “gays, lesbians, bisexuals, transgenders and the people who love us."

The show moved to WNDZ to get a morning commute slot. Following this, it gained an evening slot for those commuting back home, with North Side listeners tuning in on WSBC and South Side listeners tuning in on WCFJ.

In March 1996, the show became the first openly gay business to post billboards. It placed them in six locations across the North Side to advertise the show. It also posted advertisements on radio and television and sponsored various community events, and hosted a toll-free phone line.

The show only began to break even in 1997, getting its start with a $100,000 inheritance from the late gay activist Jerry Cohen. It derived much of its income from advertisements and event tickets. It was able to afford five full-time staff.

The radio show had its final show on April 27, 2001, just before its 7th anniversary. It was purchased by the Windy City Media Group, evolving into Windy City Radio Sunday nights on WCKG. This then became the Windy City Queercast in 2006, hosted by Matheny, Billings, among others. This show lasted until May, 2015.

== Programming ==
The show was hosted by its founder, Alan Amberg, as well as Amy Matheny, David Cottrell, Mary Morten, Rick Karlin, and Alexandra Billings.

The show started with a two-hour time slot but according to the Chicago Tribune, it eventually evolved into a three-hour time slot each weekday morning. The show had songs that were followed by announcements of which openly gay artists, producers, or even audio engineers were working on it. It interviewed local community members, such as those in the Northwestern University gay student group. The show discussed LGBTQ+ news, upcoming events, healthcare issues, unique websites, volunteer opportunities, and talk show segments on parenting and dating.

According to The Washington Post, the show was sponsored by Ford, Citibank, and Budweiser.

The program's final show consisted of tributes to the staff, with callers reporting on how the show has affected them. The show reportedly had over 10,000 visitors to its website.

== Reception ==
The show was widely received among Chicago's LGBTQ+ community, featuring members of the local community. Representatives for the radio show often appeared at local events, to a positive reception. Additionally, listeners were reported across 35 Chicago zip codes and at least three total states.

It was inducted into the Chicago LGBT Hall of Fame in 1998.

The show won multiple awards, including the 1999 GLAAD Media Award in Radio as well as the 1999 Chicago Washington Award/Human Relations. It won an Honorable Mention for the 1999 Chicago AIR Award and was nominated for the 2000 GLAAD Media Award in Radio and for an award from the Gay/Lesbian Music Awards.
