= WPWR-TV =

Television station in Gary, Indiana

- Gary, Indiana; Chicago, Illinois; United States
- City: Gary, Indiana
- Channels: Digital: 24 (UHF), shared with WFLD; Virtual: 50
- Branding: Fox Chicago Plus

Programming
- Affiliations: 50.1: Independent with MyNetworkTV

Ownership
- Owner: Fox Television Stations, LLC
- Sister stations: WFLD

History
- First air date: April 4, 1982
- Former channel numbers: Analog: 60 (UHF, 1982–1987), 50 (UHF, 1987–2009); Digital: 51 (UHF, 2002–2018), 31 (UHF, 2018–2019)
- Former affiliations: Independent (1982–1995); UPN (1995–2006); FoxBox/4Kids TV (secondary, 2003–2008); The CW (2016–2019)
- Call sign meaning: "Power"

Technical information
- Licensing authority: FCC
- Facility ID: 48772
- ERP: 435.5 kW (STA); 1,000 kW (CP)
- HAAT: 509.5 m (1,672 ft) (STA); 520 m (1,706 ft) (CP)
- Transmitter coordinates: 41°52′44.1″N 87°38′10.2″W

Links
- Public license information: Public file; LMS
- Website: www.fox32chicago.com/fox-chicago-plus

WPWR-TV (channel 50), branded as Fox Chicago Plus, is a television station licensed to Gary, Indiana, United States, serving the Chicago area. It is programmed primarily as an independent station, but maintains a secondary affiliation with MyNetworkTV. WPWR-TV is owned by Fox Television Stations alongside WFLD (channel 32); the stations share studios on North Michigan Avenue in the Chicago Loop and transmitter facilities atop the Willis Tower.

WPWR-TV is one of two commercial television stations in the Chicago market to be licensed in Indiana (alongside WJYS [channel 62] in Hammond). WPWR-TV sold its spectrum space in the Federal Communications Commission (FCC)'s incentive auction, and began channel-sharing with WFLD on June 11, 2018.

== History ==
=== As an independent station (1982–1995) ===
==== Early years with WBBS-TV ====
The station first signed on the air on April 4, 1982, as a shared station operation broadcasting on UHF channel 60, split between English-language WPWR-TV and Spanish-language WBBS-TV. The shared station was the result of a shared-time agreement between two of the three applicants vying for the channel: HATCO-60—owned by Chicago Hispanic marketing agency owner Marcelino Miyares alongside other partners and the members of a competing applicant, Aurora-Chicago Telecasters—and Metrowest Corporation—owned by Fred Eychaner, which would later become Newsweb Corporation. Both stations operated as independents in their respective languages. WPWR-TV's city of license was Aurora, while WBBS-TV was licensed to West Chicago; each of them operated from the same transmitter on the Sears Tower.

A large percentage of WPWR's programming schedule was occupied by SportsVision, a new pay television service which Eychaner had developed through a deal with Chicago White Sox co-owners Jerry Reinsdorf and Eddie Einhorn. To receive the service, viewers had to rent a set-top converter and pay a monthly fee in order to view SportsVision's event telecasts, involving the Chicago sports teams. However, SportsVision was not a success and transitioned into a cable channel in January 1983, eventually evolving into SportsChannel Chicago.

With SportsVision removed from its schedule, Eychaner began acquiring public domain movies to air on weekends and a few shows that were still owned by fellow independent station WSNS-TV (channel 44, now a Telemundo owned-and-operated station), which began carrying the ONTV subscription entertainment service on a full-time basis in the fall of 1982. These programs ran weekdays from 6 to 8 a.m. and from 5 to 7 p.m., as well as from 6 a.m. to 7 p.m. on weekends; public domain movies also ran during the overnight hours when WBBS signed off for the night. WPWR also chose to compete with rival independent WCIU-TV (channel 26)'s locally produced business news service, Stock Market Observer, by running national business programming from the Financial News Network each weekday from 8 a.m. to 5 p.m. The FNN simulcast was dropped in January 1984, at which time the station added several classic sitcoms from the early to mid-1950s and older cartoons to its schedule. In 1984, more recognizable classic sitcoms and newer barter cartoons were mixed into the schedule.

Meanwhile, HATCO-60's WBBS-TV programmed channel 60 daily from 7 p.m. to 2:30 a.m., as the second television station for Chicago's Hispanic community. WBBS-TV programming included telenovelas and movies, as well as locally produced shows, such as the popular music video program Imagen, hosted by local Spanish-language television personality (and now media executive) Rey Mena and Vivianne Plazas. One of the notable events for WBBS occurred in 1983, when the station introduced the Latin teen pop group Menudo (which included a young Ricky Martin) to Chicago's Latino community.

==== Move to channel 50 ====
Eychaner showed an interest quickly in acquiring another license to make WPWR a full-time station. In Gary, Indiana, Great Lakes Broadcasting—formerly known as GWWX-TV—had held a construction permit since 1981 to build WDAI, a television station on channel 56. When it applied for the station in 1979, GWWX-TV had proposed part-time subscription television operation, as well as news and information for the African American community. A technical problem, however, impeded a key part of GWWX's plans. GWWX was the second channel 56 permitholder to seek approval to place the station on the Sears Tower. The first one was Greater Media Television, which had held the construction permit for WGMI and was denied in its plan to locate the facility there in 1968 because the Sears Tower site did not meet spacing requirements to two allocations in southeast Wisconsin: channel 49 at Racine and channel 55 at Kenosha. Additionally, channels 56 and 60 could not co-exist at the same site per channel spacing rules. As such, GWWX amended its application to specify a tower in Park Forest, Illinois, enabling the FCC to grant the application in November 1981.

By 1984, WDAI was still unbuilt; the other allocation to Gary, noncommercial channel 50, was also silent. Public outlet WCAE had folded in 1983 because the Lake Central School Corporation could no longer support the station. The license had been transferred to Northwest Indiana Public Broadcasting, which was attempting to raise funds to rebuild channel 50 from a newer, more centrally located facility in the region. Eychaner saw an opportunity: he bought a majority stake in Great Lakes and its WDAI construction permit and then paid Northwest Indiana Public Broadcasting $684,000 to join it in a petition to switch the statuses of channel 50 and 56 and then assign the WDAI permit to channel 50—enabling it to be built on the Sears Tower—and WCAE to the newly noncommercial channel 56. The FCC approved such swaps among channels in the same band, as was the case with the two UHF stations, in March 1986, and in August, the commission issued final orders switching the commercial and noncommercial allocations for Gary. The money Northwest Indiana Public Broadcasting received from Metrowest enabled it to land a federal grant to build out its facility, which returned to the air November 15, 1987, as WYIN.

The move may have been initially planned to allow both WPWR and WBBS to go full-time on their own channels. However, market conditions intervened during this time that would force WBBS-TV off the air. In the spring of 1985, WSNS announced it would exit subscription television and become a full-time affiliate of the Spanish International Network (today's Univision). WCIU, the previous SIN outlet in Chicago, then took an affiliation with the NetSpan network. WBBS-TV owner Miyares, realizing that the loss of the NetSpan affiliation would be crippling for his station, reduced WBBS' programming schedule to 8 p.m. to its late-night sign-off on weekend evenings late that year, selling the rest of the weekday time periods that his station had occupied to Eychaner, allowing WPWR to broadcast full-time on weekdays. WBBS shut down for good in early 1986; Miyares sold WBBS' remaining airtime on the channel to Eychaner, turning WPWR into a 24-hour operation, until Eychaner's purchase of the WBBS-TV license for $11 million closed on August 22, 1986, when WPWR-TV went full-time.

The following year, only able to own one station, Eychaner sold the channel 60 license to the Home Shopping Network (HSN) for $25 million, in order to move WPWR-TV's programming and call sign to UHF channel 50. When the frequency swap occurred on January 18, 1987, WPWR moved to channel 50, with a rerun of the anthology series Night Gallery as the first program it aired on its new frequency; the now HSN-owned channel 60 simultaneously had its call letters changed to WEHS (it is now UniMás owned-and-operated station WXFT-DT).

As time went on, WPWR began acquiring many cartoons, more recent off-network sitcoms, drama series, movies and first-run syndicated shows (including Star Trek: The Next Generation in 1987 and War of the Worlds in 1988; at least one Star Trek spinoff would air on WPWR from that time until June 2005, when UPN aired the last network episode of Star Trek: Enterprise). Within a year of starting full-time operation on channel 50, WPWR had firmly established itself as the third independent station in Chicago, behind WGN-TV (channel 9) and future sister station WFLD (channel 32). Although WFLD had become a charter owned-and-operated station of Fox in October 1986, that network would not air a full week's worth of programming until September 1993, so for all intents and purposes it was still programmed as an independent. In late August 1994, the station began carrying the Spelling Premiere Network syndication service, which featured a "Spelling Success" run of past series produced by Aaron Spelling and his company.

=== UPN affiliation (1995–2006) ===
On November 10, 1993, WPWR-TV signed an affiliation agreement with Chris-Craft/United Television, to become a charter affiliate of the United Paramount Network (UPN); WPWR competed with WGN-TV—which initially turned down an affiliation with The WB, a joint venture between Time Warner and WGN parent Tribune Broadcasting that debuted the week before UPN launched—for the affiliation. WGN, meanwhile, reversed course and signed an affiliation agreement with The WB one month later on December 3.

WPWR-TV's "UPN Chicago" logo, used from 2002 to 2006.

WPWR-TV formally affiliated with UPN when the network launched on January 16, 1995. As WPWR was never owned by either of UPN's parent companies, Chris-Craft Industries or Viacom (the latter—which maintained a program partnership with the network from its launch through Paramount Television—acquired 50% of UPN in 1996 and bought out Chris-Craft's stake in 2000), it was the largest UPN station that was not owned by the network.

On June 27, 2002, Newsweb Corporation sold WPWR to Fox Television Stations (at the time, a subsidiary of News Corporation, which in turn was the then-parent company of the Fox network) for $425 million—a handsome return on Eychaner's original investment from 20 years earlier. The sale closed on August 21, 2002. As a result of this transaction, Fox now owned UPN's three largest affiliates; it already owned WWOR-TV in New York City and KCOP-TV in Los Angeles as a result of its $5.5 billion purchase of most of Chris-Craft's television holdings the previous year. Although rumors abounded that UPN's future was in jeopardy due to its three largest stations being effectively owned by the corporate parent of another network, Fox renewed the network's affiliation agreements for WPWR and the group's eight other UPN-affiliated stations for three additional years from September 24, 2003, to September 15, 2006.

=== MyNetworkTV affiliation (2006–2016) ===
The station's logo for its MyNetworkTV affiliation from 2006 until 2024. Some iterations of the logo were glossy or displayed the city of license of Gary before Chicago.

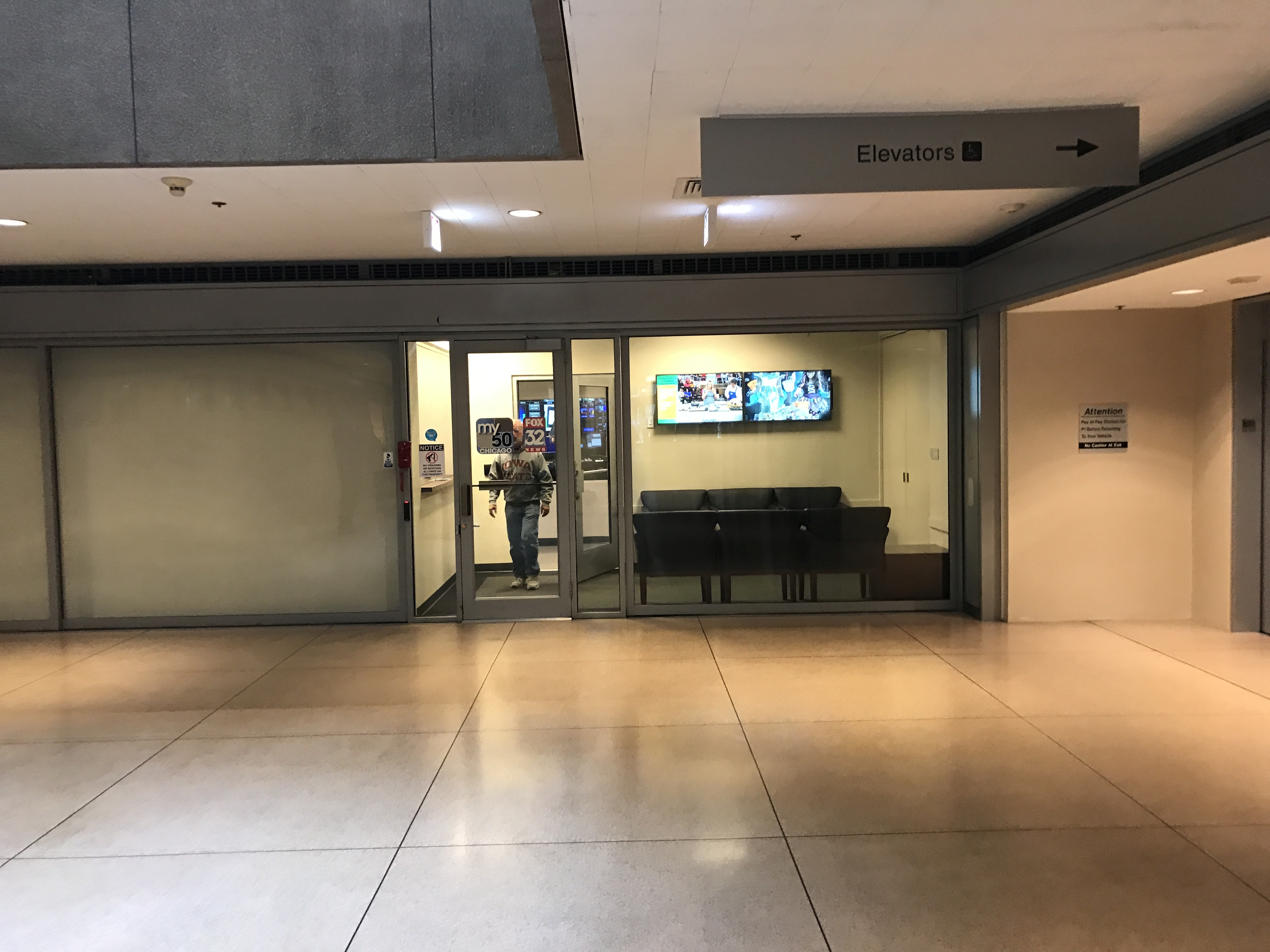
The main entrance to the studios of WFLD & WPWR on the ground floor of Michigan Plaza in September 2016 (at the time the logo had not been changed to that of WPWR's CW-era logo).

On January 24, 2006, the Warner Bros. Entertainment unit of Time Warner and CBS Corporation (owner of WBBM-TV) announced that the two companies would shut down their respective networks, The WB and UPN, and combine their individual programs to create a new "fifth" television network called The CW. With the announcement, The CW signed a ten-year agreement with Tribune Broadcasting to affiliate 16 of the group's 19 WB affiliates—including Tribune flagship station WGN-TV—with the new network. In response to having its UPN affiliates be passed over for affiliations with The CW, Fox Television Stations stripped all network branding from and ceased promoting the network's programming on its UPN-affiliated stations. However, it is very unlikely that WPWR would have been selected as The CW's Chicago affiliate in any event. Representatives for The CW were on record as preferring to align with UPN and The WB's "strongest" affiliates; WGN-TV had been well ahead of WPWR in the ratings since the latter's sign-on.

One month later on February 22, 2006, Fox announced the launch of its own "sixth" network called MyNetworkTV, which would be operated by Fox Television Stations and its sibling subsidiary Twentieth Television, with WPWR and the other Fox-owned UPN affiliates serving as the nuclei for the new network. In the interim, the station changed its on-air branding to "Power 50" (as a play on its call letters), which remained in use for most of the summer of 2006. However, the station simultaneously began to use the "My50" brand in some advertisements to promote the change, particularly at station-sponsored events held during that timeframe (such as the Taste of Chicago); this brand began to be used by the station officially in July 2006. WPWR became a MyNetworkTV owned-and-operated station when the network launched on September 5, 2006.

In September 2014, the New York Post reported that Fox Television Stations was considering trading WPWR to Tribune Broadcasting (which would have created a new duopoly with WGN-TV), in exchange for acquiring that company's Seattle Fox affiliate KCPQ, as part of the company's efforts at the time to seek station purchases in markets with teams in the National Football Conference (to which the Fox network holds primary broadcast rights). Should the proposal have been accepted, Tribune would legally have been able to create a duopoly in Chicago as a result of the then-recent spin-off of its publishing business (which resulted in the severance of WGN-TV's joint ownership with the Chicago Tribune after 66 years). On September 23, Tribune announced that it had been notified by Fox that its affiliation with KCPQ would be terminated effective January 17, 2015, but that discussions between the two companies were still ongoing; on October 7, The Wall Street Journal reported that WPWR was no longer included in the negotiations (Fox would subsequently back off its attempt to acquire KCPQ as well as a lame-duck purchase of KBCB in nearby Bellingham, Washington, opting to renew its affiliation agreement with the former on October 17; KCPQ is now owned by Fox as of March 2020).

=== CW affiliation (2016–2019) ===
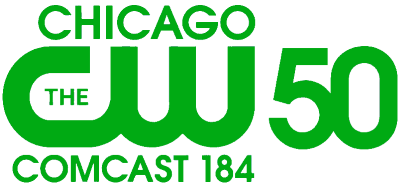
Logo as CW affiliate, used from 2016 to 2019.

On May 23, 2016 (although first reported by Robert Feder on his website the day prior), Tribune Broadcasting and The CW reached a five-year affiliation agreement that renewed the network's affiliations with twelve of Tribune's CW-affiliated stations through the 2020–21 television season. However, in negotiating the terms of the deal, Tribune decided not to renew The CW's affiliation with WGN-TV after the expiration of their initial ten-year agreement on September 1, 2016. Tribune decided to run WGN-TV as an independent, allowing it to fully commit to its schedule of local sports without the requirements to move some broadcasts to WPWR-TV due to network limits on preemptions, and to rebroadcast preempted programming on The CW's off nights.

On the date the deal was announced, CBS Corporation and Fox Television Stations announced a long-term deal in which WPWR would become the CW affiliate for the Chicago market once WGN disaffiliated from the network. This marked the first time a station currently owned by Fox chose to affiliate with The CW.

At the time the announcement was made, there was no mention of MyNetworkTV's future relationship with WPWR, including if the programming service would move to another station. When WPWR took over as Chicago's CW affiliate on September 1, the station instead retained MyNetworkTV as a secondary affiliation, airing its programming between 10 p.m. and midnight (later moved to between 9 and 11 p.m., immediately following The CW's prime time lineup). On July 11, 2016, WPWR-TV unveiled its CW-standardized logo with the launch of a "Make the CWitch" promotional video advertising the then-pending switch.

The affiliation transaction made Chicago the largest market where The CW and MyNetworkTV share a primary channel affiliation on a single station; by 2019, it was one of three stations with such a dual affiliation (the others being WKTC in Columbia, South Carolina, and KFMB-DT2 in San Diego). It was also the first time a network owned-and-operated station has opted to carry a network owned by its parent company as a secondary affiliation. In addition, WPWR was the largest CW affiliate not owned by either Tribune Media or CBS Corporation.

=== Return to "My50" (2019–2024) ===
On April 18, 2019, Weigel Broadcasting signed an agreement through which WCIU-TV would take over as The CW's Chicago-area affiliate. The station's last CW program carried was on August 31, which was Did I Mention Invention? from the network's One Magnificent Morning E/I block. With The CW's move, the MyNetworkTV programming returned to prime time on WPWR's weeknight schedule, airing from 8 to 10 p.m., sandwiched between episodes of Chicago P.D. (carrying four episodes of the series from the programming service and syndication on Tuesday evenings); the loss of the CW affiliation led the station to return to the "My50 Chicago" branding on September 1, 2019.

=== Fox Chicago Plus (2024–present) ===
The station dropped the "My50" moniker again and was quietly rebranded as "Fox Chicago Plus" with the start of the new television season on September 23, 2024, bringing it in pattern with other Fox-owned MyNetworkTV stations that have chosen to brand with a 'plus' suffix as a complement to their Fox sister stations, with the programming service being pushed further from prime time. Commensurate with the rebranding, MyNetworkTV programming moved to 11 p.m. to 1 a.m. weeknights, with a four-episode block of Family Feud replacing it from 7 p.m. to 9 p.m.

== Programming ==
Occasionally as time permits, WPWR may air Fox network programs whenever WFLD is unable to in the event of extended breaking news or severe weather coverage. In certain instances, WPWR may also interrupt regularly scheduled programming to simulcast live breaking news coverage, whether from WFLD or from Fox News. WPWR is the only major television station in the Chicago market that has never aired regularly scheduled local news programming of any kind.

=== Case Files Chicago with Andy Hale ===
Starting in the 2012 fall television season, WPWR-TV has aired Crimestoppers Case Files: Chicago, a true-crime documentary show profiling unsolved homicides and violent crimes in the Chicago area. The show was created by Christopher Shawn Rech, producer of the Showtime documentary A Murder in the Park, and is hosted by executive producer Andy Hale.

The 30-minute program covers one to two cases per episode and features interviews with detectives and family members, as well as walk-throughs of the actual crime scenes and dramatic reenactments. The show airs in the 11 p.m. time slot and is produced by show runners Andrew K. Smith and Marc Wilkinson.

In October 2017, Case Files Chicago was nominated for an Emmy Award by the National Academy of Television Arts and Sciences Chicago/Midwest Chapter in "Outstanding Achievement for Public Affairs/Current Affairs Programming – Series" for their season 5 episode profiling the unsolved murder of Anthony "TJ" Green. Later that month, Wilkinson took over directing duties on the program, with Smith now overseeing post-production.

In January 2018, the official title of the show was changed from Crimestoppers Case Files: Chicago to Case Files Chicago with Andy Hale.

=== Sports programming ===
Starting with the 2008 season, WPWR obtained broadcast rights to games from the Major League Soccer franchise Chicago Fire S.C. In September 2009, the station acquired the partial local television rights to broadcast American Hockey League games involving the Chicago Wolves, carrying games to which Comcast Network 100 did not hold rights. The over-the-air Wolves telecasts moved to independent station WMEU-CD (channel 48) in 2013. Currently, the Wolves games returned to WPWR beginning with the 2016–17 season on a weekly basis; these games air on Saturdays, when CW network programming is not aired as a result. Through WFLD's April 2008 programming agreement with the team, WPWR carries select preseason games and other team-related programming from the Chicago Bears (including the feature/interview program Inside the Bears).

Through an agreement with Tribune Broadcasting, WPWR became a tertiary outlet for the Chicago Cubs and Chicago White Sox beginning in the 2015 season, broadcasting occasional telecasts of the two teams' Major League Baseball games that are produced by WGN-TV (through its WGN Sports programming unit), due to that station's network affiliation contracts with The CW that limit the number of programming preemptions that WGN-TV is allowed on an annual basis (these telecasts were previously seen on WCIU-TV, which discontinued its overflow agreement with WGN as a result of the January 12, 2015, launch of a prime time newscast produced by ABC owned-and-operated station WLS-TV, channel 7). This agreement ended after WPWR assumed The CW affiliation from WGN; with WGN reverting to independence, it no longer had network-mandated preemption restrictions forcing it to move sports telecasts to other stations in the market. On August 22, 2026, WPWR was air Fox's Baseball Night in America telecast of a Cubs game against the Seattle Mariners so that WFLD could fulfill its obligation to carry a Bears preseason game.

In 2025, WPWR announced an agreement to broadcast 15 games featuring the Chicago Hounds of Major League Rugby, and 8 games featuring Chicago Stars FC of the National Women's Soccer League.

== Technical information ==
=== Subchannels ===
Subchannels of WFLD and WPWR-TV
License	Subchannel	Res.	Short name	Programming
WFLD	32.1	720p	WFLD-DT	Fox
WFLD	32.2	480i	Movies!	Movies!
WFLD	32.3	480i	Buzzr	Buzzr
WFLD	32.4	480i	ROAR	Roar
WFLD	32.5	480i	Fox WX	Fox Weather
WFLD	2.3	480i	DABL	Dabl (WBBM-TV)
WPWR-TV	50.1	720p	WPWR-DT	Main WPWR-TV programming

Broadcast on behalf of another station

Before the shift to the channel share with WFLD, WPWR-TV maintained a Mobile DTV feed of its main channel on 50.1 (labelled "WPWR"), as well as a mobile simulcast of sister station WFLD (labelled "WPWR"). Broadcasting at 3.67 Mbit/s, it was the highest bitrate of any Chicago television station's mobile feed.

From August 2012 until August 2015, WPWR-DT3 acted as a full-market simulcast of the main channel of WOCK-CD (channel 13), carrying Fox's Spanish-language MundoFox network. It dropped the simulcast when Fox sold off their interest in the network, which continued for sixteen more months until being shut down on December 1, 2016, as MundoMax.

Even during its CW affiliation, WPWR remained in the 720p format, below the network's preferred 1080i resolution, due to both WPWR channel sharing with WFLD with a number of subchannels, along with 720p being the Fox high definition standard.

=== Analog-to-digital conversion ===
WPWR-TV shut down its analog signal, over UHF channel 50, on June 12, 2009, the official date on which full-power television stations in the United States transitioned from analog to digital broadcasts under federal mandate. The station's digital signal continued to broadcast on its pre-transition UHF channel 51, using virtual channel 50.

=== Spectrum reallocation ===
In April 2017, during the FCC's incentive auction, WPWR-TV sold its spectrum for $160,748,259. WPWR's channels moved to WFLD's spectrum on June 11, 2018, with its subchannels being renumbered to WFLD's virtual channel 32, though WPWR's main channel retained virtual channel 50.1.
