= Mal Bellairs =

American radio and television personality (1919–2010)

- Born: November 9, 1919; Cheyenne, Wyoming
- Died: July 10, 2010 (aged 90); Woodstock, Illinois
- Education: Pasadena Playhouse
- Occupations: Radio and TV host, writer
- Years active: 1946-1997
- Known for: Lifelong career in Chicago radio and TV
- Notable work: The Christmas Show; Now Why Is It Ye're Comin ta Ireland
- Spouses: Josephine Elizabeth Morrissy (m. 1941–1975) Maria Henslee (m. 1976–2010)
- Website: bellairs.org

Mal Bellairs (born November 9, 1919 – July 12, 2010) was a well-known Chicago-area radio and television personality during the second half of the 20th century. He was named a National Radio Hall of Fame Regional Pioneer by the Illinois Broadcasters Association.

== Early Days ==
Mal was born in Cheyenne, Wyoming in 1919, the only son of Keith Bellairs and Gertrude Sackett of Telluride, Colorado. In his teen years he was raised on the ranch of his uncle Thorwald Sackett in Colorado. He recounted being enthralled by the wonder of radio on a visit to Denver as a boy. He also recounts a family trip to Chicago to attend the 1933 World's Fair.

== Radio History ==
Mal's career in radio began at WCFL (AM) in Chicago in 1947. He left WCFL to do freelance radio and television in the Chicago market.

Mal then spent most of the 1950s and 1960s at WBBM (AM) radio in Chicago Illinois. His history with WBBM is recounted in an oral history interview from 1987. Mal's contributions to WBBM were highlighted in a subsequent history of that radio station, WBBM Radio Yesterday & Today.

In 1969 Mal and his wife Jo purchased WCLR radio in Crystal Lake, Illinois and changed the call letters to WIVS. They later purchased an FM station in Woodstock, Illinois and used the call letters WXRD. Subsequently, WIVS became WAIT (AM).

The Chicago Tribune reported on Mal's "semi-retirement" in 1992. The article quotes Chuck Schaden, Chicago radio history buff and host of Golden Age of Radio programs on WBBM-AM and WNIB-FM 97.1 saying "Mal Bellairs was, and still is, as far as I`m concerned, a giant in Chicago broadcasting."

== The Christmas Show ==
In 1955 Mal presented a Christmas Show that became a Chicago tradition. He did a Christmas Show every year after that, continuing at WBBM (AM) and then at his own station, WIVS. The recording of the Christmas Show that is available online was made from a live broadcast in 1997. A copy of the clearances for the playlist of the 1961 Christmas Show is in the National Archives.

== Later Years and Ireland ==
In his memoir, Now Why Is It Ye're Comin ta Ireland, Mal discussed his decision to leave WBBM radio for much smaller stations of his own—WIVS, Crystal Lake, Illinois and WXRD, Woodstock, Illinois—and his subsequent purchase of Liscrona House in Doonaha near Kilkee in County Clare Ireland.

== Honors ==
The Illinois Senate adopted a resolution in his honor citing "his 50-year legendary broadcasting career". The Chicago City Council adopted a resolution in tribute to Mal Bellairs in 2014.
