= WAIT (AM) =

Radio station in Crystal Lake, Illinois (1965–2019)

- Crystal Lake, Illinois; United States
- Broadcast area: Chicago metropolitan area
- Frequency: 850 kHz

History
- First air date: October 1, 1965
- Last air date: August 27, 2019
- Former call signs: WCLR (1965–1969); WIVS (1969–1986); WAIT (1986–2005); WCPT (2005–2007)

Technical information
- Licensing authority: FCC
- Facility ID: 53504
- Class: D
- Power: 2,500 watts (daytime only)
- Transmitter coordinates: 42°15′30.1″N 88°21′48.3″W

Links
- Public license information: Public file; LMS

WAIT (850 kHz) was an AM radio station licensed to Crystal Lake, Illinois, and serving the Chicago metropolitan area. It was licensed by the Federal Communications Commission (FCC) as a Class D station and broadcast only during daytime hours, signing off at sunset to protect KOA in Denver, the clear-channel station on 850 kHz.

The station had a highly directional pattern, with nulls to the northeast and southwest, to protect WGVS in Muskegon, Michigan, and KFUO in Clayton, Missouri. Because of its northwest suburban location and directional pattern, WAIT could be heard in Rockford, Illinois, and Janesville, Wisconsin, in addition to the Chicago media market.

== History ==
=== WCLR ===
The station began broadcasting on October 1, 1965, holding the call sign WCLR, which stood for "Crystal Lake Radio". The station originally ran 500 watts during daytime hours only. The station was owned by George DeBeer, Lynn Renne, and Art Thorsen. The station aired easy listening music, along with local news and high school football games.

=== WIVS ===
In 1969, the station was purchased by Mal Bellairs, a WBBM personality, for $350,000. Bellairs changed the station's call letters to WIVS, standing for "wives", reflecting the station's programming aimed at housewives. Under Bellairs ownership, the station aired middle of the road (MOR) music, as well as talk, cooking, gardening, and sports programming. In 1981, Bellairs sold the station, along with 105.5 WXRD in Woodstock, to Katy Communications for $838,000. Mal Bellairs would continue to host a music and talk show on the station until March 11, 1985, when WIVS began airing a country music format using programming fed by the Satellite Music Network. In 1985, WIVS's power was increased from 500 watts to 2,500 watts.

=== 850 becomes WAIT ===
In April 1986, the original WAIT at 820 kHz, which was best known for its beautiful music format in the 1960s and '70s, changed its call letters to WCZE, branded "Cozy" radio, and began airing a soft adult contemporary format. In May 1986, 850 picked up the WAIT call letters, while continuing to air its Satellite Music Network fed country music format.

In 1988, the station was sold to Crystal Lake Radio, along with 105.5 WXET in Woodstock, for $1.6 million. The new owners replaced the country music format with a full service format, with oldies music comprising approximately 70% of its schedule, with the remainder devoted to programming of local interest, along with old time radio and ethnic programs on weekends.

On January 1, 1990, the station adopted a beautiful music format. In 1991, the station was sold to Pride Communications, along with 105.5 WAIT-FM, for $2.2 million. In autumn 1991, the station's former owner, Mal Bellairs, returned to the station, and began serving as an announcer.

=== Adult standards years ===
In late December 1992, WAIT adopted an adult standards format. The station initially aired ABC Radio's satellite-fed adult standards format Stardust, which featured longtime Chicago area radio personality Eddie Hubbard. On November 26, 1994, the station switched to Westwood One's satellite-fed adult standards format called "AM Only" (now America's Best Music). WAIT enjoyed ratings success as an adult standards station, making it into the top 10 among Chicago area stations and taking a 3.3 audience share in April 1996. At least part of the ratings increase could be attributed to longtime adult standards station 1160 WJJD switching to a news/talk format.

On May 5, 1996, Clark Weber began hosting a Friday morning talk show on WAIT, and on February 20, 1999, longtime WGN 720 talk show host Wally Phillips began hosting a two-hour Saturday morning talk show. In October 2000, NextMedia Group purchased Pride Communications' nine radio stations, including WAIT, for approximately $57 million.

=== Chicagoland's Voice ===
Although still enjoying relatively good ratings, WAIT switched from adult standards to a news-talk format branded "Chicagoland's Voice" on January 28, 2002. The station carried longtime Chicago area talk show host Libby Collins, as well as syndicated hosts including Bill O'Reilly, Mike Gallagher, Rusty Humphries, and Michael Savage. Wally Phillips and Clark Weber's talk shows continued. Ratings plummeted after the station's format change, and in the fall of 2003 the station was sold to Newsweb Corporation for $8.25 million.

=== Newsweb ownership ===
In October 2003, Newsweb took ownership of AM 850 WAIT, and the talk format ended on the station. The station began airing brokered programming and the syndicated AAA program World Cafe.

In May 2005, the station adopted a progressive talk format, and its call sign was changed to WCPT. The station was an affiliate of Air America. Hosts heard on the station included Rachel Maddow, Jerry Springer, Al Franken, Ed Schultz, and Randi Rhodes. The WAIT call letters were moved to 820 AM. On November 26, 2007, the progressive talk format and the WCPT call sign moved to 820 AM, and the WAIT call sign returned to this station.

On February 25, 2009, the station began airing brokered religious programming in both Spanish and English as "La Promesa"/"The Promise". The station ceased airing brokered religious programming in July 2019, and began airing a variety of music and later syndicated public affairs talk shows. In August 2019, Newsweb sold WAIT's transmitter site to McHenry County College, and on August 27 the station was taken off the air. Newsweb surrendered the station's license on July 15, 2020, and the FCC cancelled the license on July 21.
