= WNDZ =

- Portage, Indiana; United States
- Broadcast area: Chicago metropolitan area
- Frequency: 750 kHz
- Branding: Access Radio Chicago

Programming
- Format: Classic hits

Ownership
- Owner: Newsweb Corporation; (WNDZ LLC)

History
- First air date: May 13, 1987
- Call sign meaning: The Windy City

Technical information
- Licensing authority: FCC
- Facility ID: 73316
- Class: D
- Power: 15,000 watts days only
- Transmitter coordinates: 41°33′49.14″N 87°9′18.12″W

Links
- Public license information: Public file; LMS

WNDZ (750 kHz) is a commercial AM radio station broadcasting a classic hits format. Licensed to Portage, Indiana, it serves the Chicago metropolitan area. The station is owned by Newsweb Corporation.

WNDZ is a daytimer station. It transmits 15,000 watts. To send its signal toward Chicago from its transmitter site, it uses a directional antenna with a three-tower array. Because 750 AM is a clear channel frequency reserved for Class A station WSB in Atlanta, WNDZ must go off the air at sunset to avoid interference. The towers are on Bay Road at Robbins Road in Portage.

== Programming ==
Now running a music format, WNDZ had previously been a brokered programming station, where hosts pay for their time on the air and may advertise their products and services or seek donations.

== History ==
WNDZ began broadcasting on May 13, 1987, as a daytime-only station, running 2,500 watts, and was owned by Universal Broadcasting, with Rick Schwartz as its first general manager. The business office and studios were located in Lansing, Illinois. They are currently on Milwaukee Avenue in Chicago. The station originally aired a mixture of Contemporary Christian with some ethnic programming. In 1992, the station was sold to Douglas Broadcasting, for $2 million.

In 1994, the station joined Douglas Broadcasting's new AsiaOne network. In 1997, the station's power was increased to 5,000 watts. In late May 1998, the station switched from brokered programming to the motivational "Personal Achievement Radio" network, which moved from WYPA 820. Later that year, the station was purchased by Z-Spanish Radio. In 2000, Z-Spanish Radio was acquired by Entravision Communications.

In 2004, Entravision Communications sold the station to Newsweb Corporation, along with 99.9 FM WRZA, for $24 million. In 2007, the station's power was increased to 15,000 watts. The station has featured brokered programming for most of its history.
