= WCRW (Chicago) =

AM radio station in Illinois, US

Chicago, Illinois; United States
- Frequency: 1240 kHz

Programming
- Format: Multicultural radio

History
- First air date: 1926
- Last air date: June 17, 1996
- Former frequencies: 720 kHz (1926–1927); 1340 kHz (1927–1928); 1210 kHz (1928–1941)
- Call sign meaning: Clinton R. White

Technical information
- Facility ID: 71296
- Transmitter coordinates: 41°58′53.1″N 87°46′20.2″W

WCRW was an AM radio station in Chicago, Illinois, which operated on a "shared time" basis until 1996 with two other stations, WEDC and WSBC, each broadcasting a part of the day.

== History ==
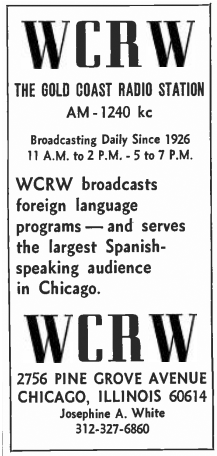
1964 station advertisement.

WCRW was first licensed on July 30, 1926, to Clinton R. White, a radio engineer, at 650 Waveland Avenue in Chicago's north side. The station was started during a period when the government had temporarily lost the authority to assign transmitting frequencies, and at the end of 1926, WCRW was reported to be operating on a self-assigned frequency of 720 kHz, located at 817 Grace Street. White and his wife, Josephine, worked at their station as a team, sharing the on-air duties. Josephine claimed to be the first female disc jockey. While the Whites entertained friends and neighbors with their radio station, this programming was not able to pay the station's operating expenses. They were able to stay afloat by selling segments of the station's air time to others. German, Italian, and Swedish language programs paid the bills.

In order to restore regulatory authority, the U.S. Congress passed the Radio Act of 1927, which created the Federal Radio Commission (FRC). Stations were initially issued a series of temporary authorizations, starting on May 3, 1927. The Chicago area was one of the most congested regions, and many stations, including WCRW, were relocated to frequency sharing assignments. On June 1, 1927, WCRW's frequency was changed to 1340 kHz, with time-sharing partners WPCC and WFKB. Stations were also informed that if they wanted to continue operating, they needed to file a formal license application by January 15, 1928, as the first step in determining whether they met the new "public interest, convenience, or necessity" standard. On May 25, 1928, the FRC issued General Order 32, which notified 164 stations, including WCRW, that "From an examination of your application for future license it does not find that public interest, convenience, or necessity would be served by granting it." The station's foreign language programming was helpful in this process, convincing the commission that it should remain licensed, although the station made an unsuccessful attempt in federal court to reverse an ordered reduction in power.

The Whites moved the station into the Embassy Hotel at Pine Grove and Diversey, on Chicago's Gold Coast, and WCRW began identifying itself as "The Gold Coast Station". On November 11, 1928, the FRC implemented a major reallocation, as part of a reorganization resulting from its General Order 40. WCRW was assigned to 1210 kHz, along with WSBC and WEDC, stations which also broadcast ethnic programming. These stations continued to timeshare for the next 70 years. From the 1920s through the 1960s, the three station managers met annually to allocate broadcasting hours. The agreement limited WCRW broadcasts to five hours daily, with the remaining hours divided between the other two stations. Each station operated from different locations, with three separate transmitter sites. In 1957, WCRW's daily schedule was reported to be 11 a.m-2 p.m., plus 5 p.m-7 p.m.

In 1941, the three stations were moved to 1240 kHz, as part of the implementation of the NARBA frequency plan. Clinton White died of a heart attack in 1963, after which Josephine brought in Ed Jacker as manager, chief engineer and ownership partner. Under Jacker's management, WCRW's power was increased, first to 250 watts and then finally to 1,000. The ethnic groups served by the station's programming changed over time, eventually most of its five hours on the air became Spanish language programming. After Josephine White's death, total ownership of WCRW went to Jacker, and eventually to his daughter. In 1989, the station left the Embassy Hotel for studios near Milwaukee and Bryn Mawr, on Chicago's northwest side.

Daniel Lee, who was now the owner of WSBC, purchased WCRW in June 1995 for $500,000. On June 17, 1996, WCRW signed off for the last time, almost 70 years after Clinton and Josephine White began broadcasting. However, WCRW was not formally deleted by the Federal Communications Commission until June 2006.
