= WCFJ (Illinois) =

- Chicago Heights, Illinois; United States
- Broadcast area: Chicago's south suburbs, South Side, and Northwest Indiana
- Frequency: 1470 kHz

Ownership
- Owner: Newsweb Corporation (1998–2015); (WCFJ, Inc.)

History
- First air date: August 15, 1963 (as WMPP)
- Last air date: November 7, 2015
- Former call signs: WMPP (1963–1989)
- Call sign meaning: "Winning Chicagoland For Jesus"

Technical information
- Facility ID: 37246
- Class: B
- Power: 1,000 watts
- Transmitter coordinates: 41°25′29.1″N 87°38′27.1″W

WCFJ (1470 AM) was a radio station licensed to Chicago Heights, Illinois, United States. Its transmitter was located south of Crete, Illinois, and served Chicago's south suburbs and South Side, as well as Northwest Indiana. The station's original call sign was WMPP.

== History ==
=== WMPP ===
WMPP began broadcasting on August 15, 1963, and originally aired a R&B format. The call letters stood for "Working More for People's Progress". The station originally ran 1,000 watts during daytime hours only.

Originally owned by Seaway Broadcasting Company, it was the first African-American owned and operated radio station in the Midwest. The station was founded by William S. Martin and Charles Pinckard. Martin died in October 1963, and Charles Pinckard acquired controlling interest in the company in 1964. In 1979, the estate of Charles Pinckard sold Seaway Broadcasting to James M. Benages for $150,000.

=== Religious era ===
The station continued to air an R&B format until 1980, when the station adopted a gospel music format. Gospel singer Albertina Walker hosted a program on the station in the 1980s.

The license was assigned to JANA Broadcasting in 1981. In 1983, the station added nighttime operations, running 1,000 watts. JANA Broadcasting went bankrupt in the mid-1980s. A partnership planned to purchase the station and change its format to urban contemporary, but they were unable to obtain financing before the deadline and the station was taken off the air on January 14, 1988. In 1989, the station was sold to Liberty Temple Full Gospel Church for $400,000.

In 1989, the station's call sign was changed to WCFJ, which stood for "Winning Chicagoland For Jesus". The station aired a religious format. In 1997, the station was taken silent, with the station remaining off the air until the following year.

=== Newsweb ownership ===
In 1998, the station was sold to Newsweb Corporation for $425,000, and the station began airing brokered ethnic programming. Some of the station's programs were simulcast on 1240 WSBC. After Newsweb's purchase, WCFJ began airing LesBiGay Radio weekday evenings. The program was heard on WCFJ until April 2001, and was simulcast on WSBC.

From July 2001 to June 3, 2005, Neil Tesser hosted a jazz program titled Miles Ahead, which aired weekday afternoons/evenings on WCFJ. The last two hours of Miles Ahead were simulcast on 1240 WSBC.

On November 7, 2015, Newsweb took WCFJ off the air, citing that the station was no longer profitable. The license was surrendered to the Federal Communications Commission (FCC) on November 9, 2015; the FCC cancelled the license and deleted the WCFJ call sign the same day.
