= WSBC =

- Chicago, Illinois; United States
- Broadcast area: Chicago metropolitan area
- Frequency: 1240 kHz
- Branding: Radio UA Chicago

Programming
- Format: Ukrainian programming

Ownership
- Owner: Heartland Signal LLC
- Sister stations: WCPT

History
- First air date: 1925
- Call sign meaning: World Storage Battery Company

Technical information
- Licensing authority: FCC
- Facility ID: 16847
- Class: C
- Power: 1,000 watts unlimited
- Transmitter coordinates: 41°58′53.11″N 87°46′20.22″W

Links
- Public license information: Public file; LMS

WSBC (1240 kHz) is a commercial AM radio station in Chicago, Illinois. It broadcasts brokered programming, mostly ethnic and religious. It is owned by Heartland Signal LLC.

WSBC transmits with 1,000 watts. Its transmitter site is on North Milwaukee Avenue at West Catalpa Avenue in Chicago. It shares its tower with sister station WCPT (820 AM).

== Programming ==
WSBC features programming aimed at ethnic communities including Russian, Ukrainian, Latino, Italian, Latvian and Irish. Hosts buy time on the station and may offer their services or seek donations during their shows.

From its beginning, the station has featured a variety of ethnic programming. The Sousa Archives and Center for American Music holds the Frank Scheibenreif Slovak, Czech, and Romi Sound Recording Collection, ca. 1930-1950. This collection includes 1,001 recordings, including 753 78-R.P.M., 140 45-R.P.M., and 108 LPs; and one book documenting Eastern Europe music prior to World War II, principally from Czechoslovakia and used by Scheibenreif for the WSBC show, "Slovak American Radio Review".

== History ==
=== Early years ===
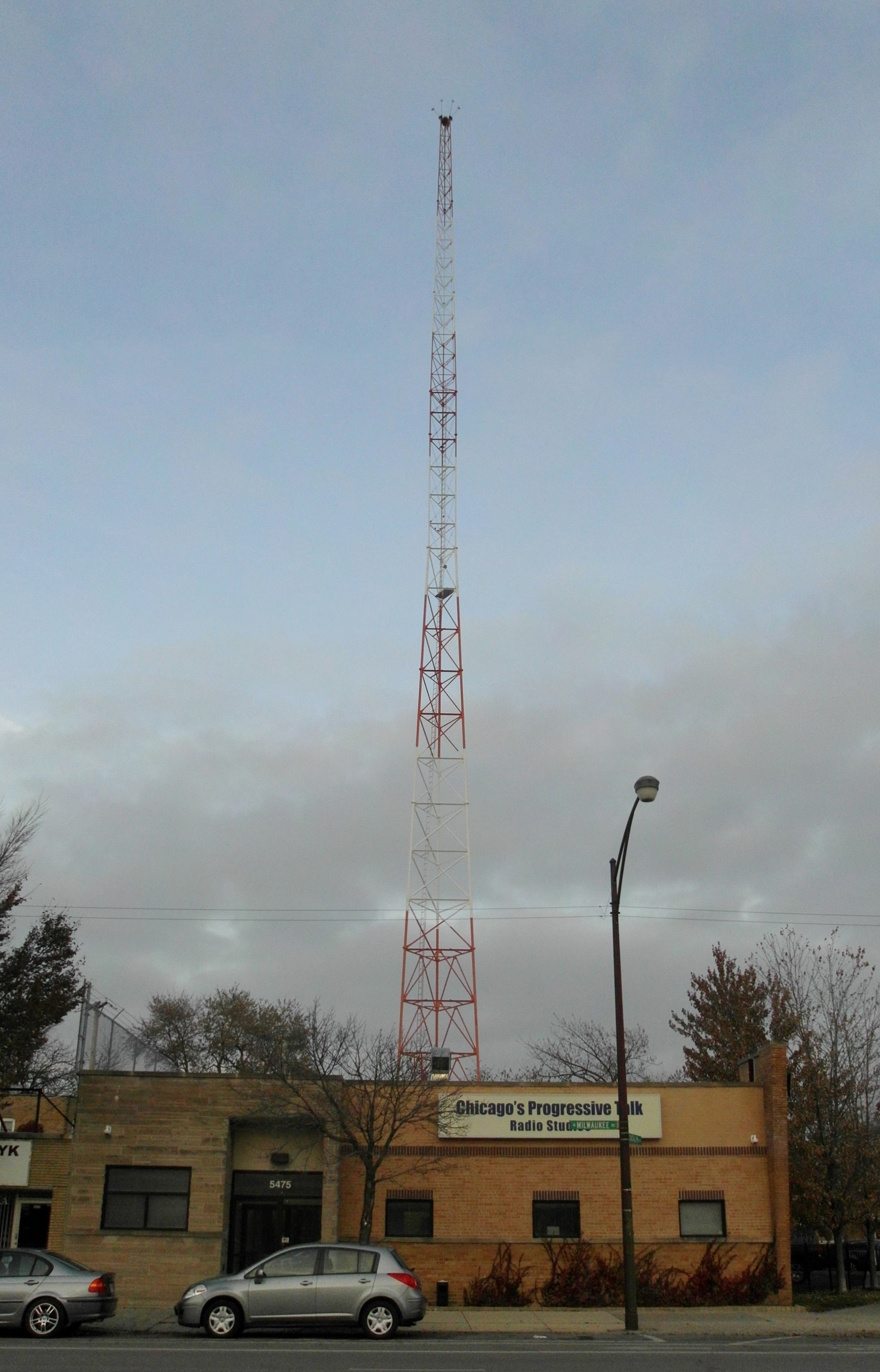
WSBC's tower on Milwaukee Ave.

WSBC was first licensed on June 26, 1925, to the World Battery Company at 1219 South Wabash Avenue in Chicago, transmitting on 1430 kHz. Its call sign stood for "World Storage Battery Company". In 1926, its frequency was changed to 1040 kHz and in 1927 it was changed to 1290 kHz.

Following the establishment of the Federal Radio Commission (FRC), stations were initially issued a series of temporary authorizations starting on May 3, 1927. In addition, they were informed that if they wanted to continue operating, they needed to file a formal license application by January 15, 1928, as the first step in determining whether they met the new "public interest, convenience, or necessity" standard. On May 25, 1928, the FRC issued General Order 32, which notified 164 stations, including WSBC, that "From an examination of your application for future license it does not find that public interest, convenience, or necessity would be served by granting it." However, the station successfully convinced the commission that it should remain licensed.

On November 11, 1928, the FRC implemented a major reallocation of station transmitting frequencies, as part of a reorganization resulting from its implementation of General Order 40. WSBC was assigned to 1210 kHz, sharing time with WCRW and WEDC. Its studios and transmitter were located at the New Southern Hotel (later known as the Hotel Crillon) at 13th and Michigan Avenue.

WSBC hired the nation's first full-time African-American radio announcer, Jack Cooper, who on November 3, 1929, began hosting The All-Negro Hour, a vaudevillesque entertainment program.

On April 1, 1933, Gene Dyer purchased WSBC from C.J. Gordon, who had operated it since August 1932. At the time, Dyer also owned WGES in Chicago. In 1936, the station's studios and transmitter were moved to the West Town State Bank Building at 2400 W. Madison. In March 1941, the station, along with WCRW and WEDC, was moved to 1240 kHz, as part of the implementation of the North American Regional Broadcasting Agreement.

In 1944, WSBC was sold to the J. Miller Advertising Agency for $100,000. In 1954, the station was sold to Louis Lee for $180,000. In 1976, control of the station was passed to Louis Lee's son, Danny Lee.

=== 1990s to today ===
WSBC's owners purchased timeshare partner WCRW for $564,375, plus $160,000 for a non-compete agreement, and WCRW signed off for the last time on June 17, 1996. The second timeshare partner, WEDC, ceased operations in 1997, and WSBC began broadcasting fulltime from WEDC's transmitter site.

In 1998, WSBC was sold to Newsweb Corporation for $5,550,000. Some of the station's programs were simulcast on 1470 WCFJ in Chicago Heights, Illinois. In June 1998, WSBC began airing LesBiGay Radio weekday evenings. The program was heard on WSBC until April 2001, and was simulcast on WCFJ.

In 2024, Newsweb transferred WSBC, along with station WCPT, to Heartland Signal for one dollar.

The station broadcasts in Ukrainian since 2022.
