= Newsweb Corporation =

American media company

Newsweb Corporation is a printer of ethnic and alternative newspapers in the United States, based in Chicago, Illinois. The company also owns AM 750 WNDZ. Newsweb was founded in 1971 by Chicago entrepreneur, political activist, and philanthropist Fred Eychaner to continue his printing business.

== Radio ==
In early 2004, the company purchased 99.9 FM WRZA from Entravision and in late 2004, the company purchased three suburban Chicago radio stations from Spanish Broadcasting System: 92.5 FM WDEK, 92.7 FM WKIE and 92.7 FM WKIF. The trimulcast was formerly the home to Energy 92.7&5. WKIF was broken away from the trimulcast and WRZA took its place. WKIF became a CNN Radio affiliate. The new trimulcast became a variety hits format as Nine FM, and the station later became a split-format station with Nine FM during the day and Dance Hits format Dance Factory at night. Dance Factory is operated by TKC Entertainment, which leases the air time from Newsweb. Nine FM was discontinued as of October 19, 2008, in favor of Progressive Talk simulcast with sister station WCPT.

WCPT-FM 92.7, WCPQ 99.9, and WCPY 92.5 was a trimulcast which simulcast WCPT between 5 AM and 9 PM, and operates Dance Hits format Dance Factory at night.

On June 2, 2014, WCPT-FM and 99.9 WCPQ broke away from the Progressive Talk simulcast and changed their daytime format to Polish, branded as "Polski FM". WCPT-FM then swapped callsigns with 92.5 WCPY in DeKalb, which remained part of the Progressive Talk simulcast.

Newsweb Corporation owns WCPT which was an Air America and CNN Radio affiliate, and also includes locally hosted Progressive talk programming. WCPT operates on 820 AM in the Chicago area.

Newsweb purchased AM 850 WAIT in 2004. Newsweb also owns WSBC 1240 AM and WNDZ 750 AM, WCPY 92.7 FM and formerly owned WCFJ 1470 AM, until surrendering the station's license to the Federal Communications Commission on November 9, 2015.

In May 2018, Newsweb sold WCPQ to Bible Broadcasting Network for $5,099,000. WCPT-FM was sold to Educational Media Foundation for $1.6 million in autumn of 2018.

In August 2019, Newsweb sold WAIT's transmitter site to McHenry County College, and the station was taken off the air. Newsweb surrendered WAIT's license on July 15, 2020, and the FCC cancelled the license on July 21.

== Television ==
Newsweb had formerly owned the Gary, Indiana-licensed UPN affiliate for Chicago, WPWR-TV, until 2003, when they sold the station to Fox Television Stations.

In 2006, they also sold Denver UPN affiliate KTVD to Gannett, who made it part of a duopoly with Gannett's local NBC affiliate, KUSA-TV. Newsweb retained KTVD's former satellite station in Sterling, Colorado, KUPN (now KCDO-TV), which was operated as independent station from 2010 to 2020, and again since 2021. The company later sold KCDO-TV, which was briefly affiliated with Grit, to Scripps in November 2020.

Coincidentally, both WPWR and KTVD are affiliates of MyNetworkTV.
