= Fred Eychaner =

American businessman and philanthropist

- Born: 1944 (age 81–82); DeKalb, Illinois, US
- Occupation: Businessman
- Known for: Chairman, Newsweb Corporation
- Awards: Chicago LGBT Hall of Fame (2015)

Fred Eychaner (born 1944) is an American businessman and philanthropist.

Eychaner is the chairman of Newsweb Corporation. He was included in Chicago magazine's 2014 list of the 100 most powerful Chicagoans. In 2005, the Chicago Tribune estimated his wealth at $500 million. In 2015, he was inducted into the Chicago LGBT Hall of Fame.

Eychaner is a major donor to Democratic campaigns, gay rights advocacy groups, and arts organizations.

Eychaner is gay and is married to Danny Leung.

== Early life and education ==
Eychaner was born to a middle-class Methodist family in DeKalb, Illinois, the son of Mildred (Lovett) and Howard Franklin Eychaner. His father owned a moving and storage business. He has three siblings, including Iowa businessman Rich Eychaner. He attended the Medill School of Journalism.

== Business interests ==
In the late 1970s, Eychaner founded Metrowest Corporation, which would eventually become Newsweb, which prints a wide variety of newspapers. It was in 1982 that, through Metrowest, he launched Chicago television station WPWR-TV Channel 50 in Chicago. It was also in 1982 that, alongside Chicago White Sox owners Jerry Reinsdorf and Eddie Einhorn, he was involved in the launching of the subscription sports television service Sportsvision. The service was sold to Cablevision in 1984, which converted it into a basic cable service. In 2002, WPWR was sold to Fox Television Stations for a reported $425 million. Then, in 2005, through Newsweb, he launched Chicago radio station WCPT (820 AM), branded as Chicago's Progressive Talk.

== Philanthropy ==
He serves as president of the Alphawood Foundation, a charitable organization that granted £20 million to the School of Oriental and African Studies, University of London in 2013. Eychaner has also donated more than $25 million to the Clinton Foundation. He is credited with getting the long-delayed FDR Four Freedoms Park on Roosevelt Island in New York constructed.

In November 2013, Alphawood announced a $2 million matching grant to help jumpstart construction of the Bloomingdale Trail in Chicago.

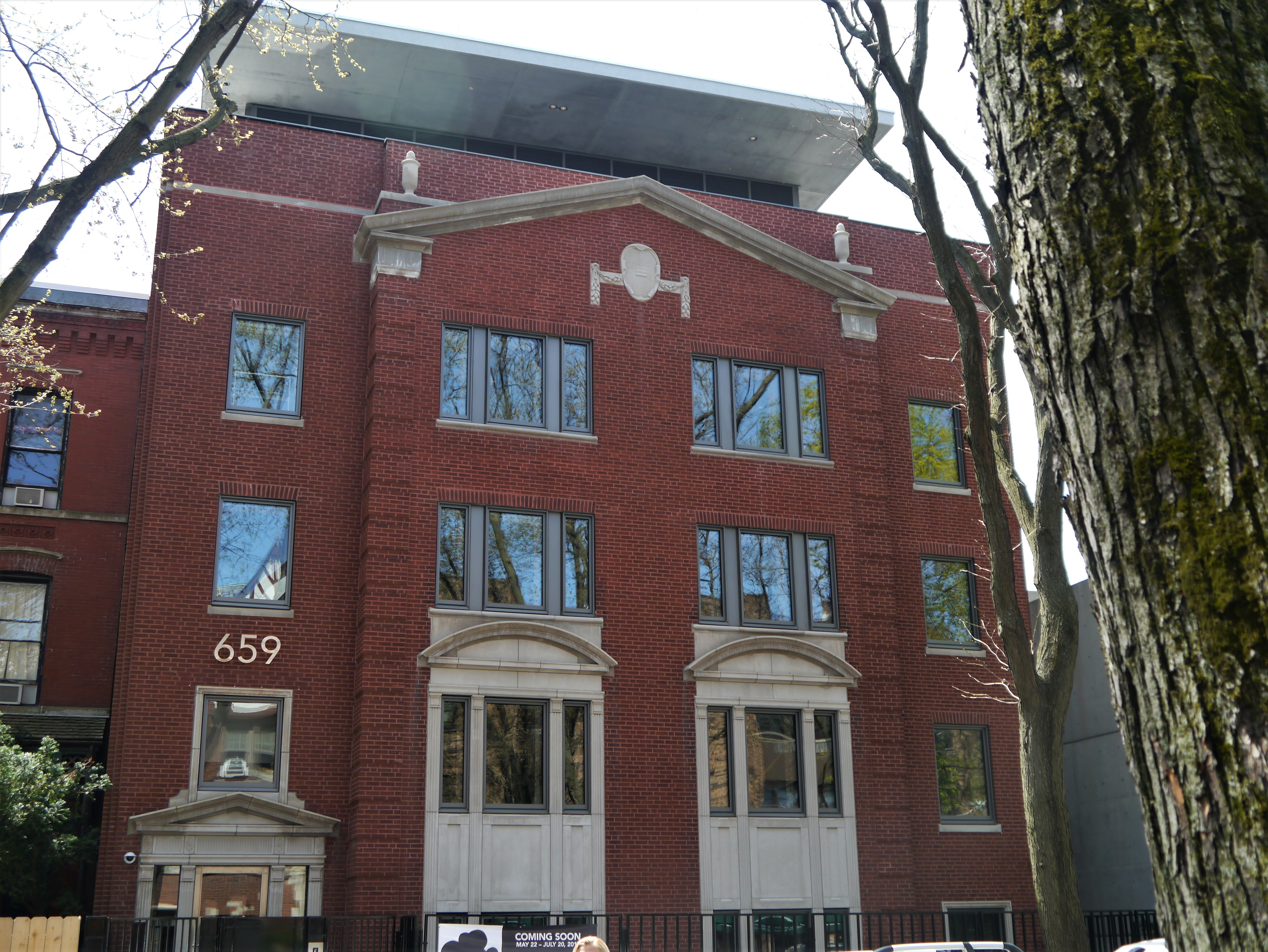
Wrightwood 659 in 2019

Eychaner commissioned architect Tadao Ando to design his house in Chicago, which was completed in 1997, and the Wrightwood 659 gallery next door, which officially opened in 2018.

He has served on various committees at the Metropolitan Museum of Art, the Art Institute of Chicago, and is an established donor at the Rubin Museum of Himalayan Art.

== Political activities ==
He has been a top Democratic donor for several cycles and in the 2012 election cycle was the top donor to Democratic super PACs, giving more than $14 million.

As of August 2026, Eychaner spent $17.2 million in support of Democratic candidates in the 2026 United States elections.

== Boards ==
He serves on the board of the Joffrey Ballet, and of the Art Institute of Chicago. He is also a trustee of the Asian Art Museum in San Francisco.

In September 2010, President Barack Obama appointed Eychaner a general trustee to the board of trustees of the John F. Kennedy Center for the Performing Arts.

== Honors ==
Eychaner was awarded the 2021 National Medal of Arts. In 2026, the Chicago History Museum selected him for the Daniel H. Burnham Making History Award for Distinction in Visionary Leadership.
