= Jerry Reinsdorf =

American sports executive (born 1936)

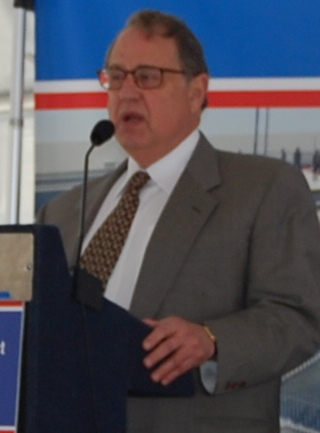
- Reinsdorf in 2011
- Born: Jerry Michael Reinsdorf; February 25, 1936 (age 90); New York City, U.S.
- Education: George Washington University (BA); Northwestern University (JD)
- Known for: Owner of Chicago Bulls and Chicago White Sox
- Spouse: Martyl Rifkin (m. 1956; died 2021)
- Children: 4
- Awards: 6× NBA champion (as owner) 1991, 1992, 1993, 1996, 1997, 1998 with Bulls; World Series champion (as owner) 2005 with White Sox; Naismith Memorial Basketball HOF (Class of 2016)

Jerry Michael Reinsdorf (born February 25, 1936) is an American sports executive and businessman who is the owner of the NBA's Chicago Bulls and MLB's Chicago White Sox. He started his professional life as a tax attorney with the Internal Revenue Service. He has been the owner of the White Sox and Bulls for nearly 40 years. As of August 2026, his net worth was estimated at US$2.3 billion.

He made his initial fortune in real estate, taking advantage of the Frank Lyon Co. v. United States decision by the United States Supreme Court, which allowed economic owners of realty to sell property and lease it back, while transferring the tax deduction for depreciation to the title owner.

As the owner and chairman of the Chicago Bulls since 1985, he oversaw a turnaround in the franchise's fortunes, culminating in six NBA Championships in the 1990s (1991–1993 and 1996–1998). He is controversial for his involvement (along with Jerry Krause) in breaking up the championship team by not hiring back Phil Jackson. He signed Michael Jordan as a baseball player during his sabbatical from basketball. He also moved the Bulls from Chicago Stadium to the United Center.

After Reinsdorf's purchase of the White Sox in 1981, the franchise made the playoffs in 1983 for the first time since 1959, and won the World Series for the first time since 1917 in 2005, after which they did not win another playoff series until 2026. Reinsdorf moved the White Sox from Comiskey Park to New Comiskey Park in 1991 (now known as Rate Field). In both sporting endeavors, he has developed a reputation as an anti-labor union hardliner. Since the early 1990s, he has been considered one of the most influential basketball owners. He has been influential in instituting the salary cap and revenue sharing. On April 4, 2016, Reinsdorf was elected to the Naismith Memorial Basketball Hall of Fame as a contributor.

In 2024, the White Sox lost a modern MLB record 121 games, which led to recently increased criticism of Reinsdorf. In addition, Reinsdorf has drawn criticism for emphasizing profitability over winning during his ownership of the Chicago Bulls, particularly after the retirement of Michael Jordan.

== Early life and college ==
Reinsdorf was born to a Jewish family in Brooklyn, New York, and is the son of a sewing machine salesman. He attended Erasmus Hall High School in Brooklyn, Reinsdorf was in the stands the day Jackie Robinson debuted for the Brooklyn Dodgers, breaking the major leagues' longstanding "color line".

Reinsdorf earned a bachelor's degree from George Washington University. where he became a member of Alpha Epsilon Pi. He subsequently moved to Chicago in 1957. Reinsdorf became a certified public accountant and lawyer as well as a registered mortgage underwriter and a certified review appraiser. He leveraged a full scholarship offer from the University of Chicago Law School into a scholarship from the Northwestern University School of Law.

== Early business career ==
Reinsdorf worked as an IRS lawyer after graduating from Northwestern in 1960, where his first case concerned the tax delinquency of Bill Veeck, who at the time owned the White Sox. In 1964, he went into private practice. He developed a specialty in real estate partnership tax shelters. He sold his business interests in the real estate partnership in 1973 and formed Balcor, which raised US$650 million to invest in buildings under construction. He sold Balcor in 1982 for $102 million to Shearson Lehman Brothers, the investment banking and brokerage arm of American Express. However, he continued to be President of the company for several years thereafter.

== Sports ownership ==
=== New purchases ===
In 1981, Reinsdorf purchased the Chicago White Sox for $19 million. The purchase was brokered by American National Bank who arranged for a limited partnership. He followed previous eccentric White Sox owners Charles Comiskey, who was known as a miser, and Veeck, who was known as a prankster who gutted the team by trading away promising prospects. Soon after buying the White Sox, he signed Greg Luzinski and Carlton Fisk. He also tripled the team promotional budget and increased the number of team scouts from 12 to 20. By the 1983 Major League Baseball season the White Sox made the playoffs with the best record in the Major Leagues. The team initially signed a television deal with the newly founded Sportsvision under the new leadership of Chairman Reinsdorf and Vice Chairman Eddie Einhorn, but that arrangement quickly fizzled. Einhorn continued as Vice Chairman of the White Sox until his death in 2016.

In 1985, Reinsdorf purchased the Chicago Bulls as part of a syndicate for $16 million, following in the footsteps of Einhorn, who had purchased the United States Football League's Chicago Blitz franchise in 1984. In the months prior to the purchase, Milwaukee businessman Marvin Fishman had been awarded a $16.2 million judgment against the Bulls. Fishman had been illegally blocked from purchasing the team in 1972. Reinsdorf purchased the team from an ownership group that included Lamar Hunt, George Steinbrenner, Walter Shorenstein, Jonathan Kovler, Lester Crown, Philip Klutznick, and the estate of Arthur Wirtz, and he held a $9.2 million controlling interest in the team. Reinsdorf's share of 56.8% of the team was purchased from Klutznick, Steinbrenner, Shorenstein and the estate of Wirtz. His purchase ended an era in which the Bulls were managed by committee with decisions by conference call, verdicts by vote. Reinsdorf acquired his majority interests on March 11, 1985, and Kovler sold his 7% stake in the team on January 29, 1986, bringing Reinsdorf's interest to 63%. The following week Reinsdorf ousted Rod Thorn as general manager and replaced him with Jerry Krause.

Led by Jordan, who was drafted the year before Reinsdorf purchased the team, the team's popularity and on-court success rapidly improved. The Bulls drafted Horace Grant and Scottie Pippen and traded for Bill Cartwright to join John Paxson and Michael Jordan under the tutelage of head coach Doug Collins. In 1989, the franchise promoted then-Bulls assistant coach Phil Jackson to be Collins's replacement at the team's helm. Jackson would prove to be the final core addition, catalyzing the Bulls' dynastic championship run of six NBA championship titles in eight seasons (1991–1998). Whereas before Reinsdorf's purchase the team had an average attendance of 6,365 in the 17,339-seat Chicago Stadium, from November 20, 1987, through Jordan's 1998 retirement, the Bulls sold out every game, including their first few seasons at the United Center, where they play to this very day.

=== Ownership history ===
"The North Siders always tended to look down on South Siders ... Part of being a White Sox fan is you hate the Cubs."

— Jerry Reinsdorf

The White Sox won American League regular season Division Championships in 1983, 1993, 2000, 2005, 2008, and 2021 under Reinsdorf, and won the 2005 World Series. They also led the central division at the conclusion of the strike-shortened 1994 Major League Baseball season. The World Series victory made him only the third owner in the history of North American sports to win a championship in two different sports, and boosted the value of the franchise to over $300 million. Reinsdorf signed Jordan to a minor league contract with the White Sox after Jordan's announcement that he wanted to play baseball, a move many thought was solely due to Jordan's drawing power. Reinsdorf had tried to convince Jordan not to give up basketball, but had not attempted to make Jordan the highest paid player in the game, as some felt he should have.

As both a basketball and baseball owner, Reinsdorf has been described by Time as a "cheapskate." As a baseball owner, he has a reputation as one of the most militant, anti-union, hard-line owners. Newsweek described him as "one of the hardest heads in the 1994 baseball strike." In the baseball offseason between the 1992 and 1993 seasons, he completely abstained from the free agent market. Reinsdorf was one of the last holdouts to the 1996 labor agreement that instituted the salary cap while retaining arbitration rights for the players. His 1996 signing of Albert Belle made news because of his widely publicized general opposition to spiraling player salaries. The $55 million signing was a turning point in the decision by the baseball owners to agree to revenue sharing. The signing made Reinsdorf the employer of the highest paid Major League Baseball player and highest paid professional basketball player (Jordan) at the same time. Reinsdorf had just re-signed Jordan after the 1995–96 NBA season. Jordan had been underpaid for most of his career, but Reinsdorf did not feel he could justify the $30 million salary from a business standpoint. Even his most successful baseball team was not highly paid: the 2005 World Series champion White Sox had the 13th highest payroll of the 30 Major League Baseball teams.

After Reinsdorf purchased the team in 1981, the White Sox experienced erosion of fan and media support. He complained about old Comiskey Park with its foibles such as numerous obstructed view seats and threatened to move the White Sox. Among his threats was moving the team to Itasca or Addison, Illinois in DuPage County. Reinsdorf, through his real estate business, purchased 100 acres (400,000 m^{2}) in Addison. Chicago Mayor Harold Washington lobbied the Illinois legislature, and subsequently then-Illinois Governor James R. Thompson promoted a package of incentives to retain the team in Chicago. The state floated bonds to build New Comiskey Park and let Reinsdorf keep all parking and concession revenues, as well as the $5 million per year from 89 skyboxes. Reinsdorf and Chicago Blackhawks owner William Wirtz contributed $175 million to fund the construction of the largest arena in the United States. When the United Center opened in 1994 all of the skyboxes were leased for up to eight years. As per the collective bargaining agreement, Reinsdorf was allowed to exclude 60% of luxury suite revenue from "basketball-related income" and thus it is not part of the revenue sharing income.

"Jerry is clearly the most powerful [Major League Baseball] owner."

— Donald Fehr, executive director of the Major League Baseball Players Association

Reinsdorf is a powerful baseball owner who in 1988 stopped the sale of the Texas Rangers and later influenced the sale of the Seattle Mariners. Edward Gaylord and Gaylord Entertainment Company had first attempted to buy the Rangers in 1985. Reinsdorf was also said to be largely responsible for the ousting of Fay Vincent as the Commissioner of Baseball in 1992. He had previously undermined Vincent by employing Richard Ravitch as the league's labor negotiator at a salary higher than Vincent's. By the early 1990s, Reinsdorf and acting Baseball commissioner (as well as Milwaukee Brewers owner) Bud Selig had assumed baseball's mantle of power from Atlanta Braves owner, Ted Turner, and New York Yankees owner, George Steinbrenner, who had in turn taken over the sport from Brooklyn/Los Angeles Dodgers owner Walter O'Malley, St. Louis Cardinals owner Gussie Busch, and Oakland Athletics owner Charlie O. Finley.

In the 1980s, Reinsdorf, Bud Selig and the American League President colluded to dissuade the Philadelphia Phillies from signing Lance Parrish who was a Detroit Tigers free agent. During the strike, Reinsdorf, who was an anti-union hard-liner, was so pessimistic that he did not expect baseball to resume until the 1996 Major League Baseball season. In the early 1990s he was able to get new stadiums (United Center and New Comiskey Park) for his teams.

Some fans and columnists have accused Reinsdorf of breaking up the championship Bulls team after their third straight title and sixth in eight years, claiming the Bulls could have competed for more titles with Michael Jordan, Scottie Pippen and good support from the rest of the team that in the eight-year span included Dennis Rodman, Horace Grant, Toni Kukoč, Ron Harper, B. J. Armstrong, and coach Phil Jackson. Some accounts claim that because Jackson feuded with both Reinsdorf and Krause and because both Jordan and Pippen were linked to Jackson, the team was broken up. Forbes describes the scenario as an example of owner greed. Many note that Phil Jackson's decision not to return as coach and Jordan's retirement during the 1998–99 NBA season lockout impacted the decisions of several players on whether to return to Chicago. While Reinsdorf had held out hope that he could convince Jackson and Jordan to return and thus had introduced Tim Floyd as President of Chicago Bulls Basketball Operations instead of head coach, according to film footage from documentary series The Last Dance, Krause had made it clear to Jackson that he was not wanted back.

Reinsdorf was one of two bidders for the Phoenix Coyotes that would commit to not relocating the team. On July 29, 2009, Reinsdorf and his group were approved for ownership of the Coyotes for $148 million. In August 2009, it was reported that Jerry Reinsdorf & Ice Edge LLC had dropped its bid for the Coyotes, leaving only Balsillie and the NHL as bidders for the team. The NHL bid ultimately prevailed, however the league stated it wished to re-sell the franchise as soon as possible. On March 24, 2010, it was reported that Reinsdorf was once again a possible buyer for the Phoenix Coyotes. Reinsdorf had been working out an arrangement to make the deal more feasible with the municipality of Glendale, Arizona. As late as August 2011, negotiations between Reinsdorf and the City of Glendale were still in process for the purchase of the Coyotes. However, in 2013, the Coyotes were sold to IceArizona, a group of investors that did not include Reinsdorf. The Coyotes would later rebrand themselves as the Arizona Coyotes in order to expand their reach to the greater Arizona region in 2014, though they would ultimately relocate to nearby Utah to become the Utah Mammoth and potentially disband the franchise entirely after failed attempts to succeed with multiple new owners since then in 2024.

=== Legacy ===
Reinsdorf is largely responsible for the revenue sharing of the internet rights of Major League Baseball in which all teams have shared equally since Major League Baseball Advanced Media (known as BAM) was established in 2000. Reinsdorf also endeavored to sell the naming rights to the New Comiskey Park to U.S. Cellular in a $68 million 20-year deal that funded a 7-year $85 million overhaul of the stadium that ended prior to the 2008 Major League Baseball season. The overhaul included the removal of top rows of the upper deck, replacement of the baby blue seats with traditionally-colored green ones and dozens of other upgrades. Prior to the seven-year overhaul, the 2001 White Sox barely broke even financially with a $700,000 operating profit on revenues of $101.33 million.

Reinsdorf won a major revenue sharing legal battle with other NBA owners over the Chicago Bulls broadcasts on WGN-TV. The 55 game schedule on the superstation for an audience of 35 million competed with the NBA broadcasts, but Reinsdorf was permitted to maintain the contract. As recently as 2004, the Bulls continued to be the NBA's most profitable team, earning $49 million in operating income and having an estimated valuation of $356 million.

Reinsdorf feels that if Major League Baseball Players Association chief Donald Fehr had not opposed steroid testing, baseball would have taken a stand against steroid use much sooner. He feels that in the end this delayed action will cost some players election into the National Baseball Hall of Fame.

Reinsdorf will also be remembered as the owner of the 2024 White Sox, the team that broke the modern Major League Baseball single-season loss record, previously held by the 1962 New York Mets.

== Awards and honors ==
Sports ownership

- Six-time NBA champion (as owner of the Bulls)
- 2005 World Series champion (as owner of the White Sox)
- Three-time Midwest League champion (as owner of the Appleton Foxes)

Halls of Fame

- Naismith Memorial Basketball Hall of Fame (Class of 2016 – as a contributor)
- Appleton, Wisconsin Baseball Hall of Fame (Class of 2006)

Other

- 1990 Golden Plate Award of the American Academy of Achievement
- 2011 Jefferson Award for Public Service

== Charity work ==
Reinsdorf has been involved in Chicago Mayor Richard M. Daley's initiative to improve standardized test scores in the 559 Chicago Public Schools. He has also been involved in other extensive charitable work including those of CharitaBulls and White Sox Charities. His philanthropy and community development have been notable in the Near West Side community area near the United Center. The White Sox Charities have donated to the Chicago Park District with particular purpose of funding construction and maintenance baseball and softball fields.

== Other business dealings ==
He has been a member of the board of directors of Shearson Lehman Brothers, Inc., the Northwestern University Law School Alumni Association, LaSalle Bank, EQ Office and numerous other corporations and charities. He currently serves as a Life Trustee of Northwestern University.

Throughout the years, Reinsdorf has been active in the affairs of baseball, serving on the Executive Council and Ownership, Long Range Planning, Restructuring, Expansion, Equal Opportunity, Strategic Planning, Legislative and Labor Policy Committees of Major League Baseball, he also serves on the Boards of MLB Advanced Media and MLB Enterprises.

In 2013, Reinsdorf partnered with Mark Sullivan, Noah Kroloff, Dennis Burke, David Aguilar, and John Kaites to found Global Security and Innovative Strategies.

== Personal life ==
In 1956, while they were both students at George Washington University, he married Martyl Rifkin (March 4, 1936 – June 28, 2021). She was born in Denver, Colorado, the daughter of Milton and Vivette Rifkin (née Ravel); the Rifkin family moved to Chicago in 1944, and Martyl attended Morgan Park High School. Their union resulted in four children, Susan, David, Michael, and Jonathan.

== See also ==
- List of NBA team owners
- List of National Basketball Association team presidents
