= Mass media in Chicago =

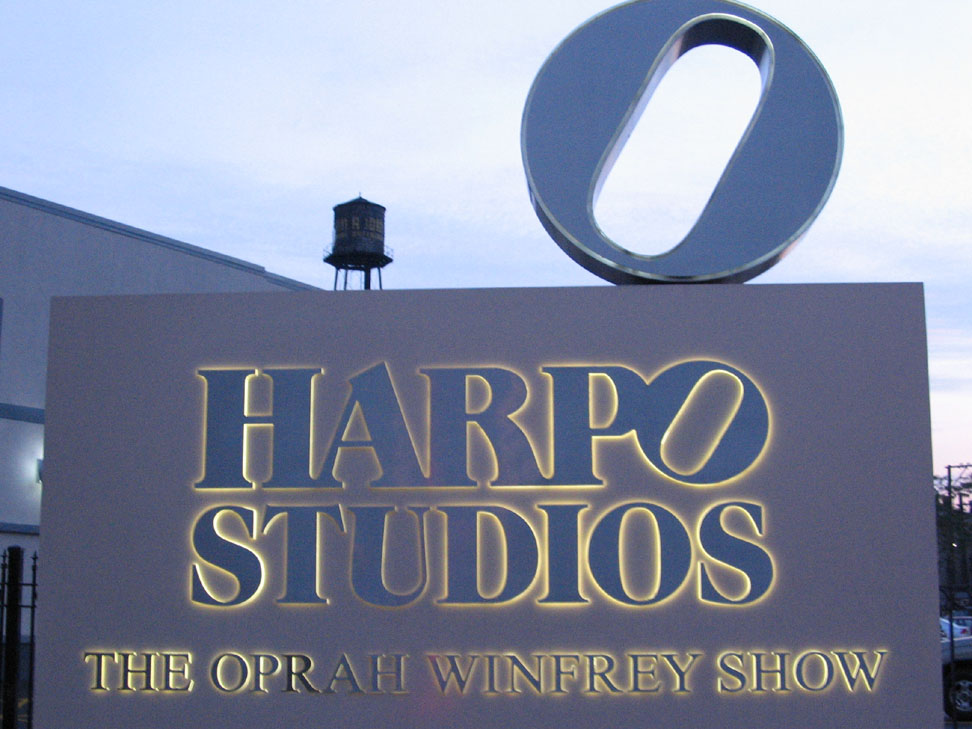
Harpo Studios, home of talk show host Oprah Winfrey

The Chicago metropolitan area (the Chicago market) commands the third-largest media market in the United States after New York City and Los Angeles and the largest inland market. All of the major U.S. television networks have subsidiaries in Chicago. WGN-TV, which is owned by the Tribune Media Company, is carried (with some programming differences) as "WGN America" on cable and satellite nationwide. Sun-Times Media Group is also headquartered in Chicago, which, along with Tribune Publishing, are some of the largest owners of daily newspapers in the country.

== History ==
Journalists, novelists, architects, engineers, business tycoons, scientists, poets, sports teams, criminals, and millions of laborers shaped Chicago's national and international reputation. Images and representations are important means by which the city is known and negotiated. During the years of rapid urbanization between 1890 and 1930, numerous daily newspapers presented the most important and pervasive versions of the city.

Among the significant innovations of Chicago's newspapers in these years that shaped the idea of the city was the emergence of the local color columnist. Groeninger (2005) examines the role of columnists in Chicago newspapers in creating a "city of the mind." After a review of the literature on images of cities, the relationship of newspapers to modern city life in the thought of Robert Park, and the world of Chicago's newspapers at the turn of the 20th century, detailed studies of a number of the most important columnists of the era follow. George Ade's column of the 1890s in the Daily News, "Stories of the Streets and of the Town," presented a view of Chicago from the perspective of migrants from the small towns of the Midwest. In the same decade Finley Peter Dunne's column in the Evening Post, featuring the fictional Irish barkeeper, Mr. Dooley, offered readers a literary version of the Irish working-class neighborhood of Bridgeport. Ring Lardner's Tribune sports column of the teens, "In the Wake of the News," satirized not only Chicagoans obsession with sports, but also the middle-class culture of opera, musical theater, and the newspaper itself. Several columns in the black newspaper, The Whip, offered images of Bronzeville in the 1920s that both reflected and helped shape the experience of African-Americans on the South Side of Chicago. Ben Hecht's "1001 Afternoons in Chicago" column in the Daily News expressed a new, anti-Victorian sensibility in the post-war era, but his most enduring contributions to the image of Chicago were on the stage and in the new medium of film. The columnists who wrote about everyday life in the city were the most distinctive and powerful newspaper voices in shaping the idea of Chicago and the civic personality of the city itself.

== Newspapers ==
Two major daily newspapers are published in Chicago, the Chicago Tribune and the Chicago Sun-Times. The former has the larger circulation. There are also a number of regional and special-interest newspapers such as the Daily Herald (Arlington Heights), SouthtownStar, the Chicago Defender, RedEye, Third Coast Press, Hypertext Magazine and the Chicago Reader.

=== Daily ===
- Chicago Sun-Times
- Chicago Tribune

=== Weekly ===
- Chicago Crusader
- Chicago Defender
- Chicago News
- Chicago Reader
- N'Digo
- Newcity

=== Community ===
- Austin Voice
- Austin Weekly News
- Back-of-Yards Journal
- Beverly News
- Beverly Review
- Bridgeport News
- Brighton Park Life
- Bulgaria SEGA Newspaper (Bulgarian Community Newspaper - Est 2005)
- Chicago Citizen Newspapers
- Chicago News Russian - Новости Чикаго
- Chicago Free Press
- The Chicago Independent Bulletin
- Chicago Journal
- The Chicago Maroon
- Chicago Shimpo
- Chicago Standard
- Clear Ridge Reporter
- Dziennik Związkowy (Polish Daily News)
- Edgebrook Times
- Edison Review
- Exito
- Extra
- The Gate
- The Gazette
- Greek Star
- Hyde Park Herald
- Inside-Booster
- Korean News
- Korean Times
- La Raza
- La Voz de Chicago
- Lawndale News
- Logan Square Times
- Lumpen
- McKinley Park Life
- Mt. Greenwood Express
- Nadig Press-Journal
- Near North News
- New Metro News
- News-Star
- North Lawndale Community News
- North Loop News
- Northwest Leader-Post
- Norwood Review
- River North News
- Sauganash Sounds
- Scottsdale Independent
- Shoreland News
- Skyline
- Super Express USA
- Third Coast Press
- Tri-City Journal
- Ukrainske Slovo (Ukrainian Community Newspaper - Est 2002)
- Westside Journal
- World Journal

=== Business, legal, entertainment and other local periodicals ===
- Bar Fly
- Chicago magazine
- Chicago Computer Guide
- Chicago Daily Law Bulletin
- Chicago Educator
- Chicago Innerview
- Chicago Journal of International Law
- Chicago Life
- Chicago Parent
- The Chicago Reporter
- Chicagoland Golf
- Crain's Chicago Business
- Jettison Quarterly
- PerformInk
- South Shore Parent
- Third Coast Review
- Time Out Chicago
- Windy City Times

=== Defunct newspapers ===
- Chicago Conservator
- Chicago Daily News
- Chicago Free Press
- Chicago Inter Ocean
- Chicago's American
- Denní Hlasatel
- Gay Chicago
- Gay Chicago News
- RedEye
- Red Streak
- Southeast Chicago Observer
- UR Chicago

== Broadcast radio ==
The Chicago metropolitan area is currently the third-largest radio market in the United States as ranked by Nielsen Media Research. The following list includes full-power stations licensed to Chicago proper, in addition to area suburbs.

Currently, radio stations that primarily serve the Chicago metropolitan area include:

=== AM stations ===
- 560 WIND Chicago (Conservative talk)
- 640 WMFN Peotone (Polish/dance)
- 670 WSCR Chicago (Sports)^{1}
- 720 WGN Chicago (Talk)^{1}
- 750 WNDZ Portage, IN (Brokered)
- 780 WBBM Chicago (All-news)^{1}
- 820 WCPT Willow Springs (Progressive talk)
- 890 WLS Chicago (Conservative talk)^{1}
- 930 WKBM Sandwich (Relevant Radio)
- 950 WSFS Chicago (Relevant Radio)
- 1000 WMVP Chicago (Sports)^{1}
- 1030 WNVR Vernon Hills (Polish)
- 1080 WNWI Oak Lawn (Ethnic)
- 1110 WXES Chicago (ESNE Radio)^{2}
- 1160 WYLL Chicago (Christian)
- 1200 WRTO Chicago (Spanish sports)
- 1220 WKRS Waukegan (Spanish sports)
- 1230 WJOB Hammond, IN (Talk/sports)
- 1240 WSBC Chicago (Variety)
- 1270 WWCA Gary, IN (Relevant Radio)
- 1300 WRDZ La Grange (Polish)
- 1320 WKAN Kankakee (Talk)
- 1330 WKTA Evanston (Ethnic)
- 1340 WJOL Joliet (Talk)
- 1370 WLTH Gary, IN (Community)
- 1390 WGRB Chicago (Gospel)
- 1410 WRMN Elgin (Talk)
- 1420 WIMS Michigan City (Talk/classic hits)
- 1490 WEUR Oak Park (Polish/ethnic)
- 1500 WAKE Valparaiso, IN (Oldies)
- 1500 WPJX Zion (Heavy metal)
- 1510 WWHN Joliet (Urban AC)^{2}
- 1530 WCKG Elmhurst (Sports)^{2}
- 1570 WBGX Harvey (Gospel)
- 1590 WCGO Evanston (Talk/Korean/Russian)
- 1690 WVON Berwyn (Urban talk)

^{1} clear-channel station
^{2} daytime-only station

=== FM stations ===
Asterisk (*) indicates a non-commercial (public radio/campus/educational) broadcast.

- 87.7 WRME-LD Chicago (Oldies)
- 88.1 WCRX Chicago (College/dance/CHR/hip hop)*
- 88.1 WLRA Lockport (College/variety)*
- 88.3 WZRD Chicago (College/freeform)*
- 88.3 WXAV Chicago (College/variety)*
- 88.5 WHPK Hyde Park (College/variety)*
- 88.7 WLUW Chicago (Campus/Community)*
- 88.9 WMXM Lake Forest (College/variety)*
- 89.1 WOKL Round Lake Beach (K-Love)*
- 89.1 WONC Naperville (College/Album-oriented rock)*
- 89.3 WNUR-FM Evanston (College/variety)*
- 89.7 WONU Kankakee (Contemporary Christian)*
- 90.1 WMBI-FM Chicago (Moody Radio)*
- 90.9 WDCB Glen Ellyn (NPR/jazz)*
- 91.1 WBEW Chesterton, Indiana (Urban contemporary)*
- 91.5 WBEZ Chicago (NPR/talk)*
- 91.7 WZKL Woodstock (K-Love)*
- 92.3 WPWX Hammond, IN (Mainstream urban)
- 92.5 WCLR DeKalb (K-Love)*
- 92.7 WCPY Arlington Heights (Polish/dance)
- 93.1 WXRT Chicago (Adult album alternative)
- 93.5 WVIV-FM Lemont (Spanish CHR)
- 93.9 WLIT-FM Chicago (Soft AC)
- 94.3 WAWE Glendale Heights (Air1)*
- 94.7 WLS-FM Chicago (Classic hits)
- 95.1 WIIL Union Grove, WI (Active rock)
- 95.5 WCHI-FM Chicago (Mainstream rock)
- 95.9 WERV-FM Aurora (Classic alternative)
- 96.3 WBBM-FM Chicago (Contemporary hit radio)
- 96.7 WSSR Joliet (Hot AC)
- 96.9 WWDV Zion (Classic rock)
- 97.1 WDRV Chicago (Classic rock)
- 97.9 WCKL Chicago (K-Love)*
- 98.3 WCCQ Crest Hill (Country)
- 98.7 WFMT Chicago (Classical)
- 99.5 WUSN Chicago (Country)
- 99.9 WYHI Park Forest (BBN)*
- 100.3 WTBC-FM Chicago (Gold 1990s-2010s CHR)
- 100.7 WRXQ Coal City (Classic rock)
- 101.1 WKQX Chicago (Alternative rock)
- 101.9 WTMX Skokie (Hot AC)
- 102.3 WXLC Waukegan (Country)
- 102.3 WYCA Crete (Gospel)
- 102.7 WVAZ Oak Park (Urban AC)
- 103.1 WPNA-FM Niles (Polish music)
- 103.5 WKSC-FM Chicago (Contemporary hit radio)
- 104.3 WBMX Chicago (Classic hip hop)
- 104.7 WCFL Morris (Contemporary Christian)*
- 105.1 WOJO Evanston (Regional Mexican)
- 105.9 WCFS-FM Elmwood Park (All-news)
- 106.3 WSRB Lansing (Urban AC)
- 107.1 WCXP-LP (Community radio)
- 107.5 WGCI-FM Chicago (Urban contemporary)
- 107.9 WLEY-FM Aurora (Regional Mexican)

== Television ==
The Chicago metropolitan area is currently defined by Nielsen Media Research as the third-largest television market in the United States, with all of the major U.S. television networks having affiliates serving the region.

Currently, television stations that primarily serve the Chicago metropolitan area include:

=== Broadcast ===
- 2 WBBM-TV Chicago (CBS)*
- 5 WMAQ-TV Chicago (NBC)*
- 7 WLS-TV Chicago (ABC)*
- 9 WGN-TV Chicago (The CW)*
- 11 WTTW Chicago (PBS)
- 13 WOCK-CD Chicago (Shop LC)
- 23 WWME-CD Chicago (MeTV)*
- 24 WPVN-CD Chicago (Azteca América)*
- 26 WCIU-TV Chicago (Independent)
- 32 WFLD Chicago (Fox)*
- 34 WEDE-CD Arlington Heights (Independent)
- 35 WWTO-TV Naperville (TBN)*
- 38 WCPX-TV Chicago (Ion Television)*
- 40 WESV-LD Chicago (Estrella TV)*
- 44 WSNS-TV Chicago (Telemundo)*
- 48 WMEU-CD Chicago (Independent)
- 50 WPWR-TV Gary, IN (MyNetworkTV)*
- 60 WXFT-DT Aurora (UniMás)*
- 61 WCHU-LD Oakwood Hills (Infomercials)
- 62 WJYS Hammond, IN (Independent)
- 66 WGBO-DT Joliet (Univision)*

Asterisk (*) indicates channel is a network owned-and-operated station.

=== Cable ===
- Chicago Access Network Television
- Chicagoland Television
- NBC Sports Chicago
- NewsNation

Government cable channels for Chicago are also carried on channels 23, 25, and 49.

Although EVINE Live does have over-the-air affiliates, it is not available via broadcast television in Chicago; however, is available on Comcast on channels 89 and 164 and RCN channel 193 in the Chicago market.

== Online ==
- Better (formerly Make It Better)
- The Beachwood Reporter (defunct)
- Block Club Chicago
- Chicago Daily Observer
- City Bureau
- Chicagoist (part of the Gothamist network – now defunct)
- ChicagoNow (Chicago Tribune-owned weblog community)
- DNAinfo Chicago (defunct)
- Gapers Block
- Huffington Post Chicago (local edition of Huffington Post)
- Hypertext Magazine
- Injustice Watch
- Patch.com Chicago Network
- South Side Weekly
- Third Coast Review

== Media corporations ==
- Sun-Times Media Group
- Tribune Media

== See also ==
- City News Bureau of Chicago
- I Am Chicago
- Newspapers of the Chicago metropolitan area
