= Canon EF portrait lenses =

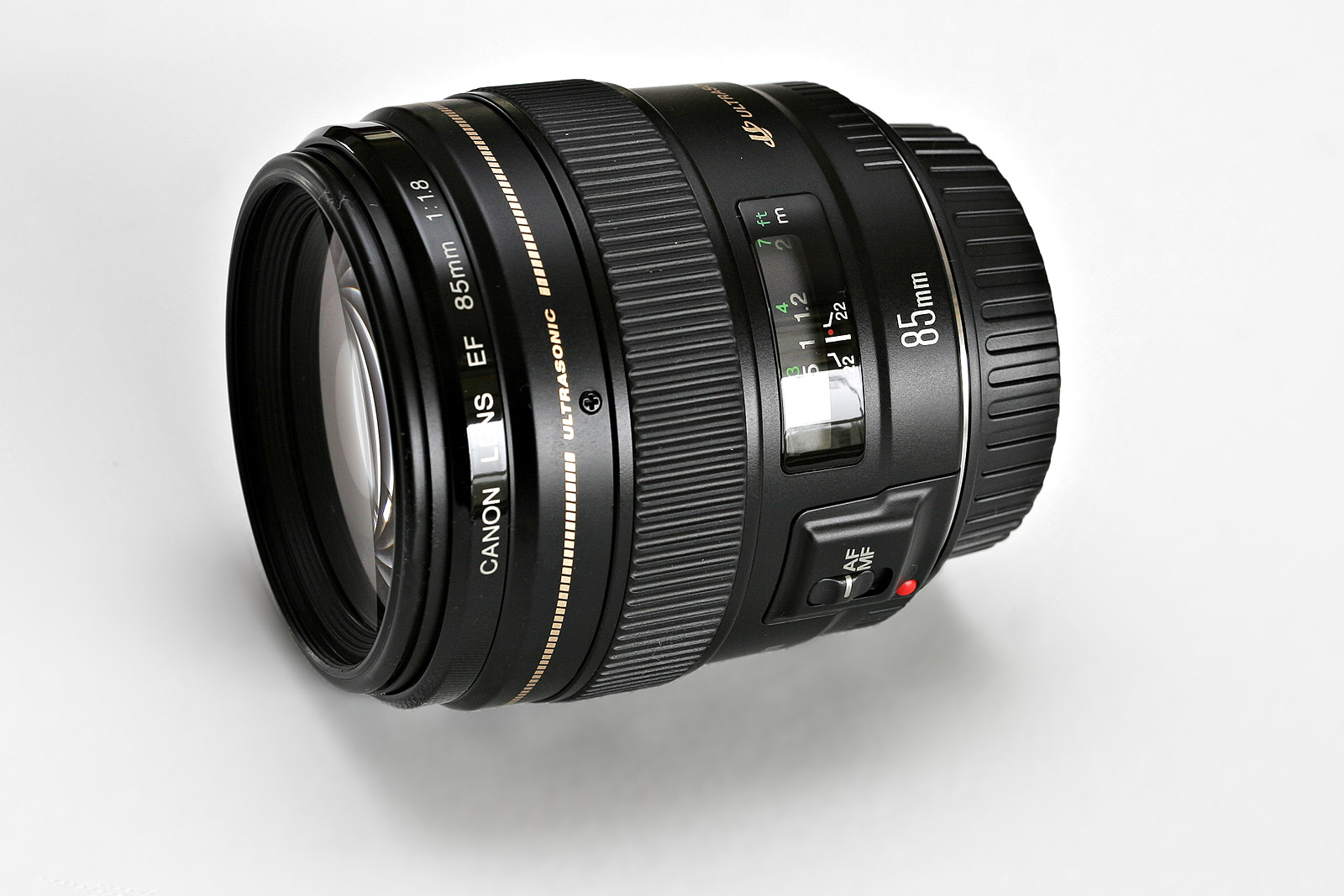
Canon EF 85mm f/1.8 USM, a classic portrait lens

Canon makes several lenses for the EF lens mount and EF-S lens mount that are well-suited for portrait photography. These lenses may also be used for other purposes, often being suited for indoor sports photography as well, due to suitable focal length and wide aperture, though autofocus speed is an issue in sports photography that is less important in portraiture.

== Criteria ==
Lenses suited for traditional portrait photography are medium telephoto lenses, in the 85 mm–135 mm range, which provide the desired perspective distortion in head and shoulders shots (compressing facial features), and have fast aperture, of f/2.8 or faster, to allow shallow depth of field, focusing attention on the subject.

One can use other lenses, either with shorter focal length (particularly for full body shots), or longer focal length (particularly in fashion photography, to increase the flattening effect, or in very cropped facial shots). Other lenses can be used for artistic effect; one could use a fisheye lens, for instance, though this is considered neither traditional nor flattering.

== Lenses ==
Lenses that fit these criteria on a full-frame camera are:

- EF 85mm f/1.2L II
- EF 85mm f/1.4L
- EF 85mm f/1.8
- EF 100mm f/2
- EF 100mm f/2.8 Macro
- EF 135mm f/2L
- EF 135mm f/2.8 with Softfocus

The EF 135mm f/2.8 with Softfocus is of particular note, as it includes soft focus, which is often a desirable effect in glamour photography.

=== APS-C ===
When used with DSLRs with cropped sensors, notably the APS-C-sized sensor with 1.6 crop factor (such as the popular Canon EOS 600D, also known as the "Digital Rebel T3i" or "EOS Kiss Digital X5"), one instead uses 50mm–85mm lenses, as these provide a 35 mm equivalent focal length of 80mm–136mm.

Lenses that fit these criteria are:

- EF 50mm lenses (f/1.0, f/1.2, f/1.4, f/1.8 II, f/1.8 STM, f/2.5 Compact Macro)
- EF-S 60mm f/2.8 Macro
- EF 85mm f/1.2L II
- EF 85mm f/1.4L
- EF 85mm f/1.8
