= WDDZ =

WDDZ may refer to:

- WPGP (AM), a radio station (1250 AM) licensed to Pittsburgh, Pennsylvania, United States, which used the call sign WDDZ from 2011 to 2015
- WSJW (AM), a radio station (550 AM) licensed to Pawtucket, Rhode Island, United States, which used the call sign WDDZ from 2001 to 2010
- WPJX, a radio station (1500 AM) licensed to Zion, Illinois, United States, which used the call sign WDDZ from 1998 to 2001
