= WRDZ =

WRDZ can refer to:

- WRDZ (AM), a radio station (1300 AM) licensed to La Grange, Illinois, United States.
- WZRL, a radio station (98.3 FM) licensed to Plainfield, Indiana, United States, which used the call sign WRDZ-FM from 2003 to 2015.
- WCCR (AM), a radio station (1260 AM) licensed to Cleveland, Ohio, United States, which used the call sign WRDZ from 1988 to 1995.
