= Super Express USA =

American Polish-language tabloid

Super Express USA Polish American Daily
- Type: Daily newspaper
- Format: Compact/Broadsheet
- Owner(s): Media Express USA
- Staff writers: 2
- Founded: April 15, 1996
- Language: Polish
- Headquarters: 111 John Street, Floor 28 Penthouse; New York, NY 10038; United States
- Circulation: 25,000
- Price: $0.75 / $1.50
- ISSN: 0867-8723
- Website: www.se.pl

Super Express USA is the largest Polish-American newspaper in the United States.

The newspaper has been published daily except Sundays and Holidays since April 15, 1996 and is distributed in New York, New Jersey, Connecticut, Massachusetts, Pennsylvania and Chicago.

The New York headquarter office is located in Manhattan on John Street, near the World Trade Center. The publishers are Super Express USA and Media Express USA. Its president is Beata Pierzchała.

Among many others famous writers for Super Express USA include:

- former prime minister - Kazimierz Marcinkiewicz
- former prime minister - Leszek Miller
- former president of the Polish Football Association - Michal Listkiewicz
- broadcast journalist, U.S correspondent, American producer & writer - Max Kolonko
- politician, author of the most popular blog in Poland - Janusz Korwin-Mikke
- the most famous Polish detective - Krzysztof Rutkowski

== See also ==
- List of newspapers in New York
- List of New York City newspapers and magazines
- Media in Chicago
