= Polvision =

Polish-language TV station in Chicago

Polvision is a Polish-language television station broadcasting in Chicago. Established in 1987, it is targeted towards the Chicago Polonia. From its inception Polvision was and still remains the only Polish language television program available free to the public, currently on the open digital channels 62.10, 34.1, 34.3 and Comcast 397, for the Polish Americans in the Chicago area.

== History ==
In March 2008, Polvision, as one of the first ethnic television stations, abandoned analogue terrestrial broadcasting for digital broadcasting. Since then, TV Polvision has been broadcasting its program on its digital channels only. The terrestrial range of the station includes part of the city of Chicago and the closest suburbs, and was later expanded to sister station WJYS (channel 62)'s 10th digital subchannel.

== Management ==
The founder and owner of Polvision is the Polish businessman Walter Kotaba, who is also the owner of Polnet Communications Ltd, which includes the largest Polish Radio network in the US, with stations in IL and NY/NJ as well as other ethnic radio programs (Russian, Korean, Italian, Greek, etc.) Its first editor-in-chief was Maciej Wierzyński, later editor-in-chief of New York's Nowy Dziennik.
