= WRDZ (AM) =

Simulcasts WPJX Zion
- La Grange, Illinois; United States
- Broadcast area: Chicago metropolitan area
- Frequency: 1300 kHz
- Branding: Rebel Radio

Programming
- Format: Heavy metal

Ownership
- Owner: Scott Davidson; (Rebel Chicago Media, Inc.)

History
- First air date: October 11, 1950
- Former call signs: WTAQ (1950–1998)
- Call sign meaning: Radio Disney (former owner and affiliation)

Technical information
- Licensing authority: FCC
- Facility ID: 28309
- Class: B
- Power: 4,500 watts (day); 4,000 watts (night)
- Transmitter coordinates: 41°40′29.1″N 87°45′45.2″W
- Translator: 105.5 W288EM (Justice)

Links
- Public license information: Public file; LMS
- Website: rebelradio.com

WRDZ (1300 kHz) is an AM radio station licensed to La Grange, Illinois, and serving the Chicago metropolitan area. The station, which began broadcasting in 1950, is owned and operated by Scott Davidson's Rebel Chicago Media.

By day, WRDZ is powered at 4,500 watts, at night, it reduces power to 4,000 watts. A directional antenna is used full-time.

== History ==
=== Early years ===
The station's original call sign was WTAQ, with the meaning "Western Towns Along the Q". The "Q" referred to the Chicago, Burlington and Quincy Railroad, which ran through the center of the station's coverage area. WTAQ first went on the air on October 11, 1950. The station was originally owned by La Grange Broadcasting Co. The station initially ran 500 watts and operated during daytime hours only.

WTAQ was a brokered time station and was branded "Chicago's Personality Station". The heart of this format was weekend ethnic polka programs, serving the large Eastern European population around Chicago. "Lil Wally" Jagiello, Uncle Henry Cukierka, Chet Schafer, Chet Gulinski, Eddie Blazonczyk, Johnny Hyzny, Eddie Korosa, Eddie Arenz, Art Schlaman, Jim Marwood, John Psczola, and many other polka shows made their home there.

In June 1984, William Wardle and Ralph Faucher purchased the station for $1,640,000.

=== Radio Fiesta and La Mexicana ===
In 1985, Lotus Communications Corporation purchased the station for $3,000,000, and it became a full-time Spanish language station. The station adopted a Spanish language adult contemporary format as "Radio Fiesta", and the station began broadcasting in C-QUAM AM stereo.

On July 17, 1989, the station's branding was changed to "La Mexicana", and the station broadcast a música norteña format. The station's "La Mexicana" format was simulcast with several other stations Lotus Communications owned. During the station's period as a Spanish language station, it carried the Spanish-language broadcasts of the Chicago White Sox.

=== Radio Disney ===
In July 1998, ABC Radio bought WTAQ 1300 and sister station WTAU 1500 in Zion, Illinois, and their Radio Disney network began to air on the stations on July 16 of that year, the station still remaining the AM stereo system.

WTAQ and WTAU's call signs were later changed to WRDZ and WDDZ (this allowed the original call holders in Green Bay, Wisconsin to resume using the WTAQ calls).

In January 2000, WDDZ went off the air and remained silent until early 2001. In the spring of 2002, the station returned to the air, once again simulcasting WRDZ with Radio Disney. The simulcast ended after the station was sold to Multicultural Broadcasting of Chicago in the summer of 2002.

In July 2007, the station stopped broadcasting in AM stereo and switched to the HD Radio.

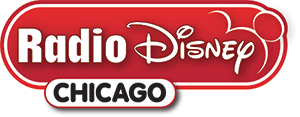
Final Radio Disney logo for WRDZ.

On August 13, 2014, Disney put WRDZ and twenty-two other Radio Disney stations up for sale, with the exception of KDIS (now KWVE) in Los Angeles, to focus on digital distribution of the Radio Disney network. Disney originally planned to temporarily shut down the station on September 26. However, the station remained on the air and continued carrying Radio Disney until it was sold.

=== Polish programming ===
On July 30, 2015, Radio Disney Chicago filed an application to sell WRDZ to Polnet Communications. The agreed purchase price for the station is $3,450,000. Polnet is the owner of WEEF, WKTA, WNVR and WPJX (former Radio Disney O&O and former satellite of WRDZ). The station went silent on October 30.

Previous logo

The sale was completed on December 2. The station returned to the air with a Polish language format branded "Polskie Radio", simulcasting WNVR 1030 AM. The station was taken silent on November 1, 2023, after the property where its transmitter site was located was sold.

Polnet Communications announced its selling silent 1300 WRDZ La Grange/Chicago to Scott Davidson's Rebel Chicago Radio for $30,000. Davidson will be responsible for all costs to build out new facilities for the station. He has operated the Heavy Metal "Rebel Radio" brand on multiple Chicago signals and is currently heard in Chicago's northern suburbs on Polnet's 1500 WPJX/92.5 W223CN Zion, Illinois.

== See also ==
- List of radio stations in Illinois
