= WJYS =

Television station in Hammond, Indiana

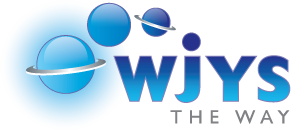
- Hammond, Indiana; Chicago, Illinois; United States
- City: Hammond, Indiana
- Channels: Digital: 21 (UHF); Virtual: 62
- Branding: WJYS, The Way

Programming
- Affiliations: 62.1: Independent; for others, see § Subchannels

Ownership
- Owner: Millennial Telecommunications, Inc.
- Sister stations: WEDE-CD

History
- First air date: March 2, 1991
- Former channel numbers: Analog: 62 (UHF, 1991–2009); Digital: 36 (UHF, until 2019)
- Call sign meaning: Original owners Joseph and Yvonne Stroud

Technical information
- Licensing authority: FCC
- Facility ID: 32334
- ERP: 140 kW
- HAAT: 510 m (1,673 ft)
- Transmitter coordinates: 41°52′44″N 87°38′8″W

Links
- Public license information: Public file; LMS
- Website: wjystv.net

WJYS (channel 62) is an independent television station licensed to Hammond, Indiana, United States, serving the Chicago area. Owned by Millennial Telecommunications, Inc., WJYS maintains studio facilities on South Oak Park Avenue in Tinley Park, Illinois, and its transmitter is located atop the Willis Tower.

After a lengthy award and construction process, WJYS began broadcasting on March 2, 1991. It was originally a home shopping station before becoming a general-entertainment independent in November 1994. It augmented its syndicated programming with local-interest specialty shows for Chicago's Black community as well as local sports, but it slowly became primarily a purveyor of religious programs and infomercials.

From October 1, 2024, to June 8, 2025, WJYS served as the over-the-air flagship station of the Chicago Sports Network, carrying both its main channel and overflow feed.

== History ==
Channel 62 was first proposed to be constructed in Hammond, Indiana, in the 1960s. Aben E. Johnson Jr. of Bloomfield Hills, Michigan, proposed to build channel 56 but saw his application shifted to channel 62. Johnson hoped to build the Action Network with the Hammond station, which was given the call sign WAXN-TV, and WXON-TV near Detroit. Johnson struggled to find a suitable site that would meet his obligations to broadcast to Hammond while serving the Chicago metropolitan area, and he focused on building the Detroit-area station first. The station never was constructed, as Chicago-area stations protested transmitter site proposals and Johnson ran out of financing; Johnson surrendered the construction permit to the Federal Communications Commission (FCC) in November 1970.

Channel 62 remained assigned to Hammond and was sought by Northwest Indiana Public Broadcasting, a group composed of advisory members of St. John–based public station WCAE. The group had splintered from WCAE's owner, the Lake Central School Corporation, over programming and community operation issues.

By 1981, a new crop of potential owners had applied for channel 62 as a full-service station. Whiteco Industries of Merrillville proposed a station providing commercial programming, particularly of interest in Indiana, to underserved Northwest Indiana. Whiteco's Northwest Indiana Television formally applied for the channel that July, by which time it was already the third applicant. The FCC designated in April 1982 for comparative hearing applications from eight parties: Apogee, Inc.; Hammond, Indiana T.V.; Jovon Minority Broadcasting Corporation; Northwest Indiana Television; Hammond Telecasters; Pan American Broadcasting Company; Cafricam Television; and Cross Country Network. FCC administrative law judge Joseph P. Gonzalez handed down an initial decision in June 1984, favoring Pan American Broadcasting Corporation. It planned to begin broadcasting as the first full-time Spanish-language TV station in the Chicago market. The initial decision was overturned seven months later by the FCC's review board. The board found that Jovon Minority Broadcasting Corporation—owned by Joseph and Yvonne Stroud—had a superior proposal for integration of ownership and management, a comparative criterion. It relied on a technicality in the Pan American bid; one of the owners was going to be an office manager, which was not deemed an actual management position.

The Strouds chose the call sign WJYS for their names and selected a transmitter site in Tinley Park, Illinois. Though Tinley Park approved the necessary zoning in May 1988, a change in tower height required Federal Aviation Administration reauthorization, and the Strouds were forced to ask for several extensions of time to build.

After nearly a decade, WJYS finally began broadcasting on March 2, 1991. Where the Strouds had planned a general-entertainment independent station, they were motivated by high program costs to begin WJYS as a round-the-clock shopping channel utilizing Home Shopping Spree. It had no facilities in the state of Indiana in spite of being licensed to Hammond. The station slowly added local-interest programs, primarily directed at the Black community. Examples in the 1990s included a weekly talk show with blues artists, The Blues News; Positive Images, a music video and entertainment show for the Black community; and a weekly show hosted by Doug Banks, then at WGCI-FM radio.

WJYS switched to a general-entertainment independent format and dropped home shopping in November 1994. It was one of the chief beneficiaries of the conversion to Univision programming by WGBO-TV (channel 66), picking up much of its syndicated programming inventory as well as Hoosier Millionaire, the game show produced by Indiana's Hoosier Lottery. Channel 62 rounded out its schedule of mostly classic TV series with a late-night anime block, local sports, and infomercials. Its wide assortment of programming caused a columnist from The Herald-News in Joliet, Illinois, to compare it to the former Tempo cable channel. By 2009, WJYS primarily broadcast religious programs and infomercials.

WJYS began digital broadcasting on channel 36 on August 1, 2002. Where its analog transmitter was located in Tinley Park, its digital broadcasts originate from atop Willis Tower. The station became digital-only in 2009, continuing on channel 36 using virtual channel 62, and was repacked to channel 21 in 2019 as a result of the 2016 United States wireless spectrum auction.

On September 15, 2024, the newly formed Chicago Sports Network announced it would broadcast on the second and third digital subchannels of WJYS starting October 1, bringing games featuring the Chicago White Sox, Bulls, and Blackhawks to over-the-air viewers. Outside of its main channel, WJYS carried its channels in MPEG-4 in order to properly route video on its multiplexer depending on CHSN's demands and programming. This meant that televisions which can only receive MPEG-2 video (the older ATSC video standard) were required to use a MPEG-4 compatible decoder box to receive WJYS over-the-air, including CHSN. After the new year after multiple complaints from viewers unable to reliably receive the station, WJYS began to transmit the CHSN channels in the older MPEG-2 standard, though this required a downgrade of both channels to 720p transmission, with all other channels remaining in MPEG-4. Following Comcast's carriage agreement with CHSN, the network's OTA operations stopped at midnight on June 9, 2025, and it was replaced on WJYS with Stadium, which was carried until November 2025.

== Subchannels ==
The station's signal is multiplexed:

Subchannels of WJYS
Subchannel	Res.	Short name	Programming
40.1	720p	ESTV	Estrella TV (WESV-LD)
40.3	480i	Hot97	Hot 97 TV
62.1	1080i	WJYSDT	Main WJYS programming
62.2	720p	CRTV	CRTV (infomercials)
62.4	480i	HRTLND	Heartland
62.5	480i	QVC	QVC
62.6	480i	TBD	Heartland
62.7	480i	JTV	Jewelry TV
62.8	480i	HSN	HSN
62.9	480i	HSN2	HSN2
62.10	480i	MCTV	Polvision (Polish independent)

Simulcast of subchannels of another station
Subchannel broadcast with MPEG-4 video
