= Canon EF 135mm lens =

Camera lens

== EF 135mm f/2L USM ==
The Canon EF 135mm f/2L USM is a short-to-medium telephoto lens. The "135/2" is mainly used for portrait photography and for indoor sports, where the lighting is often poor. The fast f/2 aperture makes the lens ideal for both of these applications.

Among Canon photographers, the lens is highly regarded for its sharpness, contrast, and color rendition. The lens is also popular because it is very sharp at its maximum aperture of f/2, allowing the photographer to throw the background out of focus while recording a lot of detail on the primary subject. This gives the photographer fine-grained control over depth of field.

The EF 135mm f/2L USM lens offers internal focus; the length does not change while focusing. The lens is compatible with the Canon Extender EF teleconverters.

== EF 135mm f/2.8 with Softfocus ==
The Canon EF 135mm f/2.8 with Softfocus is a soft focus prime lens introduced by Canon Inc. in 1987 designed for portrait photography.

This is the only EF lens that has soft focus capabilities, allowing the user to control the lens's correction of spherical aberration. This feature is controlled by rotating the soft focus selector which has three choices; 0, 1, and 2. On the 0 setting, it functions as a standard 135mm prime lens. Settings 1 and 2 adjust the amount of softness in the focus. This is done by rotating elements that are inside of the lens to create deliberate spherical aberration.

Due to its old design, the 135mm SF does not feature USM technology; rather, it uses arc-form drive technology. Despite this, focusing is quite fast and reasonably quiet. Since focusing is achieved with the rear element, the front element does not rotate or extend. The lens supports all 52mm filters.

The lens can be used with any camera that accepts EF lenses, but cannot be used with Canon's teleconverters.

== Specifications ==
| Attribute | f/2L USM | f/2.8 w/Softfocus |
|---|---|---|
| Image | | |
Key features
| Full-frame compatible | Yes Yes | |
| Image stabilizer | No No | |
| Ultrasonic Motor | Yes Yes | No No |
| L-series | Yes Yes | No No |
| Diffractive Optics | No No | |
| Macro | No No | |
Technical data
| Aperture (max-min) | f/2–f/32 | f/2.8–f/32 |
| Construction | 8 groups / 10 elements | 6 groups / 7 elements |
| # of diaphragm blades | 8 | 6 |
| Closest focusing distance | 0.9 m (3.0 ft) | 1.3 m (4.3 ft) |
| Max. magnification | 0.19× (1:5.3) | 0.12× (1:8.3) |
| Horizontal viewing angle | 15° | |
| Diagonal viewing angle | 18° | |
| Vertical viewing angle | 10° | |
Physical data
| Weight | 750 g (1.65 lb) | 390 g (0.86 lb) |
| Maximum diameter | 82.5 mm (3.25 in) | 69.2 mm (2.72 in) |
| Length | 112 mm (4.4 in) | 98.4 mm (3.87 in) |
| Filter diameter | 72 mm | 52 mm |
Accessories
| Lens hood | ET-78II | ET-65III |
| Case | LP1219 | LP1016 |
Retail information
| Release date | April 1996 | October 1987 |
| MSRP $ | $1089 | $450 |
| Street price $ | $900 | $279 |

== See also ==
- Bokeh
- Canon L lens
- Canon EF lens mount
- Canon EF Portrait Lenses
- Canon EF 85mm lens – 136mm equivalent on 1.6× cropped sensor
