= Canon EF 100mm lens =

Camera lens for Canon

The Canon EF 100 mm lenses are used for Canon DSLR cameras. There are four different types of EF 100 mm lens for Canon. Certain lenses are best for macro photos, whereas other lenses are good for taking pictures of subjects from a distance.

== EF 100mm f/2.8 Macro lens ==
The Canon EF 100mm f/2.8 Macro was a prime lens designed for Canon's EF lens mount. It was first marketed in April 1990 with an original price of 72,200 yen.

== EF 100 mm f/2.8 Macro USM lens ==
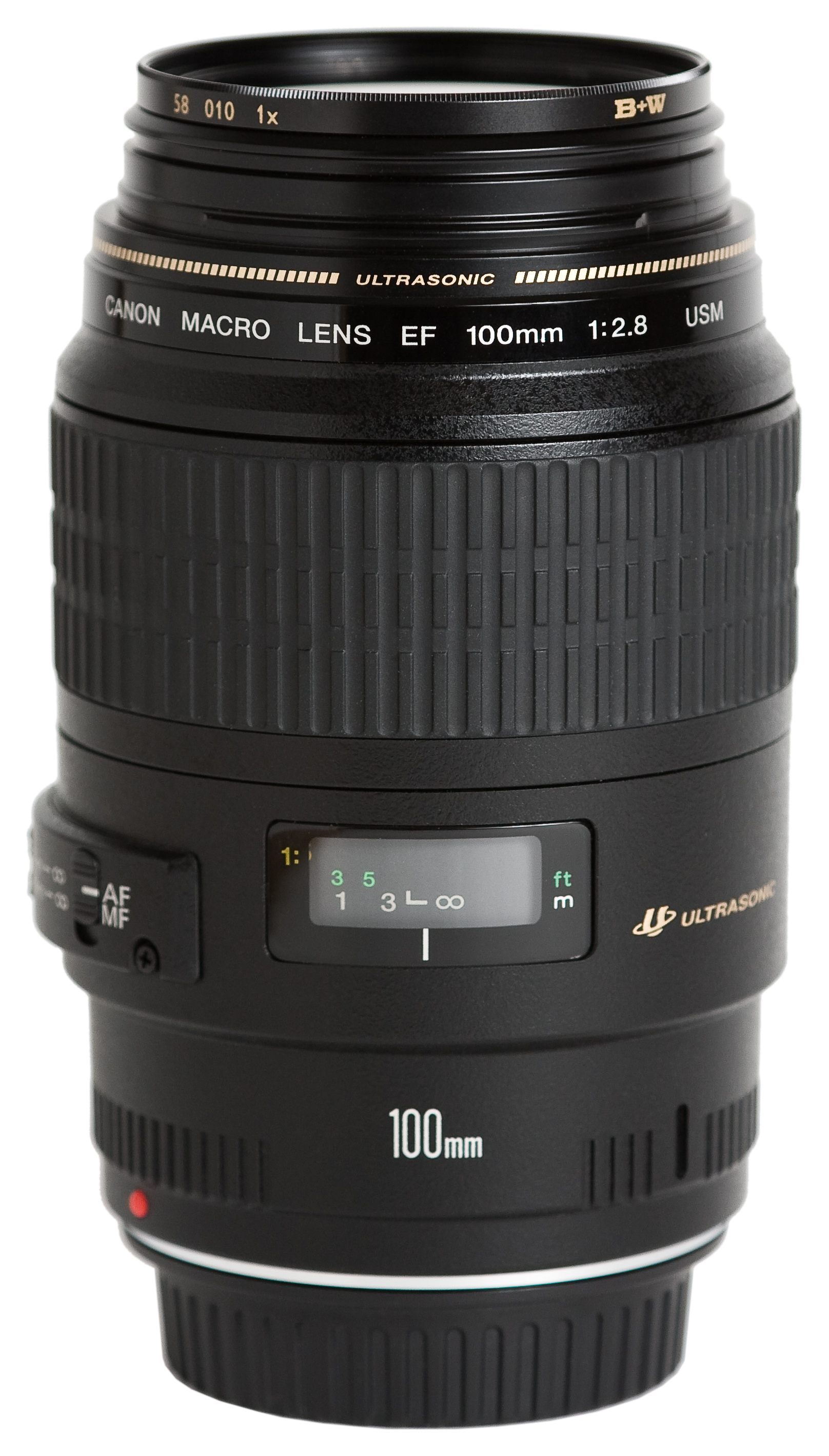
The Canon EF 100 mm f/2.8 Macro USM lens

The EF 100 mm f/2.8 Macro USM lens is a prime lens made by Canon Inc. It is of the EF lens mount that fits the EOS camera system. There are three versions, the original, a second that adds a USM autofocus motor, and a recently released L series version that incorporates Image Stabilization (IS).

It is a macro lens, meaning that it is capable of reproducing an object the size of the image sensor, known as 1:1 magnification. Despite the macro designation, the lens can focus to infinity like regular lenses. As such, it is appropriate for use as a portrait lens.

This lens can be used with an extension tube, which increases the maximum magnification to 1.19× (EF 12 II) or 1.39× (EF 25 II). In these cases, focusing at infinity is sacrificed, with maximum distance reduced to 1002 mm (3.3 ft) and 606 mm (2.0 ft) respectively.

== EF 100 mm f/2.8L Macro IS USM lens ==
The EF 100 mm f/2.8L Macro IS USM lens is the second macro lens in the Canon L series. It incorporates IS, improved build quality, weather sealing, and a new lens configuration resulting in improved MTF plots. This is the first lens on the market to incorporate Canon's new Hybrid Image Stabilization Technology. Hybrid IS effectively compensates for both angular and shift camera shake during close-up shooting.

This lens requires the Macro Lite Adapter 67 to be used with the MR-14EX and MT-24EX macro flashes.

== EF 100 mm f/2.0 USM lens ==
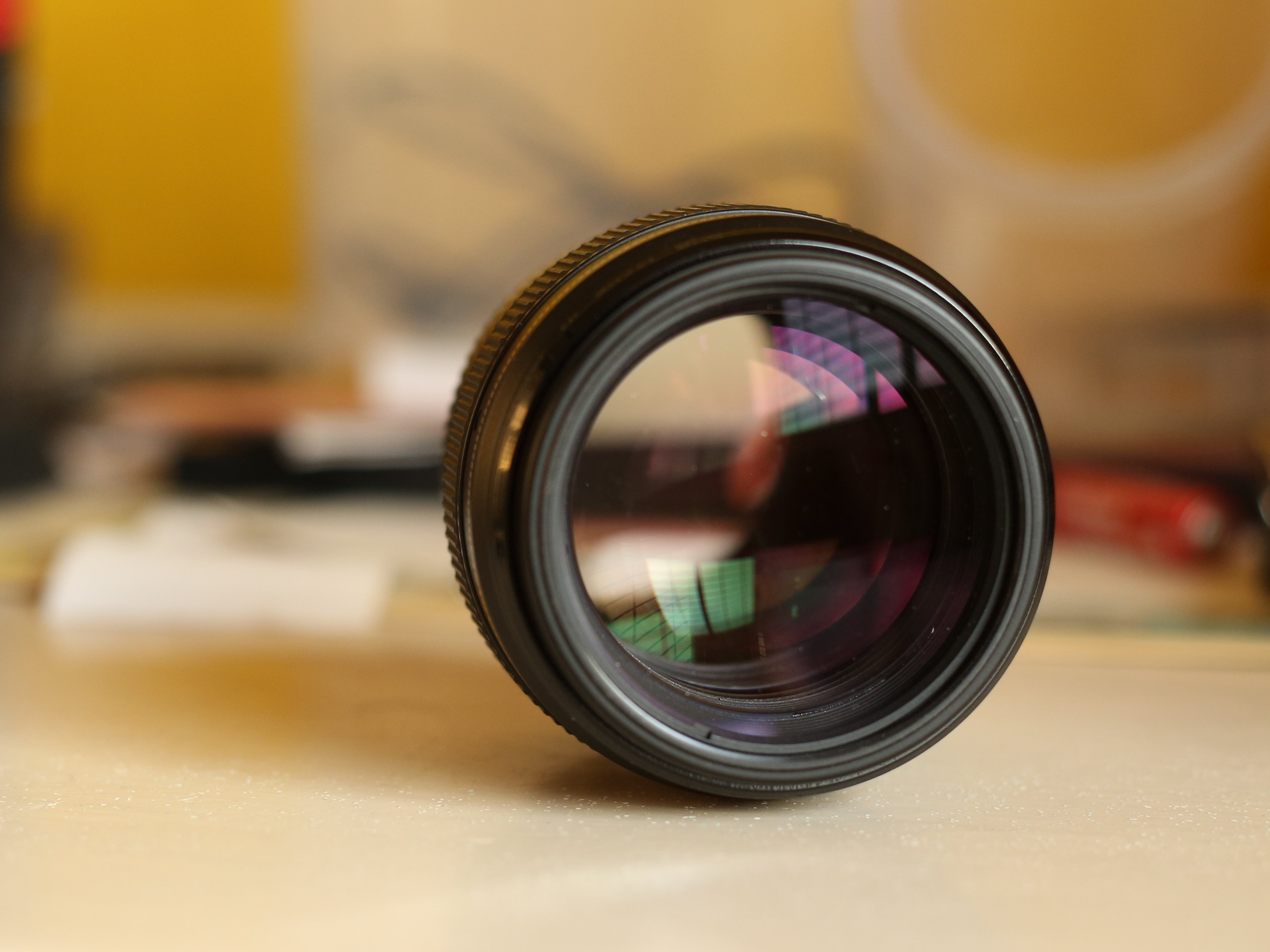
100 mm f/2.0 USM, open

The EF 100 mm f/2.0 USM lens is a compact medium telephoto lens with a large aperture. Its physical and optical characteristics are similar to the Canon EF 85 mm f/1.8 lens.

Since this lens is not a macro lens, it is lighter and smaller than the macro lenses. It is also a stop faster. Therefore, it can act as an excellent general-purpose lens. It can be used for candids, street photography, and other situations where a somewhat narrower field of view compared to the standard 50 mm lens is useful. Its fast maximum aperture lends itself to low-light photography like standard lenses, with excellent performance wide open.

The addition of EF Extension Tubes allows close-up and partial macro-like photography using this lens.

== Specifications ==
Attribute	f/2.8 Macro	f/2.8 Macro USM	f/2.8L Macro IS USM	f/2.0 USM
Image				
Key features
Full-frame compatible	Yes			
Image stabilizer	No		Yes	No
Ultrasonic Motor	No	Yes		
L-series	No		Yes	No
Diffractive Optics	No			
Macro	Yes			No
Technical data
Aperture (max-min)	f/2.8-f/32			f/2.0-f/22
Construction	9 groups / 10 elements	8 groups / 12 elements	12 groups / 15 elements	6 groups / 8 elements
# of diaphragm blades	8		9	8
Closest focusing distance	12" / 310 mm		11.88" / 302 mm	35.43" / 900 mm
Max. magnification	1:1			0.14×
Diagonal viewing angle	24°		23.4°	24°
Physical data
Weight	1.43 lbs / 650 g	1.32 lbs / 600 g	1.38 lbs / 625 g	1.01 lbs / 460 g
Maximum diameter	2.95" / 75 mm	3.1" / 79 mm		2.95" / 75 mm
Length	4.15" / 105.5 mm	4.7" / 119 mm	4.8" / 122 mm	2.89" / 73.5 mm
Filter diameter	52 mm	58 mm	67 mm	58 mm
Accessories
Lens hood		ET-67	ET-73	ET-65 III
Case	LP816	LP1219		
Retail information
Release date	1990	2000	2009	1991
Currently in production?	No No	No Yes		No No
MSRP $	72,200 yen	$599.99	$1049.00	$479.99
