= Red Streak =

American tabloid newspaper

- Type: Daily newspaper
- Format: Tabloid
- Owner: Sun-Times Media Group
- Founded: 2002
- Ceased publication: 2005
- Headquarters: 350 N. Orleans St. Chicago, IL 60654; United States
- Website: (defunct) chicagoredstreak.com

The Red Streak was a tabloid format newspaper published in Chicago from October 2002 to December 2005. It was published by the Chicago Sun-Times, as a competitor to RedEye, which was published by the Chicago Tribune.}

Initially, both competing newspapers were distributed free of charge by "hawkers" on street corners. After about six months of giving the newspapers away, both companies placed vending boxes throughout the city with the papers available for 25 cents. At the end of 2005, Red Streak was discontinued as, according to Sun-Times publisher John Cruickshank, Red Streak was only launched to prevent RedEye' from drawing paying commuters away from the Sun-Times, a newspaper historically dominant among commuters. At the beginning of 2006, RedEye vending boxes were unlocked and converted to free distribution again, without the original hawkers.
