= North Lawndale Community News =

- Type: Weekly newspapers, community journalism
- Format: Broadsheet
- Owner: Strategic Human Services
- Publisher: Isaac Lewis, Jr.
- Founded: 1999
- Headquarters: 5650 W Madison St. Chicago, IL 60644
- Circulation: 15,000
- ISSN: 1548-6087
- Website: www.nlcn.org/cms

North Lawndale Community News is a United States weekly community newspaper based in Chicago's North Lawndale neighborhood. It is published by Strategic Human Services, a local non-profit agency. The paper is financed through grants, as well as subscriptions and advertising revenue.

== History ==
North Lawndale Community News was started in 1999 by a group of North Lawndale residents to communicate important information throughout their community. It began as a monthly newspaper, but it was eventually able to achieve weekly circulation.

During the reconstruction of the Douglas branch of the Pink Line rapid transit line, the newspaper raised concerns that CTA did not hire any neighborhood residents for the project. The resulting controversy ultimately prompted CTA to change its policy.

== Regular features ==
North Lawndale Community News publishes a mix of community news and articles that advise residents of services and opportunities in the area. Unusually for community newspapers, it features a regular film review column (At the Flicks, written by David Schulz).

The newspaper draws on contributors from the North Lawndale community. Editors, writers and photographers are recruited from the neighborhood, and local teenagers distribute the papers to subscribers.
