= Russian language in the United States =

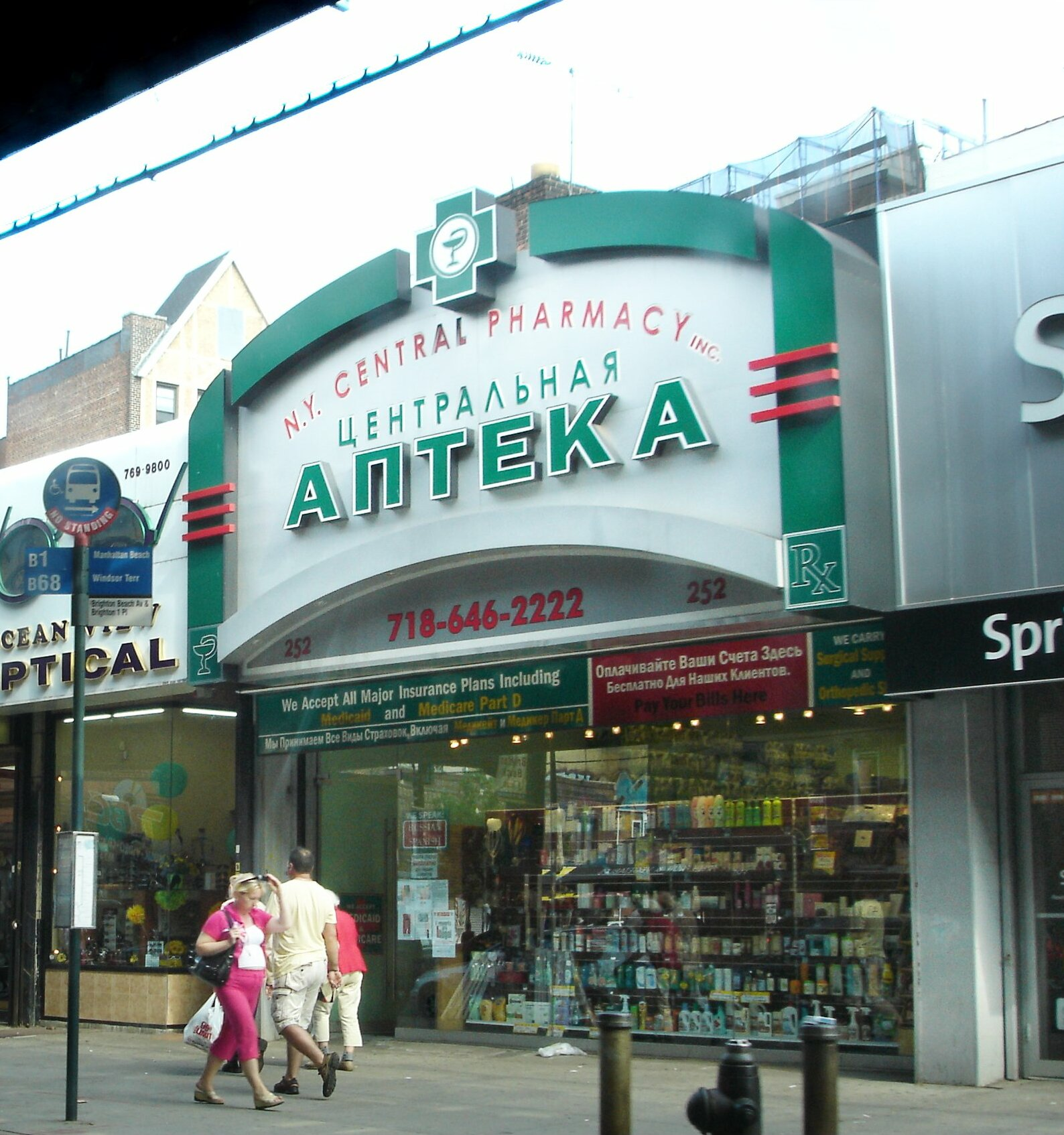
A pharmacy in Brighton Beach, Brooklyn, New York with its name translated into Russian

The Russian language is among the top fifteen most spoken languages in the United States, and is one of the most spoken Slavic and European languages in the country. Since the dissolution of the Soviet Union, many Russians have migrated to the United States and brought the language with them. Most Russian speakers in the United States today are Russian Jews. According to the 2010 United States census the number of Russian speakers was 854,955, which made Russian the 12th most spoken language in the country.

== History ==
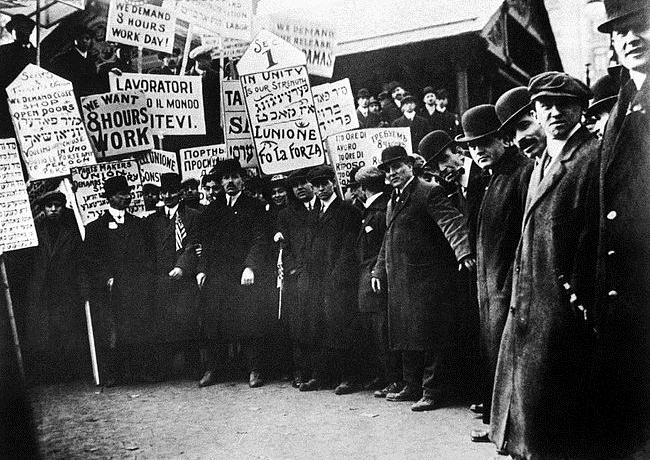
Garment workers on strike in New York City holding multilingual signs, including in Russian, circa 1913

Russian speakers in the United States
Year	Number of speakers
1910^{a}	57,926
1920^{a}	▲392,049
1930^{a}	▼315,721
1940^{a}	▲356,940
1960^{a}	▼276,834
1970^{a}	▼149,277
1980	▲173,226
1990	▲241,798
2000	▲706,242
2010	▲854,955
^a Foreign-born population only

The first Russians to land on the New World were explorers who reached Alaska in 1648. More than 200 years later, in 1867, Czar Alexander II sold Alaska to the United States. Many Russian settlers returned to Russia, but a small number of them remained. In 1882 16,918 Russian speakers lived in the US, and that number gradually increased to 387,416 by 1899.

In the late nineteenth and early twentieth centuries many Russian Jews migrated to the United States, fleeing persecution at home. Though many spoke Yiddish, most knew Russian. Millions also left Russia after the 1917 Bolshevik Revolution. The 1920 US census identified 392,049 United States citizens born in Russia; the statistics from a decade before that showed only 57,926 Russian-born Americans. Most of the newcomers were White émigrés. Russian immigration slowed in the 1930s and 1940s due to restrictions imposed by the Stalin government in the Soviet Union. The U.S. Immigration and Naturalization Service listed 14,016 Russian immigrants entering the country from 1930 to 1944. Most of those people were citizens of the USSR who refused to return to their country from trips abroad, so-called nevozvrashchentsy (non-returners).

The next big wave of immigration started in the 1970s. If they were allowed to leave, Soviet Jews had little difficulty entering the U.S., and many did so. Russian-speaking Jews constitute about 80% of all immigrants from the former Soviet states.

Since 2012, New York State institutions provide free interpretations from/into Russian. Also, some state and elections documents are translated into it.

== Demographics ==
=== Education ===
Russian speakers are more likely to have a higher education degree than the national average. 92% of them have a high school diploma and 51% a bachelor's degree. 75% of Russian-speakers speak English "well" or "very well" according to the 2007 data of the U.S. Census Bureau. Most Molokans learn Russian.

=== Distribution ===
Historical population
Census	Pop.	Note	%±
1910	57,926		—
1920	392,049		576.8%
1930	315,721		−19.5%
1940	356,940		13.1%
1960	276,834		—
1970	149,277		−46.1%
1980	173,226		16.0%
1990	241,798		39.6%
2000	706,242		192.1%
2010	854,955		21.1%

Like most Russian Americans, Russian-speakers are mainly concentrated in major urban areas. The New York metropolitan area contains by far the largest number of Russian-speakers. Brooklyn became home to the largest Russian-speaking community in the United States; most notably, Brighton Beach has a large number of recent Russian immigrants and is also called "Little Odessa". The New York state's Russian-speaking population was 218,765 in 2000, which comprised about 30% of all Russian-speakers in the nation. California came second, with 118,382 speakers, followed by New Jersey (38,566), Illinois (38,053), Massachusetts (32,580), Pennsylvania (32,189), and Washington (31,339), Florida (19,729), Maryland (17,584), and Oregon (16,344).

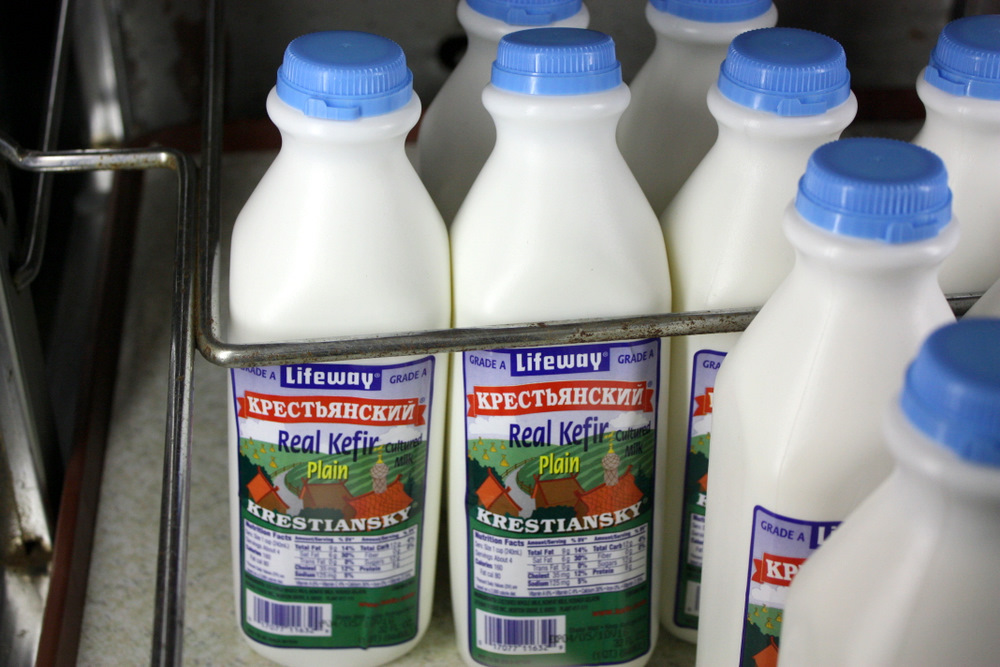
Lifeway, a company based in Chicago and started by a Ukrainian immigrant, is a big producer of Russian dairy products

In California, as of 2000, the highest density of Russian speakers (21% of total population) was observed in the ZIP code 90046, corresponding to the city of West Hollywood and the Hollywood Hills neighborhood of Los Angeles. Statewide, the city of San Francisco accounted for about 14% of all Russian speakers, the ZIP codes of Hollywood and West Hollywood accounted for 12%, and northeast Sacramento accounted for 8%. Alaska holds the title for having the oldest Russian-speaking community (some Alaskans even still speak the old Russian colonial dialect, though it is in steep decline) and even its own unique dialect, dating back to the 1700s, although in much smaller numbers than other areas in the United States. In Nikolaevsk, Russian is spoken more than English.

=== Viability ===
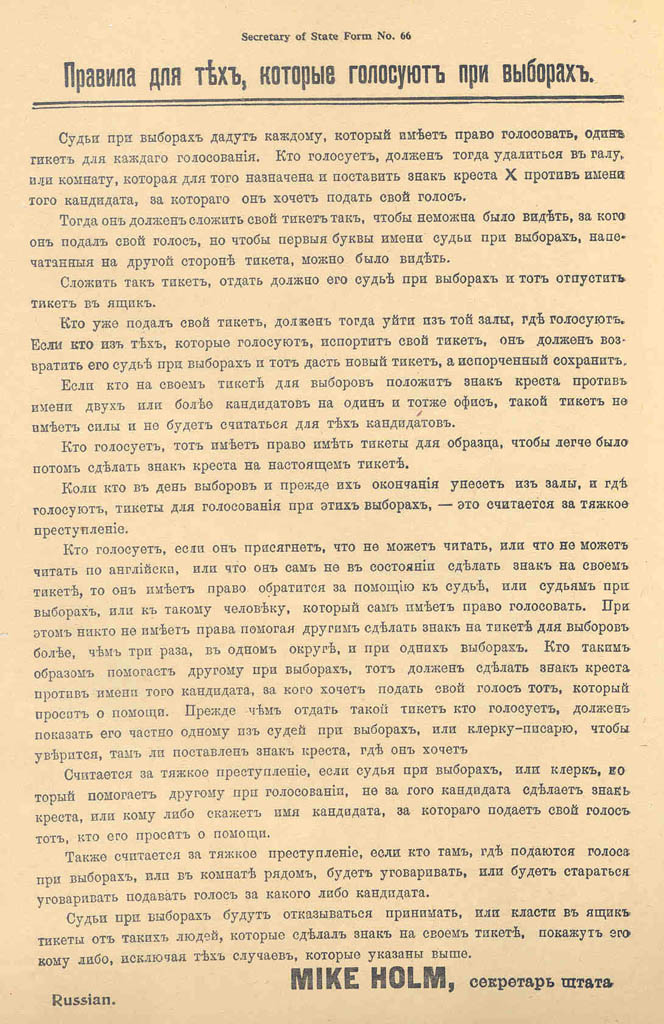
Voting instructions to recent immigrants from the Secretary of State for Minnesota Mike Holm, issued between 1920 and 1930. Pre-1918 spelling reform spelling is used (rejection of 'Bolshevist' spelling reform was a prominent feature of White émigrés).

In terms of viability, the state of the language in the United States is much better compared to some other European languages, although a considerable minority of the children born to Russian-speaking parents are raised as monolingual English speakers. According to the 2010 census data, 14.7% of the Russian speakers in the United States are aged between 5 and 17. This is significantly lower than the English speakers (18.8% aged 5–17), but much higher when compared to speakers of Polish (11.3%) and Hungarian (6.8%). The Russian-speaking population is younger in states with large Old Believer or former-USSR Evangelical concentrations, such as Alaska and Oregon.

Table: Percentage of people aged 5 to 17 years among the Russian speaking population in the US, according to the 2010 census
Note: Total excludes children under 5 years of age, living in Russian speaking households

State	Total	Aged 5–17	Aged 5–17 (%)
New York	216,468	24,531	11.30%
California	141,718	19,503	13.80%
Washington	49,282	13,975	28.40%
New Jersey	46,094	6,636	14.40%
Illinois	41,244	4,871	11.80%
Massachusetts	37,865	5,180	13.70%
Pennsylvania	35,029	5,275	15.10%
Florida	31,566	4,002	12.70%
Oregon	21,443	5,622	26.20%
Maryland	19,892	2,175	10.90%
Texas	17,310	2,108	12.20%
Ohio	15,672	1,847	11.80%
Minnesota	14,427	3,104	21.50%
Virginia	13,922	1,846	13.30%
Georgia	13,091	2,332	17.80%
Colorado	13,090	2,228	17.00%
Michigan	12,363	1,553	12.60%
Connecticut	11,457	1,496	13.10%
North Carolina	9,288	1,699	18.30%
Missouri	7,831	1,566	20.00%
Arizona	7,685	895	11.60%
Wisconsin	6,817	770	11.30%
Indiana	5,722	962	16.80%
Tennessee	4,270	933	21.90%
Alaska	4,218	730	17.30%
Utah	3,912	976	24.90%
Nevada	3,808	436	11.40%
South Carolina	3,806	991	26.00%
Maine	2,408	849	35.30%
Kentucky	2,208	236	10.70%
Idaho	1,966	283	14.40%
Kansas	1,919	288	15.00%
Oklahoma	1,774	270	15.20%
Rhode Island	1,740	90	5.20%
Iowa	1,683	238	14.10%
Louisiana	1,576	267	16.90%
New Hampshire	1,447	263	18.20%
Alabama	1,437	177	12.30%
District of Columbia	947	48	5.10%
Montana	893	332	37.20%
New Mexico	887	109	12.30%
Hawai'i	814	136	16.70%
Nebraska	807	60	7.40%
South Dakota	762	153	20.10%
Mississippi	725	81	11.20%
Vermont	637	80	12.60%
Delaware	550	77	14.00%
Wyoming	519	130	25.00%
North Dakota	429	88	20.50%
Arkansas	415	34	8.20%
West Virginia	338	47	13.90%
Total	836,171	122,578	14.70%

== Media ==
=== Newspapers ===
The first Russian-language newspaper in the United States, Svoboda (Freedom), was published in 1867–1871; it was known as the Alaska Herald in English. Dozens of short-lived Russian newspapers were published until 1940. Russkaya Reklama (Russian Advertisement) weekly, founded in 1993 in Brooklyn, New York, is the largest Russian-language newspaper in the US, with a circulation of over 100,000. It consists of yellow pages with classified ads.

Novoe russkoe slovo (The New Russian Word), published since 1910, was the longest published Russian daily newspaper until 2009, when it went weekly. In the 1920s, it stopped being communist and pursued the wider audience of the Russian diaspora. Its 1918-2001 archive is available for digital access at the National Library of Finland.

Two years later, in 2011, the only Russian-language daily, the Reporter (Репортер), began to be published in New York.

Vecherniy New York (The Evening New York) serves Tri-State area Russian-speakers, and Panorama, published since 1980, serves the Russian-speakers of the Greater Los Angeles area.

Kstati Russian American Newspaper (To the Point) serves the Bay Area.V Novom Svete (In the New World) covers mostly international news and is circulated nationwide, while Evreiskii Mir (The Jewish World) is targeted at Russian-speaking Jews.

=== Television ===
Some Russian television stations in the United States include NTV, Russkii Mir (Russian World), RTR Planeta, RT News, RTVI, Channel One, Channel 9 (Israel). However, as of the beginning of the military actions by Russia, all Russian broadcasting on cable and satellite had been dropped temporarily. After a week of no broadcasting any Russian Television due to mounting public pressure from the Russian Speaking community TV providers restored access to both RTVI and RTN which were based in NYC. Some access to Russian State Media channels is still possible through the Internet/streaming.

=== Radio ===
There are local Russian language stations such as DaNu Radio, Davidzon Radio, Radio Russkaya Reklama in New York, New Life Radio in Chicago, Slavic Family Radio, RussianTown Radio and many more are available online.

=== Web ===
The Slavic Sacramento and Slavic Family are the only two online sources that publishes daily news in Russian in California, Oregon and Washington. The main majority visitors of this web site reside in Sacramento and its surroundings, Bay Area, Washington, Oregon, Texas, Florida and New York.

== See also ==
- Alaskan Russian
- Russian Americans
