= WEEF =

- Deerfield, Illinois; United States
- Frequency: 1430 kHz

Programming
- Format: Multicultural ethnic

Ownership
- Owner: Polnet Communications, Ltd.
- Sister stations: WKTA; WNVR; WPJX

History
- First air date: August 15, 1963
- Former call signs: WEEF (1963–1973); WVVX (1973–1977); WQVQ (1977–1979)
- Call sign meaning: Eli E. Fink

Technical information
- Licensing authority: FCC
- Facility ID: 72957
- Class: B
- Power: 1,600 watts day; 750 watts night
- Transmitter coordinates: 42°8′22.1″N 87°53′7.2″W
- Translator: 99.1 W256DC (Deerfield)

Links
- Public license information: Public file; LMS

WEEF (1430 AM) is a radio station licensed to Deerfield, Illinois. The station broadcasts a multicultural ethnic format and is owned by Polnet Communications, Ltd.

== History ==
=== MOR era ===
WEEF began broadcasting on August 15, 1963. The station was originally licensed to Highland Park, Illinois, and ran 1,000 watts during daytime hours only. WEEF's call sign stood for "Eli E. Fink", the station's original owner. It originally aired a middle of the road (MOR) format. Until the mid–1970s, the station was simulcast on 103.1 WEEF-FM (later WVVX-FM). In December 1967, the station was sold to Unique Radio, along with 103.1 WEEF-FM, for $350,000.

=== Progressive rock era ===
In July 1972, the station's adopted a progressive rock format. In spring 1973, the station was sold to Vanguard Communications, along with 103.1 WEEF-FM, for $290,000, and its callsign was changed to WVVX.

=== Ethnic programming ===
By 1977, the station had adopted a multicultural ethnic format. On October 25, 1977, the station's callsign was changed to WQVQ. In 1978, the station was sold to Metroweb Corporation for $260,000. Its call sign was changed back to WEEF on February 12, 1979. In 1984, the station was sold to Gordon and Myra Winston for $500,000. In 1996, the station was sold to Leveton Communications for $835,000. In 2003, the station was sold to Polnet Communications for $1.1 million, in a transaction brokered by Media Services Group Managing Director Bob Heymann, who as a 16-year-old Highland Park High School student began working at WEEF in 1969.

== Translator ==
WEEF is also heard on an FM translator on 99.1 MHz.

Broadcast translator for WEEF
Call sign	Frequency	City of license	FID	ERP (W)	HAAT	Class	Transmitter coordinates	FCC info
W256DC	99.1 FM	Deerfield, Illinois	155076	50	45 m (148 ft)	D	42°8′20.2″N 87°53′7.4″W	LMS
