= WKTA =

U.S. AM radio station

- Evanston, Illinois; United States
- Broadcast area: Chicago metropolitan area
- Frequency: 1330 kHz
- Branding: Novoe Radio Chicago (weekdays 7 am–7 pm); La Mega 95.9 FM & 1330 AM (weekdays 7 pm–7 am and weekends full time)

Programming
- Languages: Russian (weekdays 7 a.m.–7 p.m.); Spanish (weekdays 7 p.m.–7 a.m. and weekends full time)
- Format: Russian (weekdays 7 a.m.–7 p.m.); Latin pop and reggaeton (weekdays 7 p.m.–7 a.m. and weekends full time)

Ownership
- Owner: Polnet Communications, Ltd.
- Sister stations: WEEF; WNVR; WPJX

History
- First air date: 1953
- Former call signs: WEAW (1953–1979); WPRZ (1979–1981); WEAW (1981–1987); WSSY (1987–1990)

Technical information
- Licensing authority: FCC
- Facility ID: 52909
- Class: D
- Power: 5,000 watts (day); 110 watts (night)
- Transmitter coordinates: 42°8′22.1″N 87°53′7.2″W
- Translator: 95.9 W240DE (Evanston)

Links
- Public license information: Public file; LMS
- Webcast: Listen live
- Website: novoeradiochicago.com; lamega959chicago.blogspot.com

WKTA (1330 AM) is a commercial radio station broadcasting a Russian format weekdays 7 a.m.–7 p.m. and a Latin pop and reggaeton format weekdays 7 p.m.–7 a.m. and weekends full time. Licensed to Evanston, Illinois, the station serves the Chicago metropolitan area and is owned by Polnet Communications, Ltd.

By day, WKTA transmits with 5,000 watts, but to protect other stations on 1330 AM from interference, it drops its power to 110 watts at night. It uses a directional antenna with a six-tower array. Programming is also heard on 80-watt FM translator W240DE on 95.9 MHz.

== History ==
The station signed on the air in 1953 as WEAW. The station was owned by North Shore Broadcasting, and the station's call letters stood for the name of its president, Edward A. Wheeler. The station's transmitter was located in Evanston and it ran 500 watts during daytime hours only. In 1956, the station's power was increased to 1,000 watts. By 1959, the station had begun airing brokered ethnic programming. In 1962, the station's transmitter was moved to an unincorporated area between Northbrook and Wheeling, and its power was increased to 5,000 watts. By the early 1970s the station primarily aired brokered ethnic and religious programs.

By early 1979, the station had begun airing a Christian radio format. On June 1, 1979, the station's call sign was changed to WPRZ, which stood for the word "Praise". On July 14, 1979, WPRZ presented the Christian contemporary festival "Alleluia", which featured Chuck Girard. The station was taken off the air in autumn of 1980.

In late 1981, the license was sold to Lee Hague for $125,000. The following year the station was brought back on the air from a new site in the same area, with the WEAW call sign revived. The station aired adult contemporary music and religious programming. By the mid-1980s the station was airing Christian talk and teaching programs and uptempo Christian contemporary music, with a certain amount of secular adult contemporary mixed in. Christian talk and teaching programs heard on WEAW included The Old-Time Gospel Hour with Jerry Falwell, Family Altar with Lester Roloff, and Insight for Living with Chuck Swindoll.

In 1986, the station was sold to Polnet Communications for $1.2 million. The station would air adult contemporary music, along with a large amount of ethnic programming. In October 1987, the station's call sign was changed to WSSY. The station was branded "Sunny 1330".

In 1989, WSSY began to air a hard rock and heavy metal format branded "G-Force", though brokered ethnic and religious programming continued to air mornings and early afternoons. In 1990, the station's call letters were changed to WKTA. By early 1991, "G-Force" had ended, and the station aired brokered ethnic and religious programming. The hard rock and heavy metal format would again appear on WKTA as "Rebel Radio", a brokered format launched by G-Force alumni Scott Davidson. WKTA would become a flagship station for the hard rock network, which was syndicated to other stations in the midwest.

In 2003, New Life Russian Radio began broadcasting from Northbrook, Illinois, on 1330 AM WKTA. "New Life" was replaced by "United 4 Good", which was replaced by "Resonance Radio" featuring call-in shows, international news, and Russian popular music. "Resonance Radio" aired some English language sports talk (locally produced during morning drive, and syndicated SB Nation Radio during overnights).

WKTA airs some automated Spanish language Mexican when hour blocks are not purchased by outside programmers. The station had aired Russian language programming 'Reklama Radio' on weekdays. As of 2024, the Russian language programming is named "Novoe Radio Chicago", airing weekdays 7 a.m.–7 p.m.

== FM translator ==
In addition to the main signal on 1330 kHz, the WKTA signal is also heard on 95.9 MHz, an FM translator.

Broadcast translator for WKTA
Call sign	Frequency	City of license	FID	ERP (W)	HAAT	Class	FCC info
W240DE	95.9 FM	Evanston, Illinois	147928	80	44 m (144 ft)	D	LMS
