= Portrait photography =

Type of photography aimed at expressing the personality of the human subject(s)

Natural light portraiture

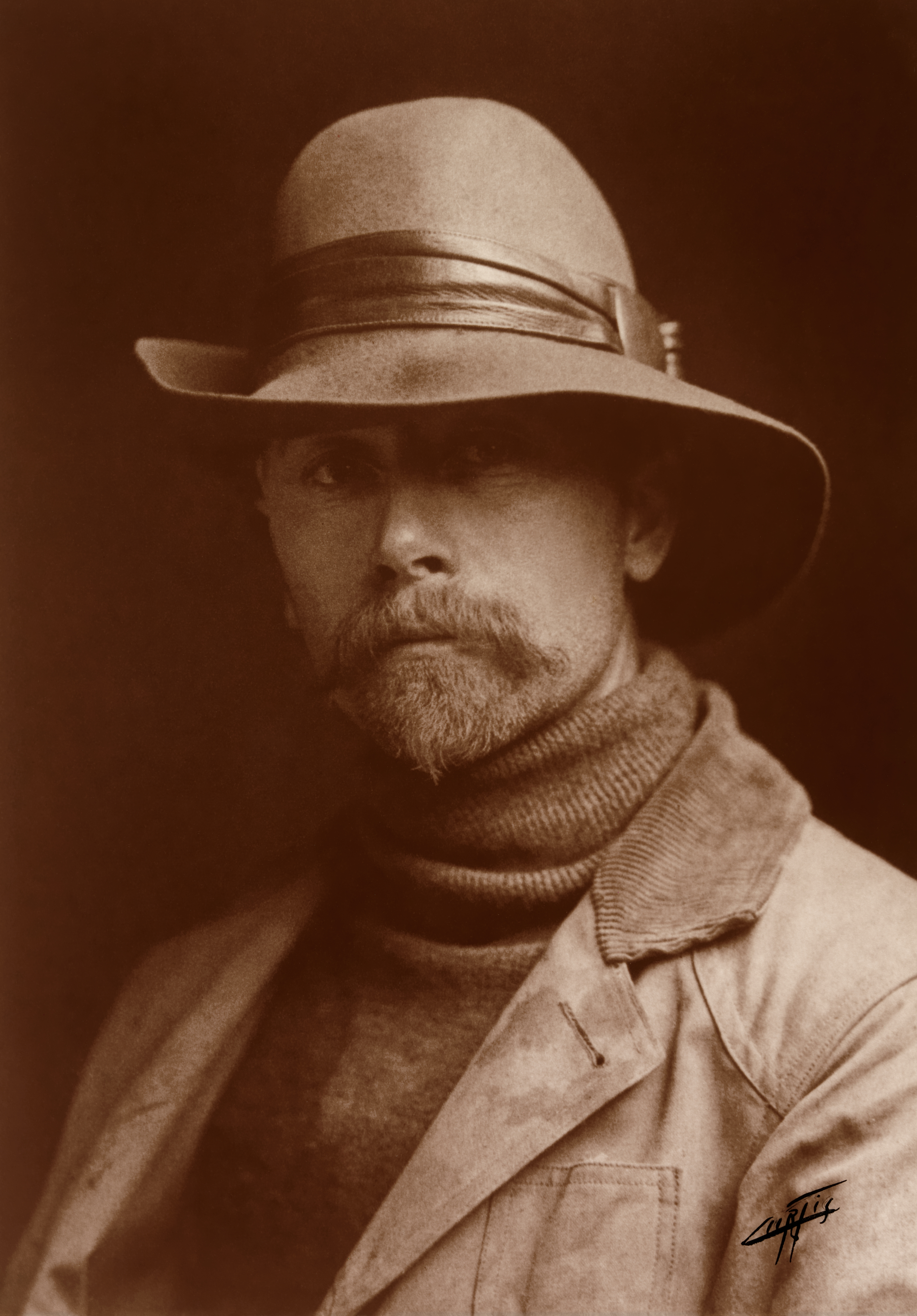
Edward S. Curtis, self-portrait

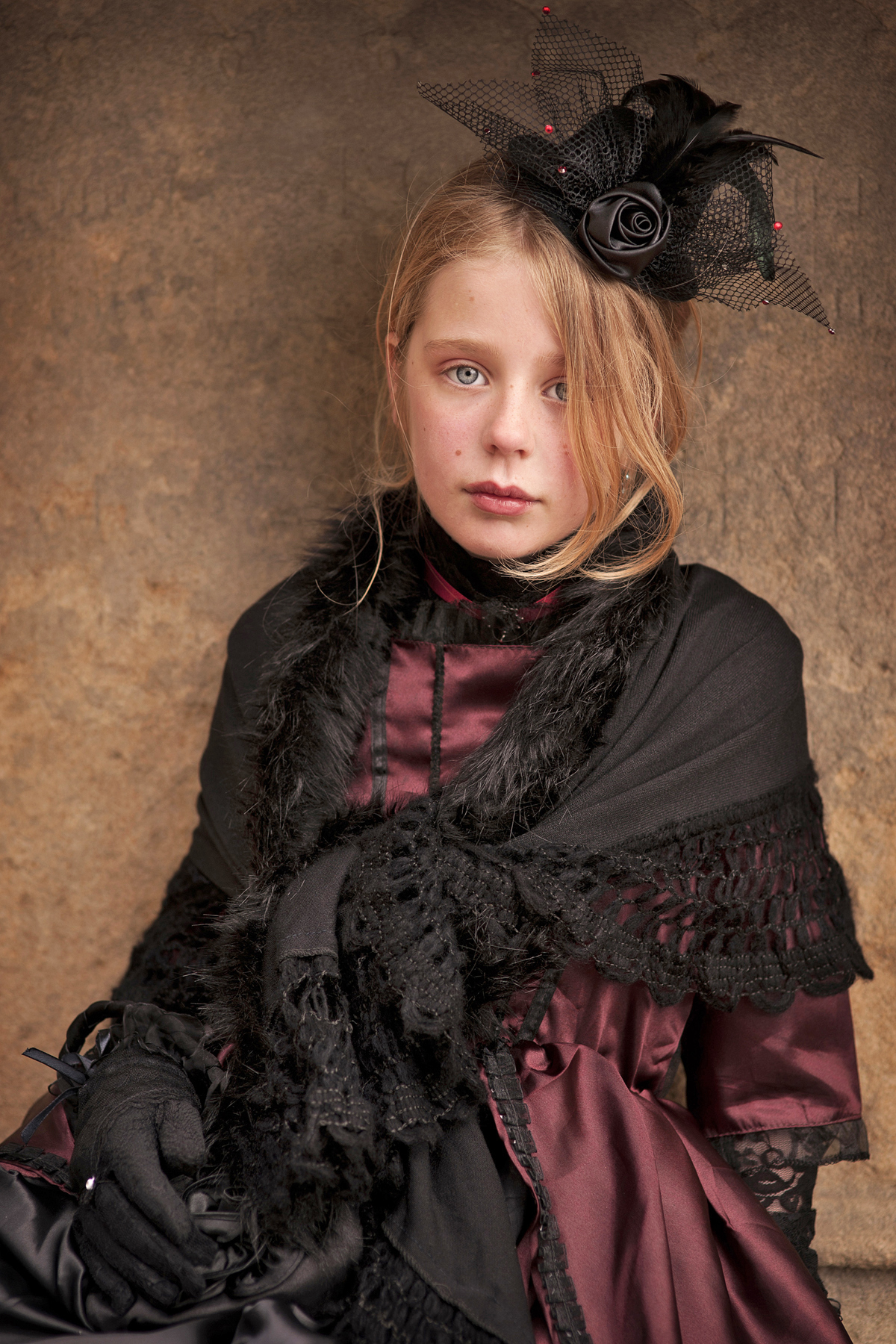
Portrait of a girl in costume in the natural environment of a gothic festival

Portrait photography, or portraiture, is a type of photography aimed toward capturing the personality of a person or group of people by using effective lighting, backdrops, and poses. A portrait photograph may be artistic or clinical. Frequently, portraits are commissioned for special occasions, such as weddings, school events, or commercial purposes. Portraits can serve many purposes, ranging from usage on a personal web site to display in the lobby of a business.

== History ==
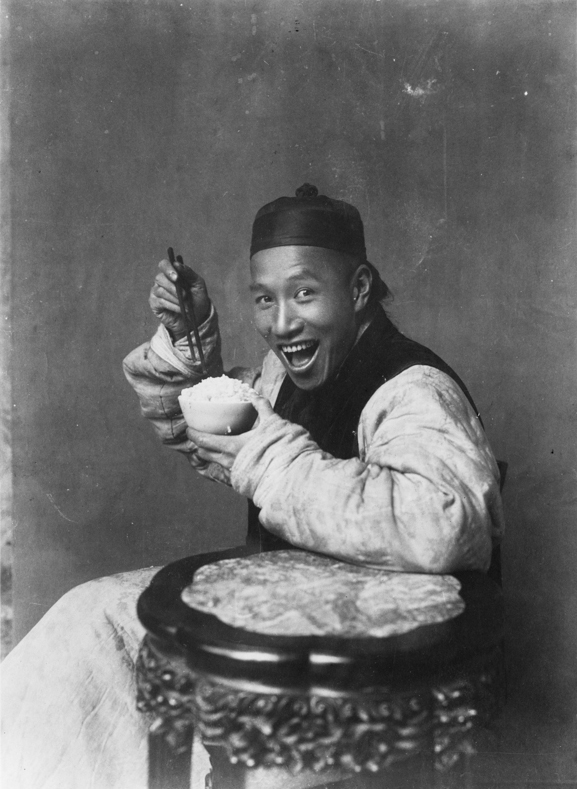
In the 19th century and early 20th century, photographs did not often depict smiling people in accordance to Victorian and Edwardian cultural conventions. In contrast, the photograph Eating Rice, China depicts a smiling Chinese man.

The relatively low cost of the daguerreotype in the middle of the 19th century and the reduced sitting time for the subject, though still much longer than now, led to a general rise in the popularity of portrait photography over painted portraiture. The style of these early works reflected the technical challenges associated with long exposure times and the painterly aesthetic of the time. Hidden mother photography, in which portrait photographs featured young children's mothers hidden in the frame to calm them and keep them still, arose from this difficulty. Subjects were generally seated against plain backgrounds, lit with the soft light of an overhead window, and whatever else could be reflected with mirrors.

Advances in photographic technology since the daguerreotype spawned more advanced techniques, allowed photographers to capture images with shorter exposure times, and work outside a studio environment.

== Lighting for portraiture ==
There are many techniques available to light a subject's face.

=== Three-point lighting ===
Typical three-point lighting schematic

Three-point lighting is one of the most common lighting setups. It is traditionally used in a studio, but photographers may use it on-location in combination with ambient light. This setup uses three lights, the key light, fill light, and back light, to fully bring out details and the three-dimensionality of the subject's features. When the back light shines directly on the subject from behind, it also may be known as the hair light; a fourth light may be used to illuminate the background if needed.

Illustration of Key Lighting

==== Key light ====
The key light, also known as the main light, is placed either to the left, right, or above the subject's face, typically 30° to 60° from the camera. The purpose of the key light is to give shape to and emphasise particular features of the subject. The distance of the key light from the camera controls the falloff of the light and profoundness of shadows.

==== Fill light ====
The fill light, also known as the secondary main light, is typically placed opposite the key light. For example, if the key light is placed 30° camera-left, the fill light will be placed 30° camera-right. The purpose of a fill light is to combat strong shadows created by the main light. Intensity of the fill light may be equal to the main light to eliminate shadows completely, or less intense to simply lessen shadows. Sometimes, the purpose of a fill light may be served by a reflector rather than an actual light.

==== Back light ====
The back light, also known as a hair light, helps separate a subject from its background and emphasise hair. In some cases, photographers may use a hair light to create lens flare or other artistic effects.

=== High-key and low-key lighting ===
==== High-key ====
High-key lighting is a technique used to result in an image that is mostly free of shadows and has a background brighter than the subject. High-key lighting typically involves use of all three lights (or more) in the three-point lighting setup.

==== Low-key ====
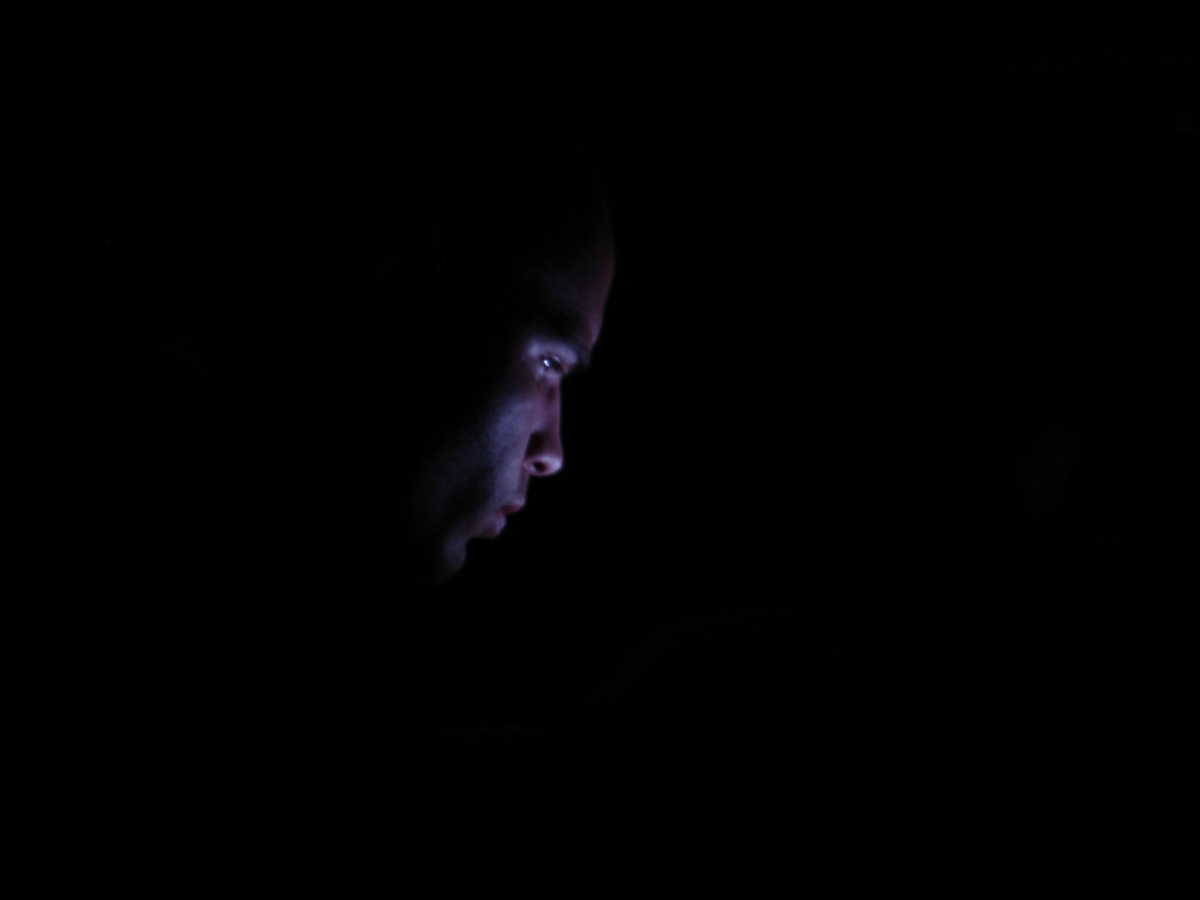
Low-key portrait

Low-key lighting is a technique used to result in an image where only part of the subject is lit, has dark shadows, and a background darker than the subject. Low-key lighting typically involves use of just one light in the three-point lighting setup (although sometimes two).

=== Butterfly lighting ===
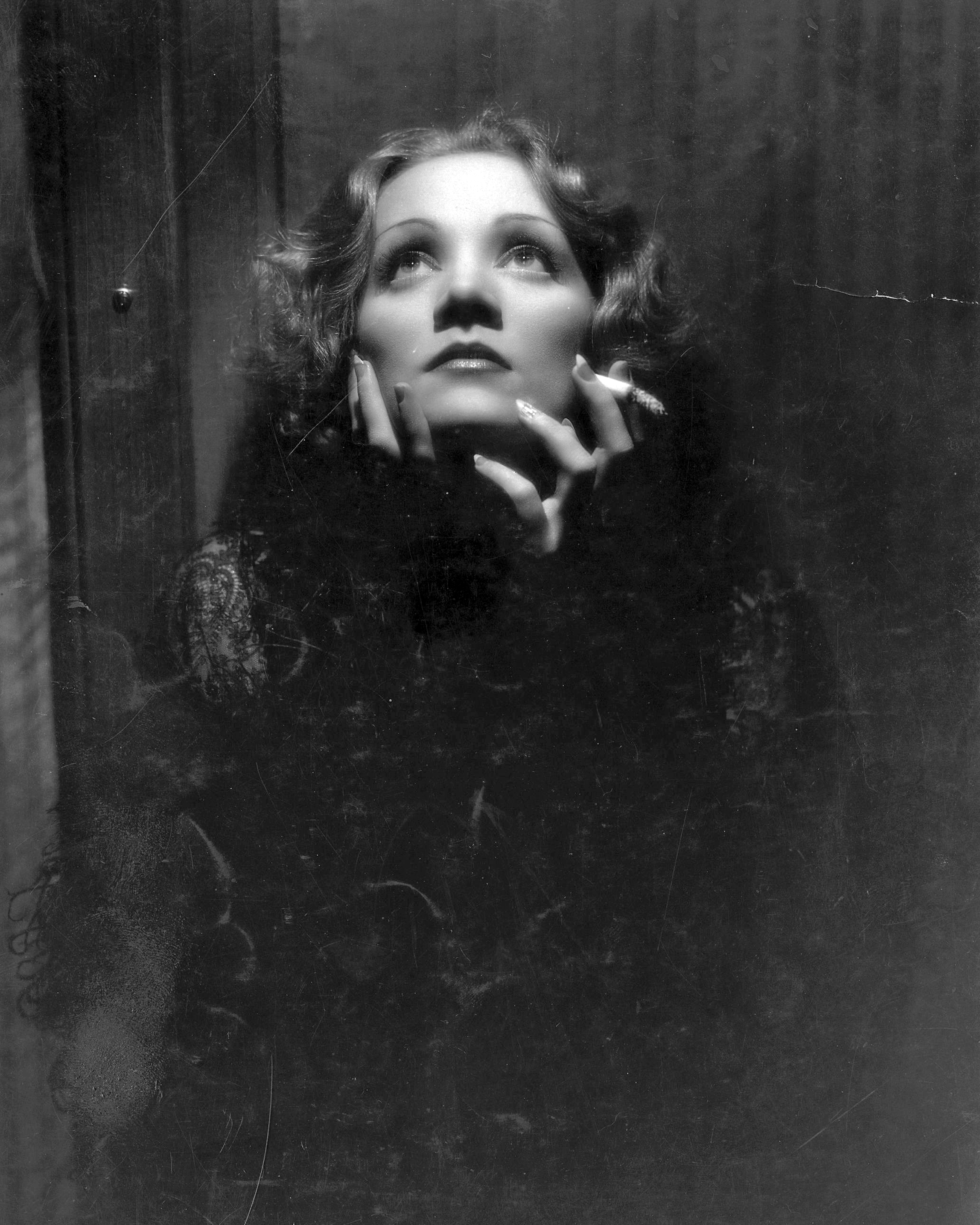
Director Josef von Sternberg used butterfly lighting to enhance Marlene Dietrich's features in this iconic shot, from Shanghai Express, Paramount 1932.

Butterfly lighting uses only two lights. The key light is placed directly in front of the subject above the camera (or slightly to one side), and a bit higher than the key light in a three-point lighting setup. The second light (more often a reflector rather than an actual light) is placed as a fill directly below the camera (or slightly to the opposite side).

This lighting may be recognised by the strong light falling on the forehead, the bridge of the nose, the upper cheeks, and by the distinct shadow below the nose that often looks rather like a butterfly and thus, provides the name for this lighting technique.

Butterfly lighting was a favourite of famed Hollywood portraitist George Hurrell, which is why this style of lighting is often called Paramount lighting.

=== Other lighting equipment ===
Most lights used in modern photography are a flash of some sort. The lighting for portraiture is typically diffused by bouncing it from the inside of an umbrella, or by using a soft box. A soft box is a fabric box, encasing a photo strobe head, one side of which is made of translucent fabric. This provides a softer lighting for portrait work and is often considered more appealing than the harsh light often cast by open strobes. Hair and background lights are usually not diffused. It is more important to control light spillage to other areas of the subject. Snoots, barn doors and flags or gobos help focus the lights exactly where the photographer wants them. Background lights are sometimes used with colour gels placed in front of the light to create coloured backgrounds.

Devices, tools, or accessories employed in photography, videography, and cinematography to shape, control, alter, direct, block, blackout, or otherwise affect light emitted from a light source, which may be natural or artificial light are called Light Modifiers. By altering the quality, direction, intensity, colour, and or other attributes and characteristics of light, light modifiers enabling photographers to achieve specific effects or moods in their images, as well as shoot at locations and times that would not be possible without ability to modify light. Light modifiers come in various categories and types, each with its own unique characteristics and applications. They can be freestanding, placed on stands, handheld, hung, fit over a camera lens, etc. Modifiers can be collapsible and portable and/or rigid and stationary.

=== Windowlight portraiture ===
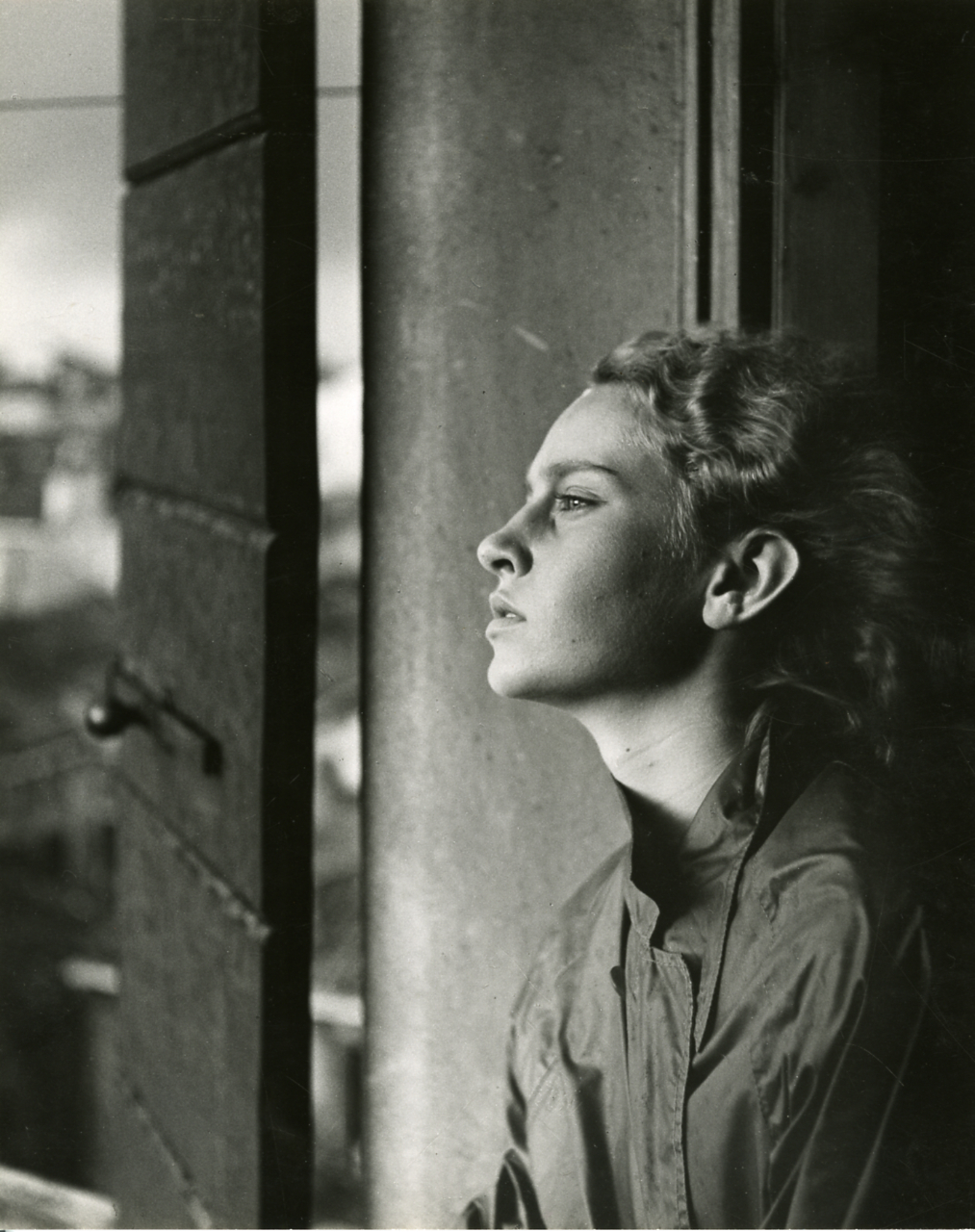
Profile portrait with window light by Italian photographer Paolo Monti, 1955

Windows as a source of light for portraits have been used for decades before artificial sources of light were discovered. According to Arthur Hammond, amateur and professional photographers need only two things to light a portrait: a window and a reflector. Although window light limits options in portrait photography compared to artificial lights it gives ample room for experimentation for amateur photographers. A white reflector placed to reflect light into the darker side of the subject's face, will even the contrast. Shutter speeds may be slower than normal, requiring the use of a tripod, but the lighting will be beautifully soft and rich.

The best time to take window light portrait is considered to be early hours of the day and late hours of afternoon when light is more intense on the window. Curtains, reflectors, and intensity reducing shields are used to give soft light, while mirrors and glasses can be used for high-key lighting. At other times, coloured glasses, filters and reflecting objects can be used to give the portrait desired colour effects. The composition of shadows and soft light gives window light portraits a distinct effect different from portraits made from artificial lights.

While using window light, the camera can be positioned to give the desired effects. For example, putting the camera behind the subject can produce a silhouette of the individual while having the camera adjacent to the subject give a combination of shadows and soft light, and facing the subject from the same point of light source will produce high-key effects with least shadows.

=== Existing lighting ===
Environmental portraits are often taken under existing conditions, without additional lighting equipment, but lighting modifiers such as gobos and reflectors may be used to block overhead light or provide fill, respectively.

== Styles of portraiture ==
There are many different techniques for portrait photography. Often it is desirable to capture the subject's eyes and face in sharp focus while allowing other less important elements to be rendered in a soft focus. At other times, portraits of individual features might be the focus of a composition such as the hands, eyes or part of the subject's torso.

Head shots have become a popular style within portrait photography, particularly in the entertainment industry, where they are commonly used to showcase a subject's facial features and expressions.

=== Approaches to portraiture ===
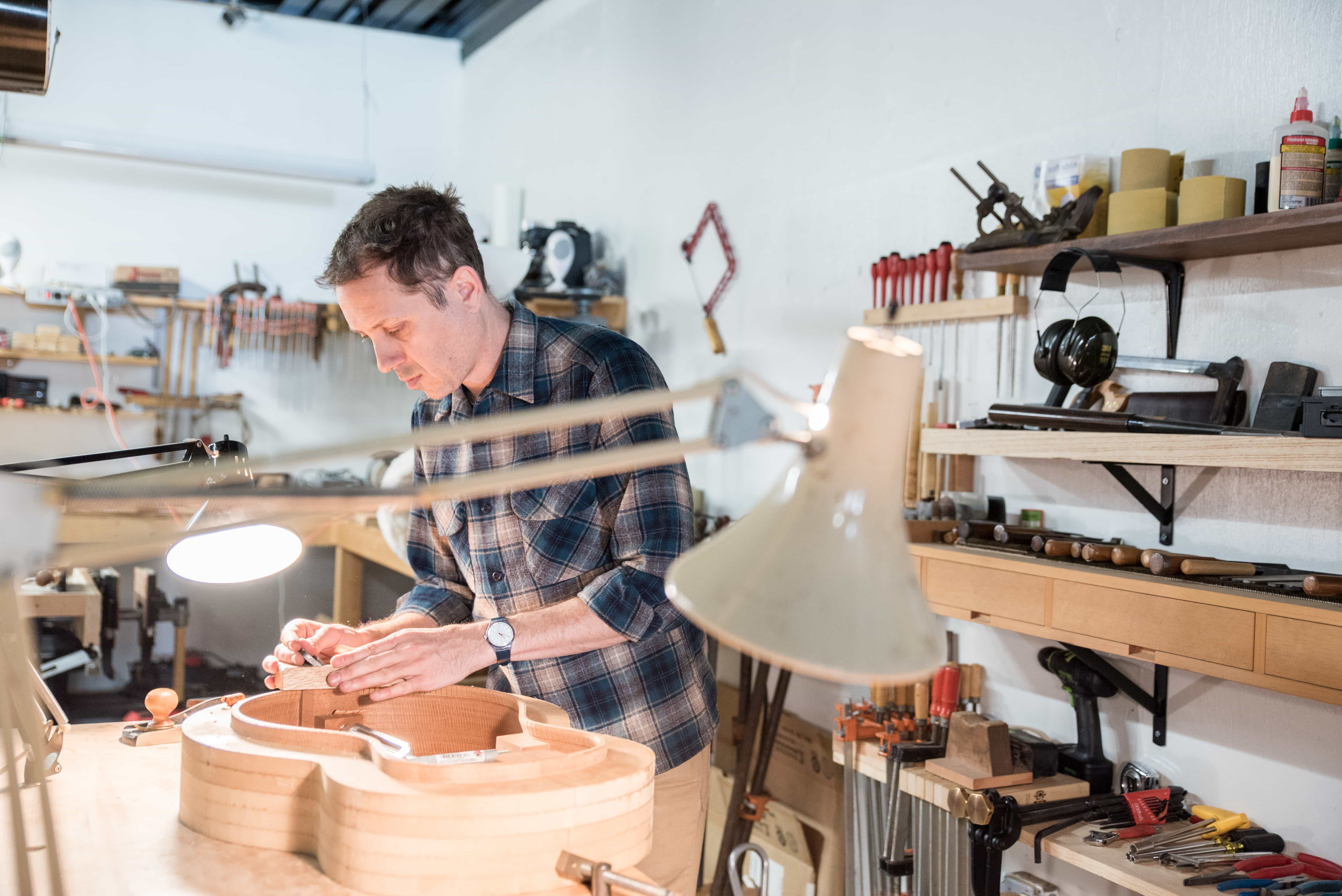
Environmental portrait of guitar luthier

There are essentially four approaches that can be taken in photographic portraiture—the constructionist, environmental, candid, and creative approach. Each has been used over time for different reasons be they technical, artistic or cultural.

The constructionist approach is when the photographer constructs an idea around the subject. It is the approach used in most studio and social photography. It is also used extensively in advertising and marketing when an idea has to be put across.

The environmental approach depicts the subject in their environment. They are often shown as doing something which relates directly to the subject.

The candid approach is where people are photographed without their knowledge going about their daily business. Whilst this approach taken by the paparazzi has been criticised, less invasive and exploitative candid photography has given the world important images of people in various situations and places over the last century. The images of Parisians by Doisneau and Henri Cartier-Bresson demonstrate this approach. As with environmental photography, candid photography is important as a historical source of information about people.

The creative approach is where manipulation of the image is used to change the final output.

=== Mobile portraiture ===
The documentary I Am Chicago was an experiment in mobile full-body portraiture, using natural light and a moving truck as a studio. The project aimed to break down traditional barriers of access to the art form.

=== Senior portraits ===
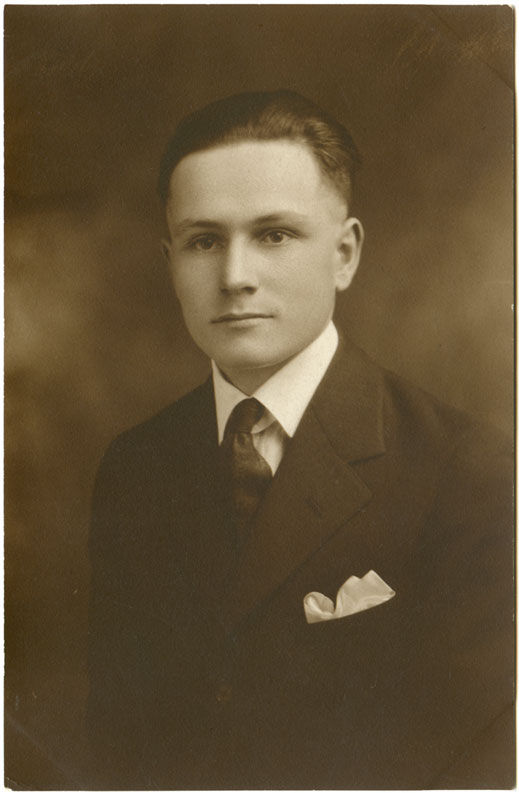
Senior portrait c. 1920

In North America, senior portraits are formal portraits taken of students throughout their senior year of high school. Senior portraits are often included in graduation announcements, as "senior sunday" posts on social media or are printed and given to friends and family. They are also used in yearbooks and are usually rendered larger than their underclassmen counterparts and are often featured in colour, even if the rest of the yearbook is mostly reproduced in black and white. In some schools the requirements are strict regarding the choice of photographer or in the style of portraiture, with only traditional-style portraits being acceptable. Many schools choose to contract one photographer for their yearbook portraits, while other schools allow many different photographers to submit yearbook portraits. Senior portraits have become a cultural rite of passage in the United States, representing a momentous achievement in a young person's life and serving as a tangible reminder of their high school years for years to come.

==== Traditional ====
Formal senior portraits date back at least to the 1880s in the US. Some traditional senior portrait sittings include a cap and gown and other changes of clothing, portrait styles and poses.

In some schools a portrait studio is invited to the school to ensure all senior portraits (for the yearbook) are similar in pose and style, and so that students who cannot afford to purchase these portraits on their own or choose not to purchase portraits will appear in the yearbook the same as other students. Other schools allow students to choose a studio and submit portraits on their own.

==== Modern ====
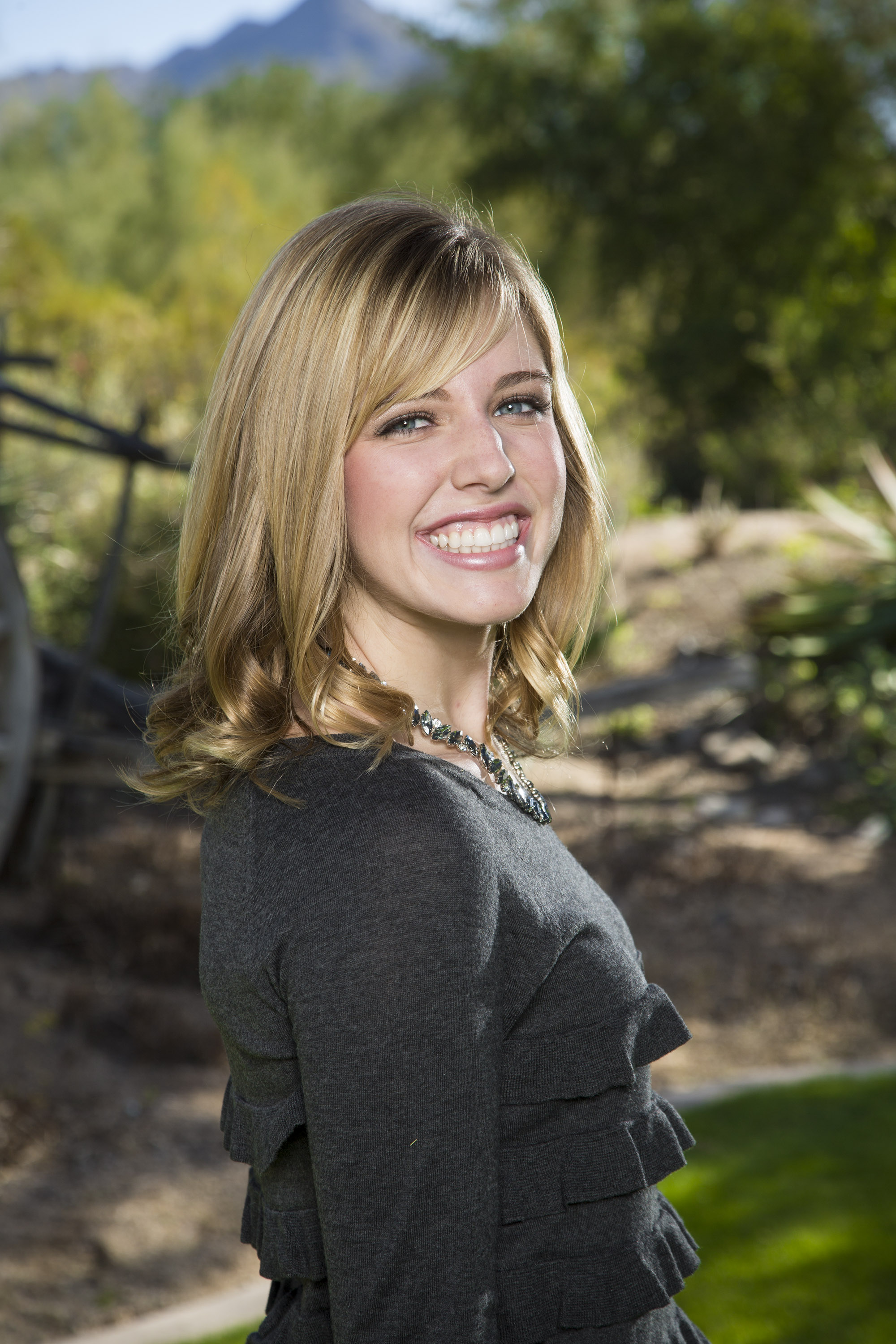
Contemporary high school senior portrait (2014)

Modern senior portraits may include virtually any pose or clothing choice within the limits of good taste. Students often appear with pets, student athletes pose in letterman jackets or their playing uniforms, and many choose fashion photography. Outdoor photos are popular at locations that are scenic or important to the senior. Picture proofs are usually available to view online the next day which are lower quality, unedited and often with a watermark of the studio.

== Lenses ==
Portrait lens "classic" focal lengths, by format
Format	F.L. (mm)		
Format	32°	18°	12.5°
μ43	37.5	67.5	100
APS-C	50	90	130
35 mm	75	135	200
6×6	140	250	360
4×5	300	500	750
8×10	550	1000	1500

Lenses typically used in portrait photography are fast, moderate focal length telephoto lenses, though any lens may be used, depending on artistic intent and how much of the subject is being captured. The classic portrait which focuses on a subject's head alone or their head and shoulders may be more flattering when captured with the slight compression provided by a telephoto lens ranging from 1.5 to 2× the focal length of a normal lens. For environmental portraits, which capture the subject in full length within their surroundings, a wide angle lens is more suitable.

=== Focal length ===
Typical lenses for portraits in which the subject is framed to capture their head and shoulders have a focal length between 75 and 135 mm for 135 film format cameras, which yield an angle of view (on the diagonal) between 18 and 32°. These are the classic portrait lens focal lengths which correspond to approximately 1.5 to 2.5× the focal length of a normal lens. For medium and large format cameras, the same angles of view require a lens with a focal length from approximately 150 to 400 mm, depending on the specific frame size. Such a field of view provides a flattening perspective distortion. In this range, the difference in perspective distortion between 85mm and 135mm lenses is rather subtle.

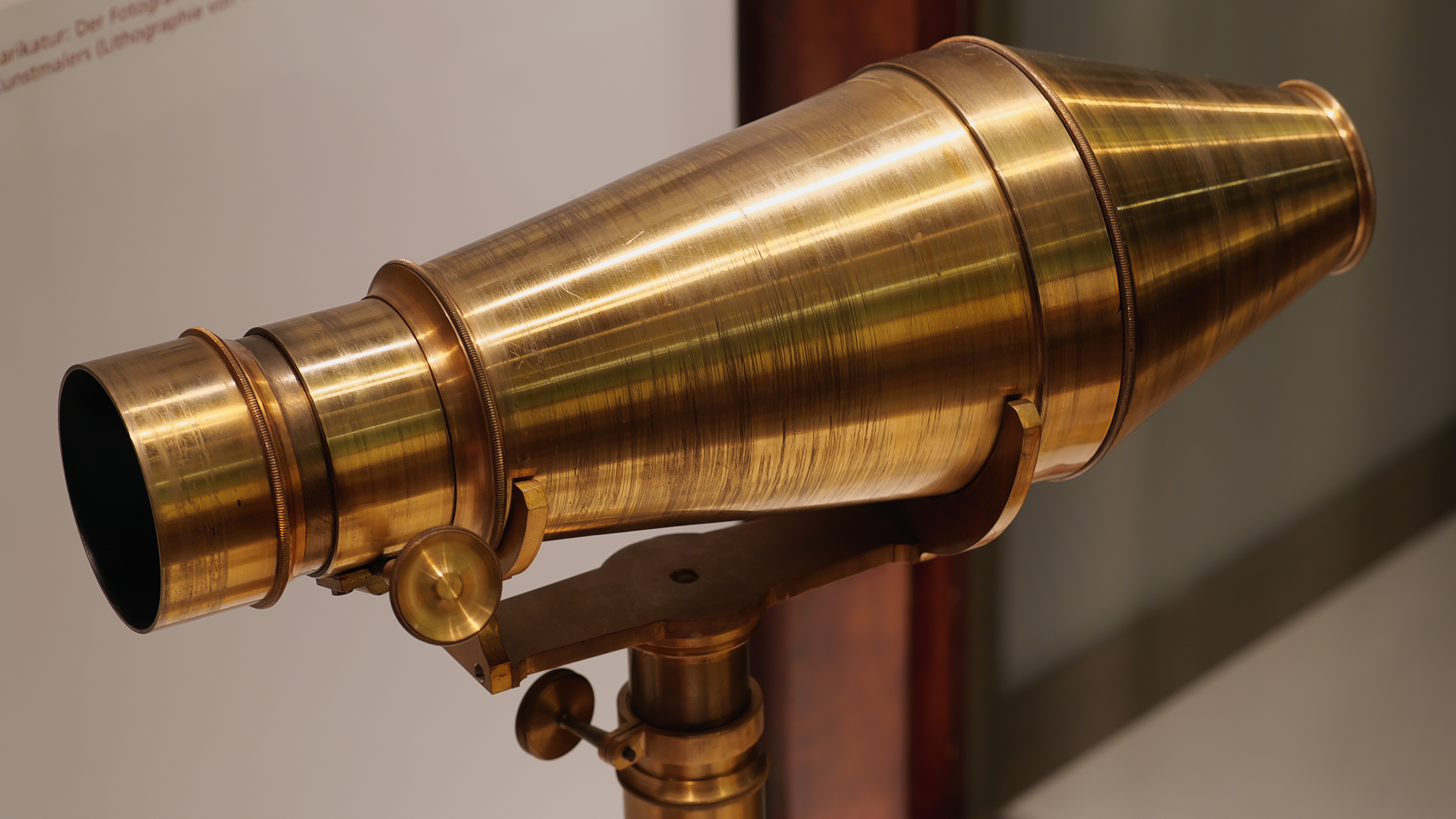
Petzval Portrait lens fitted to Voigtländer camera, c. 1840

The first dedicated portrait lens was the Petzval lens developed in 1840 by Joseph Petzval for the Voigtländer camera. It had a field of view of 30°, a focal length of 150 mm, and a fast f-number of f/3.6, composed of four elements in three groups.

It is suggested that "normal" focal lengths should be used to capture figure portraits in full-length figure. These include 50 mm lenses (47°) for the 35mm film format. Groups up to 3 m (9.8 ft) wide can be captured with a moderate wide angle lens, such as a 35 mm lens (63.5°) for the 35mm film format.

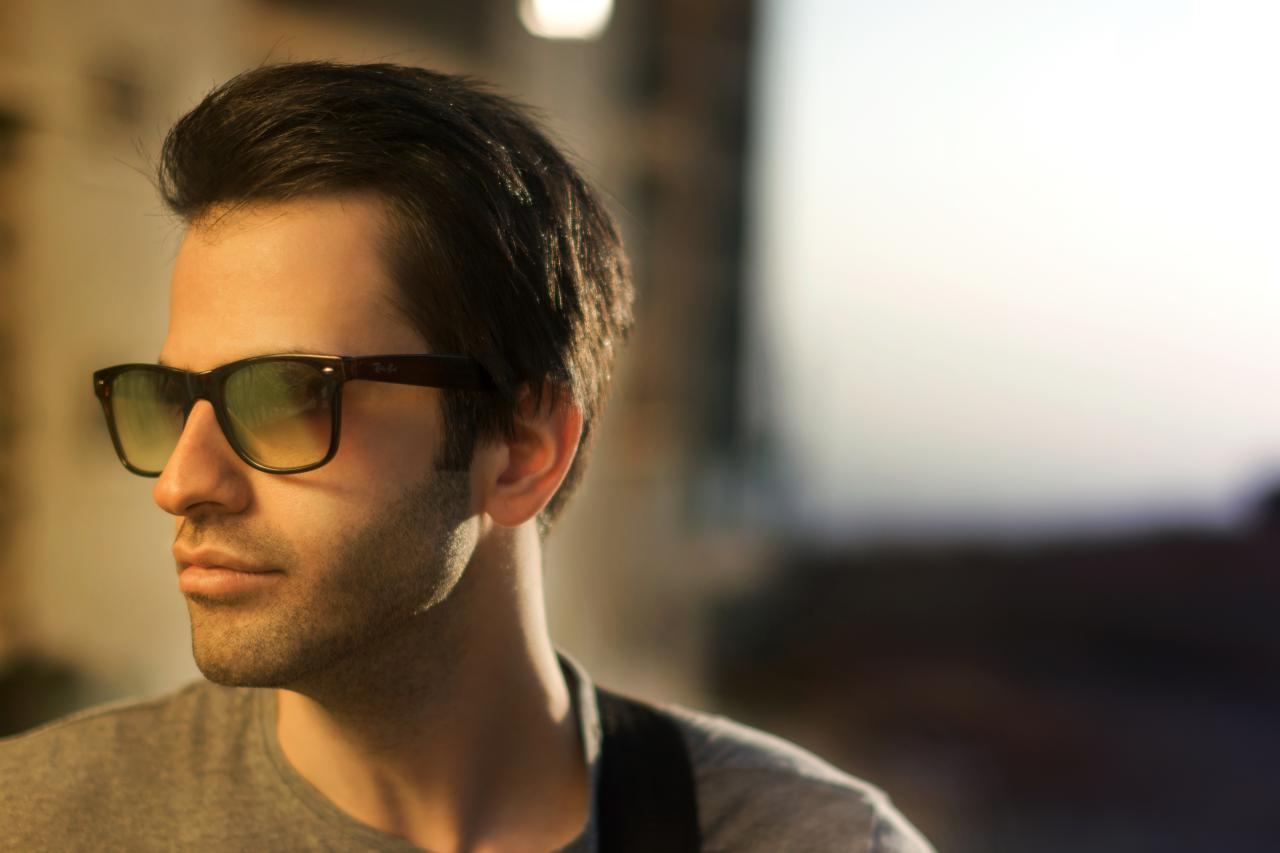
Portrait of a man with a defocused background. Taken with 50 mm f/1.4 lens, resulting in shallow depth of field.

Outside of these suggested ranges, more extreme wide-angle lenses – or even fisheye lenses – may be used for artistic effect, especially to produce a grotesque image. Using lenses with shorter focal lengths (and correspondingly greater angles of view) require the portrait be taken from closer (for an equivalent field size), and the resulting perspective distortion yields a relatively larger nose and smaller ears, which is considered unflattering and imp-like.

Conversely, longer focal lengths yield greater flattening because they are used from further away. However, this makes communication difficult and reduces rapport. They may be used, however, particularly in fashion photography, but longer lengths require a loudspeaker or walkie-talkie to communicate with the subject or assistants. 200 mm (4× "normal") is suggested as the upper limit for comfortable portraiture with 35 mm film cameras, giving an angle of view of 12.5°.

=== Primes and zooms ===
Most often a prime lens will be used, since primes in general are lighter, cheaper, faster, and higher quality. In addition, a zoom lens is not necessary for posed shots and zoom lenses can introduce highly unflattering geometric distortion (barrel distortion or pincushion distortion). However, zoom lenses may be useful, particularly in candid shots where it may not be feasible to change lenses or to encourage creative framing. A typical short telephoto 70–200 mm zoom lens (for 35mm format cameras) spans the full range of suggested focal lengths for head-and-shoulders portraits, and a wide-to-telephoto 35–135 mm zoom can be used for the entire gamut of portrait situations, from a small group to an individual subject's head-and-shoulders.

=== Lens speed ===
Speed-wise, fast lenses (wide aperture) are preferred, as these allow shallow depth of field which ensures the subject is in focus while simultaneously blurring the background; this helps isolate the subject from the background and focus attention on them. This is particularly useful in the field, where the photographer may not have a back drop to place behind the subject, and the background may be distracting. However, extremely wide apertures are less frequently used, because they have a very shallow depth of field and thus the subject's face will not be completely in focus. Stopping the lens down by one or two stops will help ensure sufficient depth of field so the entire face is in focus, when the nominal focus point is placed on the subject's eyes.

The details of bokeh in the resulting defocused areas are accordingly also a consideration; some lenses, in particular the "DC" (Defocus Control) types by Nikon, are designed to give the photographer control over this aspect, by providing an additional ring acting only on the correction of spherical aberration to adjust the quality of the defocused areas, without influencing the point of focus; hence, these are not soft-focus lenses, which affect the spherical aberration of all areas.

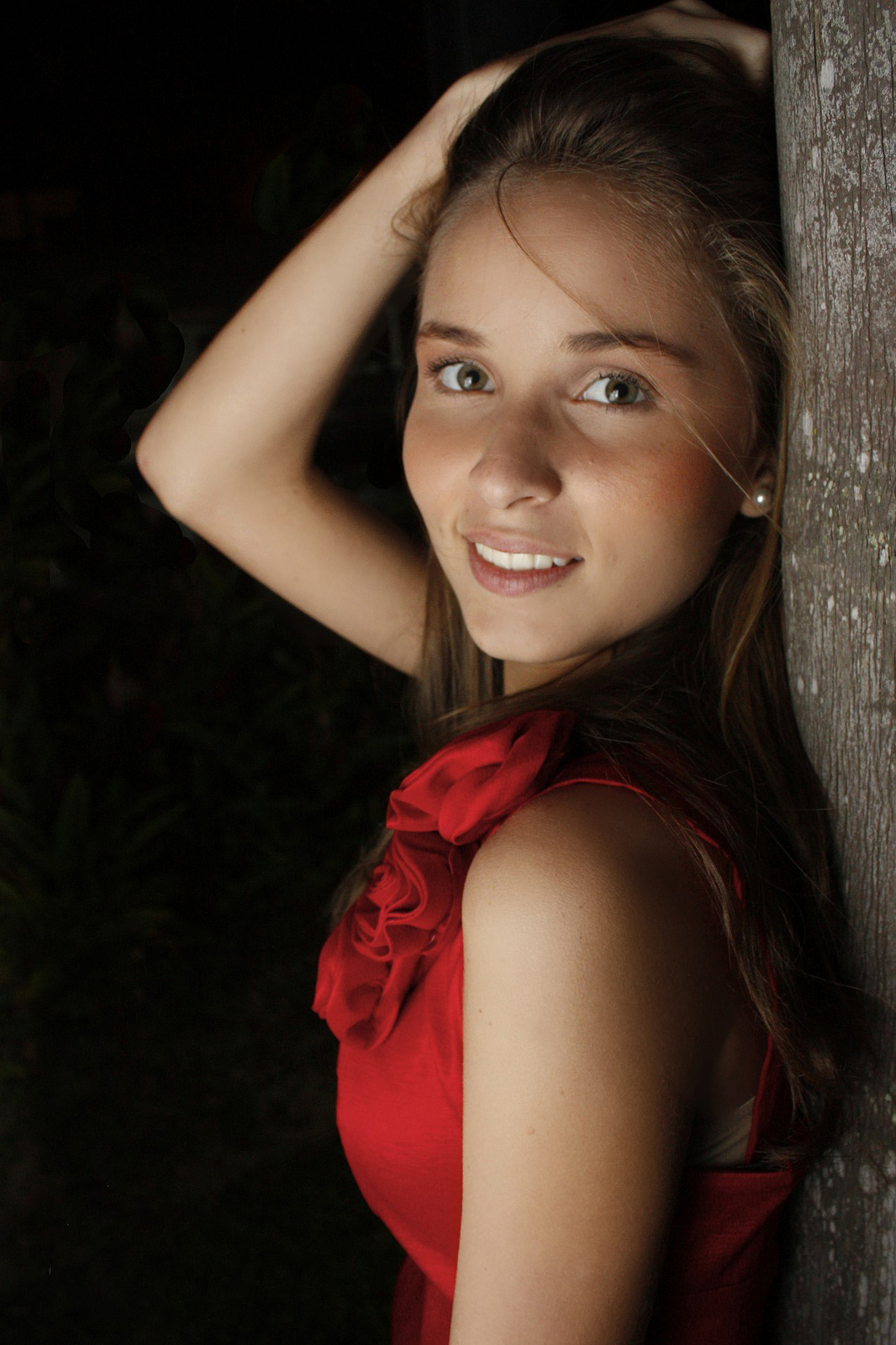
Portrait taken with an 18mm wide-angle lens and an aperture of f/4.5 on an APS-C camera, resulting in fairly large depth of field

Conversely, in environmental portraits, where the subject is shown in their environment, rather than isolated from it, background blur is less desirable and may be undesirable, and wider angle lenses may be used to show more context.

=== Additional considerations ===
Finally, soft focus resulting from deliberately undercorrected spherical aberration is sometimes a desired effect, particularly in glamour photography where the "gauzy" look and smoothing effect may flatter the subject. The Canon EF 135mm f/2.8 with Softfocus is an example of a lens designed with a controllable amount of soft focus.

Portrait lenses are often relatively inexpensive, because they can be built simply, and the focal lengths are close to the normal range. The cheapest portrait lenses are normal lenses (50 mm), used on a cropped sensor. For example, the Canon EF 50mm f/1.8 II is the least expensive Canon lens, but when used on a 1.6× cropped sensor yields an 80mm equivalent focal length, which is at the wide end of portrait lenses.

== See also ==
- Catchlight
- Mug shot
- Portrait photographers
- Selfie
- Street portrait
