= RedEye =

Daily newspaper in Chicago

- The December 6, 2010 front page of RedEye
- Type: Weekly newspaper
- Format: Tabloid
- Owner: Tribune Publishing
- Editor: Lauren Chval
- Founded: October 2002
- Ceased publication: March 19, 2020
- Headquarters: Chicago, Illinois, United States
- Circulation: 250,000
- Website: www.redeyechicago.com

RedEye was a publication put out by the Chicago Tribune geared toward 18 to 34-year-olds. It was published every weekday since its inception in 2002 until February 3, 2017. Publication was reduced to weekly starting February 9, 2017. Daily circulation was 250,000 as of December 2, 2009. The final issue was published March 19, 2020, a coronavirus edition.

== Competition ==
RedEye was created because of the Chicago Tribune and other major newspapers' loss of readership among young people. Tribune Company began publishing the RedEye in an effort to pull readers back into readership and eventually migrate them into the big edition (Tribune).

When RedEye appeared, it was in direct competition with another paper Red Streak, which the Tribune's Chicago competitor the Sun-Times began publishing at the same time. Initially, both papers were handed out for free by "hawkers" on street corners, usually with one vendor from each paper directly next to each other. After about six months of the free papers, both companies placed vending boxes throughout the city with the papers thereafter costing 25 cents. At the end of 2005, the Sun-Times discontinued Red Streak. According to Sun-Times publisher John Cruickshank, Red Streak was only launched "to stop [the Tribune] from gaining a foothold in the paid tabloid market". Its only purpose was to undermine RedEye's attempt at drawing commuters, customers which have historically belonged to the Sun-Times. At the beginning of 2006, RedEye became a free paper once again, with vending boxes being unlocked and coin slots covered over.

In February 2007, after NewsCorp launched a late-night talk television program on Fox News entitled Red Eye, the Tribune Company filed a federal trademark infringement lawsuit.

== Content ==
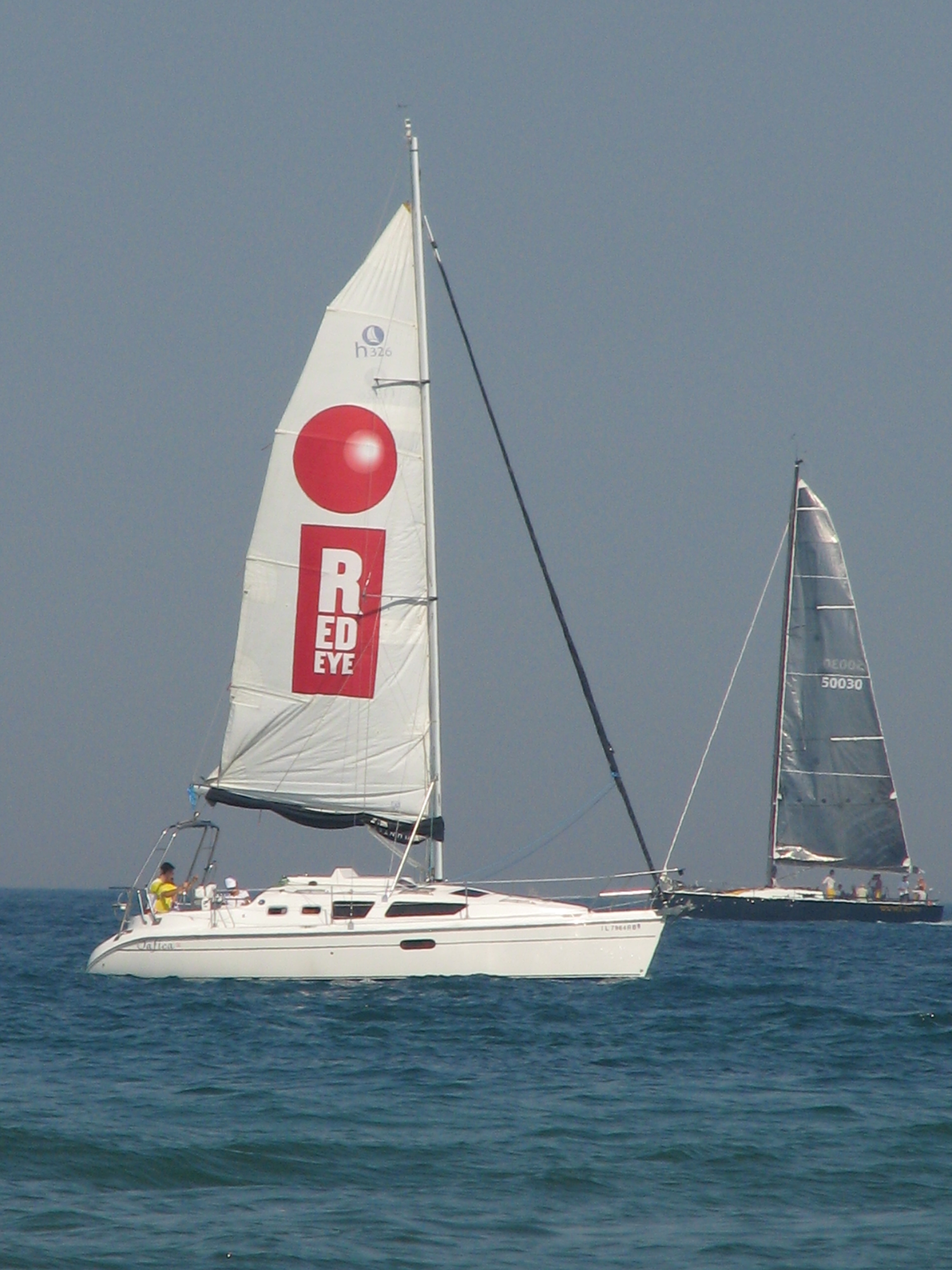
A RedEye sailboat on Labor Day 2007 viewed from North Avenue Beach

As compared with mainstream newspapers, RedEye strongly emphasized pop culture and entertainment news, humorous or lighthearted rather than serious columns, and flashy graphics and large pictures. Like the Chicago Sun-Times, RedEye is a tabloid-format newspaper, oriented vertically rather than horizontally and with a front page consisting only of a large picture and a banner headline.

== Publication changes ==
After 15 years of daily distribution, RedEye shifted to a weekly format in 2017 before it stopped publishing in 2020 during the COVID-19 pandemic.
