= WNVR =

- Vernon Hills, Illinois; United States
- Broadcast area: Chicago metropolitan area
- Frequency: 1030 kHz
- Branding: Polskie Radio Chicago

Programming
- Format: Polish

Ownership
- Owner: Polnet Communications, Ltd.
- Sister stations: WEEF, WKTA, WPJX

History
- First air date: March 1, 1988
- Call sign meaning: "News World Radio" (former format)

Technical information
- Licensing authority: FCC
- Facility ID: 52910
- Class: D
- Power: 10,000 watts (day); 3,200 watts (critical hours); 120 watts (night)
- Transmitter coordinates: 42°15′10.08″N 88°23′45.31″W
- Translators: 104.7 W284DA (Chicago); 107.1 W296DA (Vernon Hills)

Links
- Public license information: Public file; LMS
- Webcast: Listen live
- Website: polskieradio.com

WNVR (1030 AM, "Polskie Radio Chicago") is a commercial radio station licensed to Vernon Hills, Illinois, United States, serving the Chicago metropolitan area. WNVR is one of eight stations owned by Polnet Communications. Studios are located at 3656 W. Belmont Ave. in Chicago, and the transmitter is sited off Illinois Route 176, west of Crystal Lake, Illinois. Programming is also heard on low-power FM translators W284DA at 104.7 MHz in Chicago and W296DA at 107.1 MHz in Vernon Hills.

== History ==
WNVR began broadcasting March 1, 1988, airing an all-news format. The station's call sign stood for "News Voice Radio", its slogan at the time. WNVR was originally owned by Midwest Radio Associates, and ran 500 watts during daytime hours only, with its transmitter located in Mundelein, Illinois.

By 1989, the station had adopted a business news format, with programming from the Business Radio Network.

In 1993, WNVR was sold to Polnet Communications for $495,000, and the station adopted a Polish language format.

Logo while simulcasting on WRDZ

In 2000, nighttime operations were added, running 5 watts. Daytime power was increased that year to 5,000 watts (3,200 watts critical hours), using a directional array, with the station's daytime transmitter moving to its present location, west of Crystal Lake. In 2003, the station's nighttime power was increased to 120 watts, using a directional array at its present location. In 2009, the station's daytime power was increased to 10,000 watts.

== Translator ==
Call sign	Frequency	City of license	FID	ERP (W)	Class	Transmitter coordinates	FCC info
W296DA	107.1 FM	Vernon Hills, Illinois	157668	217	D	42°23′17″N 88°5′40″W	LMS
