= Chicago Life =

American magazine

Chicago Life is a magazine included every other month in the Sunday edition of The New York Times in the Chicago area.

== History and profile ==
Chicago Life was started in 1984 as a bimonthly independent magazine. In July 1987 it began to be published monthly. During the entirety of its run, Pam Berns was the publisher.

In the summer of 2026, after 41 years, Pam Berns retired as publisher of Chicago Life. Beginning with the 2026 June/Summer issue, longtime associate editor Frank Schweihs and associate publisher Mike Kerns transitioned into the position, changing the title to Chicago Living Magazine. Under Chicago Living Magazine, editorial focus remains largely unchanged, with the same writing contributors and distribution bimonthly throughout the city with The New York Times

Among its topics are politics, health, the arts, and style. Contributors to the publication often include: Pam Berns (Publisher), Jessica Curry (Editor), Jane Ammeson (Interviews), Marilyn Soltis (Home), Brett Neveu (Theatre), Pamela Dittmer McKuen (Style), Cory Franklin (Health), Sigalit Zetouni (Art) and Amelia Levin (Dining), and Christopher Johnson (Environment).
