= WPJX =

- Zion, Illinois; United States
- Broadcast area: Lake County, Illinois; Kenosha County, Wisconsin
- Frequency: 1500 kHz
- Branding: Rebel Radio

Programming
- Format: Heavy metal

Ownership
- Owner: Polnet Communications, Ltd.
- Operator: Rebel Chicago Media, Inc.
- Sister stations: WKTA, WEEF, WNVR

History
- First air date: September 19, 1967 (as WZBN)
- Former call signs: WZBN (1967–1977); WKZN (1977–1983); WNIZ (1983–1984); WRJR (1984–1987); WKGA (1987–1996); WTAU (1996–1998); WDDZ (1998–2001)

Technical information
- Licensing authority: FCC
- Facility ID: 49293
- Class: D
- Power: 250 watts day; 2 watts night
- Transmitter coordinates: 42°27′19.08″N 87°54′3.27″W
- Translator: 92.5 W223CN (Zion)
- Repeater: 1300 WRDZ (La Grange)

Links
- Public license information: Public file; LMS
- Webcast: Listen live
- Website: rebelradio.com

WPJX (1500 AM) is a radio station, licensed to Zion, Illinois, that airs a heavy metal format. The station is owned by Polnet Communications, which also owns WKTA in Evanston, WNVR in Vernon Hills, and WEEF in Highland Park-Deerfield. The station transmits with a directional 250 watts of power from three towers located on the corner of Delany Road and 21st Street near Wadsworth, Illinois. The station's daytime signal serves northern Lake County, Illinois, and Kenosha County, Wisconsin. WPJX was licensed to operate during daytime hours only until May 2009, when it began broadcasting 24 hours a day with a power of 250 watts daytime and 2 watts nighttime. The station has an extremely weak signal null to the north and south.

== History ==
The station first began broadcasting on September 19, 1967, and originally held the call sign WZBN. The station was originally owned by the Zion-Benton Broadcasting Company.

The station was once co-owned with WKZN 96.9 (later WNIZ and now WWDV) and had studios in downtown Zion during this period. In 1977, the station's call sign was changed to WKZN. As WKZN, it aired an MOR-adult contemporary format, simulcasting the programming of WKZN-FM 96.9.

In 1983, the station's call sign was changed to WNIZ, and the station began airing a classical music format, simulcasting the programming of its sister stations WNIZ-FM 96.9 and WNIB 97.1. In 1984, Lake County Broadcasting Co. purchased the station from Northern Illinois Broadcasting Co. for $200,000. On December 1, 1984, the station's call sign was changed to WRJR.

On December 1, 1987, the station's call sign was changed to WKGA. As WKGA, the station aired a Spanish music format and was branded "Radio Borinquen".

On November 7, 1994, WKGA adopted a classic country format. In early 1996, the station was sold to Lotus Communications Corporation for $210,000, and it adopted a regional Mexican format, simulcasting the programming of sister station 1300 WTAQ. On June 24, 1996, the station's call sign was changed to WTAU.

In 1998, the station was sold to ABC Radio, and on July 16, the station became an affiliate of Radio Disney along with its sister station WTAQ, and the station began broadcasting in AM stereo using the C-QUAM system. On December 3, the station's call sign was changed to WDDZ. The station continued to simulcast Radio Disney with its sister station WRDZ until it was taken off the air on January 14, 2000.

A short-lived LMA to the owners of WBJX in Racine, Wisconsin (now WJTI), brought the station back on the air in January 2001, simulcasting WBJX and airing a regional Mexican format. On May 16, 2001, the station's callsign was changed to WPJX. The station again signed off the air in October 2001. It returned to the air permanently in spring 2002, first with its previous format, a simulcast of the Radio Disney station WRDZ.

In 2002, Multicultural Broadcasting of Chicago, Inc. purchased the station from ABC Radio for $70,000. Under Multicultural's ownership it aired an oldies format.

In 2006, Polnet bought the station from Multicultural Broadcasting for $230,000. When Polnet bought the station, it switched to a Spanish-language reggaeton format. In February 2009, the heavy metal format "Rebel Radio" began airing full-time on the station. "Rebel Radio" was replaced by a syndicated Spanish format in mid-February 2011.

On October 1, 2018, at noon, the heavy metal format of "Rebel Radio" returned to WPJX, after an eight-year hiatus. During the first day back, Rebel Radio aired only the "Big 4" thrash metal bands: Metallica, Megadeth, Anthrax, and Slayer.

== Translator ==
WPJX is also heard on 92.5 MHz, through an FM translator.

Broadcast translator for WPJX
Call sign	Frequency	City of license	FID	ERP (W)	HAAT	Class	Transmitter coordinates	FCC info
W223CN	92.5 FM	Zion, Illinois	142464	65	94 m (308 ft)	D	42°26′34.8″N 88°3′26.4″W	LMS
