= I Am Chicago =

Documentary project by Adam Novak and Sara Collins

I Am Chicago is a documentary photography and video project by Adam Novak and Sara Collins. It comprises full-body portraits and video footage of pedestrians in thirty neighborhoods across Chicago, spanning the years 2009 to 2011. It evolved into a gallery of photographs and a website, showcasing the tremendous richness of how Chicagoans present themselves to the public. The gallery reveals the faces, bodies, attitudes, clothes, accessories, and tools of everyday life that people carry with them, undergoing significant changes from North to South and East to West in Chicago.

The photographers used a rental moving truck as a portrait studio, making use of natural light from the translucent roof of the truck. Each neighborhood of Chicago is represented through a careful selection of portraits of its citizens as they passed by the street corner studio in the course of a single day. To encourage Chicagoans to pose, a professional studio portrait was printed on the spot and given to each participant for free.

The project garnered the attention of the Chicago Reader in early 2011, when NBC 5 Chicago used the words "We Are Chicago" for its advertising campaign.
