= WEDE-CD =

Television station in Arlington Heights, Illinois

- Arlington Heights–Chicago, Illinois; United States
- City: Arlington Heights, Illinois
- Channels: Digital: 28 (UHF); Virtual: 34
- Branding: MCTV

Programming
- Affiliations: 34.1/.2/.3: Religious Independent

Ownership
- Owner: First United, Inc.

History
- First air date: 1989
- Former call signs: W17BD (1989–1998); W34CK (1998–2005); WEDE-CA (2005–2014)
- Former channel numbers: Analog: 17 (UHF, 1989–1998), 34 (UHF, 1998–2014)
- Former affiliations: FamilyNet (1989–2017); Polvision (2017–20??)

Technical information
- Licensing authority: FCC
- Facility ID: 66978
- Class: CD
- ERP: 2.84 kW
- HAAT: 445.5 m (1,462 ft)
- Transmitter coordinates: 41°52′44.1″N 87°38′10.2″W

Links
- Public license information: Public file; LMS

WEDE-CD (channel 34), branded MCTV, is a low-power, Class A religious independent television station licensed to Arlington Heights, Illinois, United States, serving the Chicago area. The station is owned by First United, Inc.

== History ==
WEDE-CD's beginnings were as a translator station on channel 17 since its inception in 1989. It moved to channel 34 in 1998 and the call letters were changed to W34CK. The station received Class A status with their new call letters as WEDE-CA in 2005. Channel 34 was once an affiliate of FamilyNet while also airing some religious programming and infomercials. Around 2008, its programming began to be simulcast on WJYS' second digital subchannel.

After the full-power digital transition in June 2009, WEDE-CA began to receive increased signal coverage from its transmitter at Willis Tower since, as a low-power station, it was not obligated at the time to convert to digital. In the summer of 2014, WEDE-CA turned off its analog signal on channel 34 and flash cut to digital as WEDE-CD. It currently reaches about 8 million people in the Chicago market and continues to serve its surrounding areas as MCTV.

== Subchannels ==
The station's signal is multiplexed:

Subchannels of WEDE-CD
| Subchannel | Res. | Short name | Programming |
|---|---|---|---|
| 34.1 | 480i | WEDE | Main WEDE-CD programming (4:3) |
| 34.2 | 480i | RETRO | Main WEDE-CD programming (4:3) |
| 34.3 | 480i | GEM | Main WEDE-CD programming (4:3) |
