= Edward Felsenthal =

American journalist and former editor-in-chief of Time magazine

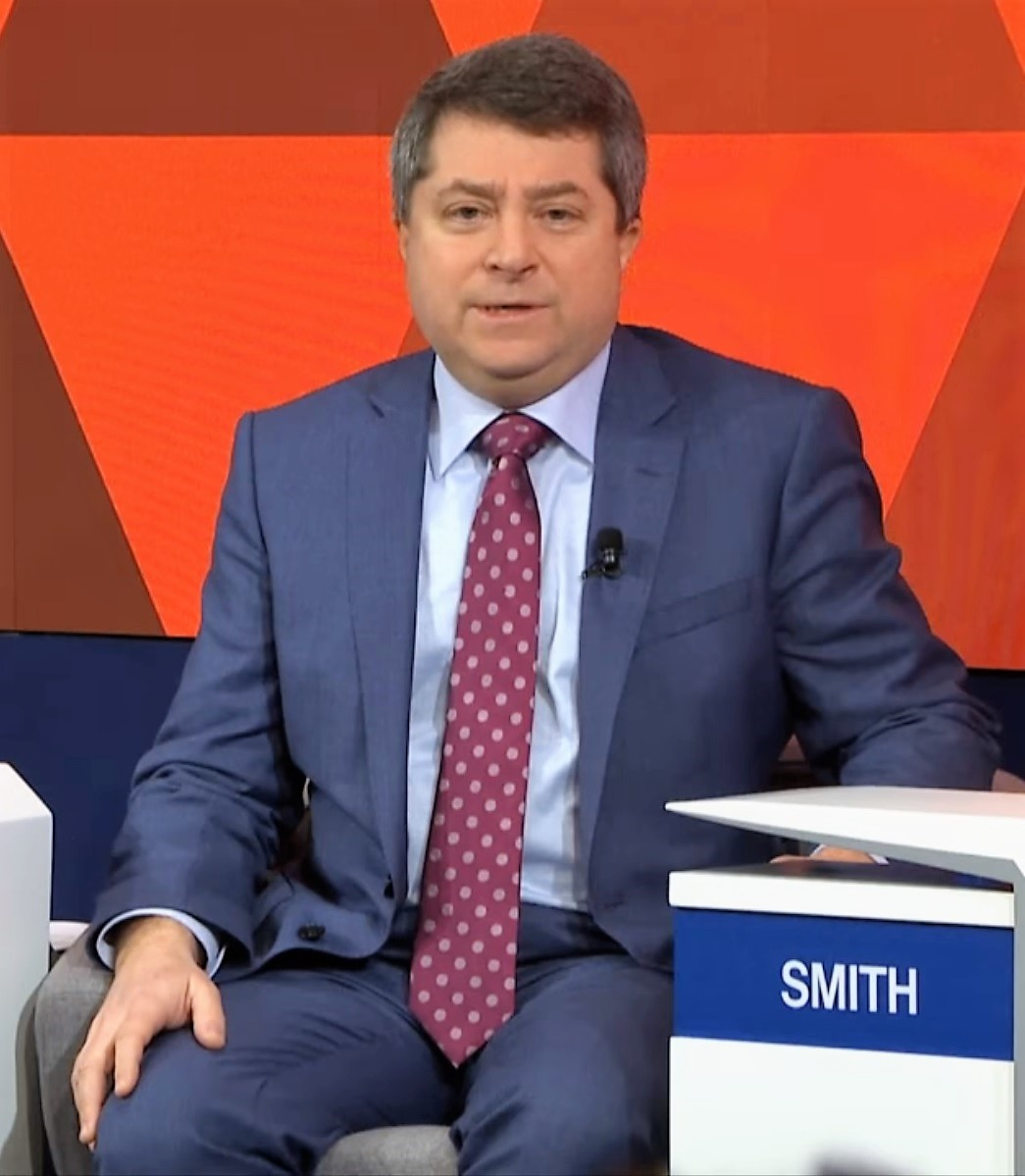
- Felsenthal in 2018
- Born: September 3, 1966 (age 60); Memphis, Tennessee, U.S.
- Education: Princeton University (A.B.); Harvard University (J.D.); Tufts University (MALD)
- Occupation: Editor-in-chief of Time

Edward Felsenthal (born September 3, 1966) is an American journalist. He is a former editor-in-chief and CEO of Time, a biweekly news magazine. He currently serves as Senior Advisor in the Office of the CEO at Salesforce, and as Executive Chairman of Time.

== Early life ==
Felsenthal was born into a Jewish family on September 3, 1966, in Memphis, Tennessee, where he attended Memphis University School. Felsenthal graduated with an A.B. from the Woodrow Wilson School of Public and International Affairs at Princeton University in 1988 after completing a 149-page long senior thesis titled "The Super Tuesday Strategy: Democratic Response to Transformations in Southern Politics." He then received a Juris Doctor degree from Harvard Law School, and a Master of Arts in Law and Diplomacy from the Fletcher School of Law and Diplomacy at Tufts University.

== Career ==
Felsenthal began his career at The Wall Street Journal, where he covered the US Supreme Court and later became an editor overseeing the Journal's efforts to expand its consumer and lifestyle coverage. He was the founding editor of the "Personal Journal" section, guiding work that led to two Pulitzer Prizes, and later oversaw news strategy and integration of the print and digital teams. He was named Deputy Managing Editor of the Journal in 2005.

In 2008, he worked with Tina Brown to launch The Daily Beast as the first executive editor.

He joined Time in 2013 as Digital Managing Editor, where he led an expansion that established a 24/7 news and video operation. In 2016, he became Group Digital Director for Time Inc., overseeing 12 news and lifestyle sites. He became the 18th editor of Time in September 2017, succeeding Nancy Gibbs.

In 2018, Felsenthal led Meredith Corp.’s search for a buyer for TIME, resulting in its sale to Marc Benioff and his wife, Lynne. He remained editor-in-chief, and was named TIME’s CEO.

In 2022, he was named one of the 35 most powerful people in New York media by The Hollywood Reporter, for having “turned TIME’s fortunes around”. That year, he also received Fletcher School’s Class of 1947 Award.

In 2024, he was named to Princeton University's Board of Trustees.He is also on the board of the non-profit newspaper The Daily Memphian.
