= Naham 3 hijacking =

Hijacking of FV Naham 3

The Naham 3 hijacking was the capture of an Omani-flagged fishing vessel by Somali pirates on 26 March 2012, approximately 65 nautical miles south of the Seychelles, with 29 crew members from six countries aboard. The vessel's captain was killed during the attack and two further crew members died of illness in captivity. The 26 surviving crew were released on 22 October 2016, after 1,672 days, in one of the longest hostage cases of the Somali piracy era.

== Vessel ==
The Naham 3 was a long-liner fishing outside Somali territorial waters and outside Somalia's exclusive economic zone at the time of the attack. Oceans Beyond Piracy has reported that resentment over illegal, unreported and unregulated fishing by foreign vessels in Somali waters contributed to local support for piracy.

== Background ==
Modern Somali piracy emerged after the collapse of the Siad Barre regime in 1991. The first recorded hijacking for ransom took place in 1994, and by 2005 the model had become dominant, with recorded incidents rising from two to fourteen in a single year. As merchant vessels adopted protective measures and naval patrols expanded, pirates extended their range, attacking ships more than 1,000 nautical miles from the Somali coast by 2010. The Naham 3 was seized in March 2012, near the end of this period; the last major merchant vessel taken by Somali pirates, the tanker MT Smyrni, was hijacked six weeks later.

== Hijacking ==
The Naham 3 was seized on 26 March 2012, approximately 65 nautical miles south of the Seychelles.

The vessel's captain was killed during the attack. According to the United States Department of Justice, whose account is drawn from evidence presented at the 2023 trial of two men involved in the later captivity of the journalist Michael Scott Moore aboard the vessel, the hostage-takers murdered the captain when they captured the ship and kept his body in the vessel's freezer. Shen Jui-chang, the ship's engineer and one of the surviving crew, said after his release that the captain was shot after attacking the pirates with a chair, describing him as having sacrificed himself for the crew. Oceans Beyond Piracy recorded the death as resulting from injuries sustained in the attack.

The pirates took the Naham 3 to the Somali coast, more than 800 nautical miles from the position at which she was captured.

== Captivity ==
=== At sea ===
After the hijacking the Naham 3 was taken to the Somali coast and moored alongside the MV Albedo, a container ship that Somali pirates had seized in November 2010.

In 2013 the Albedo sank while still attached to the Naham 3. According to Oceans Beyond Piracy, one of the Vietnamese crew of the Naham 3 entered the water to help rescue the eleven surviving members of the Albedo's crew; John Steed, coordinator of the Hostage Support Partners, described the Naham 3 crew as having jumped into the water to save the drowning seafarers. The survivors were then held below deck aboard the Naham 3 in cramped conditions for approximately a further month.

Between April and August 2012 the American journalist Michael Scott Moore, who had been abducted near Galkayo in January 2012, and Rolly Tambara, a Seychellois fisherman seized off the Somali coast in October 2011, were also held aboard the vessel alongside the crew. Moore later wrote that the crew, who had no common language, communicated in an improvised pidgin, and that rations were distributed along national lines among the Cambodian, Chinese, Filipino, Indonesian, Taiwanese and Vietnamese hostages.

=== Move ashore ===
Roughly a year after its capture the Naham 3 was beached on the Somali coast and the crew were moved inland, where they were held in the bush for the remainder of their captivity. (Note: Reports differ as to whether the vessel was beached or sank.) Steed said the pirates made irrational demands after the crew were brought ashore.

=== Conditions and deaths ===
Oceans Beyond Piracy described the conditions in which the crew were held as squalid, and reported that two crew members died of illness during the captivity. Shen Jui-chang said after his release that the hostages received very little food and were at times denied water, and that they ate mice, scorpions and centipedes in order to survive. Nhem Soksan, one of the four Cambodian crew members, said after his return that the 1,672 days he had spent as a hostage were worse than his experience of living under the Khmer Rouge regime.

At the time of their release all 26 remaining hostages were malnourished, and four required medical treatment from a doctor in Galkayo.

== Negotiations and release ==
The Naham 3 crew were held for considerably longer than most seafarers taken during the Somali piracy era. In its 2015 report, published while the crew were still captive, Oceans Beyond Piracy quoted John Steed as saying that negotiations had stalled because of demands the pirates had made that could not be met by a maritime charity, and describing the crew as coming from poor families in Asia, held ashore, abandoned by their company, without insurance.

Negotiations were ultimately conducted through the Hostage Support Partnership, a grouping that included the United Nations Office on Drugs and Crime and Oceans Beyond Piracy. According to Holman Fenwick Willan, which acted in the case, Leslie Edwards of Compass Risk Management spent 18 months negotiating the release. Steed said the talks involved community, tribal and religious leaders.

A separate effort was mounted on behalf of the Taiwanese engineer Shen Jui-chang. Associated Press reported that Shen's wife and daughter approached the former legislator Tsai Cheng-yuan after failing to obtain help from other officials in Taiwan, and that Tsai raised funds from donors in Taiwan, the Philippines and China. When money had been raised for Shen alone, he refused to be released without the rest of the crew, and the fundraising was extended to cover all of the remaining hostages.

The 26 surviving crew members were released on 22 October 2016 and handed to the Galmudug authorities. Reports of a ransom payment were not independently verified: a pirate identified as Bile Hussein told Associated Press that $1.5 million had been paid, while sources close to the pirates told Voice of America that the figure was $2 million. Steed declined to discuss the terms of the agreement.

Extracting the crew was complicated by fighting between Puntland and Galmudug forces in Galkayo.

== Aftermath ==
The released crew arrived in Nairobi on 23 October 2016.

The four Cambodian crew members - Khorn Van Thy, Em Phummany, Kim Koem Hen and Ngem Sosan - returned to Phnom Penh on 30 October 2016, (Note: The four men's names are transliterated inconsistently across sources; the forms used here follow ISWAN.) where they were met by a welfare responder from the Maritime Piracy Humanitarian Response Programme and by representatives of Caritas; they underwent medical examinations before travelling on to their families. The five Filipino crew members arrived in Manila on 28 October and were provided with counselling by the Overseas Workers Welfare Administration. Shen Jui-chang travelled from Kenya with the Chinese crew members and was reunited with his wife and daughter in Guangzhou before arriving in Taipei, where he said he was in poor physical health.

Following the release, Taiwan's Fisheries Agency said that it would urge the vessel's Taiwanese owner to take responsibility for the crew. The Cambodian government said that it was seeking to identify the companies and brokers that had recruited the four Cambodian crew members for overseas fishing work. Writing in The New Yorker in 2022, Michael Scott Moore reported that the Cambodian crew members had each received a total of $3,700 from the vessel's owners for a year and a half of fishing and nearly five years of captivity, and that one of them considered himself owed at least $10,000 in unpaid wages.

Two men who had held Moore aboard the vessel, Abdi Yusuf Hassan and Mohamed Tahlil Mohamed, were convicted in the Eastern District of New York in February 2023 and sentenced in November 2024 to 30 years' imprisonment each. Hassan had been the minister of interior and security for the Somali region in which Moore was held, and Mohamed a Somali army officer. The prosecution concerned Moore's captivity rather than that of the vessel's crew.

== Significance ==
Oceans Beyond Piracy described the release of the Naham 3 crew as marking the end of captivity for the last seafarers held from the height of Somali piracy. Their captivity was the second longest recorded for hostages held by Somali pirates, after the crew of the FV Prantalay 12.

Commentary on the case focused on the position of fishing crews relative to commercial shipping. John Steed said that hostages without insurance or a well-resourced owner behind them received little assistance, and that many of those left in captivity at the end of the piracy era were poor fishermen. Oceans Beyond Piracy, applying the Maritime Labour Convention minimum wage, estimated that the crews of the Naham 3 and the Prantalay 12 had between them lost approximately $1.06 million in wages during their captivity, and noted that hostages are not paid for time held captive. (Note: Amendments to the Maritime Labour Convention adopted in 2018 require seafarers' wages and other entitlements to continue to be paid throughout a period of captivity resulting from piracy.) Moore reported that most of the Naham 3 crew were not career seafarers but former farmers and labourers recruited through local agencies, in one case for $150 a month.

== See also ==
- Piracy off the coast of Somalia
- MV Albedo
