= Samuel Jacobs (journalist) =

American journalist and magazine editor

- Citizenship: American
- Education: Harvard University
- Occupation: Editor-in-chief of Time

Samuel Posin Jacobs is an American journalist. In April 2023, he was named editor-in-chief of Time magazine, the youngest since Henry Luce, the magazine's co-founder.

== Biography ==
In 2009, Jacobs graduated from Harvard University, where he studied history. The title of his thesis was Walter Weyl and the Progressive Mind: The Promise and Problems of the New Democracy. He was associate managing editor of The Harvard Crimson. Jacobs attended The Roxbury Latin School.

Before coming to Time in 2013, he covered politics for The Daily Beast, edited Newsweek's front of the book section, and was a U.S. campaign correspondent for Reuters.

Jacobs was initially senior editor of time.com and was promoted in 2014 to assistant managing editor the magazine. In 2016, he was promoted to executive editor of Time Digital. He was deputy editor from 2019 until being named editor-in-chief in 2023.
