= Roger Rosenblatt =

American writer (born 1940)

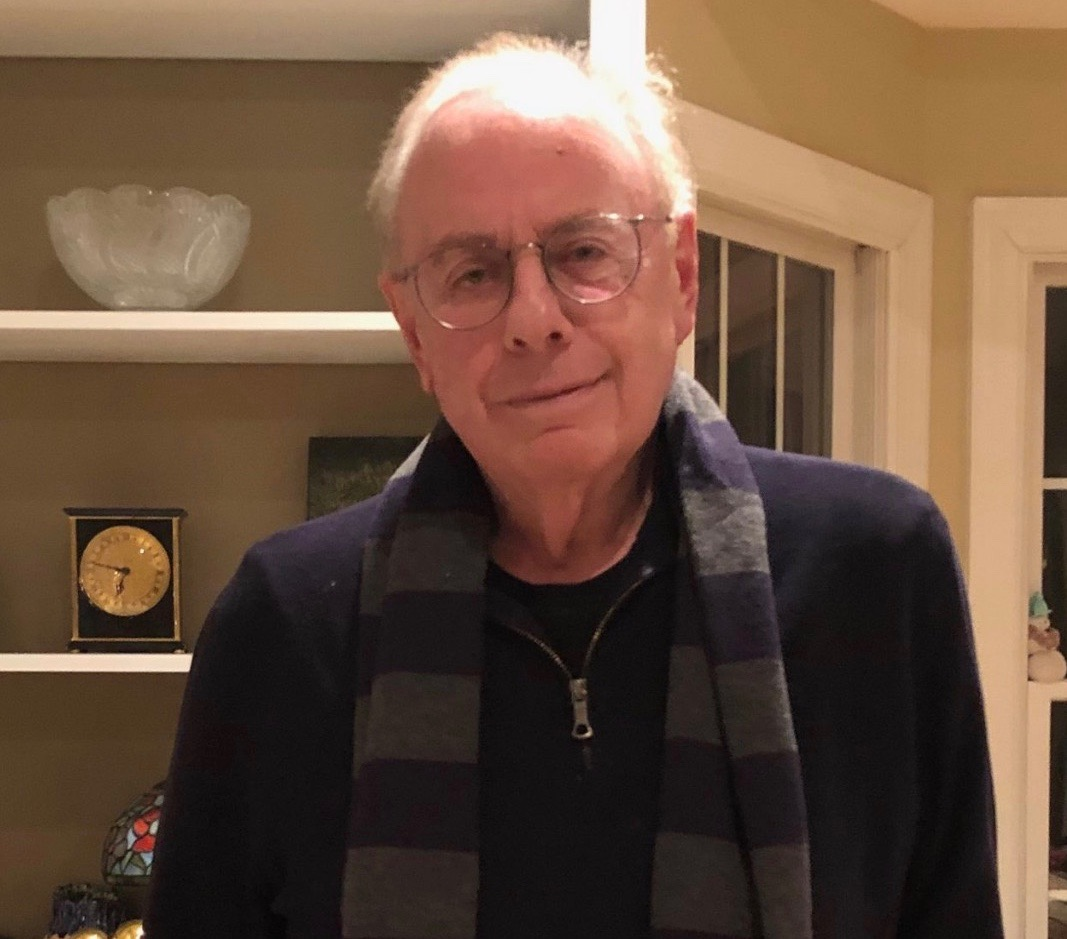
- Rosenblatt in 2019
- Born: September 13, 1940 (age 86); New York City, U.S.
- Education: New York University (AB); Harvard University (AM, PhD)
- Occupations: Writer, teacher
- Spouse: Virginia Rosenblatt
- Children: Carl, Amy, John

Roger Rosenblatt (born September 13, 1940) is an American memoirist, essayist, novelist, and playwright. He was a long-time essayist for Time magazine and PBS NewsHour.

== Early life and education ==
Rosenblatt was born in New York City on September 13, 1940, to Milton B. Rosenblatt, a physician, and Mollie (née Spruch) Rosenblatt, a teacher. He grew up with his parents and a younger brother in an apartment overlooking Gramercy Park in Manhattan. He later wrote about his childhood there in the memoir The Boy Detective: A New York Childhood (2013).

He graduated with honors from New York University with an A.B. in 1962, then earned an A.M. from Harvard University in 1963 and a Ph.D. there in 1968.

== Personal life ==
Rosenblatt married Virginia "Ginny" Jones, a teacher, on June 15, 1963. They have three children: Carl, Amy, and John. On December 8, 2007, their daughter Amy Rosenblatt Solomon, a 38-year-old pediatrician and mother of three, died suddenly of an undiagnosed heart condition at her home in Bethesda, Maryland. Rosenblatt and his wife moved into their son-in-law's home to help raise the three grandchildren, while Rosenblatt kept commuting to teach at Stony Brook University. He first wrote about this period in an essay for The New Yorker, and later in the memoirs Making Toast (2010) and Kayak Morning (2012). The Rosenblatts live in Quogue, New York.

== Career ==
Rosenblatt began writing professionally in his mid-30s, when he became literary editor and a columnist for The New Republic. Before that, he taught at Harvard, where he earned his Ph.D. In 1965–66 he was a Fulbright Scholar in Ireland, where he played on the Irish international basketball team. At age 25, he became the director of Harvard's freshman writing program. At age 28, he held the Briggs–Copeland appointment in the teaching of writing, and was Allston–Burr Senior Tutor, and later, Master of Dunster House. At age 29 Rosenblatt was the youngest House Master in Harvard's history. He was a candidate for the presidency of Harvard, but the position ultimately went to Harvard Law School dean Derek Bok.

At Harvard, in addition to creative writing, Rosenblatt taught Irish drama, modern poetry, and the university's first course in African-American literature. In 2005 he was the Edward R. Murrow visiting professor at Harvard. In 2010 he was selected for the Robert Foster Cherry Award as one of the three most gifted university teachers in the country.

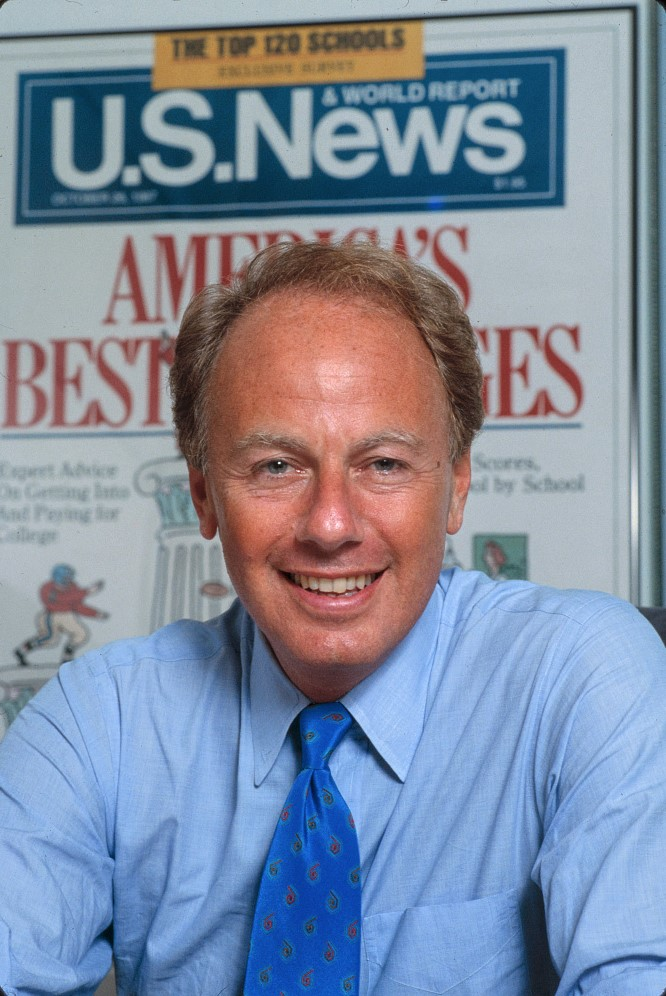
Rosenblatt in 1988, in front of U.S. News & World Report "America's Best Colleges" issue

In 1975 Rosenblatt became Literary Editor and a columnist at The New Republic. After that, and before turning solely to literary work, he was a columnist for The Washington Post (during which time Washingtonian Magazine named him Best Columnist in Washington), and an essayist for the NewsHour on PBS. In 1979, Rosenblatt became an essayist for Time magazine, a post that he held on and off until 2006. He continued to do TV essays for the NewsHour until that same year. His essays for Time won two George Polk Awards, awards from the Overseas Press Club, the American Bar Association, and others. His NewsHour essays won the Peabody Award and the Emmy. Rosenblatt's Time cover essay, "A Letter to the Year 2086" was chosen for the time capsule placed inside the Statue of Liberty at its centennial. In 1985, he was on the short list for NASA's Journalist in Space before the program was ended by the Challenger shuttle tragedy. He argued in a 1999 article for Time that guns should be banned.

As Senior Writer at Time Rosenblatt became the first to report his own stories—the functions of reporting and writing having been separate previously. "Here you had a superstar writer becoming a superstar reporter," wrote executive editor Jason McManus. Under managing editor Ray Cave, Rosenblatt also wrote the magazine's first "tone poems," brief interpretive essays introducing cover stories.

Rosenblatt's essay "The Man in the Water," about the self-sacrificing hero of the Air Florida airliner crash in 1981, was read by President Reagan at a ceremony honoring the man. His other prominent pieces included cover stories on the 40th anniversary of the atomic bombing of Hiroshima, on the Los Angeles Olympics, on a family services organization in Brooklyn, and the essay accompanying the photographs in "A Day in the Life of the Soviet Union." Rosenblatt's 25,000-word "Children of War," on the thoughts and lives of children in the war zones of Northern Ireland, Israel, Lebanon, Cambodia, and Vietnam was deemed "one of the most poignant stories Time ever published", and was noted worldwide. Later, he wrote about wars in Sudan (for Vanity Fair), and Rwanda (for the New York Times Magazine).

In 2006 Rosenblatt left his positions at Time and the NewsHour and gave up journalism to devote his time to the writing of memoirs, novels and extended essays. His first novel, Lapham Rising, was a national bestseller, adapted as Angry Neighbors (2022) and filmed around Waseca, Minnesota and Excelsior, Minnesota. Making Toast was a New York Times bestseller. The memoir was a book-length version of an essay he wrote for the New Yorker magazine, on the death of his daughter, in 2008. The L.A. Times called Making Toast "sad, funny, brave and luminous. A rare and generous book." The Washington Post described it as "a textbook on what constitutes perfect writing and how to be a class act." He followed Making Toast with Unless It Moves the Human Heart, a book on the art and craft of writing, which was also a New York Times bestseller, as was Kayak Morning, a meditation on grief. The Boy Detective: A New York Childhood was published in 2013. The Book of Love: Improvisations on That Crazy Little Thing was published in January 2015. His novel, Thomas Murphy, was published in January, 2016. His two most recent books are Cold Moon: On Life, Love, and Responsibility (2020) and Cataract Blues: Running the Keyboard (2023).

Of Cold Moon, The Washington Post wrote: "In this deceptively short book, the celebrated author and essayist takes us on a tour of his 'weathered mind.' His memories of his life summon ours, without warning or apology. Line by line, he helps us find softer landings... He never mentions [the pandemic], and yet he does... 'Everybody grieves.' So many lost, with many more to die... Let us abide by Rosenblatt's No. 3. We are responsible for each other." Kirkus Reviews wrote: "In brief passages connected by associations and the improvisational feel of jazz [Rosenblatt] moves fluidly among memoir, philosophy, natural history and inspiration... A tonic for tough times filled with plain spoken lyricism, gratitude, and good humor."

Of Cataract Blues, Garry Trudeau wrote: "While everyone around you is seeing red, along comes a happy outpatient who's just nuts about the color blue. Prompted by his wildly successful eye surgery, Roger Rosenblatt celebrates his new favorite wavelength by letting it wash over everything that matters — nature, history, music, memory, laughter, loss, and love. This is a master, at work and at play."

In total, he is the author of 22 books, which have been published in 15 languages. They include the national bestseller Rules for Aging; three collections of essays; and Children of War, based on his story in Time, which won the Robert F. Kennedy Book Prize and was a finalist for the National Book Critics Circle Award.

He has also written six off-Broadway plays, including Ashley Montana Goes Ashore in the Caicos, and The Oldsmobiles, both produced at the Flea Theater. His comic one-man show, Free Speech in America, which he performed at the American Place Theater, was cited by the New York Times as one of the 10 best plays of 1991. His most recent play, performed at the Bay Street Theater in Sag Harbor (2019), was “Lives in the Basement, Does Nothing,” a musical monologue on the art of writing, for which he sang and played piano.

William Safire of the New York Times wrote that Roger Rosenblatt’s work represents “some of the most profound and stylish writing in America today.” Vanity Fair said that he “set new standards of thought and compassion” in journalism. The Philadelphia Inquirer cited his essays for “unparalleled elegance and wit.” Kirkus Reviews noted, "He has excelled in nearly every literary form." UPI (United Press International) called him “a national treasure.”

In his recent books, Rosenblatt has experimented with a form of narrative that connects section to section, without chapter demarcations, dismissing chronological time, and mixing fact and fiction. The effect he seeks is akin to movements in music. In his review of The Boy Detective in the New York Times Book Review, Pete Hamill compared Rosenblatt's style to that of "a great jazz musician...moving from one emotion to another, playing some with a dose of irony, others with joy, and a few with pain and melancholy (the blues, of course). Alone with the instrument of his art, he seems to be hoping only to surprise himself." The Kirkus Review of The Book of Love said, "His wanderings with the subject of love are like Coltrane at the Village Vanguard. When you hear it, you know."

In November, 2015, Rosenblatt received the 2015 Kenyon Review Award for Literary Achievement. In June, 2016, he was awarded the President's Medal of the Chautauqua Institution for the artistic and moral quality of his body of work. In April, 2023, he received a Guggenheim Fellowship. In June, 2023, he received the NYU College of Arts and Science Alumni Achievement Award. Seven universities have awarded him honorary doctorates.

In 2018, he launched a podcast: Word for Word with Roger Rosenblatt. In 2021, he was honored by the Fulbright Association on its 75th anniversary. Also in 2021, he founded Write America, a national reading series broadcast weekly by writers devoted to healing divisions in the country.

His papers are kept in the Chalmers Library at Kenyon College.

== Works ==
- Black Fiction (1974)
- Children of War (1983)
- Witness: The World Since Hiroshima (1985)
- Life Itself: Abortion in the American Mind (1992)
- The Man In The Water (1994)
- Coming Apart: A Memoir of the Harvard Wars of 1969 (1997)
- Consuming Desires: Consumption, Culture and the Pursuit of Happiness (1999)
- Rules for Aging (2000)
- Where We Stand: 30 Reasons for Loving Our Country (2002)
- Anything Can Happen (2004)
- Lapham Rising (2006)
- Beet (2008)
- Making Toast (2010)
- Unless it Moves the Human Heart: The Art and Craft of Writing (2011)
- Kayak Morning (2012)
- The Boy Detective: A New York Childhood (2013)
- The Book of Love (2015)
- Thomas Murphy (2016)
- The Story I Am (2020)
- Cold Moon (2020)
- Cataract Blues (2023)
- A Steinway on the Beach (2024)
- More Rules for Aging (2026)
