= Jens Erik Gould =

American journalist (born 1981)

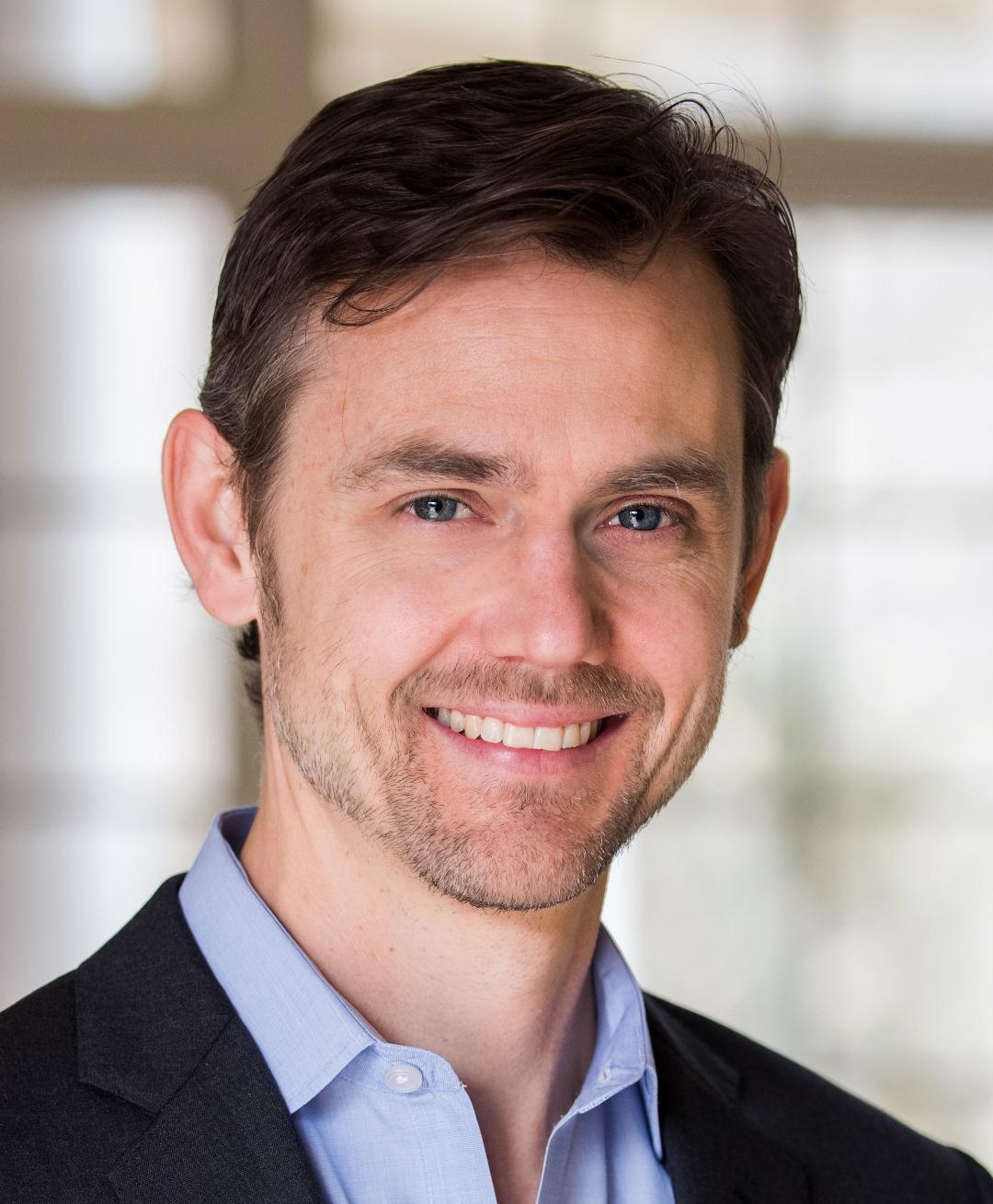
- Jens Erik Gould, American Journalist
- Born: January 17, 1981 (age 45); Santa Monica, California
- Education: University of Michigan
- Occupation: Journalist
- Organization(s): Time; Bloomberg News; Santa Fe New Mexican
- Website: jenserikgould.com

Jens Erik Gould (born 1981) is an American journalist focusing on politics, business and energy. He has reported for media outlets including The New York Times, National Public Radio, Bloomberg News, and TIME Magazine. He has also worked as a musician and video producer.

== Career ==
Gould worked as a foreign correspondent in Venezuela from 2005 to 2008. During this time, he regularly contributed pieces on the Hugo Chavez administration to The New York Times' Business Day, TIME Magazine, and National Public Radio, as well as pieces on the Venezuelan and global oil industry for Argus Media and Platts. From 2008 to 2011, Gould worked as a staff correspondent for Bloomberg News in Mexico City, covering Mexican politics, economy and the drug war. His work on Latin America has been cited in several Congressional Research Service reports for the US Congress.

Gould moved to Los Angeles in 2011. He has covered California politics and entertainment news for TIME Magazine and time.com. He has also received criticism for his TIME article on redevelopment in downtown Los Angeles.

Gould produced the video documentary web series Bravery Tapes, focusing on inspiring human interest stories. The episode "Eric & Juan: A Crossroad of Gay Marriage and Immigration” was widely cited in the lead-up to the 2013 resumption of same-sex marriage in California, receiving praise from the NGO GLAAD.

Most recently, Gould worked as a reporter for the Santa Fe New Mexican from June 2019 to November 2020.

== Awards ==
Gould received a Fulbright scholarship to teach at the University of Ghent, Belgium, in 2002–03. He has also received two Pulitzer Center grants to report on the HIV crisis in Honduras and tuberculosis testing in Vietnam. In 2013, Gould received a José Martí Publishing Award for Outstanding Community Service/Health Article from The National Association of Hispanic Publications.

Gould won seven awards in the Society of Professional Journalists’ 2020 Top of the Rockies contest. His SPJ awards included first place in the "Business: Enterprise Reporting" category for articles on the Permian Basin oil boom, first place in the "Feature: Long Form" category for "A Border on the Edge", first place in the "General Reporting Series or Package" category for "Behind the Wall", and first place in "Politics: General Reporting" category for "Lujan Grisham and her inner circle".

Gould won a first place award for Best Series in the 2020 New Mexico Press Association contest for his series “Behind the Wall” on U.S. immigration policy. NMPA wrote, “In an extremely competitive category, this series stood out for its deeply sourced, boots-on-the-ground coverage of a complex topic."
