= Alex Rozier =

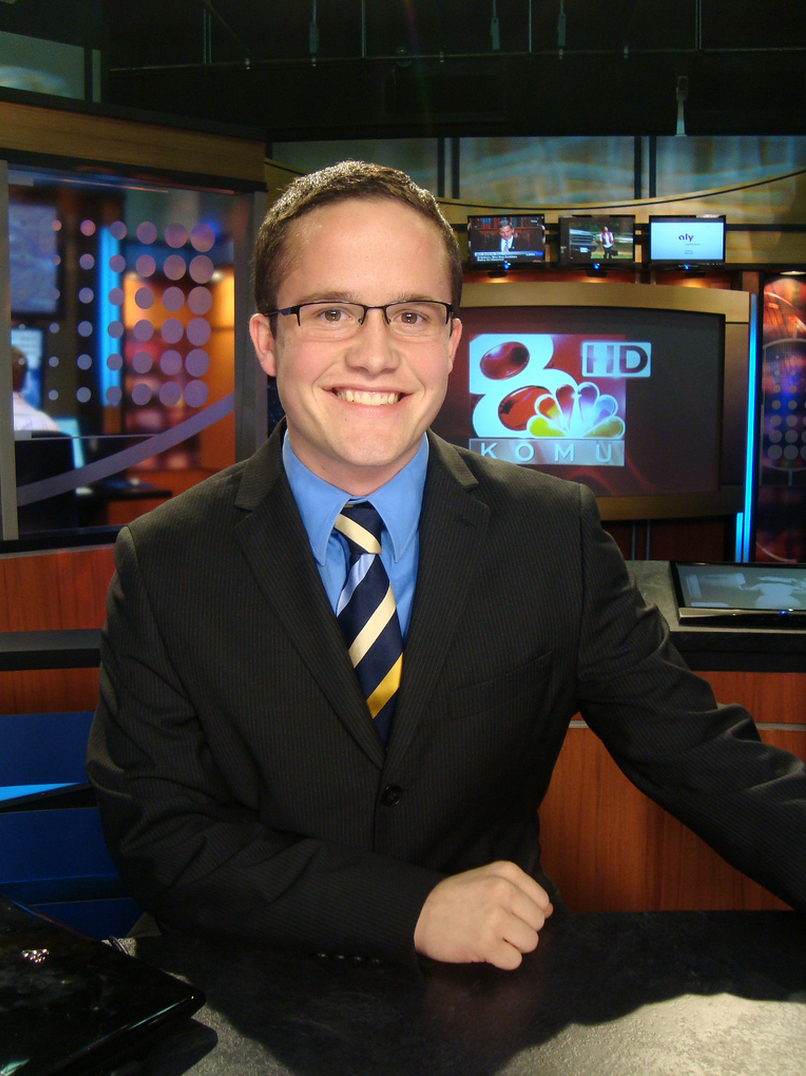
- Rozier at KOMU-TV in December 2009
- Born: Virginia, Minnesota, U.S.
- Education: Missouri School of Journalism
- Occupation: Journalist
- Notable credit(s): KOMU-TV reporter/anchor (2007–2011); KHQ-TV reporter/anchor (2011–2014); KING-TV reporter (2014–2019); WFAA reporter (2019–2022); KNBC reporter (2022–present)

Alex Rozier is an American journalist, who works as a reporter for NBC 4 in Los Angeles.

== Early life and education ==
When Rozier was four years old, he avidly watched nightly newscasts in his home state of Minnesota. For his birthday that year, he asked to meet his idol: KMSP-TV news anchor Robyne Robinson, who agreed to meet him after his parents drove almost five hours to get to the news station. Rozier attended Virginia High School in Virginia, Minnesota, where he was involved with student council, National Honor Society, Key Club, the student newspaper, and choir. In his senior year of high school, he was selected as a delegate to represent Minnesota at the American Legion Boys Nation event, where he got to see President George W. Bush.

In 2007, while a freshman at the Missouri School of Journalism, he joined KOMU-TV in Columbia, Missouri, as a reporter; he later became an anchor as well. In 2010, Rozier was one of five winners of the Pulitzer Center YouTube Project: Report international competition with his reporting project Guatemala: The Culture that Crawls. He graduated from the Missouri School of Journalism in 2011 with a bachelor's degree in radio-television journalism, where he was the master of ceremonies.

== Career ==
After college, Rozier joined KHQ-TV in Spokane, Washington, in May 2011 as a weekday reporter and weekend anchor. His feature report, called The Eyes of a Hero, aired on Veterans Day in 2012 and focused on a local artist who drew portraits of fallen soldiers for their families. In 2013, Rozier won a National Edward R. Murrow Award for his reporting on the story, earning KHQ their first ever national award in company history. The story also earned an Emmy Award nomination for "Feature News Report - Serious Feature" at the Northwest Emmy Awards in 2013. On September 15, 2013, KHQ aired his feature report on two brothers who climbed Sloan Peak 40 years after their father vanished from the same mountain, called The Climb for Closure. In 2014, the story was nominated for two Emmy Awards at the 2014 Northwest Emmy Awards and won a national award from the Society of Professional Journalists.

On May 28, 2014, Rozier announced on Twitter that he was leaving KHQ to report at KING-TV in Seattle.
On March 13, 2019, Rozier announced on Twitter that he was leaving KING 5 to report at WFAA in Dallas.
On March 14, 2022, Rozier announced on Twitter that he was leaving WFAA to report at KNBC in Los Angeles.
