= Henry W. Luce =

American missionary (1868–1941)

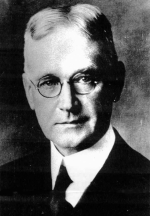
- Born: Henry Winters Luce; June 24, 1868; Scranton, Pennsylvania, U.S.
- Died: December 7, 1941 (aged 73); Haverford, Pennsylvania, U.S.
- Education: Yale University
- Occupation: Christian Missionary
- Children: 4, including Henry Luce

Henry Winters Luce (June 24, 1868 – December 7, 1941) was an American missionary and educator in China. He was the father of magazine publisher Henry Luce.

== Biography ==
Born on June 24, 1868, in Scranton, Pennsylvania, Luce graduated from Yale University in 1892. After graduation, he stayed at Union Seminary in New York for two years, before his seminary training at Princeton Theological Seminary, in 1896.

In 1897, Luce married Elizabeth Root, was ordained, and sent to China by the Presbyterian Board of Foreign Missions. In total, he spent 31 years in the country with Elizabeth, where their four children were born, Henry, Emmavail, Elisabeth, and Sheldon.

Luce was a professor at Cheeloo University in Jinan, China, where he led fundraising efforts and served as vice president for a short time. He also helped to initiate the Yale-in-China Association. In 1928, he accepted a professorship at the Kennedy School of Missions in Hartford, Connecticut. He held this position until his retirement in 1935. He died on December 7, 1941, in Haverford, Pennsylvania.

== Honors ==
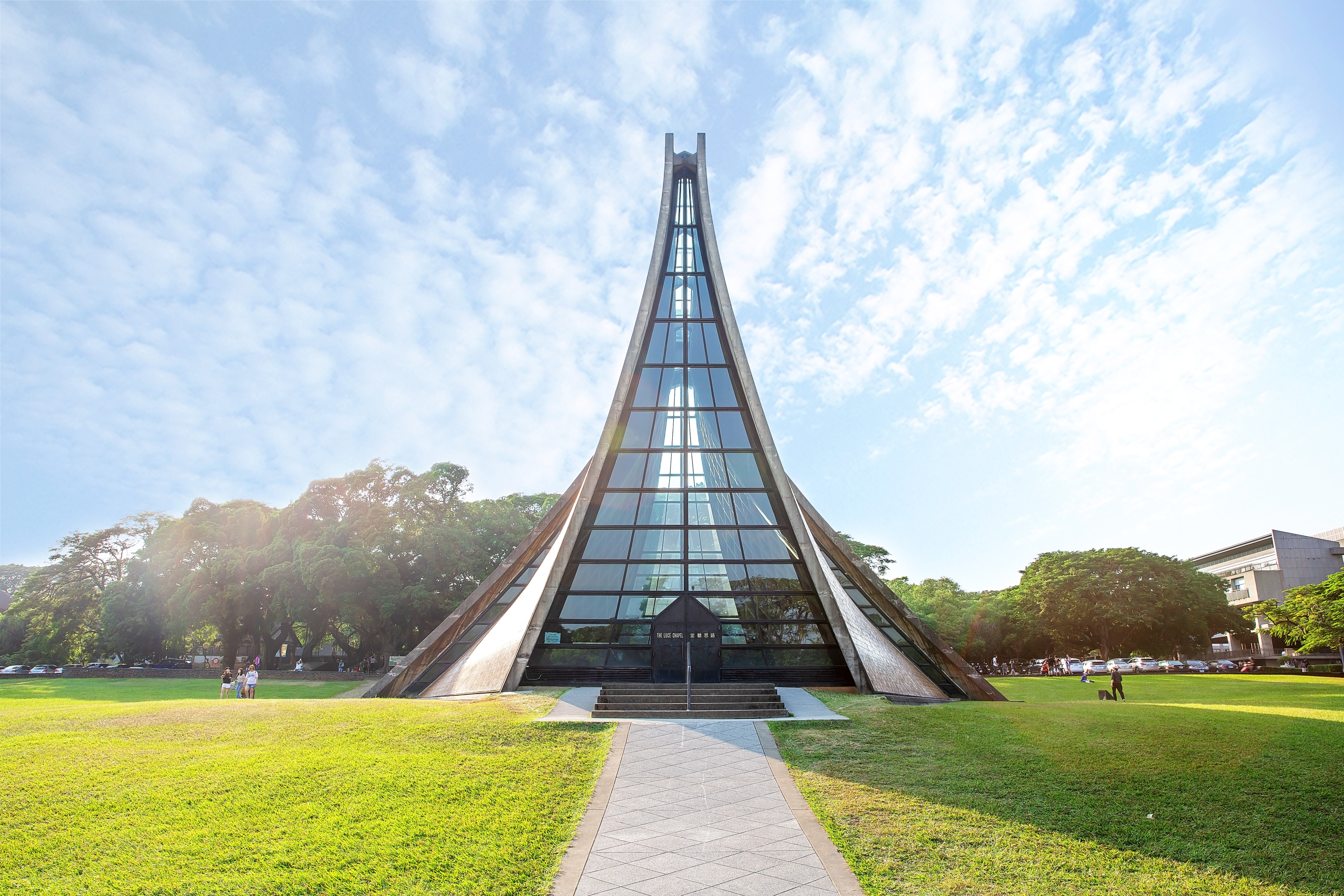
Luce Memorial Chapel was named in honor of the Rev. Henry W. Luce

One of Luce's sons, Henry R. Luce, established a grant-making foundation as a tribute to his parents.

The Luce Memorial Chapel, designed by I. M. Pei and situated on the campus of Tunghai University in Taichung, Taiwan, is named after Henry W. Luce. Construction of the chapel was sponsored by his son Henry R. Luce.
