= Pulitzer Center =

Nonprofit news media organization

Pulitzer Center on Crisis Reporting
- Named after: Joseph Pulitzer
- Formation: 2006
- Type: News media organization
- Tax ID no.: 27-0458242
- Headquarters: Washington, D.C.
- Affiliations: Institute for Nonprofit News (member)

The Pulitzer Center on Crisis Reporting is an American news media organization established in 2006 that sponsors independent reporting on global issues that other media outlets are less willing or able to undertake on their own. The center's goal is to raise the standard of coverage of international systemic crises and to do so in a way that engages both the broad public and government policy-makers. The organization is based in Washington, D.C.

The Center funds international travel costs associated with reporting projects on topics and regions of global importance. Grant amounts for journalists depend on the project and range from $3,000 to $20,000. All journalists, writers, or filmmakers, both freelance and staff of any nationality, may apply. It also brings journalists to schools, colleges, and universities around the United States to engage students with global issues. In 2015, it launched an online lesson builder that lets educators use Pulitzer Center journalism in original lessons.

The Pulitzer Center is recognized as a tax-exempt organization under Section 501(c)(3) of the Internal Revenue Code. It is not affiliated with the Pulitzer Prizes.

== Pulitzer Center reporting projects ==
The Pulitzer Center has sponsored reporting projects on a wide variety of under-reported stories across the globe. The projects incorporate blog posts, multimedia reporting, and multiple pieces that run in major mainstream news outlets such as the St. Louis Post-Dispatch, The Guardian, Financial Times, PBS Newshour, Seattle Times, The New Yorker, The New York Times and the Los Angeles Times. The Pulitzer Center treats the reporting projects as full-blown campaigns, designed to create maximum exposure for the reporting. This entails promoting the projects through social media, partnerships with other websites and organizations, and lectures by the journalists themselves at universities and schools.

Pulitzer Center-funded projects have won nearly every journalism award available including the Pulitzer Prize, George C. Polk Award, Peabody Award, Emmy Award, Associated Press Media Editors, the National Academy of Sciences, CINE Golden Eagle Award, Loeb and Society of Professional Journalists.

Documentaries funded by the Center have been screened at the Sundance Film Festival, at the United Nations, and at government office buildings and more. The film The Abominable Crime, about homosexuality in Jamaica, won Best Feature Length Documentary at the Belize International Film Festival. "No Fire Zone", a film by grantee Callum Macrae about government killing of Tamil citizens in the last days of the Sri Lankan civil war, has been garnering attention around the world—even from Prime Minister David Cameron.

Starting in 2018, the Pulitzer Center began providing support for the Associated Press' ongoing coverage of the Yemen civil war. On April 15, 2019, the AP Yemen team—including Maggie Michael, Maad al-Zekri, and Nariman El-Mofty—was awarded the Pulitzer Prize for International Reporting for "a revelatory yearlong series detailing the atrocities of the war in Yemen, including theft of food aid, deployment of child soldiers and torture of prisoners."

The Pulitzer Center received the 2009 National Press Foundation Excellence in Online Journalism Award. In September 2009 the Pulitzer Center's multimedia website LiveHopeLove.com won an Emmy Award for new approaches to news and documentary programming, in the arts, lifestyle and culture category. LiveHopeLove.com also won the 2009 Webby Award People's Voice Award for the Art category, was a finalist in the Best Use of Photography category, and was an Official Honoree in the Best Visual Design - Aesthetic category. The site incorporated the poetry of Kwame Dawes and photography of Joshua Cogan. People interviewed by Dawes for the website are inspirations for his poems, and the audience can meet them through photographs and videos on the LiveHopeLove.com.

In 2009, Michael Kavanagh's Pulitzer Center project "War in Congo" for Worldfocus was nominated for a News and Documentary Emmy Award, and won an Edward R. Murrow Award for radio writing.

Pulitzer Center coverage of post-earthquake Haiti won the 2011 National Press Club Joan Friedenberg Award for Online Journalism, along with msnbc.com.

Associated Press's series, Tracked, is supported by the Pulitzer Center on Crisis Reporting, and reports the effects on people of algorithm-driven decisions, such as Fog Reveal, by Fog Data Science LLC, Leesburg, Virginia.

== Journalism Lab ==
The Pulitzer Center bridges traditional and new media to engage the public in as many ways as possible – from print and broadcast outlets to face-to-face community discussion and interactive web-based technology. In 2013, the Pulitzer Center contributed funding to multimedia long-form pieces which take advantage of HTML5 and responsive design advances: The Seattle Times', and the Financial Times' Austerity Audit series.

The Pulitzer Center is also at the forefront of interactive e-book design and has won awards and accolades from Picture of the Year International, National Press Photographers Association, the Webbys, Kirkus Reviews, and more. They use two free platforms for production—iBooks Author and Creatavist.

In December 2007, YouTube editors put the Pulitzer Center at the top of their "News and Politics" page and praised its videos as "some of the most moving journalism you'll find on this site."

== Board of directors ==
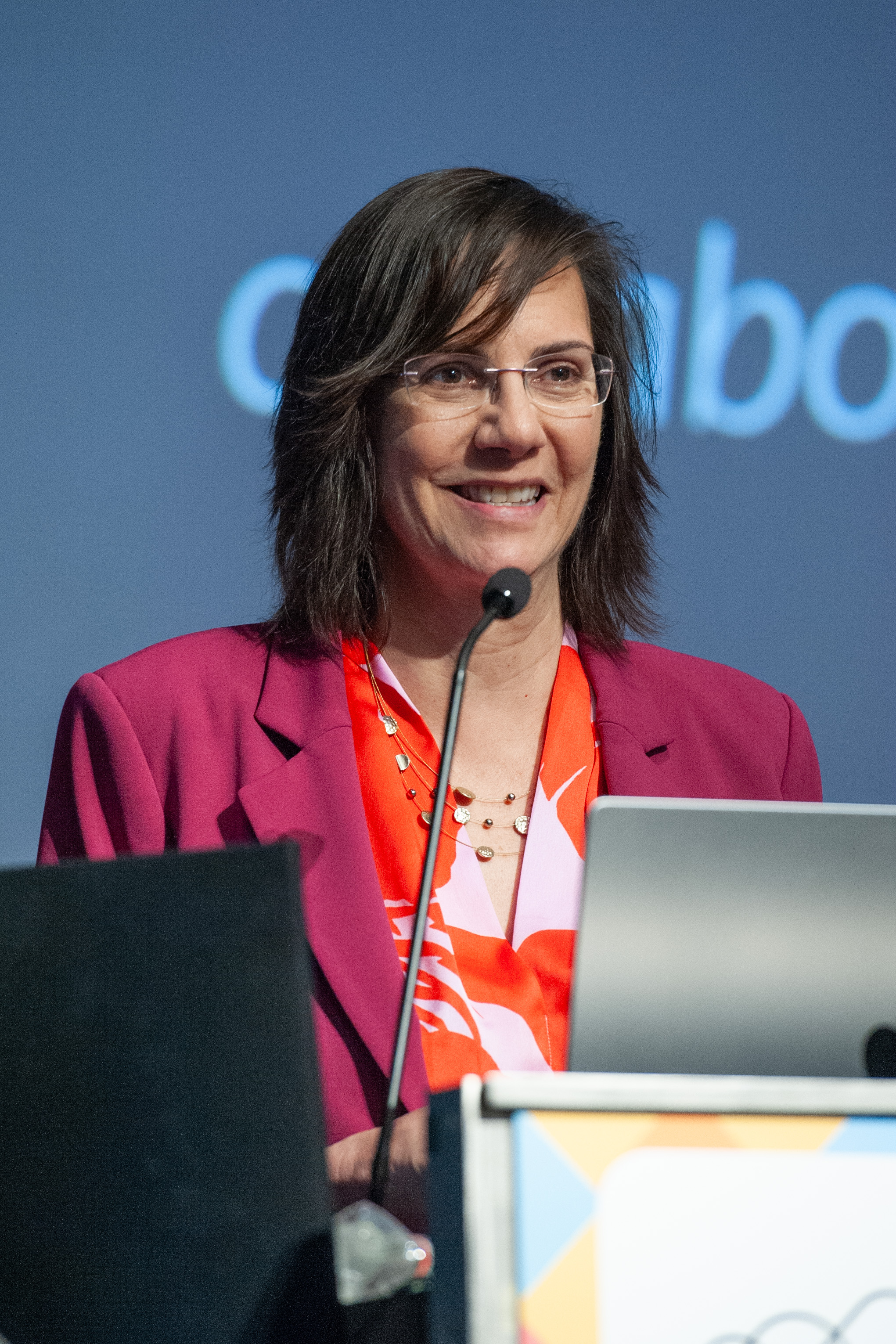
Lisa Gibbs, the CEO of the Pulitzer Center

- Emily Rauh Pulitzer, St. Louis, MO, President – Chair and founder, Pulitzer Arts Foundation
- William Bush, Chicago, IL – Partner and General Counsel, BDT Capital Partners
- Betsy Dietel, Flint Hill, VA - Senior Partner, Dietel Partners
- Sam Dolnick, New York, NY - Assistant Managing Editor of The New York Times
- Betsy Karel, Washington, DC
- Joel Motley, Scarborough, NY - Managing Director, Public Capital Advisors LLC
- Richard W. Moore, Brooklyn, NY - Counsel, Day Pitney, LLP
- Joseph Pulitzer V, Cincinnati, OH
- David Rohde, New York, NY - Investigative Reporter, Thomson Reuters
- Jon Sawyer, Washington, DC – Executive Director, Pulitzer Center on Crisis Reporting
- Linda Winslow, Washington, DC – Executive Producer, PBS NewsHour

== Diversity, Equity, and Inclusion Policy ==
As reported by NiemanLab in May 2020, the Pulitzer Center released a wide-ranging Diversity, Equity, and Inclusion statement that committed to "deliberately seek to support" reporting projects, newsrooms, journalists, and education partners that reflect the diversity of their audiences. "The Pulitzer Center acknowledges that there are societal structures that uplift and empower certain groups based on their intersecting identities and experiences, while at the same time marginalizing and erasing others; we acknowledge that these inequities were developed over time and have continuing, lasting impact."

== Coronavirus News Collaboration Challenge ==
In 2020, the Pulitzer Center launched the Coronavirus News Collaboration Challenge in response to the COVID-19 pandemic, seeking journalism grant proposals that "develop innovative approaches to reporting on the novel coronavirus crisis using collaboration among journalists and newsrooms across state lines or national borders." The journal Science received funding from the Pulitzer Center for their COVID-19-related coverage.

== Reporting on Trump Administration's 2017 Yemen Raid ==
In 2017, the Pulitzer Center funded freelance journalist Iona Craig's reporting on the aftermath of the Trump administration's failed special forces raid on al-Qaeda militants in the Yemeni village of al Ghayil. Craig's story, "Death in Al Ghayil" was published by The Intercept and focused on the families of civilians killed in the U.S. military operation.

In regards to the Pulitzer Center's support, Craig told James Warren of the Poynter Institute: "I would never have gone back for this latest trip if it wasn't for the grant from the Pulitzer Center. That grant, combined with my experience in Yemen — garnered from working as a freelancer in a country that has never had resident staff correspondents based there — meant I was able to cover a story that probably no other non-Yemeni journalist could."

== YouTube Project: Report ==
In 2008, the Pulitzer Center and YouTube sponsored Project: Report, a video contest for non-professional journalists. The grand prize winner of the contest, Arturo Perez, received a $10,000 grant for an international reporting project, which he used to travel to Jerusalem and produce a video on dialogue between Palestinian and Israeli youth.

In 2010, the Pulitzer Center and YouTube again teamed up for Project: Report, this time selecting five winners of the grand prize who each received $10,000 grants for international reporting projects. The winners were Samantha Danis, Paul Franz, Elan Gepner, Mark Jeevaratnam, and Alex Rozier.

== Detention and Uganda photo ==
Following the June 2009 presidential election in Iran, Pulitzer Center-commissioned journalist Iason Athanasiadis was detained for three weeks in Tehran's Evin Prison. Covering the elections as a freelance reporter for The Washington Times, Athanasiadis was commissioned to report on the elections as part of the Pulitzer Center's goal to "fill in large media gaps." Following his release, Athanasiadis continued to report on the opposition movement in Iran and its activities, despite the risks that it entailed.

In April 2010, the Pulitzer Center came under fire after a grantee and World Press Photo winner, Marco Vernaschi, was accused of requesting that a Ugandan mother exhume her recently deceased child, offering payment after the fact. The allegations were revealed publicly when Brazilian-Norwegian photographer André Liohn traveled to Uganda to report the same story and uncovered evidence to suggest, contrary to a vague photo caption written by Vernaschi, that he was not present at the time of burial and had in essence staged a photo and offered payment in return. After notifying the Pulitzer Center and the photojournalist Anne Holmes, who subsequently removed an interview with Vernaschi that had previously been on her blog, Liohn went public on the journalists' forum Lightstalkers. The story drew more attention when Roy Greenslade wrote it up in The Guardian. As of October 2011, the Pulitzer Center remains firmly behind Vernaschi's work, although it has withdrawn several images from this and another story (where questions were raised about the ethics of showing the face and genitalia of a child who had suffered genital mutilation) and hosted a debate and discussion about the photographer's working methods, journalistic integrity, and professional ethics.

== Grant Recipients ==
- Alex Rozier
- Bénédicte Kurzen
- Ben Taub
- Carlos Javier Ortiz
- Carolyn Drake
- Danny Gold
- Deena Guzder
- Jens Erik Gould
- Jonathan Kaiman
- Loretta Tofani
- Micah Albert
- Peter van Agtmael
- Roberto Lovato
- Xyza Cruz Bacani
- Michael Scott Moore
- Kenneth R. Rosen
- Susan Schulman
