= Danny Gold (journalist) =

American journalist and documentary filmmaker

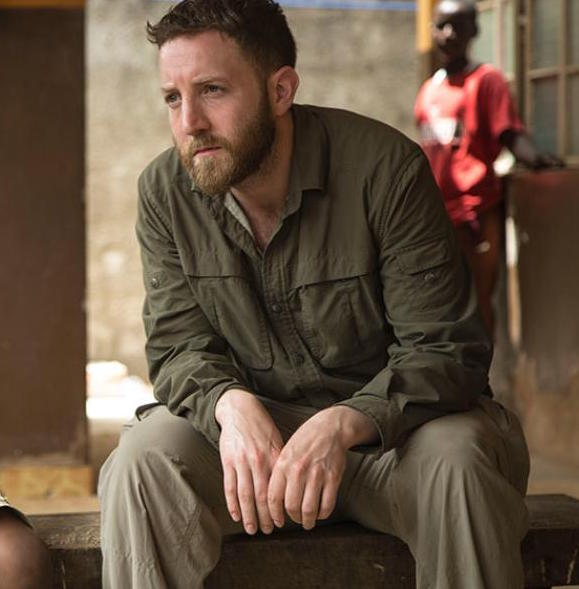
- Danny Gold reporting for Vice News
- Born: New York City
- Education: Tufts University, CUNY Graduate School of Journalism
- Occupation: Journalist

Danny Gold is an American journalist and documentary filmmaker. He is a 2018 Pulitzer Center grantee for reporting on gangs in El Salvador. Gold has produced documentaries and worked as a correspondent for PBS Newshour, AJ+, The Guardian, Fusion TV, HBO, and others. Gold was a founding producer and host for Vice News, and has written featured stories for The Wall Street Journal, Esquire, and The New York Times, among others. He focuses on organized crime, armed conflict, and crises.

== Personal life ==
Danny Gold was born in New York City. He attended White Plains High School. Gold graduated from Tufts University with a bachelor's degree in political science in 2005, and a master's degree in Journalism from the CUNY Graduate School of Journalism in 2010. Gold has written that all four of his grandparents are Holocaust survivors and that two grandparents were the only surviving members of their families.

== Early career ==
Gold was a stringer for the New York Post from 2011 to 2012. In 2012, Gold began reporting for The Wall Street Journal. His coverage focused on New York City crime and breaking news. Gold covered the Boston Marathon bombing on April 15, 2013 and the Sandy Hook Elementary School shooting for The Wall Street Journal and reported from Myanmar for NBC News.

== Conflict reporting ==
=== Syria ===
During his first report from Syria during its civil war in 2012, Gold gained some of the earliest access to the People's Protection Units (YPG). In March 2013, during the Battle of Ras al-Ayn, Gold embedded with the Free Syrian Army's Mashaal Brigade.

Gold returned to Syria in 2015, where he was one of only a handful of journalists reporting directly from the besieged city of Kobane.

=== Gaza ===
In late 2013, Gold was hired at the newly created international news outlet, Vice News. As part of the original launch team, Gold was deployed to Gaza in 2014 to cover the Israel-Gaza conflict. During that deployment, a series of 9 video dispatches were released, focusing on both the violence and political implications of the conflict.

=== Iraq ===
Gold headed Vice's breaking news coverage of the 2014 attack on Mosul by the Islamic State of Iraq and the Levant. He spent time on the frontline in Mosul during the early stages, and later embedded with Kurdish militia forces in the northern city of Kirkuk. When ISIL began an assault on the Christian city of Qaraqosh, east of Mosul, Gold covered the Peshmerga's attempts to fortify the city against ISIL mortar attacks.

Gold returned to Mosul in 2016 as a freelancer to cover the U.S.-supported military operation to liberate the city from ISIL control. The offensive was considered a final test of President Barack Obama's military strategy in the Middle East, and was called a "disaster" by President Donald Trump. The report was released by Fusion TV.

=== Ebola ===
During the 2014 Ebola outbreak, Gold and a team from Vice News traveled to Monrovia, Liberia. He produced a half-hour special on the epidemic, speaking to doctors, aid workers, and victims. Gawker called the brashness of the report "terrifying". The film went on to win a 2015 Webby Award.

=== El Salvador ===
Gold began reporting from El Salvador in 2015, covering MS-13 and 18th Street gang activity, and government countermeasures. In 2018, he received a Pulitzer Center grant to investigate the effects of American deportation, as well as methods for escaping the cycle of gang violence.

== Awards ==
- 2012: Mirror Award Nominee
- 2013 Fellowship from the International Center for Journalists
- 2015: Webby People's Voice Award for Online Film & Video
- 2018: Pulitzer Center Reporting Grant
