= Briton Hadden =

American journalist and co-founder of Time magazine (1898–1929)

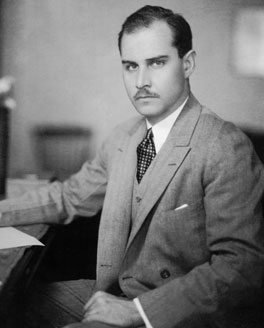
- Born: February 18, 1898; Brooklyn, New York, U.S.
- Died: February 27, 1929 (aged 31)
- Education: Yale University
- Known for: Founder of Time Magazine

Briton Hadden (February 18, 1898 – February 27, 1929) was the co-founder of Time magazine with his Yale classmate Henry Luce. He was Time's first editor and the inventor of its revolutionary writing style, known as Timestyle. Though he died at 31, he was considered one of the most influential journalists of the twenties, a master innovator and stylist, and an iconic figure of the Jazz Age.

== Early life ==
Born in Brooklyn, Hadden got his start in newspaper writing at Brooklyn's Poly Prep Country Day School, where he wrote for the school magazine, the Poly Prep, and distributed a hand-written, underground sheet to his classmates that was called The Daily Glonk. Moving to the Hotchkiss School, he wrote for the Hotchkiss Record, a weekly newspaper. After an intense competition, he was elected the chairman of the newspaper and Luce the assistant managing editor. Hadden then turned the Record from a weekly into a bi-weekly.

At Yale, Hadden was elected to the staff of the Yale Daily News and later served as the paper's chairman twice (1917-1918 and 1919–1920). Luce was the News' managing editor the second time. While at Yale, he was a brother of Delta Kappa Epsilon (Phi chapter) and a member of Skull and Bones. It was during a break from school, when Hadden and Luce traveled south to Camp Jackson, South Carolina, as ROTC officer candidates, that they began seriously discussing the idea of creating a magazine that would condense all the news of the week into a brief and easily readable "digest."

== Career ==
After receiving his bachelor's degree from Yale University in 1920, Hadden wrote for the New York World, where he was mentored by one of New York's most famous and accomplished newspaper editors, Herbert Bayard Swope. In late 1921, Hadden wrote to Luce, who had recently been let go by the Chicago Daily News, and suggested that they both go to work for the Baltimore News. In Baltimore, they spent their nights working on the idea of a news magazine, which, at first, they planned to call Facts.

=== Founding Time magazine ===
In 1923, Hadden and Luce co-founded Time magazine along with Robert Livingston Johnson and another Yale classmate. Hadden and Luce served alternating years as the company's president, but Hadden was the editor for four and a half of the magazine's first six years, and was considered the "presiding genius". Johnson served as the magazine's vice president and advertising director. In its earliest years the magazine was edited in an abandoned beer brewery, subsequently moving to Cleveland in 1925, and returning to New York in 1927. For the next year and several months, both Time and The New Yorker were edited at 25 W. 45th Street in Manhattan. Thus two of the major magazine editors of the 1920s—Briton Hadden and Harold Ross—worked in the same building.

== Death ==
Hadden died on February 27, 1929, at the age of 31. His cause of death is most likely due to streptococcus viridans, which had entered his bloodstream two months prior, causing sepsis and ultimately the failure of his heart. Before his death, Hadden signed a will, which left all of his stock in Time Inc. to his mother and forbade his family from selling those shares for 49 years. Within a year of Hadden's death, Luce formed a syndicate, which succeeded in gaining hold of Hadden's stock.

== Legacy ==
Luce took Hadden's name off the masthead of Time within two weeks of his death. In the next 38 years, he delivered more than 300 speeches around the world, mentioning Hadden four times. Luce acquired control of Hadden's papers, and he kept them at Time Inc., where no one outside the company was allowed to view the papers as long as Luce lived. Throughout his life, Luce repeatedly claimed credit for Hadden's ideas in public speeches and in Time magazine.

Luce presided over the growth of the Time-Life empire, and donated funds towards the construction of a building at 202 York Street in New Haven, Connecticut, that would eventually become the Yale Daily News' new home. The office is today called the Briton Hadden Memorial Building.
