= Loretta Tofani =

American journalist

Loretta Tofani (born February 5, 1953) is a Pulitzer Prize-winning American journalist.

== Life ==
Tofani was born in New York City. She earned a bachelor's degree from Fordham University in 1975 where she served as editor-in-chief of the university newspaper, The Ram. She earned a master's degree in journalism from the University of California, Berkeley. She received a Fulbright fellowship to Japan in 1983. She served as a judge for a number of journalism awards.

In 1982, while a staff writer at The Washington Post, she wrote a series of articles about a pattern of widespread gang rape inside a Prince George's County Maryland jail, for which she won a 1982 Sigma Delta Chi Award for outstanding contributions to journalism and research, and 1983 Pulitzer Prize for Investigative Reporting. The series was notable for its documentation: Tofani obtained the victims' medical records and interviewed the victims as well as the rapists. The victims were innocent, charged with drunk driving and shoplifting, in jail because they did not have enough money for bond. The jail placed them in the same cellblocks with convicted murderers and armed robbers, who raped them. The jail changed its policies as a result of her story.

After nine years at The Washington Post, Tofani in 1987 became a reporter for The Philadelphia Inquirer, serving as the paper's Beijing Bureau Chief from 1992 through 1996. She wrote for the Inquirer for 14 years. She won other national awards at The Philadelphia Inquirer, and was a finalist for another Pulitzer Prize.

As a freelancer in 2007, Tofani reported and wrote the newspaper series "American Imports, Chinese Deaths". The six stories showed that millions of Chinese factory workers were getting fatal diseases and limb amputations while making thousands of products for the U.S. She argues that Chinese workers have been paying the real price of America's cheap goods.

The series was published in The Salt Lake Tribune. Tofani reported the series by making five trips to China with small travel grants provided by the Pulitzer Center on Crisis Reporting and the Center for Investigative Reporting's Dick Goldensohn Fund.

== Awards ==
- Sigma Delta Chi Award, Distinguished Service Award for outstanding contributions to journalism and research, 1982.
- Pulitzer Prize, 1983, local investigative reporting.
- Investigative Reporters and Editors award, 1983 and 2008.
- Society of Professional Journalists' award for investigative reporting, 1983 and 2008.
- Michael Kelly Award from the Atlantic Media Company, 2008.
- Special citation from the International Consortium of Investigative Journalists, 2008.
- Daniel Pearl Award for Outstanding International Investigative Reporting, 2008.

== Personal life ==
In 2001, she and her family moved to Ogden, Utah. She currently lives in Boise, Idaho.
