= Robert Livingston Johnson =

Robert Livingston Johnson (March 25, 1894 – January 16, 1966) was Temple University's third president (1941 to 1959) and a former vice president of Time Inc.

== Early life ==
Johnson was born in New York City to Frank R. and Grace Bell Johnson. He attended Norwalk Academy and the Taft School from 1910 to 1914. He attended Yale University until the declaration of war in 1917. He married Anna Talcot Rathbone before leaving for World War I with the First Infantry Division. He was stationed in France as a Lieutenant with the Seventh Field Artillery. He was on the front for four months before being reassigned as an instructor for new troops.

== Business career ==
After the war, he partnered with Henry Luce, Briton Hadden, and another Yale classmate to form Time, Inc. He served as vice president and advertising director for the upstart company. He took time off from the company to serve as relief administrator For Pennsylvania during the depression. He was later elected president of the National Civil Service Reform League. He left Time in 1938 to form his own management consultant and market analysis firm.

== Temple University ==
Johnson was recruited for his business skills to become president of the university in 1941. When some of the faculty objected because he did not have a formal degree, Yale gave him credit for military service and granted him a bachelor's degree. While he was president of the university, enrollment doubled, and he was effective at raising funds for expansion. He was granted two leaves of absence by the Temple Board of Trustees to assist with political campaigns and serve in the federal government. In 1952, he was initiated into the Kappa chapter of Sigma Pi fraternity.

He retired as president in 1959 and was given the new title of chancellor.

Johnson Hall, which was built on campus in 1962, was named for him.

== Politics ==
Johnson was very active in the Republican Party. His first leave of absence, in 1948, was to work with the Thomas Dewey's presidential campaign. His second leave of absence, in 1952, was to help create the United States Information Agency at the request of President Dwight Eisenhower. In 1960, he worked for the Nixon presidential campaign and helped to form various other local Republican groups. He was also appointed to the Republican National Committee in 1960. That activity brought pressure on the university from political foes and so Johnson resigned the chancellorship in 1961.
