= Jonathan Kaiman =

American journalist

Jonathan Kaiman is a journalist specializing in East Asia, especially China. He has also reported on Chinese activity in Africa as a grantee of the Pulitzer Center on Crisis Reporting, and has written for The New York Times, The Atlantic, Foreign Policy, and Reason magazine.

A 2001 graduate of The Hudson School in New Jersey, he went on to graduate from Vassar College in 2009 after which he spent a year as a Fulbright scholar investigating the impact of modernization on ethnic folk music in China. From September 2012 to February 2015, he was the China correspondent for The Guardian. From March 2015 through August 2016, he was the Asia correspondent for the Los Angeles Times. In 2017, National Public Radio noted that Kaiman was "granted rare access to Pyongyang celebration". Also in 2017, he was elected President of the Foreign Correspondents' Club of China; that same year, he was a Foreign Press Center Japan fellow. From August 2016 until September 2018, he was Beijing Bureau Chief for the Los Angeles Times.

Kaiman resigned from the Los Angeles Times as a result of allegations by Felicia Sonmez and another woman of sexually aggressive behavior. The accusations against him and his downfall have been a subject of continuing debate, in large part due to the decision of Ambra Battilana Gutierrez, one of the first women to accuse Harvey Weinstein of sexual misconduct, to interview him on her podcast.

He graduated student from the UCLA School of Law in 2023. He is currently a lawyer specializing in defamation.
