= The Hudson School =

Private school in Hudson County, New Jersey, United States

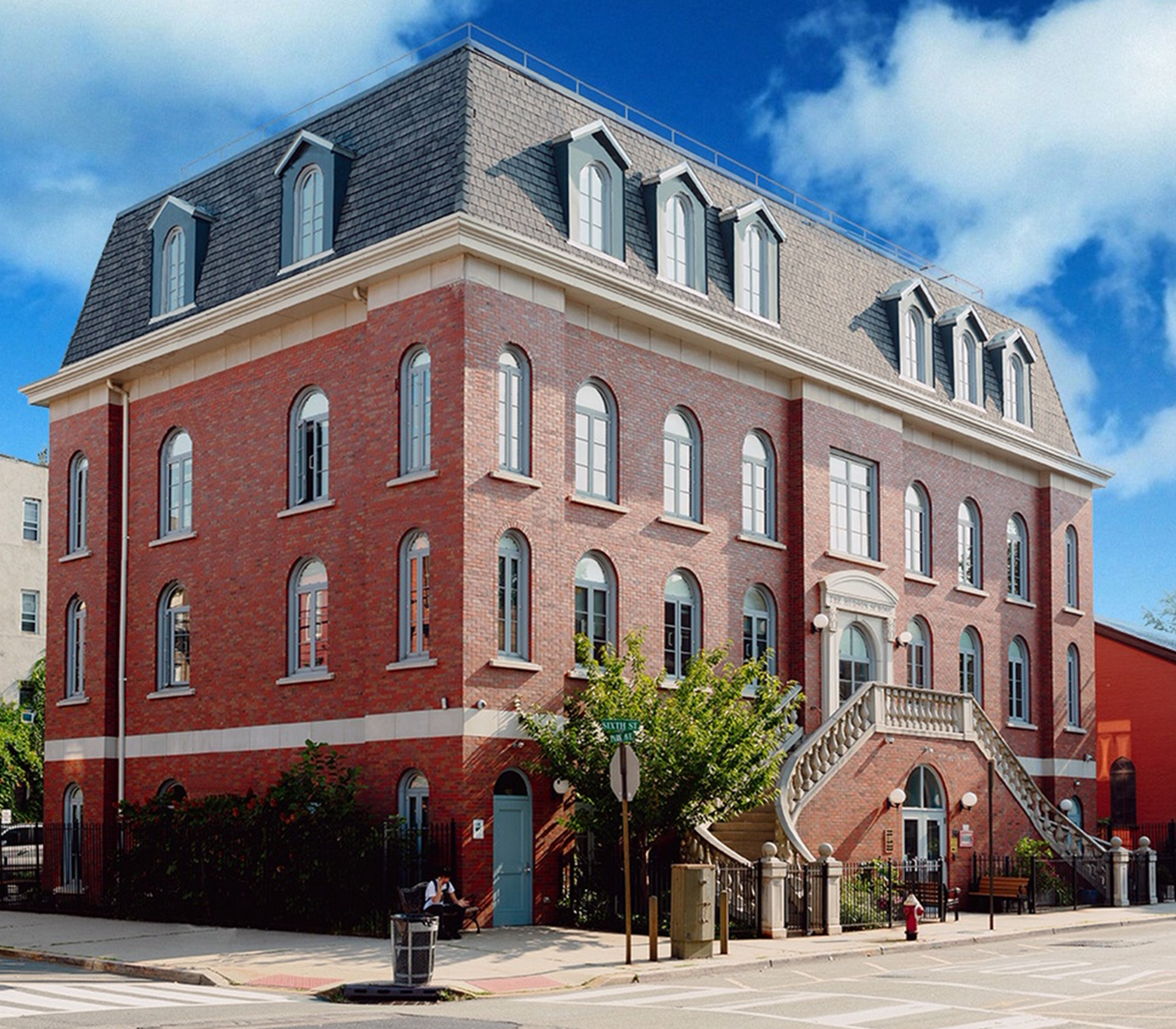

Location
- 601 Park Avenue; Hoboken, New Jersey 07030; United States
- 40.7441°N 74.0315°W

Information
- Type: Private school
- Motto: Courage, Compassion, Commitment
- Established: 1978
- Founder: Suellen Newman
- NCES School ID: 02043847
- Head of school: Rebekah Sollitto
- Faculty: 43.1 FTEs
- Grades: pre-K – 12
- Enrollment: 279 (as of 2024–25)
- Student to teacher ratio: 4.3:1
- Colors: Black & Gold
- Team name: Hudson Hornets
- Tuition: $25,660 (2022–23)
- Website: thehudsonschool.org

The Hudson School is a private, nonsectarian, coeducational day school located in Hoboken, New Jersey, serving students in PreK-3 through twelfth grades. The school has been accredited by the Middle States Association of Colleges and Schools Commission on Elementary and Secondary Schools since 1991; The school's accreditation status was extended for ten years in Fall 2018. The school is a member of the New Jersey Association of Independent Schools.

In September 2023, an announcement was made that The Hudson School and the Mustard Seed School, with 93 students in grades PreK-8, would merge for the 2024–25 school year under the name of The Hudson School. The combined school would become the only independent PreK-12 school in Hudson County. As part of the plan, the Mustard Seed School building would serve the joint school's PreK-8 students while the existing facility of The Hudson School would serve grades 9-12. For the 2023–24 school year, the Hudson School Middle School moved into the fourth floor of Mustard Seed School.

As of the 2021–22 school year, the school had an enrollment of 187 students and 43.1 classroom teachers (on an FTE basis), for a student–teacher ratio of 4.3:1. The school's student body was 51.9% (97) White, 16.6% (31) Asian, 13.4% (25) two or more races, 10.2% (19) Black and 8.0% (15) Hispanic.

== History ==
The Hudson School was founded in fall 1978 by Suellen Newman, with the financial assistance of the Geraldine R. Dodge Foundation, as an alternative to the available educational institutions in the local area. The school seeks to foster the Three C's ("courage, compassion and commitment") in its students, who are admitted because "they demonstrate a love of learning and don't mind a bit of hard work." In 1992, a high school was opened, since there were few high schools in the area with strong humanities and arts programs that admitted girls. The school moved to its current location in 2002.

== Rankings ==
In 2025, The Hudson School was ranked 1st in Hudson County and 31st in the state on the list of the best private high schools in New Jersey by Niche, with an academic score of A+.

== Academics ==
Some of the courses offered include pre-algebra, algebra, geometry, precalculus, environmental science, chemistry, physics, English, physical education, American history, geography, art, renaissance history, ethics and aesthetics. Languages offered are Spanish, French, Japanese, Mandarin, Russian, American Sign Language, Latin, and Greek.

== Notable staff ==
Andy Stapp, who protested the Vietnam War by joining and trying to unionize the military, taught history at The Hudson School for more than 25 years.

== Notable alumni ==
- Valentin Chmerkovskiy (born 1986), dancer.
- Jonathan Kaiman (class of 2001), journalist specializing in East Asia, especially China.
- Rob Menendez (born 1985), lawyer and politician who was elected to the U.S. House of Representatives from New Jersey's 8th congressional district in 2022.
- Ezra Miller (born 1992), actor, dropped out at age 16.
- Olivia Newman (class of 1996), film director and screenwriter best known for directing First Match (2018) and the 2022 feature adaptation of Where the Crawdads Sing.
- Molly Reckford (born 1992, class of 2007), rower who competed in the women's lightweight double sculls event at the 2020 Summer Olympics and at the 2024 Summer Olympics.
