= SmartMoney =

Finance magazine

- Frequency: Monthly
- Total circulation (2011): 812,305
- Founded: 1992
- Final issue: September 2012
- Company: Dow Jones & Company
- Country: United States
- Based in: New York City
- Language: English
- ISSN: 1069-2851

SmartMoney was The Wall Street Journal's magazine of personal business. The finance magazine launched in 1992 by Hearst Corporation and Dow Jones & Company. Its first editor was Norman Pearlstine. In 2010, Hearst sold its stake to Dow Jones. The September 2012 edition was the last paper edition. Its content was merged into MarketWatch in 2013.

SmartMoney's target market was affluent professional and managerial business people needing personal finance information. Regular topics included ideas for saving, investing, and spending, as well as coverage of technology, automotive, and lifestyle subjects including travel, fashion, wine, music, and food.

== Notable alumni ==
- Norman Pearlstine (SmartMoney magazine)—chief content officer of Bloomberg L.P.
- James B. Stewart (SmartMoney magazine)—New York Times columnist
- Gerri Willis (SmartMoney magazine, SmartMoney.com)—CNN anchor
