= Deena Guzder =

Deena Jal Guzder
- Born: November 1984 (age 41); Michigan, United States
- Education: Oberlin College (2006); Columbia University (2008)
- Occupations: Journalist, author, news producer, activist

Deena Jal Guzder (born November 1984) is a human rights journalist and author. Her work has appeared in Time, National Geographic Traveler, The Washington Post, United Press International, Reuters, Indian Express, Ms. Magazine, Global Post, Mother Jones, HuffPost, and Common Dreams.

== Early life and education ==
Guzder graduated from Oberlin College in 2006 with a triple major in Peace & Conflict Resolution, Politics, and English (concentrating on Creative Writing). Guzder earned a dual-degree from Columbia University Graduate School of Journalism and School of International and Public Affairs in May 2008. She is the youngest person to graduate from Columbia University Graduate School of Journalism.

== Career ==
She was awarded journalism grants from the Knight Foundation to report on theocracy and democracy in Iran; the Scripps Howard Foundation to report on low-caste Dalit in India; and the Pulitzer Center on Crisis Reporting to report on forced prostitution and human trafficking in Thailand as well as a report for Red Cross Red Crescent magazine on the value of volunteers during the 2010 Pakistan floods.

Guzder works at Democracy Now! in New York City.

== Personal life ==
As an antiwar activist, Guzder grew interested in the way politicians warp religion to justify warfare.

Raised as a Zoroastrian, Guzder's beliefs center on "good words, good thoughts, good deeds". She has stated: "I don’t describe as anything. I think labels constrict people’s understanding of concepts or ideas." Although not a Christian, she has said she came to greatly appreciate the Historic Peace Churches and Catholic Worker Movement.

== Works ==
Guzder wrote a book about the spiritual left, Divine Rebels: American Christian Activists for Social Justice (2011).

Guzder also helped Shyalpa Rinpoche, a Tibetan Buddhist lama, to compile his oral teachings into Living Fully.

She also assisted Pulitzer Prize-winning journalist Chris Hedges research his 2010 book Death of the Liberal Class.

== Publications ==
- Guzder, Deena; Gottlieb, Roger S.; Claiborne, Shane (2011). Divine Rebels: American Christian Activists for Social Justice. Chicago Review Press. ISBN 978-1569762646.
- Guzder, Deena (June 12, 2010). "Witness Against Torture: Peace Activists Face Trial". Common Dreams.
- Guzder, Deena (May 9, 2011). "Daniel Berrigan: A Lifetime of Peace Activism". Common Dreams.
- Guzder, Deena (January 27, 2014). "Aaron Swartz at Sundance". Al Jazeera English.
- Guzder, Deena (February 14, 2014). "Bar-crossed lovers: Making a marriage work when a spouse is serving life". Al Jazeera English.
- Guzder, Deena (February 28, 2015). "Black Lives Matter needs the Black Panthers". Al Jazeera English.

== Interviews ==
- "The Drew Marshall Show". Drew Marshall. April 30, 2011.
- Tell Me More (December 24, 2009). "Zoroastrianism An Ancient, Shrinking Religion". NPR.
