= Henry Luce =

American magazine publisher (1898–1967)

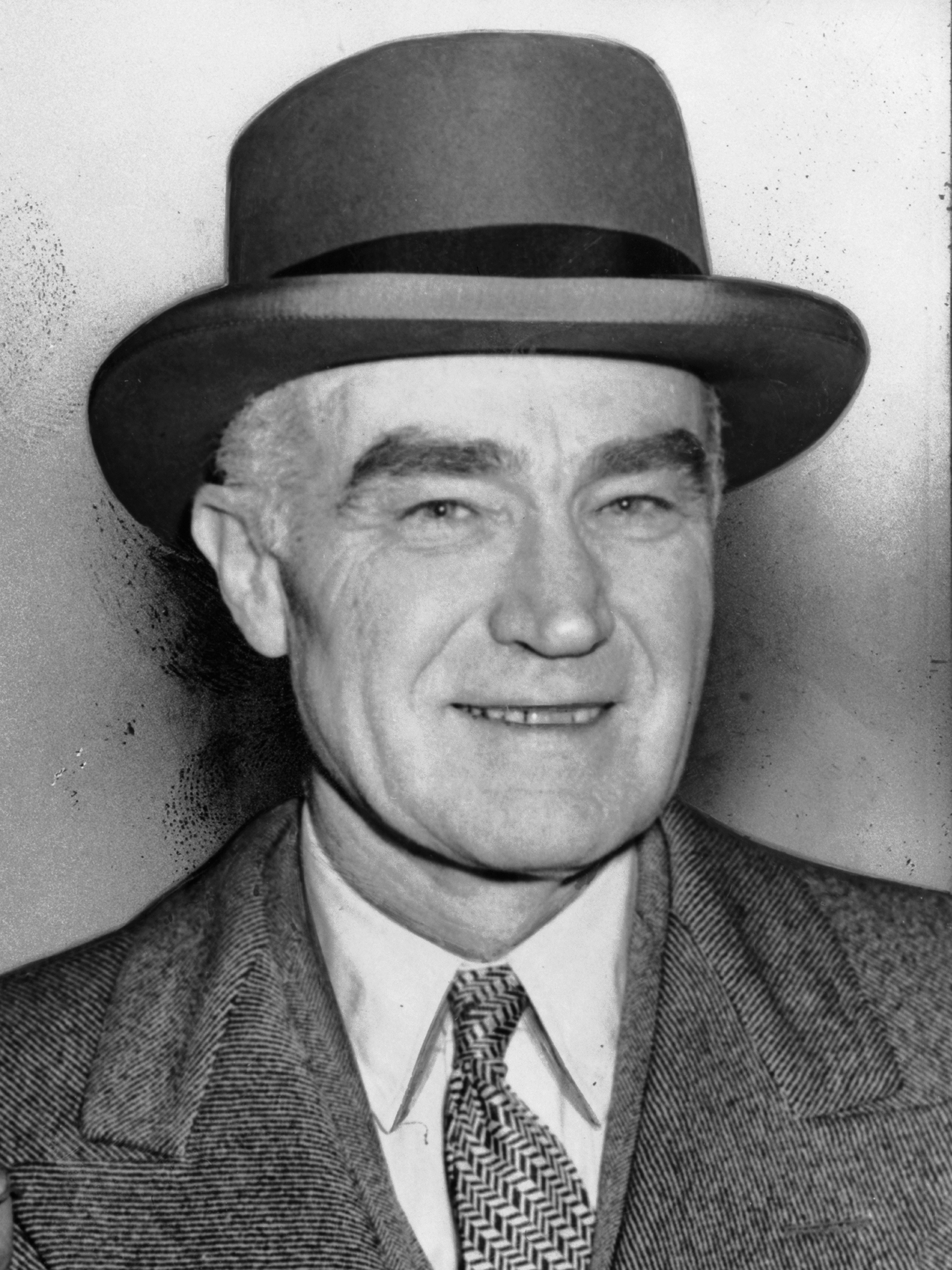
- Luce in 1954
- Born: Henry Robinson Luce; April 3, 1898; Tengchow, China
- Died: February 28, 1967 (aged 68); Phoenix, Arizona, U.S.
- Education: Yale University
- Occupations: Publisher, journalist
- Political party: Republican
- Spouses: Lila Ross Hotz (m. 1923; div. 1935) Clare Boothe Luce (m. 1935)
- Children: 3
- Parent: Henry W. Luce

Henry Robinson Luce (April 3, 1898 – February 28, 1967) was an American magazine publisher who founded Time, Life, Fortune, and Sports Illustrated. He was known as one of "the most influential [Americans] of his day."

Born in Shandong, China, to parents from the United States who were serving as Presbyterian missionaries, Luce moved to the U.S. at the age of 15 and later attended Yale University. He launched and closely supervised a stable of magazines that transformed journalism and the reading habits of millions of Americans. Time summarized and interpreted the week's news; Life was a picture magazine of politics, culture, and society that dominated American visual perceptions in the era before television; Fortune reported on national and international business; and Sports Illustrated explored the world of sports.

Counting his radio projects and newsreels, Luce created the first multimedia corporation. He envisioned the United States as a world power, and in 1941 he declared the 20th century to be the "American Century."

== Early life and education ==
Luce was born in Tengchow, Shandong, China, now Penglai, on April 3, 1898, the son of Elizabeth Root Luce and Henry Winters Luce, who was a Presbyterian missionary.

At 15, he was sent to the U.S. to attend the Hotchkiss School in Connecticut, where he tried hard to overcome his stuttering. As a scholarship student he was isolated from the upper-class boys. He was subsidized by an elderly Chicago heiress, Nancy Fowler McCormick, who favored sons of missionaries. Applying himself to study, Luce quickly became the top student. He was especially strong in languages, studying Greek, Latin, French, and German, and already knowing Chinese. He edited the Hotchkiss Literary Monthly. There, he first met Briton Hadden; they became best friends.

Hotchkiss was a feeder prep school for Yale University. After a summer spent working on a Springfield newspaper, Luce matriculated in the fall of 1916. He was the top freshman academically, but grades did not confer as much prestige as a staff role on the Yale Daily News. Only four freshmen were chosen by the News; they included Luce and Hadden. When the U.S. entered World War I in 1917, a third of the students joined the army; the rest, including Luce, joined the Reserve Officers' Training Corps (ROTC) and attended class in uniform.

Luce also joined Alpha Delta Phi, a minor fraternity. His grades remained top-level, and every spare hour was devoted to newspaper work. Luce and Hadden were the two outstanding journalists; when the vote came in January 1918 for chairmanship of the News, Hadden beat Luce by one vote. Luce instead became managing editor and the two worked closely together and started planning their future. Meanwhile, the Army assigned them as ROTC leaders to train new recruits. The war ended before either was commissioned.

In January 1919, Luce and Hadden returned to Yale University as juniors. In May 1919, they were both tapped into the prestigious Skull and Bones secret society. Luce tried, but failed, to win a Rhodes Scholarship to the University of Oxford, but he was admitted to the university and paid his way. He spent the year travelling Europe, observing the post-World War I scene closely. He returned to the United States to take a newspaper job in Chicago as a junior reporter.

== Career ==
Nightly discussions of the concept of a news magazine led Luce and Hadden, both age 23, to quit their jobs in 1922. Later that same year, they partnered with Robert Livingston Johnson and another Yale classmate to form Time Inc.

Luce, who remained editor-in-chief of all his publications until 1964, was also an influential figure in the Republican Party. Supported by editor-in-chief T. S. Matthews, he appointed Whittaker Chambers as acting Foreign News editor in 1944, despite Chambers' well-known feuds with reporters in the field. In 1941, he authored an editorial for Life titled "The American Century", in which he articulated his vision for the role of U.S. foreign policy for the remainder of the 20th century. Luce proclaimed that "We are the inheritors of all the great principles of Western civilization. It now becomes our time to be the powerhouse."

An instrumental figure behind the so-called "China Lobby", he played a large role in steering American foreign policy and popular sentiment in favor of Kuomintang leader Chiang Kai-shek and his wife, Soong Mei-ling, in their war against the Japanese. (The Chiangs appeared in the cover of Time eleven times between 1927 and 1955.) He was a member of Pearl S. Buck's "China Emergency Relief Committee" and in 1941 founded his own organization the "United China Appeal". In a 1965 diary entry, British publisher Cecil Harmsworth King recorded a dinner with Luce, noting that although Luce was "getting old and deaf," he remained a formidable personality. King reported that Luce praised the progress made in Taiwan and expressed contempt for the People's Republic of China, observing that its steel production was only 10 million tons a year, roughly the tonnage the United States used for ash-cans.

Luce supported various anti-communist causes during his life. He donated seventy-one shares of Time Inc. to the American Committee for Cultural Freedom and in 1952 donated $10,000 to the Partisan Review, which helped to keep it in business when it was undergoing financial difficulties. In 1949 the National Committee for a Free Europe was established, with Luce being appointed to its board of directors. He was a member of Robert E. Wood's American Security Council and served on its "Cold War Victory Advisory Committee". In 1957 he was appointed to a Rockefeller Foundation panel to formulate a vision of America foreign policy.

Luce championed the president of South Vietnam, Ngo Dinh Diem, featuring him on the cover of Time in April 1955. In May 1957 he presided over a dinner organized by the International Rescue Committee and the American Friends of Vietnam, at which Diem was the guest of honor. Luce admired Diem as an anti-communist and praised him as a statesman who had "held back the flood of Communism which threatened to engulf his country".

== Personal life ==
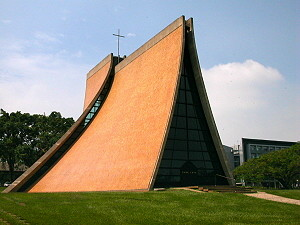
The Luce Memorial Chapel at Tunghai University in Taiwan

Luce met his first wife, Lila Hotz, while he was studying at Yale University in 1919. They married in 1923 and had two children, Peter Paul and Henry Luce III, before divorcing in 1935. Luce was a Christian and as a young man was a member of the Young People's Society of Christian Endeavour and the Young Men's Christian Association.

In 1935, he married his second wife, Clare Boothe Luce, who had an 11-year-old daughter, Ann Clare Brokaw, whom he raised as his own. Ann Clare died in a car accident when she was 19.

Both Henry and Claire had positive experiences in guided LSD sessions well before there were legal restrictions on the drug.

Luce died of a coronary occlusion on February 28, 1967 in Phoenix, Arizona. He was 68. At his death, he was said to be worth $100 million in Time Inc. stock. Most of his fortune went to the Henry Luce Foundation.

== Legacy ==
Luce was honored by the United States Postal Service with a 32¢ Great Americans series (1980–2000) postage stamp. Luce was inducted into the Junior Achievement U.S. Business Hall of Fame.

== Henry Luce Foundation ==
The Henry Luce Foundation, Inc. is a private, nonprofit organization incorporated in New York. It was established in 1936 by Henry Luce in his thirties. His son Henry III served as its chairman and chief executive for many years.
