= Norman Pearlstine =

American magazine editor (born 1942)

- Born: October 4, 1942 (age 84); Collegeville, Pennsylvania, US
- Education: A.B. Haverford College; J.D. University of Pennsylvania
- Spouse(s): Charlene Weinstein (divorced); Adele Wilson (divorced); Nancy Friday (divorced); Jane Boon
- Parent(s): Gladys Cohen Pearlstine; Raymond Pearlstine
- Family: Roy Hattersley (brother-in-law)

Norman Pearlstine (born October 4, 1942) is an American editor and media executive. He previously held senior positions at the Los Angeles Times, Time Inc, Bloomberg L.P., Forbes and The Wall Street Journal.

== Early life and education ==
Pearlstine was born and raised in a Jewish family in Collegeville, Pennsylvania, the son of Gladys (née Cohen) and Raymond Pearlstine. His mother was chairman of Montgomery County Community College and his father was an attorney. He has two sisters, one of whom is literary agent Maggie Pearlstine Hattersley (who was married to the late British politician Roy Hattersley). He graduated from The Hill School and then received a Bachelor of Arts in history from Haverford College. He obtained a J.D. from the University of Pennsylvania and did postgraduate work at the law school of Southern Methodist University. He was Editor of the Haverford News, worked summers while in college as a reporting intern at the Allentown Evening Chronicle and The Philadelphia Inquirer and, while in law school, as legislative assistant for Congressman Richard S. Schweiker (R.-Pa.) and a research assistant working on death row and civil rights cases for professor Anthony G. Amsterdam.

== Career ==
Pearlstine worked for the Wall Street Journal from 1968 to 1992, except for a two-year period, 1978–1980, when he was an executive editor for Forbes magazine. At the Journal, he was a staff reporter in Dallas, Detroit, and Los Angeles (1968–73); Tokyo bureau chief (1973–76); managing editor of The Asian Wall Street Journal (1976–78); national editor (1980–81); editor and publisher of The Wall Street Journal/Europe (1982–83); managing editor (1983–91); and executive editor (1991–92).

He was interim president of the New-York Historical Society from 1992 to 1994.

After leaving the Wall Street Journal he launched SmartMoney and was later the general partner of Friday Holdings (along with Richard Rainwater, Barry Diller and Paramount Pictures chief Martin S. Davis), a multimedia investment company, prior to succeeding Jason McManus as editor in chief at Time Inc. in 1995, the first outsider in the position. He was editor in chief of Time Inc. between January 1, 1995, and December 31, 2005.

Pearlstine was a senior adviser to the Carlyle Group's telecommunications and media group in New York. Pearlstine then joined Bloomberg L.P. in June 2008 as chief content officer, a newly created position. In that role Pearlstine was charged with seeking growth opportunities for Bloomberg's television, radio, magazine, and online products and to make the most of the company's news operations. Pearlstine also was chairman of Bloomberg Businessweek, the magazine Bloomberg L.P. acquired from McGraw-Hill in 2009, and as co-chairman of Bloomberg Government, a web-based subscription service devoted to coverage of the impact of government actions on business, including legislation, regulation, and contracts.

In October 2013, Pearlstine returned to Time Inc. as chief content officer, a position similar to the one he held at Bloomberg. In July 2017, he retired from Time Inc. He briefly served through the end of 2017 as the Chief Information Architect of Money.net, a financial data company.

On June 18, 2018, Pearlstine was named executive editor of the Los Angeles Times by owner Patrick Soon-Shiong. In October 2020, Pearlstine stepped down from his post at the Times.

Pearlstine has since returned to writing, and he serves as an advisor to North Base Media, a venture firm, as well as ITN Mediagene, an Asian media and technology group, and Majarra, an Arab-language business information service. He is co-chair of The Annenberg Center on Communication Leadership & Policy at the University of Southern California, and he serves on the boards of three other nonprofits serving journalists and journalism -- the Reporters Committee for Freedom of the Press, the Alliance for Trust in Media, the Shorenstein Center at Harvard’s Kennedy School. He is also a member of the American Academy of Arts and Sciences, the American Antiquarian Society, the Asia Society, the Council on Foreign Relations, and the D.C. Bar.

== Personal ==
Pearlstine has been married four times. During college, he married Charlene Weinstein; they divorced while he was in law school. In 1973, he married Adele Wilson, a schoolteacher. In 1988, he married Nancy Friday; they divorced in 2005. In the same year, he married Jane Boon, an industrial engineer and the author of the novels Edge Play and Bold Strokes.

== Recognition ==
In January 2005, the American Society of Magazine Editors named Pearlstine the recipient of its Lifetime Achievement Award and inducted him into the Magazine Editors’ Hall of Fame. He was honored with the Gerald Loeb Lifetime Achievement Award for Distinguished Business and Financial Journalism in 2000. He received the National Press Foundation's Editor of the Year Award in 1989.

Pearlstine received the 2019 Medal for Lifetime Achievement in Journalism from the Poynter Institute during their annual Bowtie Ball on November 2, 2019.

Pearlstine previously served on the boards of the Tribeca Film Institute and the Watson Institute for International and Public Affairs. He was a member of the advisory board of the Craig Newmark Graduate School of Journalism at the City University of New York. He was on the boards of the Carnegie Corporation, and the Committee to Protect Journalists. From 2006 to 2011, Pearlstine was president and CEO of the American Academy in Berlin.

Pearlstine was briefly part of the controversy surrounding Matthew Cooper when, after the United States Supreme Court refused to review adverse lower court decisions, he gave Cooper's notes to the independent prosecutor investigating the outing of Valerie Plame as a covert agent of the CIA. From this experience, Pearlstine wrote a book entitled Off the Record: The Press, the Government, and the War over Anonymous Sources for Farrar, Straus and Giroux.
