= Nancy Gibbs =

American writer

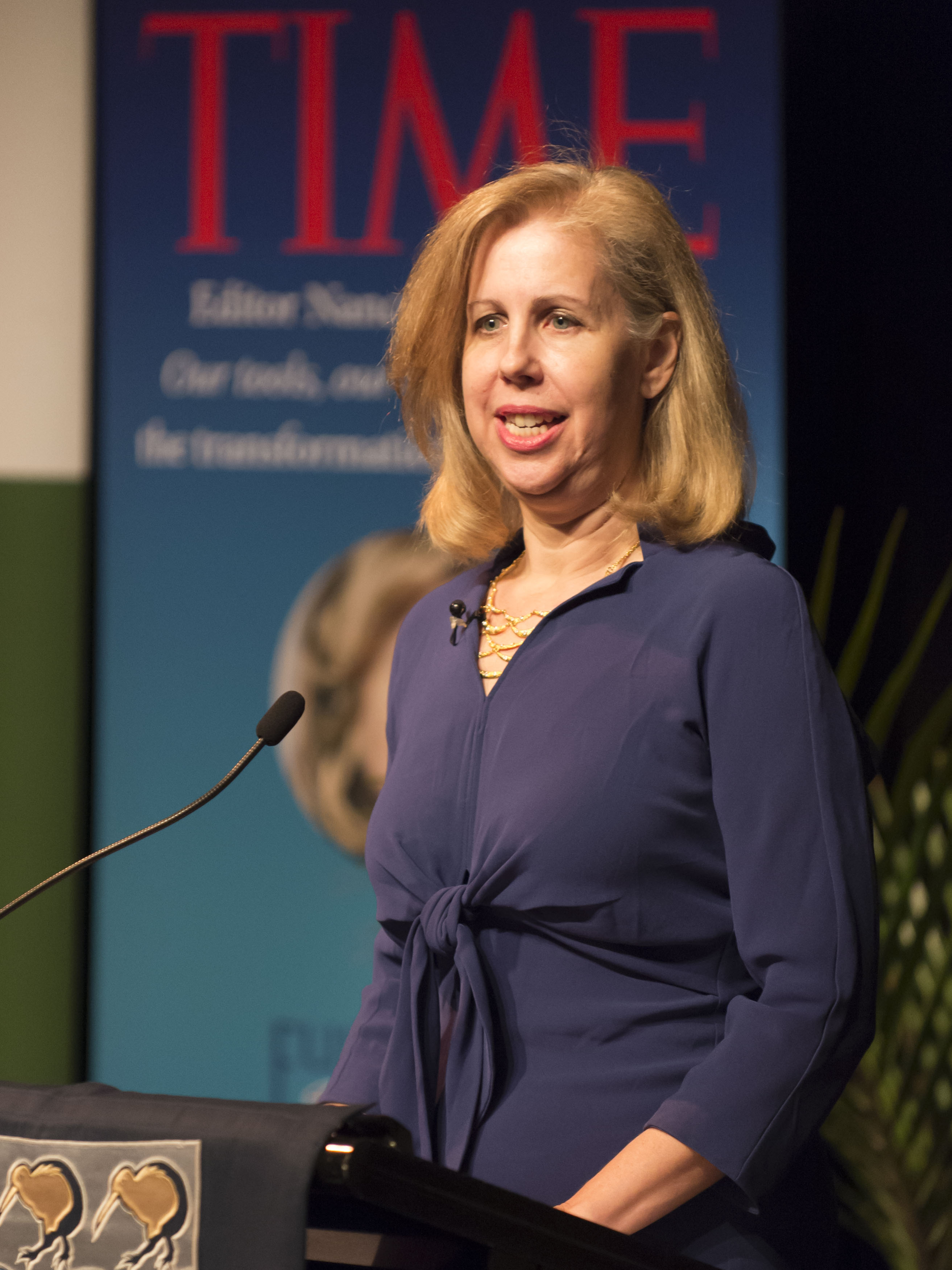
- Gibbs in 2015
- Born: Nancy Reid Gibbs; January 25, 1960 (age 66); New York City, U.S.
- Occupations: Shorenstein Center director and professor, Harvard Kennedy School

Nancy Reid Gibbs (born January 25, 1960) is an American essayist, speaker, and presidential historian.

She is the former managing editor for TIME magazine, an author, and commentator on politics and values in the United States. She is the co-author, with Michael Duffy, of The New York Times Bestsellers The Preacher and the Presidents: Billy Graham in the White House (2007) and The Presidents Club: Inside the World's Most Exclusive Fraternity (2012).

Gibbs currently serves as the Lombard Director of the Shorenstein Center on Media, Politics and Public Policy at Harvard Kennedy School. She is also the Visiting Edward R. Murrow Professor of Press, Politics and Public Policy, teaching Politics of the Press and Op-ed Writing.

== Early life and education ==
Gibbs was born in New York City, the daughter of Janet (née Stang), who worked at Friends Seminary, and Howard Glenn Gibbs, who was the Associate National Director for the Boys Clubs of America. She attended Yale University (Berkeley College) and graduated in 1982, summa cum laude, with honors in history. She then studied at New College, Oxford as a Marshall Scholar (M.A. in Politics, Philosophy and Economics) graduating in 1984.

A third-generation Chautauquan, Gibbs began her journalism career in 1976, writing for The Chautauquan Daily, Chautauqua Institution's newsletter, during the summers until 1980.

== Career with TIME magazine ==
Gibbs joined TIME in 1985 as a part-time fact checker in the International section. She became a writer in 1988. Gibbs has written more cover stories than any other writer, publishing over 175 stories.

Of note is her work in the black-bordered special issue on the September 11th attacks, featuring her article titled "If You Want to Humble an Empire", which won a National Magazine Award in 2002. The Chicago Tribune named her one of the ten best magazine writers in the country in 2003; her articles are included in the Princeton Anthology of Writing, Best American Crime Writing 2004, Best American Political Writing 2005 and TIME: 85 years of Great Writing.

In October 2013, Gibbs became the 17th editor-in-chief and first-ever female managing editor of TIME magazine. Prior to her appointment, she managed the "magazine's transition into a digital newsroom." Under her leadership, TIME's digital audience grew from 25 to 55 million, and video streams passed 1 billion a year. TIME also won a primetime Emmy award for its two-part A Year in Space documentary, produced with PBS. TIME also won the ASME award for Cover of the Year, for the October 24, 2016 edition.

Although Gibbs stepped down from the Editor in Chief position in September 2017, she remains an Editor at Large. In 2021, Gibbs wrote about former President Donald Trump for TIME's TIME100 list of influential global figures.

== Interviews and lectures ==
She has been a frequent guest on radio and television talk shows, including the Today Show, Good Morning America, Charlie Rose, and a guest essayist on the NewsHour with Jim Lehrer. Gibbs has lectured extensively on the American presidency, including at the Bush, Reagan, Carter, Johnson and Truman libraries, the Aspen Institute, the Dallas World Affairs Club, the Commonwealth Club and the National Archives.

== Other affiliations ==
In 1993 and 2006, Gibbs served as a Ferris Professor of writing at Princeton University. She is a former elder and deacon of the Fifth Avenue Presbyterian Church in New York City.

In April 2019, Gibbs was named Faculty Director of the Shorenstein Center in Media, Politics and Public Policy in addition to her appointment as the Visiting Edward R. Murrow Professor of Practice of Press, Politics and Public Policy at the Kennedy School.

In October 2022, Gibbs joined the Council for Responsible Social Media project launched by Issue One to address the negative mental, civic, and public health impacts of social media in the United States co-chaired by former House Democratic Caucus Leader Dick Gephardt and former Massachusetts Lieutenant Governor Kerry Healey.

== Awards and honors ==
- 2013 Chautauqua Prize, shortlist, The Presidents Club
