= Michael Scott Moore =

American journalist

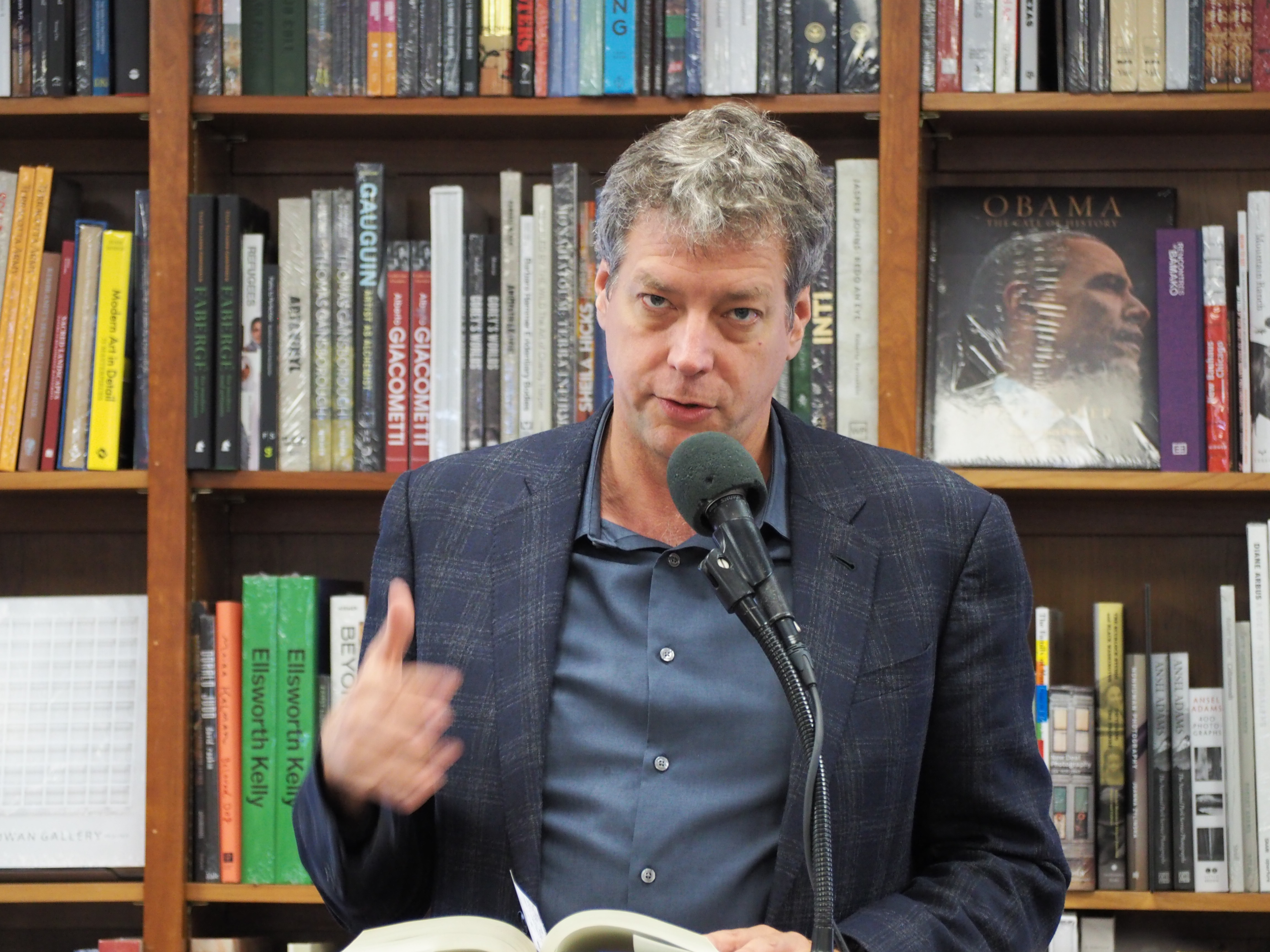
- Moore reads at Politics & Prose bookstore, July 28, 2018
- Born: 1969 (age 56–57); Los Angeles, California
- Citizenship: US, Germany
- Education: University of California, San Diego
- Occupations: Author, journalist
- Writing career
- Language: English, German
- Genres: non-fiction, fiction
- Website: radiofreemike.net/home

Michael Scott Moore (born 1969) is an American journalist and novelist. He is the author of Sweetness and Blood (2010), a nonfiction book about the global history of surfing, and The Desert and the Sea (2018), a memoir about his captivity in Somalia. His work has appeared in publications such as The Atlantic, The New Republic, and the Los Angeles Times, and he has served as a writer for SF Weekly and as an editor for Spiegel Online International.

Moore graduated from University of California, San Diego in 1991 with a degree in German Literature. He lives in Berlin and also holds German citizenship. In January 2012, he was abducted in Galkayo, Somalia while researching a book about modern piracy. Moore was held captive for over two and a half years, and released September 22, 2014. He is a member of the Board of Directors of Hostage US, a non-profit that supports American hostages and their families.

== Abduction ==
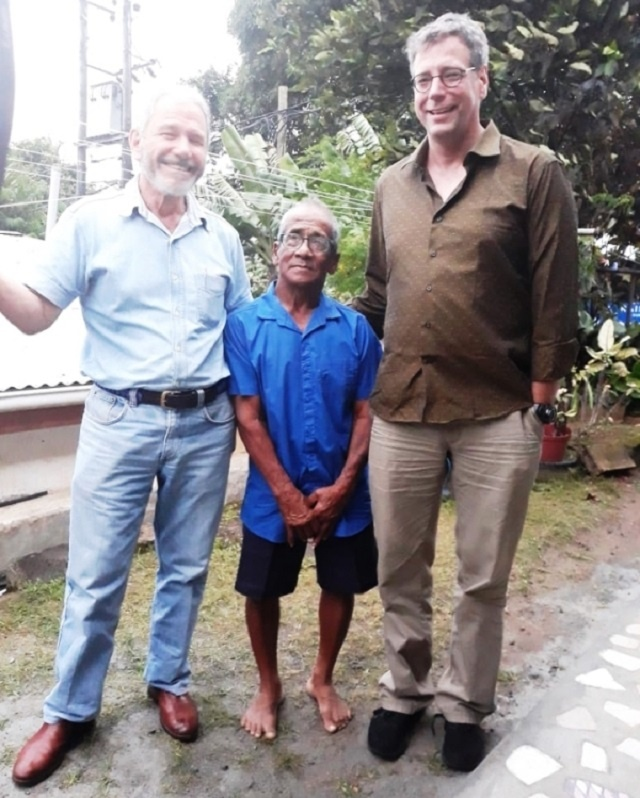
Moore (right) with fellow hostage Rolly Tambara at a reunion in Seychelles in 2018

=== Background ===
Moore traveled to Somalia on a grant from the Pulitzer Center for Crisis Reporting to research a book on piracy. He arrived in the town of Galkayo in January 2012 as part of this reporting assignment.

=== Kidnapping ===
While in Galkayo, Moore was abducted by a local gang of pirates. Several days later, two aid workers, Jessica Buchanan and Poul Thisted, also being held by Somali pirates, were rescued by a Navy SEAL operation. The pirates holding Moore subsequently demanded $20 million.

=== Captivity and negotiations ===
Officials from the United States and the German Foreign Ministry collaborated on negotiations with the pirates. He was held for more than two and a half years (977 days) before being freed on September 22, 2014. A ransom of $1.6 million was paid for his release.

=== Legal consequences ===
In 2024, two of the pirates involved in Moore's abduction were each sentenced to 30 years in American prisons.

== Career ==
Moore has published three books, including the novel Too Much of Nothing, published by Carroll & Graf, and the nonfiction history of surfing Sweetness and Blood: How Surfing Spread from Hawaii and California to the Rest of the World, with Some Unexpected Results, published by Rodale in 2010. Sweetness and Blood was named a Best Book of 2010 by The Economist and PopMatters. The Desert and the Sea received positive critical attention and appeared on Apple Books category bestseller lists in August 2018.

Moore worked as the theater columnist for SF Weekly, until he moved to Berlin, Germany in 2005. In Germany he worked as both a staff and a freelance editor for Spiegel Online International. In 2010-11 he covered a trial of ten Somali pirates in Hamburg who were charged with trying to hijack the MV Taipan.

His journalism has been published in The Atlantic Monthly, The New Republic, and the Los Angeles Times. From 2009 to 2012, he also wrote a weekly column for Miller-McCune (now Pacific Standard) on trans-Atlantic issues, including the NATO effort against Somali pirates. In 2009, for the column, he sailed on the Turkish frigate Gediz which had been charged with catching pirates in the Gulf of Aden.

== Works ==
- Too Much of Nothing New York : Carroll & Graf Publishers, 2003. ISBN 9780786711963, OCLC 52460026
- Sweetness and Blood: How Surfing Spread from Hawaii and California to the Rest of the World, with Some Unexpected Results. New York, NY : Rodale, 2010. ISBN 9781605294278, OCLC 922046069
- The Desert and the Sea : 977 Days Captive on the Somali Pirate Coast, New York, NY : Harper Wave, 2018. ISBN 9780062449177, OCLC 967079760
