= Jason McManus =

American journalist (1934–2019)

Jason Donald McManus (March 3, 1934 – September 19, 2019) was an American journalist who served as Editor-in-Chief of Time Inc. from 1987 to 1994. He died in September 2019.

== Life and career ==
McManus, a 1956 graduate of Davidson College, became a Rhodes Scholar in 1958 after receiving a master's degree in public affairs from Princeton University. He began working for Time Inc. in 1957 as a summer intern with Sports Illustrated. He joined Time magazine in 1959 as a writer in the magazine's World section and later served as the magazine's first Common Market bureau chief in Paris.

In 1964 he shifted to editing, working in the World and Nation sections of the magazine, overseeing coverage of the Watergate scandal. In the late 1970s, both McManus and Ray Cave were assistant managing editors at Time and began a professional rivalry internally. The two editors were frequently up for the same positions, with MacManus reporting to Cave until 1985, when McManus replaced Cave as managing editor of Time, while Cave moved to be "Corporate Editor" at Time Inc.

After working with both men in different capacities, Editor-in-Chief Henry Anatole Grunwald recommended McManus replace him in the position he had held since 1979. McManus became editor-in-chief of Time Inc.with Cave in the number two post of editorial director until he left the company in 1988, with some saying McManus forced him out.

Retiring at the end of 1994 one year before his contract expired, McManus was succeeded by Norman Pearlstine.

McManus served on the Council on Foreign Relations and was awarded an honorary degree from University of North Carolina, Asheville in 1991.
