= Magoun =

Magoun may refer to:

Surname

- Francis Peabody Magoun MC (1895–1979), scholar of medieval and English literature in the 20th century
- George C. Magoun (1840–1893), chairman of the Board of the Atchison, Topeka and Santa Fe Railway
- George Frederick Magoun (1821–1896), Congregationalist minister, the first president of Iowa College
- Horace Winchell Magoun (1907–1991), American neuroscientist and neuroendocrinologist
- Thatcher Magoun (1775–1856), shipbuilder who specialized in large ships and brigs

Ships

- Thatcher Magoun (clipper), extreme clipper launched in 1855, named after Medford's shipbuilder Thatcher Magoun

Geography

- Adams-Magoun House, historic house at 483 Broadway in Somerville, Massachusetts
- Magoun Square, neighborhood on the border of Medford and Somerville, Massachusetts

== See also ==
- Maghound
- Magou
- Mangouin
