= WGBO-DT =

Television station in Joliet, Illinois

- Joliet–Chicago, Illinois; United States
- City: Joliet, Illinois
- Channels: Digital: 35 (UHF); Virtual: 66
- Branding: Univision Chicago; Noticias N+ Univision Chicago (newscasts)

Programming
- Affiliations: 66.1: Univision; for others, see § Subchannels

Ownership
- Owner: TelevisaUnivision; (WGBO License Partnership, G.P.)
- Sister stations: WXFT-DT, WOJO, WPPN, WVIV-FM

History
- First air date: September 18, 1981
- Former call signs: WFBN (1981–1986); WGBO-TV (1986–2009)
- Former channel numbers: Analog: 66 (UHF, 1981–2009); Digital: 53 (UHF, 2005–2009), 38 (UHF, 2009–2019)
- Former affiliations: Independent (1981–1995); Spectrum (subscription TV, 1981–1984)
- Call sign meaning: Owned by Grant Broadcasting in the mid-1980s

Technical information
- Licensing authority: FCC
- Facility ID: 12498
- ERP: 635 kW
- HAAT: 403 m (1,322 ft)
- Transmitter coordinates: 41°53′55.6″N 87°37′23.7″W

Links
- Public license information: Public file; LMS
- Website: www.univision.com/local/chicago-wgbo

WGBO-DT (channel 66) is a television station licensed to Joliet, Illinois, United States, serving as the Chicago-area outlet for the Spanish-language network Univision. It is owned and operated by TelevisaUnivision alongside Aurora-licensed UniMás station WXFT-DT (channel 60). The two stations share studios at 541 North Fairbanks Court in the Streeterville neighborhood; WGBO-DT's transmitter is located atop the John Hancock Center.

WGBO was established as WFBN in 1981 and primarily aired subscription television (STV) programming from the Spectrum service. After a consolidation in the Chicago STV market in 1984, the station converted to a more typical independent station. It was owned by the Grant Broadcasting System from 1986 to 1988, during which time it was the least successful station in the company's portfolio. Combined Broadcasting, the consortium of creditors formed in the wake of Grant's bankruptcy, sold the station to Univision in 1994, giving the network its first full-time outlet in Chicago in six years. Since 1995, WGBO has been Chicago's Univision station and has also produced Spanish-language local newscasts.

== History ==
=== Early years and Focus ownership ===
In 1979, four firms applied for construction permits to build television stations on channel 66 in Joliet, Illinois. Three of them had the same idea. American Television and Communications Corporation (ATC) was the division of Time Inc. that owned subscription television (STV) service Preview. Channel 66 of Illinois was owned by Clint Murchison, who owned Subscription Television of America. Focus Broadcasting Company, a company headquartered in Nashville, Tennessee, was the third applicant; it, too, sought STV, having secured a lease for technology and programming of the Wometco Home Theater service operating in the New York area. A fourth bid was received from Lago Grande Television Company.

The four bidders agreed on a settlement under which Focus was granted the construction permit on July 22, 1980. ATC and Lago Grande's bids were dismissed after the companies were reimbursed for their costs. Murchison provided financing for the station, guaranteeing loans of up to $7 million for its construction in exchange for most of the revenue to be garnered from STV programming. However, before launch, Murchison sold most of his interest to another Texas company: Buford Television of Tyler. Buford, whose only broadcast properties were TV stations in Tyler and Lufkin, Texas, was making an entry into the STV game. In 1980, it built and signed on WBTI, a hybrid subscription and ad-supported station in Cincinnati, and it had filed for permits to build similar stations in other cities.

WFBN began broadcasting on September 18, 1981, and its subscription offering, Spectrum, initiated programming on the 29th. Several months later, Buford sold a majority 80 percent stake in its STV interests, grouped under the Home Entertainment Network banner, to United Cable of Denver for $20 million. United launched its third and final STV station, KTMA-TV in Minneapolis, in September 1982.

Spectrum was Chicago's second-largest STV operation behind ON TV on WSNS-TV (channel 44). By March 1983, WFBN's Spectrum had 60,000 subscribers to the 125,000 for ON TV on WSNS; further, Spectrum had not turned a profit since it launched, and the industry was starting to shrink as cable penetration increased (though the city of Chicago itself was still not cabled). It tied up almost all of channel 66's broadcast hours, with WFBN's lone free offerings being a daily exercise show and a public affairs program aired twice a week. The station, however, did try several other ad-supported programs in 1983, the most notable being a morning show, It's Too Early, helmed by longtime Chicago radio DJ Steve Dahl; it lasted less than a month after Focus claimed viewers complained, thinking the program too obscene for "public viewing".

In August 1983, United Cable wrote down the Home Entertainment Network division and put all three of its STV systems up for sale. United Cable sold the Chicago business to ON TV parent Oak Communications, and Spectrum subscribers began viewing a simulcast of ON TV programming on March 1, 1984, allowing for Oak to convert them to ON TV equipment using WSNS-TV's signal.

WFBN began to prepare for a life beyond STV programming. Operational responsibilities were transferred to UPI, the wire service that Focus principals Douglas Ruhe and William Geissler had purchased in 1982. Media Capital Group took a minority stake in the station; the firm solicited investors for limited partnerships. The STV simulcasts ended on May 31, 1984, and the next day, the station debuted an interim format consisting of 18 hours a day of music videos to last it through the summer. The station then became a conventional independent station focusing on syndicated reruns and movies, as well as telecasts of Loyola Ramblers basketball games.

=== Grant and Combined ownership ===
Ruhe and Geissler's businesses began to experience financial reversals in 1984, with UPI filing for bankruptcy early the next year. Focus put WFBN up for sale and reached a deal to sell a 50-percent interest in the station to the Grant Broadcasting System in September 1985 for $2 million and an estimated $50 million in debt (some of which was forgiven or refinanced). Grant also obtained an option to acquire the remaining 50% interest by 1990. With many program distributors having gone unpaid, some since September 1984, Focus and Grant warned that any failure to approve the deal would likely lead to the station leaving the air or even involuntary bankruptcy. Metrowest Corporation, then-owners of competing WPWR-TV (channel 60), filed a petition to deny the sale, claiming that even before it acquired the WFBN license, Grant had attempted to "stifle competition in the Chicago television market with multimarket program purchases, exclusive arrangements and similar deals". Grant was reported to be keen on reducing and restructuring expensive agreements WFBN had made for syndicated programming.

After the Federal Communications Commission approved Grant's purchase of WFBN in November 1985, the station changed its call letters to WGBO-TV on January 4, 1986, adopting "Super 66" as its on-air branding. Although not dramatically different overall, in January 1986, WGBO added a few more off-network sitcoms, a limited number of children's programs, and several western series to its schedule, as well as daily simulcasts of CNN Headline News. Even though the station lucked into a modicum of success with the Ramblers, Chicago proved to be the toughest market of any in which Grant operated. Its stations in Philadelphia (WGBS-TV) and Miami (WBFS-TV) were third independents in their respective markets, but WGBO-TV was the fourth independent in Chicago behind the established WGN-TV, WFLD, and WPWR-TV. It was also a noted free-spender, entering the market with a massive advertising blitz that prompted some of those competitors to increase their own marketing spending. By late 1986, rapidly rising costs for programming left Grant badly overextended. It filed for Chapter 11 bankruptcy on December 8, 1986, in an attempt to protect itself from its creditors. Bankruptcy court statements revealed WGBO-TV to be the biggest money-loser in the Grant portfolio, having lost $13.76 million for 1986 compared to $9.72 million for the Philadelphia station and $6.54 million at the Miami outlet; that year, the company as a whole lost $35.96 million.

In a March 1987 bankruptcy court proceeding in Philadelphia, Grant was allowed to continue operating its stations until at least July 1 through cash and accounts receivable to fund operations, denying a motion by the company's creditors to assume control of the stations or force their sale. However, on July 7, Grant agreed to enter into receivership and turn over control of the company and its three stations to its television program suppliers and bondholders under a reorganization plan—which was formally filed on October 13 and approved on March 30, 1988—to repay $420 million in debt from the stations' operations by 1995, at which point the stations would be sold off. In July 1988, Combined Broadcasting, a creditor-controlled company, took over Grant and the three stations. For the next five years, WGBO subsisted on reruns, infomercials, and a variety of local programs of secondary interest: local religious programs (including the Catholic Mass) dropped by WGN-TV, a country music video show from radio station WUSN, the Hoosier Millionaire lottery game show in Indiana, and University of Illinois and syndicated Big Ten Conference college basketball.

After Time Warner announced the launch of The WB on November 2, 1993, the network had entered into discussions with WGBO to become the network's Chicago affiliate. Even though Tribune Broadcasting would hold a partial ownership interest in The WB and tapped its independent stations in other markets to serve as the network's charter affiliates, WGN-TV was not initially expected to affiliate because of its national superstation feed and extensive sports programming, and network president Jamie Kellner told Electronic Media that The WB was more likely to be seen in Chicago on WGBO. WGN-TV reversed course on December 3 in a deal that also resulted in its superstation feed carrying the network nationally to areas without WB stations.

Meanwhile, Combined put WGBO and its other stations up for sale in 1993, with a reported asking price of $100 million for channel 66; four buyers were said to have toured the station. WBFS-TV in Miami went up for sale as well, and a report in Miami noted interest from Chris-Craft Industries, which had apparently attempted to negotiate a $90 million purchase of both outlets. Broadcasting & Cable magazine reported industry speculation that Univision was among the interested buyers.

=== Univision ownership ===
Univision's interest in WGBO stemmed from its unusual arrangement in Chicago. Its schedule was partially cleared by a longtime independent and ethnic station, WCIU-TV (channel 26). While the station had shifted its weekday ethnic programming off its lineup to focus on Spanish-language shows, in the daytime hours, it continued to air the Stock Market Observer, an English-language business news programming block before 3:30 p.m. each weekday, and some shows in other languages still aired on weekends. Univision wanted a full-time affiliate in the nation's third-largest market (and fifth-largest Hispanic TV market), leading it to scout out and then enter into negotiations to purchase WGBO-TV, even though that station was no longer seeking a buyer.

In January 1994, Univision announced that it would purchase WGBO from Combined for $35 million and move its programming there. While the deal included most of WGBO's non-license assets such as its studio facilities, transmission equipment and transmitter, it excluded its English-language programming inventory. The purchase was finalized on May 13. In August 1994, Combined Broadcasting subsequently announced that it would sell its other two stations, WGBS and WBFS-TV, to the Paramount Stations Group for $165 million.

In August 1994, Univision officially assumed ownership of WGBO. However, Univision's part-time affiliation agreement with WCIU did not expire until December 31, 1994; as a result, Univision continued to run WGBO as an English-language independent for five months until the contract with WCIU expired. On January 1, 1995, WGBO switched to Spanish-language programming, giving Univision a full-time presence in the market for the first time since 1989, when the network disaffiliated from WSNS-TV to return to WCIU. Most of WGBO's syndicated inventory, as well as Hoosier Millionaire, was picked up by a new independent station in Hammond, Indiana, WJYS, while the Catholic Mass moved to WEHS-TV.

Though WSNS had been a Spanish-language station for a decade when WGBO converted to Univision, channel 66 immediately took the ratings lead. By November 1996, its audience among Hispanics tripled that of WSNS.

== News operation ==
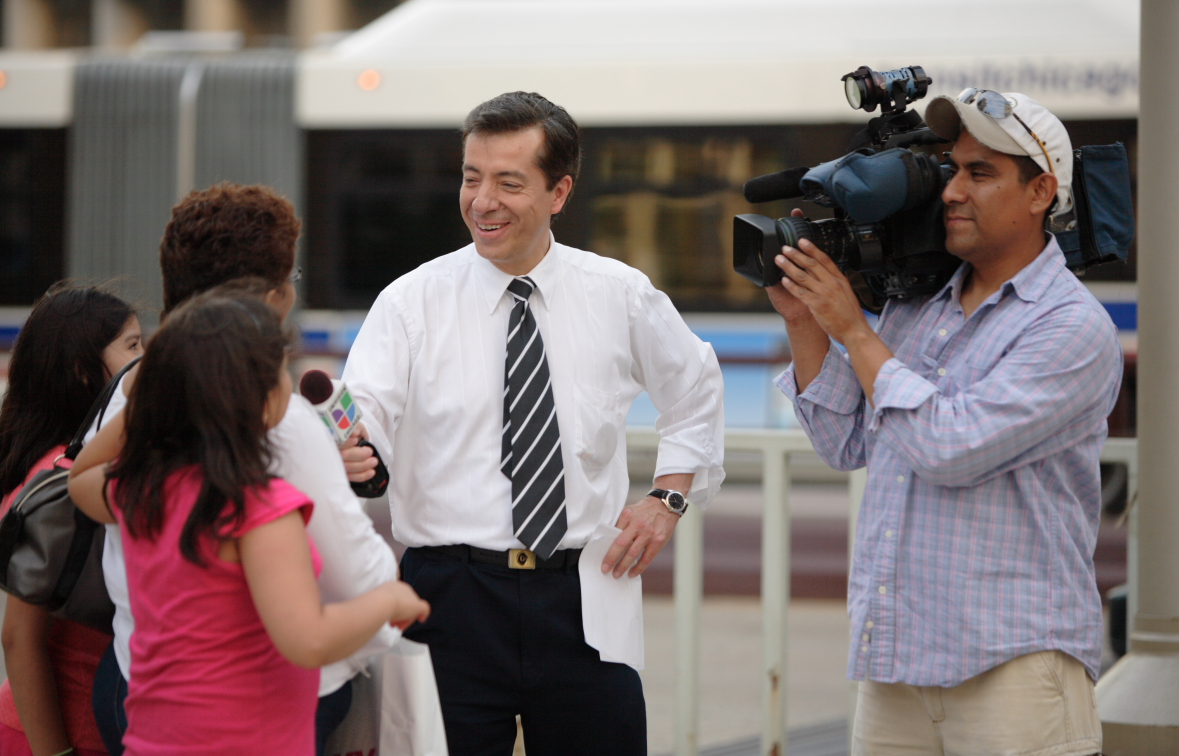
A WGBO news crew on the streets of Chicago

Upon switching to Univision on January 1, 1995, WGBO launched a news department and began producing local Spanish-language newscasts at 5 and 10 p.m., hiring former KVEA news director Jacqueline Gallardo for the same post in Chicago. The original newscasts were produced from a studio at WTTW, with the early-evening broadcast originally anchored by Elio Montenegro and Edna Schmidt, and Jorge Barbosa serving as anchor of the 10 p.m. newscast. On January 4, 2012, WGBO began broadcasting its local newscasts in high definition.

After adding a midday newscast in 2018, on January 21, 2019, the station premiered a two-hour local morning newscast on weekdays, Primera Hora, leading into the national morning show Despierta América. Univision billed the program as being Chicago's first local, Spanish-language morning newscast. It was the second attempt at such for WGBO, which had also produced a morning show in 2001.

In 2019, WGBO partnered with The Chicago Reporter to create Latinext, a multiplatform bilingual newsroom focusing on the Hispanic community in Chicago.

== Technical information ==
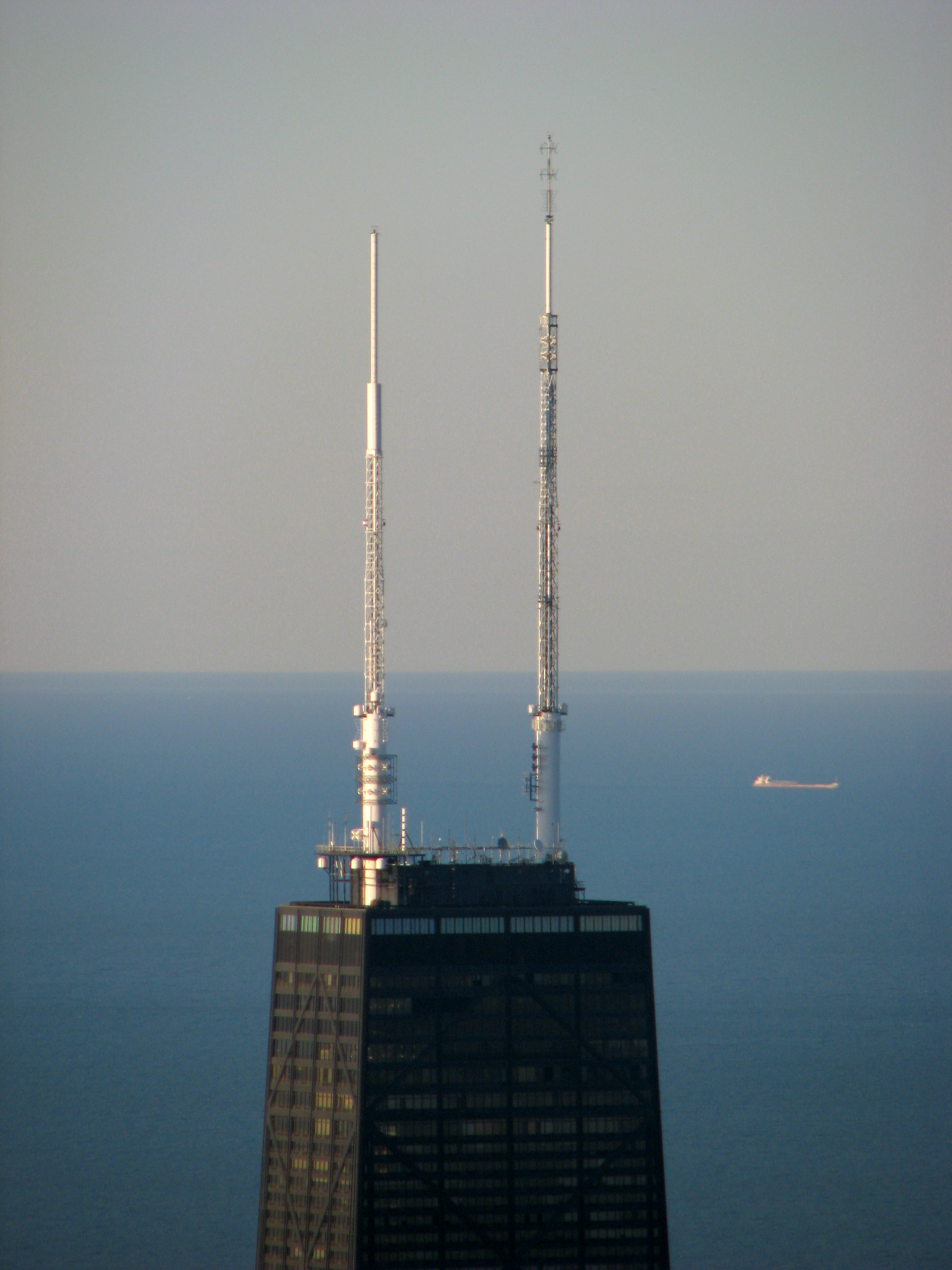
WGBO-DT is broadcast from the west mast of the John Hancock Center, seen here in 2009

WGBO is the only full-power TV station to use the John Hancock Center site full-time; six other low-power TV multiplexes and several backup FM facilities are also on the west mast, and four full-power Chicago TV stations use the east mast in a backup capacity.

=== Subchannels ===
The station's signal is multiplexed:

Subchannels of WGBO-DT
| Subchannel | Res. | Short name | Programming |
|---|---|---|---|
| 66.1 | 720p | WGBO–DT | Univision |
| 66.2 | 480i | MSGold | MovieSphere Gold |
| 66.3 | 480i | GET | Great (4:3) |
| 66.4 | 480i | Crime | True Crime Network |
| 66.5 | 480i | GRIT | Grit |
| 2.2 | 480i | StartTV | Start TV (WBBM-TV) (4:3) |
| 2.5 | 480i | Comet | Comet (WBBM-TV) (4:3) |

Broadcast on behalf of another station

Subchannel broadcast with MPEG-4 video

=== Analog-to-digital transition ===
WGBO shut down its analog signal, over UHF channel 66, on June 12, 2009, the official date on which full-power television stations in the United States transitioned from analog to digital broadcasts under federal mandate. The station moved its digital signal from its pre-transition UHF channel 53 to UHF channel 38 for post-transition operations.
