= Office Pirates =

US website focused on satirical humor

Office Pirates was a website for young men focused on mainly satirical humor, as it relates to corporate America, a "daily blend of funny videos, strange news and downloads, rolled up in an office-themed wrapper". The site was under the ownership of Time Inc in New York City, New York. The operation was run by Mark Golin, formerly of Maxim Magazine and Details Magazine. The website featured videos, blogs, pictures and articles related to the life of young male office dwellers. The site received international attention on its launch on February 22, 2006, but it was closed down seven months later, reportedly due to an audience too small to show up on Nielsen//NetRatings or Media Metrix web ratings.

The website was considered a surprisingly anti-corporate direction for Time Inc. Business Week called it Time's "newest and strangest launch" and another reviewer calling it "bizarre and freakish and entirely un-Time Inc". Reportedly, some of the videos on Office Pirates were filmed at the Time Inc headquarters in Manhattan.

The site was launched quietly with little promotion, hoping for word-of-mouth appeal. It had a staff of five full-time staffers and only two advertisers at launch. Presciently, Business Week pointed out that the site's low cost launch would result in "quick profit, or a fast exit". The target demographic for the site was young men aged 21–34, procrastinating at work.

On Friday, August 24, 2006, Office Pirates abruptly announced that its typical update of a "Last Thought of the Day" for that date would indeed be its "Last Thought...Ever" and hence its last update of any form on the website, including the user submitted Jokes, the "Hate Nook," the "What's for Lunch," and the "Biggest Jackass" submissions. The site was shut down September 1, 2006, with the site redirecting visitors to the Sports Illustrated website.

In a memo to Time Inc. staffers, Interactive president Ned Desmond wrote, 'Office Pirates was off to a good start – and it is likely to reach nearly 11 million page views this month – but the business still faced a long road...Time Inc. will return to online humor early next year with a new initiative from Sports Illustrated.' Time's CEO Ann Moore said that Office Pirates wasn't doing badly, but was killed because it was never going to be really big. She views Office Pirates as an illustration that companies should take risks and shouldn't be afraid to fail.
