= WXFT-DT =

Television station in Aurora, Illinois

- Aurora–Chicago, Illinois; United States
- City: Aurora, Illinois
- Channels: Digital: 22 (UHF), shared with WLS-TV; Virtual: 60
- Branding: UniMás Chicago

Programming
- Affiliations: 60.1: UniMás; 60.2: Ion Mystery; 60.3: Quest

Ownership
- Owner: TelevisaUnivision; (UniMas Chicago LLC)
- Sister stations: WGBO-DT, WOJO, WPPN, WVIV-FM

History
- First air date: April 20, 1982
- Former call signs: WBBS-TV / WPWR-TV (1982–1987); WEHS (1987–1992); WEHS-TV (1992–2001); WXFT (2001–2003); WXFT-TV (2004–2009)
- Former channel numbers: Analog: 60 (UHF, 1982–2009); Digital: 59 (UHF, 2006–2009), 50 (UHF, 2009–2017), 44 (UHF, 2017–2019)
- Former affiliations: Spanish Ind. (1982–1987); HSN (1987–2002)
- Call sign meaning: C("X")hicago/Xtreme Telefutura (WCFT was already in use at the time of assignment)

Technical information
- Licensing authority: FCC
- Facility ID: 60539
- ERP: 1,000 kW
- HAAT: 518 m (1,699 ft)
- Transmitter coordinates: 41°52′44″N 87°38′8″W

Links
- Public license information: Public file; LMS
- Website: UniMás

WXFT-DT (channel 60) is a television station licensed to Aurora, Illinois, United States, serving as the Chicago-area outlet for the Spanish-language network UniMás. It is owned and operated by TelevisaUnivision alongside Joliet-licensed Univision station WGBO-DT (channel 66). The two stations share studios at 541 North Fairbanks Court in the Streeterville neighborhood. Through a channel sharing agreement with ABC owned-and-operated station WLS-TV (channel 7), WXFT-DT transmits using WLS-TV's spectrum from an antenna atop the Willis Tower.

== History ==
=== Prior history of channel 60 in Chicago ===
The UHF channel 60 allocation to Aurora was originally occupied by WLXT-TV, which broadcast from May 16, 1969, to July 17, 1970. WLXT was an independent station that abruptly closed after 14 months of attempting to serve its suburban coverage area, but it was notable for the people that passed through it, particularly news director Christine Lund, who became a well-known news anchor in Los Angeles, and Tom Skilling, longtime chief meteorologist at WGN-TV (channel 9), who got his start in television broadcasting at WLXT and presented daily weather forecasts for the station during his junior year of high school.

=== WPWR-TV/WBBS-TV timeshare ===
When applications for channel 60 were reopened in 1978, considerable interest was attracted. Several applicants proposed a new Spanish-language television station, including the Spanish International Network (which ended up applying for channel 66 instead) and a local group headed by Marcelino Miyares, the owner of Spanish-language advertising agency OMAR. The Miyares group became known as Hispanic American Television–Chicago and eventually HATCO-60 when it merged with competing applicant Aurora-Chicago Telecasters, Inc. The FCC received five proposals, three of which were designated for hearing by the FCC in July 1980: HATCO-60 (specifying West Chicago); Metrowest Corporation, specifying Aurora; and the College of DuPage, for Glen Ellyn.

In late 1981, HATCO-60 and Metrowest agreed to a shared-time agreement. Under the agreement, Metrowest would broadcast daily from 2:30 a.m. to 7 p.m., while the Hatco-60 station would broadcast daily from 7 p.m. to 2:30 a.m., giving channel 60 the distinction of being the only split-licensed station in the United States (and the first to operate in more than 20 years).

With the arrangement in place, the two stations signed on in April 1982, sharing transmitter facilities atop the Sears Tower. Eychaner signed on independent station WPWR-TV.

At the same time WPWR debuted, Miyares signed on WBBS-TV—the call sign assigned by the Federal Communications Commission (FCC) over objections from WBBM-TV—which maintained a Spanish-language entertainment format as a founding affiliate of NetSpan, which would evolve into Telemundo in 1987. WBBS featured various programming aimed at Hispanic audiences including local news programming, telenovelas and variety series as well as other locally produced shows, such as the popular music video program Imagen, hosted by local Spanish-language television personality (and now media executive) Rey Mena and Vivianne Plazas. One of the notable events for WBBS occurred in 1983, when the station introduced the Latin teen pop group Menudo (which included a young Ricky Martin), to Chicago's Latino community. The station's primary competitor was WCIU-TV (channel 26, now a CW affiliate), which was then a part-time affiliate of the Spanish International Network (the forerunner to the present-day Univision).

Both stations shared one critical piece of programming: a new subscription television service called SportsVision (a companion service to ON TV), which Eychaner and Miyares had developed through a deal with Chicago White Sox co-owners Jerry Reinsdorf and Eddie Einhorn. In order to access the service, viewers had to purchase a set-top descrambling converter and pay a monthly subscription fee in order to view sporting events such as White Sox games. However, SportsVision achieved little success on WPWR/WBBS-TV and converted into a cable channel in January 1984. With SportsVision removed from the station, WPWR ran public domain movies, cartoons and classic sitcoms from the early to mid-1950s to fill its schedule. In 1984, more popular classic sitcoms and newer barter cartoons were mixed into the lineup.

In 1984, Eychaner acquired the construction permit for WDAI, a proposed station that would be licensed to Gary, Indiana and broadcast on UHF channel 56, for $1.5 million. The permit had been held by a group of Indiana businessmen doing business as GWWX-TV and later Great Lakes Broadcasting. The WDAI construction permit had existed since 1982, but short-spacing concerns to channel 60 and to two allocations in southeast Wisconsin had meant channel 56 could not be placed on the Sears Tower; this finding crippled a previous attempt to build the allocation as WGMI in 1968. However, another channel allocated to Gary could: channel 50, which as educational station WCAE had folded the previous year due to financial problems. The license was transferred to Northwest Indiana Public Broadcasting, but NIPB was not able to reactivate the station from improved facilities without an infusion of resources. Eychaner paid $684,000 to Northwest Indiana Public Broadcasting, giving it the funding it needed to build its facility, if it would switch allocations with WDAI. The move had been initially designed to potentially allow WBBS-TV to go full-time on channel 60, but the loss of NetSpan affiliation doomed those plans. In August 1986, the commission issued final orders switching the commercial and noncommercial allocations for Gary. This allowed Metrowest to proceed with its plan of moving the WPWR-TV intellectual unit from channel 60 to channel 50 while selling the channel 60 license; the noncommercial allocation shifted to channel 56, which signed on as WYIN on November 15, 1987.

=== HSN/USA Networks ownership ===
In the spring of 1985, WSNS-TV (channel 44) ended its five-year run as an affiliate of the ON TV subscription service and announced that it would affiliate with SIN. In response to losing access to SIN programming, WCIU chose to align with NetSpan, which in turn sent WBBS-TV into a tailspin. In October 1985, Eychaner purchased a financially struggling WBBS-TV for $11 million. At that moment, WPWR took over the weekday hours held by WBBS; channel 60 continued to broadcast on weekend evenings until August 1986, when the sale was approved. Channel 50 was ready to sign on as a commercial outlet by October 1986, at which point Eychaner then sold the channel 60 allocation to the Home Shopping Network for $25 million. HSN, which owned the station through its Silver King Television arm, changed the station's call letters to WEHS (originally planned to be changed to WHSI). WPWR moved to channel 50 on January 17, 1987, at which time the channel 60 signed on as an HSN owned-and-operated station, with its only diversions from the master HSN schedule being the minimum fulfillment of local and educational programming requirements.

WXFT logo, used from January 14, 2002, to January 6, 2013.

Barry Diller—then-owner of USA Network—acquired Silver King Communications in November 1995; the sale was finalized on December 19, 1996, ten months after its March 11 approval by the FCC. By 1998, the company rebranded as USA Broadcasting after merging with the TV assets of Universal Pictures. In 1999, USA Broadcasting began converting its stations into a general entertainment independent format called "CityVision" and WEHS was slated to convert to this format infusing locally produced and syndicated programming along with live sports content; with the station likely to have become "Windy 60" under new WNDE calls (both referencing Chicago's nickname, "The Windy City")

=== Univision Communications ownership ===
However, before the proposed conversion into an independent station could occur, the plans were put on ice after USA Broadcasting announced that it would sell off its television station group in 2000. One of the two prospective buyers for the group was The Walt Disney Company (had Disney's bid been successful, it would have created the market's first television duopoly with ABC owned-and-operated station WLS-TV); however, Disney was outbid by Spanish-language broadcaster Univision Communications, which purchased the USA Broadcasting stations for $1.1 billion on December 7, 2000; the sale was finalized on May 21, 2001. As a result, channel 60 changed its call letters to WXFT, and became a charter owned-and-operated station of Univision's new 2nd network, Telefutura (later rebranded to UniMás), when that network launched on January 14, 2002.

WXFT's 5,000,000-watt transmitter malfunctioned in the early hours of December 6, 2006, causing an alarm which forced action by the Chicago Fire Department to extinguish the smoldering equipment. The transmitter was destroyed, leaving only half of its power available. The station still remained available via cable fed via a direct connection from the station. A new transmitter was commissioned on January 11, 2007, which restored normal operations.

WXFT shut down its analog signal, over UHF channel 60, on June 12, 2009, the official deadline for full-power television stations in the United States to convert from full-time analog to full-time digital broadcasts under federal mandate. The station's digital signal moved from its pre-transition UHF channel 59 to channel 50, using virtual channel 60.

In December 2009, WXFT and sister station WGBO, along with most of Univision's other owned-and-operated stations, upgraded their main digital channels to transmit in 16:9 1080i high definition in preparation for the launches of Univision and Telefutura's HD feeds which launched in 2010.

On April 13, 2017, station owner Univision Communications announced the over-the-air spectrum of WXFT-DT was sold in the FCC's spectrum reallocation auction for $126.1 million. In January 2016, the ABC Owned Television Stations group, owners of WLS-TV announced they will enter into a channel sharing agreement with Univision for WXFT. While WXFT-DT did not go off the air, it began to share spectrum with WLS-TV in June 2017.

== Subchannels ==
Subchannels of WLS-TV and WXFT-DT
License	Subchannel	Res.	Short name	Programming
WLS-TV	7.1	720p	WLS-HD	ABC
WLS-TV	7.2	480i	LOCLish	Localish
WLS-TV	7.3	480i	CHARGE	Charge!
WXFT-DT	60.1	720p	WXFT-DT	UniMás
WXFT-DT	60.2	480i	ION MYS	Ion Mystery
WXFT-DT	60.3	480i	Quest	Quest
