= Time-Life Building (disambiguation) =

Time-Life Building may refer to:

- 1 Rockefeller Plaza, New York City, completed 1939, Time, Inc. offices 1938–1960
- 1271 Avenue of the Americas, New York City, completed 1960, Time, Inc. offices 1960–2014
- Time-Life Building (Chicago), completed 1969

== See also ==
- Time-Life Screen, an architectural sculpture in Mayfair, London, England
