= WPPN =

Radio station in Des Plaines, Illinois

- Des Plaines, Illinois; United States
- Broadcast area: Chicago, Illinois
- Frequency: 106.7 MHz (HD Radio)
- Branding: Amor 106.7

Programming
- Language: Spanish
- Format: Adult contemporary
- Subchannels: HD2: TUDN Radio

Ownership
- Owner: Uforia Audio Network; (Univision Radio Illinois, Inc.)
- Sister stations: WGBO-DT; WOJO; WVIV-FM; WXFT-DT

History
- First air date: December 3, 1971
- Former call signs: WYEN (1971-1986); WZRC (1986–1987); WTWV (1987–1989); WYLL (1989–2000); WYLL-FM (2000–2001); WZFS (2001–2004)

Technical information
- Licensing authority: FCC
- Facility ID: 25053
- Class: B
- ERP: 50,000 watts
- HAAT: 129 meters (423 ft)
- Translator: 106.9 W295CG (Lake Bluff)

Links
- Public license information: Public file; LMS
- Webcast: Listen live
- Website: univision.com/radio/chicago-wppn-fm/amor-106-7-fm

WPPN (106.7 FM) is a radio station licensed to Des Plaines, Illinois, that targets the Chicago metropolitan area. WPPN broadcasts a Spanish AC format. WPPN is owned by TelevisaUnivision through its Uforia Audio Network subsidiary. The station's studios are located at 625 North Michigan Avenue in downtown Chicago, and its transmitter is located in Arlington Heights.

Due to WPPN's 50,000-watt signal and north suburban location, it can be heard through much of the Rockford area and southeastern Wisconsin. It also broadcasts in the HD Radio (hybrid) format.

WPPN is also the affiliate station for the Chicago Cubs, through HD Radio (on HD2 as TUDN Radio Chicago)

== History ==
=== Request Radio ===
The station began broadcasting December 3, 1971, holding the call sign WYEN. The station was owned by Walt-West Enterprises. WYEN aired an all-request format branded "Request Radio", playing music requested by listeners. Contemporary and middle of the road music was played on the station.

"Request Radio" continued airing on the station through the mid–1980s. In 1986, the station was sold to Flint Metro Mass Media for $8 million.

=== Z Rock ===
On September 1, the station's call sign was changed to WZRC, and the station adopted a hard rock/heavy metal format, becoming the first affiliate of the syndicated Z Rock network.

=== The Wave ===
On October 16, 1987, the station's call sign was changed to WTWV, and the station adopted a new-age/smooth jazz/soft rock format as "The Wave". The station was an affiliate of the Satellite Music Network, with programming originating on KTWV in Los Angeles.

=== WYLL (1989-2001) ===
In 1989, the station was sold to Salem Communications for $9,250,000, and the station adopted a Christian contemporary music format, with its call sign being changed to WYLL. However, the format was short-lived, as Salem gradually replaced the Christian contemporary music with Christian talk programming.

By 1991, Christian contemporary music was mostly relegated to weekends. Christian talk and teaching programs heard on WYLL included shows hosted by Alistair Begg, Chuck Swindoll, Adrian Rogers, Chuck Smith, Beverly LaHaye, Jay Sekulow, James Dobson, Hank Hanegraaff, Janet Parshall, and Sandy Rios. As a Christian talk and teaching station, WYLL was branded "Your Station For Life" and later "Chicago's Word".

In 2000, Salem acquired WXRT 1160 (formerly known as WJJD) for $29 million. In February 2001, Salem moved the Christian talk programming of WYLL to 1160, along with the WYLL call letters.

=== WZFS (2001-2004) ===
Logo as "The Fish"

With the move of WYLL to 1160, 106.7's call sign was temporarily changed to WYLL-FM. On March 2, 2001, the station adopted Christian contemporary format branded "106.7 The Fish", with the slogan "Safe for the Whole Family". The station was launched with "40 days and 40 nights" of commercial free music. Shortly thereafter, the station's call sign was changed to WZFS. "The Fish" branding, a reference to the ichthys used in the station's logo, was also used by Salem for Christian contemporary stations in other markets, such as Atlanta, on WFSH-FM 104.7, and Los Angeles, on 95.9 KFSH-FM.

In 2004, Salem agreed to trade WZFS and KSFB 100.7 (now KVVZ) in the San Francisco area to Univision in exchange for KOBT 100.7 in the Houston area (now KKHT-FM), KHCK 1480 in Dallas (now KNGO), KOSL-FM 94.3 in Sacramento (now KGRB), and 560 WIND in Chicago.

=== WPPN (2004-present) ===
On November 1, 2004, at midnight, after playing "Remember Me" by Mark Schultz, WZFS signed off with sounds of water. After a brief period of dead air, Univision took control and launched a Spanish-language adult contemporary format on the station, branded "Pasion 106.7". The station's call sign was changed to WPPN shortly thereafter.

In October 2005, Univision tweaked the music blend of WPPN, but left the name and the personalities of "Pasion" in place, with the station shifting to a Spanish oldies/adult hits format.

On January 28, 2009, sister station WVIV-FM changed its format to Spanish oldies and WPPN adopted a Spanish CHR/Hurban format as "La Kalle".

On July 1, 2011, WPPN changed their format back to Spanish adult contemporary, and re-branded as "Pasion 106.7", while the previous "La Kalle" format moved to WVIV-FM 103.1 FM/WVIX 93.5 FM.

In March 2014, WPPN rebranded as "Amor 106.7".

== Translator ==
Call sign	Frequency	City of license	FID	ERP (W)	Class	Transmitter coordinates	FCC info
W295CG	106.9 FM	Lake Bluff, Illinois	141545	250	D	42°8′14.1″N 87°58′57.3″W	LMS
