= WOJO =

Regional Mexican radio station in Evanston, Illinois

- Evanston, Illinois; United States
- Broadcast area: Chicago metropolitan area
- Frequency: 105.1 MHz (HD Radio)
- Branding: Que Buena 105.1

Programming
- Language: Spanish
- Format: Regional Mexican
- Subchannels: HD2: South Asian "Radio Zindagi"; HD3: Spanish CHR (WVIV-FM) simulcast

Ownership
- Owner: Uforia Audio Network; (Tichenor License Corporation)
- Sister stations: WPPN; WVIV-FM; WXFT-DT; WGBO-DT

History
- First air date: February 1947
- Former call signs: WEAW (1947–1953); WEAW-FM (1953–1972)
- Former frequencies: 104.3 MHz (1947); 96.7 MHz (1947–1948)

Technical information
- Licensing authority: FCC
- Facility ID: 67073
- Class: B
- ERP: 5,700 watts
- HAAT: 425 meters (1,394 ft)
- Transmitter coordinates: 41°53′56.1″N 87°37′23.2″W

Links
- Public license information: Public file; LMS
- Webcast: Listen live
- Website: www.univision.com/radio/chicago-wojo-fm/que-buena-105-1-fm

WOJO (105.1 FM) is a radio station broadcasting a regional Mexican format. Licensed to Evanston, Illinois, United States, the station serves the Chicago area. The station is currently owned by TelevisaUnivision, via its division Uforia Audio Network through licensee Tichenor License Corporation.

WOJO's studios are located at 541 N. Fairbanks Ct, Suite 1100, Chicago, and its transmitter is located atop the John Hancock Center.

WOJO is also the affiliate station for the Chicago Fire MLS team, through its Sister Station (WPPN-HD2) and on the Uforia App.

== History ==
=== WEAW ===
The station began broadcasting in February 1947, and held the call sign WEAW. The station was owned by North Shore Broadcasting, and its call sign stood for its president Edward A. Wheeler.

The station broadcast on 104.3 MHz briefly in 1947, before moving to 96.7 MHz later that year. The station's transmitter was located in Evanston and it had an ERP of 665 watts. In 1948, the station's frequency was changed to 105.1 MHz and its ERP was increased to 36,000 watts at a HAAT of 240 feet. The call sign officially became WEAW-FM in 1953 when a companion AM station was launched. In 1961, the station's ERP was increased to 180,000 watts. In 1970, the station's transmitter was moved to the top of the new John Hancock Center in Chicago, with its ERP reduced to 6,000 watts.

Among the music heard on WEAW was light music, easy listening, classical music, and show tunes. The station also carried programs from local schools, community organizations, and Northwestern University. The station also broadcast background music to stores and other businesses, with ads removed for subscribers. By 1964, all of its subscription services had been moved to subcarriers.

From 1947 through the 1960s, WEAW broadcast Northwestern Wildcats football games. It was also the flagship station of the Chicago White Sox radio network in 1971 and 1972.

=== WOJO ===
By late 1972, most of the station's programming was in Spanish, and in December 1972, its callsign was changed to WOJO.

In 1986, WOJO was sold to Tichenor Media for $1.4 million. In 1997, Tichenor Media merged with Heftel Broadcasting to form the Hispanic Broadcasting Corporation, which merged with Univision Communications in 2004.

In 2025, WOJO also became the affiliate station for the Chicago Fire MLS team

== Translators ==
Broadcast translators for WOJO-HD2
Call sign	Frequency	City of license	FID	ERP (W)	Class	Transmitter coordinates	FCC info
W236CF	95.1 FM	Chicago, Illinois	140658	60	D	41°52′44.1″N 87°38′8.2″W	LMS
W236CG	95.1 FM	Bolingbrook, Illinois	140691	250	D	41°55′36.1″N 87°48′24.2″W	LMS
W280EM	103.9 FM	Chicago, Illinois	140763	17	D	41°53′56.1″N 87°37′23.2″W	LMS
