= WPNA-FM =

Polish music radio station in Evanston–Chicago, Illinois

- Evanston, Illinois; United States
- Broadcast area: Chicago metropolitan area
- Frequency: 103.1 MHz
- Branding: WPNA 103.1 FM

Programming
- Language: Polish
- Format: Contemporary hit radio

Ownership
- Owner: The Polish National Alliance; (Alliance Radio, LLC)

History
- First air date: August 15, 1963
- Former call signs: WEEF-FM (1963–1973); WVVX-FM (1973–1977); WVVX (1977–1998); WXXY-FM (1998–2003); WVIV-FM (2003–2017); WVIX (2017)
- Call sign meaning: "Polish National Alliance"

Technical information
- Licensing authority: FCC
- Facility ID: 74177
- Class: A
- ERP: 6,000 watts
- HAAT: 91 meters (299 ft)
- Transmitter coordinates: 42°2′50″N 87°40′50″W

Links
- Public license information: Public file; LMS
- Website: wpna.fm

WPNA-FM (103.1 MHz) is a commercial FM radio station licensed to Evanston, Illinois, and serving the Chicago metropolitan area. It is owned by The Polish National Alliance, through licensee Alliance Radio, LLC. It airs a mix of Polish and International contemporary hits.

WPNA-FM has an effective radiated power (ERP) of 6,000 watts. The transmitter is atop the Bank One Building in Evanston.

== History ==
=== MOR era ===
The construction permit for the 103.1 FM frequency was issued to North Suburban Radio on November 23, 1960, bearing the call sign WHPK (soon changed to WNSH-FM). The station's transmitter was located in Deerfield, Illinois, with an ERP of 1,000 watts at a HAAT of 120 feet (37 m), and its community of license was Highland Park, Illinois. By the time the station came on the air, its call sign was changed to WEEF-FM.

The station began broadcasting August 15, 1963, simulcasting with AM 1430 WEEF. WEEF's call sign stood for "Eli E. Fink", the station's original owner. Both stations aired a middle-of-the-road (MOR) format. In December 1967, both stations were sold to Unique Radio for $350,000.

=== Progressive rock era ===
In July 1972, both stations changed formats to progressive rock. Among the air personalities during this time were Ed Walker, Dale Scott, Lori Rhinegold, Paul Knutson, and Mike Megaris. Both stations were sold to Vanguard Communications for $290,000 in spring of 1973, and the station's call sign was changed to WVVX-FM. In 1975, the station's ERP was increased to 3,000 watts and its HAAT was increased to 150 feet (46 m).

=== Brokered programming ===
By 1977, the station had adopted a brokered ethnic format, airing a high amount of German language programming. In autumn 1977, the station was sold to Universal Broadcasting for $183,750. By 1979 the station was primarily airing oldies music, along with some religious and ethnic programming.

In 1982, the station's transmitter was moved to Highland Park, Illinois, and its HAAT was increased to 245 feet (75 m).

Throughout the 1980s and until 1998, the station aired brokered ethnic programming, along with a few religious programs. On May 11, 1985, the station began airing the heavy metal/hard rock program Real Precious Metal overnights. The station continued airing Real Precious Metal until 1993, when the program moved to 107.9 WYSY.

In 1992, the station was sold to Douglas Broadcasting for $3.7 million.

=== Big City Radio ownership ===
In 1997, WVVX was sold to Big City Radio for $9.5 million. Big City Radio also purchased another station on 103.1, WJDK in Morris, Illinois (now WCSJ-FM). In February 1998, the station's call sign was changed to WXXY, and the two stations adopted a rhythmic oldies format known as "Chicago's Heart and Soul".

Logo as The Eighties Channel

In 1999, the station's transmitter was moved to Arlington Heights, Illinois, and its ERP was increased to 6,000 watts at a HAAT of 100 meters (330 ft).

Citing difficulties in competing with WUBT "103.5 The Beat", which had recently switched to a rhythmic oldies format, the station changed formats on August 6, 1999. WXXY and WYXX adopted an 1980s hits format as "The Eighties Channel", with the station patterned on high-energy CHR stations of the 1980s. The first song was "Video Killed the Radio Star" by The Buggles. The station featured longtime Chicago area radio personalities including Robert Murphy, Fred Winston, and Mark Zander.

=== Spanish language era ===
In November 2000, Chicago's 94.7 FM adopted a 1980s music format as WZZN "The Zone", which prompted WXXY to change formats. On January 29, 2001, after playing "Never Say Goodbye" by Bon Jovi, WXXY/WYXX adopted a Spanish hits format, branded as "Viva 103.1". The station's simulcast with 103.1 WYXX in Morris was ended by January 2003, with WYXX adopting a dance hits format as "Party 103.1". On January 12, 2003, WXXY began to be simulcast on AM 1200 WLXX. On January 16, WXXY's call sign was changed to WVIV-FM, while 1200 WLXX's call sign was changed to WVIV. The simulcast on AM 1200 ended in October 2003.

In summer 2003, the station was sold to Hispanic Broadcasting Corporation for $32.9 million. Shortly thereafter, Hispanic Broadcasting Corporation purchased adult-contemporary station WJTW 93.5 ("Star 93.5") in Joliet and it began simulcasting WVIV-FM, with its call sign being changed to WVIX.

In July 2005, WVIV-FM/WVIX flipped formats to Hurban as "La Kalle".

In 2009, the WVIV-FM/WVIX simulcast adopted a Spanish oldies format branded "Recuerdo 103.1/93.5".

On July 1, 2011, the WVIV-FM/WVIX simulcast changed their format back to Hurban, branded as "La Kalle 103.1/93.5" after the format moved from WPPN 106.7 FM, which flipped to Spanish AC as "Pasion 106.7".

On December 12, 2011, the WVIV-FM/WVIX simulcast was rebranded as "Maxima 103.1/93.5", as its format shifted towards Spanish CHR. The station's branding would later be changed to "Latino Mix 103.1/93.5".

On May 25, 2017, Univision announced that 103.1 would break off the simulcast and be sold to Polish National Alliance for $5.5 million. A condition of the sale was 93.5 WVIX completing its move to the Oakbrook Terrace Tower, where it would operate with an ERP of 3.5 kW at an HAAT of 133 meters. On June 16, WVIV-FM and WVIX swapped calls.

=== WPNA-FM ===
The acquisition by The Polish National Alliance was consummated on August 31, and the station changed its call sign from WVIX to WPNA-FM. The station began airing a mix of Polish and international contemporary hits. In 2021, the station's transmitter was moved to Evanston. In 2025, the community of license was changed to Evanston.
