= WVIV-FM =

Radio station in Lemont–Chicago, Illinois

- Lemont, Illinois; United States
- Broadcast area: Chicago metropolitan area
- Frequency: 93.5 MHz
- Branding: Latino Mix 93.5

Programming
- Language: Spanish
- Format: Contemporary hit radio

Ownership
- Owner: Uforia Audio Network; (Univision Radio Illinois, Inc.)
- Sister stations: Radio: WOJO; WPPN; TV: WXFT-DT; WGBO-DT

History
- First air date: April 17, 1960 (as WAJP)
- Former call signs: WAJP (1960-1985); WJTW (1985–2003); WVIX (2003–2017)
- Call sign meaning: "Viva" (previous branding)

Technical information
- Licensing authority: FCC
- Facility ID: 48449
- Class: A
- ERP: 3,500 watts
- HAAT: 133 meters (436 ft)
- Transmitter coordinates: 41°51′30.1″N 87°57′16.2″W
- Repeater: 105.1 WOJO-HD3 (Evanston)

Links
- Public license information: Public file; LMS
- Webcast: Listen live
- Website: 935chicago.univision.com

WVIV-FM (93.5 MHz) is a commercial Spanish FM radio station licensed to Lemont, Illinois, serving the Chicago metropolitan area. It is owned by TelevisaUnivision. The station is a part of TelevisaUnivision's Uforia Audio Network brand. The station's studios are located at 625 North Michigan Avenue in downtown Chicago, and the transmitter is atop the Oakbrook Terrace Tower in Oakbrook Terrace, Illinois.

WVIV is also the affiliate station for the Chicago Bears team.

== History ==
=== WAJP ===
The station began broadcasting April 17, 1960, and originally held the call sign WAJP. The station was owned by Alfred J. Pohlers and Mary Jane Pohlers, and its call sign was based on Alfred J. Pohlers' initials. WAJP aired a beautiful music format, along with polka shows and other specialty programming blocks.

WAJP was originally licensed to Joliet, Illinois, and its studios and transmitter was located on Ruby Street in Joliet. The station had an ERP of 1,000 watts at a HAAT of 250 feet (76 m). In 1972, the station's ERP was increased to 3,000 watts and its HAAT was increased to 260 feet (79 m).

=== WJTW ===
In 1985, the station was sold to New Horizons Communications for $450,000. Shortly after the station was sold, its call sign was changed to WJTW and it adopted an adult contemporary format. The station continued to air an adult contemporary format until 2003. As an adult contemporary station, it was branded "Lite Hits", "Lucky 93.5", and finally "Star 93.5".

In 1995, the station was sold to Barden Broadcasting for 800,000. In 1998, the station was sold to Pride Communications. Later that year, the station's transmitter was moved to the east side of Joliet, near U.S. 6 and Draper Ave., and its HAAT was increased to 276 feet (84 m). In 2000, the station was sold to NextMedia Group.

=== Spanish language formats ===
In 2003, Hispanic Broadcasting Corporation purchased the station for $32 million. The station's call sign was changed to WVIX and it adopted a Spanish hits format branded "Viva", simulcasting 103.1 WVIV-FM in Highland Park, Illinois. Shortly thereafter, the station's transmitter was moved to Lockport, Illinois, near I-355 and 151st Street, and its ERP was increased to 6,000 watts at 100 meters (330 ft).

In July 2005, WVIV-FM/WVIX flipped formats to Hurban as "La Kalle".

In 2009, the WVIV-FM/WVIX simulcast adopted a Spanish oldies format branded "Recuerdo 103.1/93.5".

In 2011, the station's city of license was changed to Lemont, Illinois.

On July 1, 2011, the WVIV-FM/WVIX simulcast changed their format back to Hurban, branded as "La Kalle 103.1/93.5" after the format moved from WPPN 106.7 FM, which flipped to Spanish AC as "Pasion 106.7".

On December 12, 2011, the WVIV-FM/WVIX simulcast was rebranded as "Maxima 103.1/93.5", as its format shifted towards Spanish CHR. The station's branding would later be changed to "Latino Mix 103.1/93.5".

On May 25, 2017, Univision announced that 103.1 would break off the simulcast and be sold to Polish National Alliance for $5.5 million. A condition of the sale was 93.5 WVIX completing its move to the Oakbrook Terrace Tower, where it would operate with an ERP of 3.5 kW at an HAAT of 133 meters (436 ft). Shortly after the announcement of 103.1's sale, 93.5 completed its move to Oakbrook Terrace.

On June 16, 2017, WVIV-FM and WVIX swapped calls.
