= Maghound =

Maghound was an Internet-based magazine membership service developed by Time Inc. and branded as "the magazine lover's best friend." It was launched in 2008 to counter a decline in magazine sales at United States newsstands. The service was discontinued by Time Inc. on April 30, 2012.

== Service details ==
The website allowed users to order magazines of their choice; users could change which magazines they receive at any time, unlike conventional subscriptions. The membership service provided members the ability to manage their household's magazines from one online account. However, people who subscribed to magazines using Maghound did not receive premium content which publishers reserve for full subscribers, because sales to Maghound customers were reported as single-copy sales. Publishers received the addresses of Maghound users who buy their magazines, but they were not able to advertise to these customers.

Membership pricing was tiered - three magazines for $4.95 a month, five titles for $7.95, seven titles for $9.95, and $1.00 additional per title for eight titles or more. Approximately 10 percent of magazine titles available through this service included a small premium fee. Membership was available in the U.S. only.

On February 2, 2012, Time Inc. announced that Maghound will cease operations on April 30, 2012.

== Industry involvement ==
Maghound Enterprises., Inc., is a wholly owned subsidiary of Time Inc. and is headquartered at the Time-Life Building in New York City. The membership service was established in September 2008 and is currently operating in Beta mode. At the time of launch, MAGHOUND featured approximately 240 magazine titles from over 50 publishers, with plans to increase the list on an ongoing basis. It currently offers nearly 300 titles. In addition to all major Time Inc. brands, a partial list of participating publishers also includes: Rodale, Inc., Bonnier Group, Hearst Corporation, Hachette Filipacchi Médias, Martha Stewart Living Omnimedia, Meredith Corporation, and The Reader's Digest Association, among others.
