= Mangouin =

- Village
- Location in Ivory Coast
- Coordinates: 7°39′N 7°37′W
- Country: Ivory Coast
- District: Montagnes
- Region: Tonkpi
- Department: Biankouma
- Sub-prefecture: Biankouma
- Time zone: UTC+0 (GMT)

Mangouin is a village in western Ivory Coast. It is in the sub-prefecture of Biankouma, Biankouma Department, Tonkpi Region, Montagnes District.

Until 2012, Mangouin was in the commune of Mangouin-Yrongouin. In March 2012, Mangouin-Yrongouin became one of 1,126 communes nationwide that were abolished. Yrongouin is a smaller village one-and-a-half kilometres north of Mangouin.
