= Time Inc. =

American magazine publishing company

- Final logo by Siegel+Gale used from 1986 to 2018.

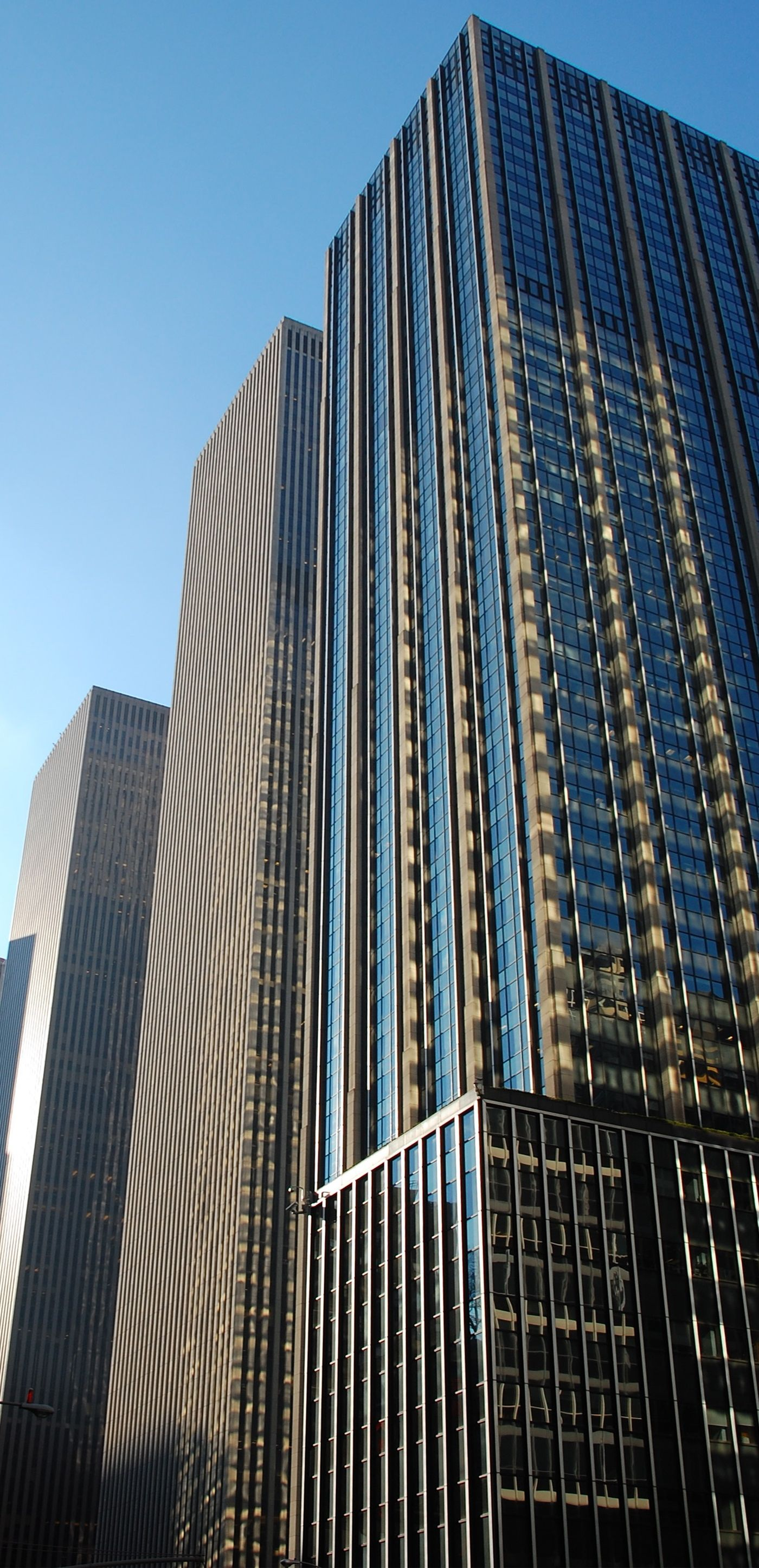
- The former Time & Life Building (now known as 1271 Avenue of the Americas)
- Type: Public
- Traded as: NYSE: TIME (until 1990, 2014–2018)
- Industry: Digital media; Publishing; Events
- Founded: November 28, 1922; 103 years ago June 6, 2014; 12 years ago (Spin-off)
- Founders: Henry Luce; Briton Hadden
- Defunct: January 31, 2018; 8 years ago (Spin-off)
- Fate: Merged with Warner Communications to form Time Warner; later spun off and acquired by Meredith Corporation which eventually merged with Dotdash to form Dotdash Meredith (now People Inc.) in 2021
- Successors: People Inc. Skydance
- Headquarters: 225 Liberty Street, New York City, U.S.
- Key people: Joseph A. Ripp (executive chairman); Rich Battista (president and CEO)
- Revenue: ▼US$3.1 billion (2015)
- Operating income: ▼ −US$823 million (2015)
- Net income: ▼ −US$881 million (2015)
- Total assets: ▼US$4.8 billion (2015)
- Total equity: ▼US$1.8 billion (2015)
- Owner: Time Warner (1990–2014)
- Number of employees: 7,200 (2016)
- Divisions: Time Inc. International; Time Inc. India
- Subsidiaries: HelloGiggles; Viant Technologies; Xumo (50%); Foundry; Fansided Network; Sports Illustrated Play

Time Inc. (also referred to as Time & Life, Inc. after its two former flagship magazines) was an American worldwide mass media corporation founded on November 28, 1922, by Henry Luce and Briton Hadden. Based in New York City, the company owned and published over 100 magazine brands, including its namesake Time, Sports Illustrated, Travel + Leisure, Food & Wine, Fortune, People, InStyle, Life, Golf Magazine, Southern Living, Essence, Real Simple, and Entertainment Weekly. It also operated subsidiaries alongside Time Inc. UK (later sold and rebranded as TI Media), whose major titles included What's on TV, NME, Country Life, and Wallpaper. Additionally, Time Inc. managed over 60 websites and digital-only titles, such as MyRecipes, Extra Crispy, TheSnug, HelloGiggles, and MIMI.

In 1990, Time Inc. merged with Warner Communications to form the media conglomerate Time Warner (later Warner Bros. Discovery and now Skydance), with Time Inc. continuing as a subsidiary. In 2014, to focus on its three entertainment divisions, Warner Bros., Turner, and HBO, Time Warner spun off Time Inc. as a public company trading on the New York Stock Exchange. In 2018, the Meredith Corporation acquired Time Inc. for $2.8 billion. Three years later, Meredith was acquired by IAC and merged with Dotdash to form Dotdash Meredith (now People Inc.), resulting in IAC gaining most of the former Time Inc. assets, notably excluding Time magazine, which Meredith sold to Marc Benioff and his wife Lynne in 2018.

== History ==
=== Beginnings ===
Nightly discussions about the concept of a news magazine led founders Henry Luce and Briton Hadden, both aged 23, to quit their jobs in 1922. Later that year, they formed Time Inc. Having raised $86,000 out of a $100,000 goal, they published the first issue of Time on March 3, 1923, marking the debut of the first weekly news magazine in the United States. Initially, Luce served as business manager while Hadden acted as the editor-in-chief, with the two alternating the titles of president and secretary-treasurer annually. Upon Hadden's sudden death in 1929, Luce assumed his partner's position.

=== Growth ===
Luce launched the business magazine Fortune in February 1930 and the pictorial Life magazine in 1936. He launched House & Home in 1952 and Sports Illustrated in 1954. He also produced The March of Time radio and newsreel series. By the mid-1960s, Time Inc. was the largest and most prestigious magazine publisher in the world. (Dwight Macdonald, a Fortune staffer during the 1930s, referred to him as "Il Luce", a play on the Italian dictator Benito Mussolini, who was called "Il Duce".) Once ambitious to become Secretary of State in a Republican administration, Luce wrote a famous article in Life magazine in 1941, called "The American Century", which defined the role of American foreign policy for the remainder of the 20th century, and perhaps beyond.

President Franklin D. Roosevelt, aware that most publishers were opposed to him, issued a decree in 1943 that barred all publishers and media executives from visiting combat areas; he put General George Marshall in charge of enforcement. The main target was Luce, who had long opposed FDR. Historian Alan Brinkley argues the move was "badly mistaken", for had Luce been allowed to travel, he would have been an enthusiastic cheerleader for American forces around the globe. But stranded in New York City, Luce's frustration and anger expressed themselves in hard-edged partisanship. Luce, supported by Editor T. S. Matthews, appointed Whittaker Chambers as acting Foreign News editor in 1944, despite the feuds Chambers had with reporters in the field.

In the 1950s, the Time Inc. executive Brumbaugh made presentations to the United States Post Office Department explaining how the company used a zoning system to speed the delivery of its magazines. Although the Department had initiated postal zoning in 1943, it was applied inconsistently. As cited in FYI, Time Inc.'s internal newsletter, "'Fewer than 40% of the cities were properly zoned,' he recalls. 'I went to the Post Office Department and showed them how we were making the zone system work.'" In 1963, the United States Post Office introduced ZIP codes.

Luce, who remained editor-in-chief of all his publications until 1964, maintained an influential position in the Republican Party. Holding anti-communist sentiments, he used Time to support right-wing dictatorships in the name of fighting communism. An instrumental figure behind the so-called "China Lobby", he played a large role in steering American foreign policy and popular sentiment in favor of Nationalist leader Chiang Kai-shek and his wife Soong Mei-ling, in their war against the Japanese. The Chiangs appeared on the cover of Time eleven times between 1927 and 1955.

In 1961, Time Inc. entered the book publishing business by combining the resources of its magazines to form Time Life. It later became the holding company for television and radio stations and had a film production division, Time Life Films, and a record label. In January 1968, Time Inc. acquired Boston-based Little, Brown and Company for $17 million. The publisher was later integrated into the Time Warner Book Group following its merger with Warner Books, and was then renamed Hachette Book Group following its 2006 acquisition by Hachette Livre.

Time Inc. also owned the pioneering cable network Home Box Office (HBO).

In 1974, Time Inc. launched the celebrity-focused magazine People.

In February 1985, Time Inc. announced that it would acquire the Birmingham, Alabama-based Southern Progress Corporation, publisher of the Southern Living magazine for $480 million.

In 1987, Time Inc. and Robin Wolaner launched the parent-focused magazine Parenting (Time Inc. later purchased the remaining stake in the magazine held by Wolaner on January 5, 1990, several days before the completion of the merger with Warner Communications)

=== Merger with Warner Communications and Time Warner ownership ===
In 1987, Time Inc. lost its ownership stake in the USA Network, which it held since 1981. The merger of Time Inc. and Warner Communications was announced on March 4, 1989. During the summer of that same year, Paramount Communications (formerly Gulf and Western Industries) launched a $12.2 billion hostile bid to acquire Time Inc. in an attempt to end a stock swap merger deal between Time and Warner Communications. This caused Time to raise its bid for Warner to $14.9 billion in cash and stock. Paramount responded by filing a lawsuit in a Delaware court to block the Time/Warner merger. The court ruled in Time's favor twice, forcing Paramount to drop both the Time acquisition and the lawsuit, and allowing merger of the two companies, which was completed on January 10, 1990. Effectively, Time took over Warner, resulting in a new corporate structure and the combined company being called "Time Warner" with Time remaining as its subsidiary.

In November 1990, Time Inc. announced that it would acquire the remaining stake in Hippocrates Partners (Time had previously purchased its 50% stake in July 1988).

The Pathfinder website was launched in 1994, with content from the Time, People, and Fortune magazines. It was shut down in 1999.

On October 20, 2000, Time Inc. announced that it would acquire the magazine division of Times Mirror Company that includes Field & Stream, Golf Magazine, Outdoor Life, Popular Science, Skiing and Yachting from the Tribune Company for $475 million, the merger was subsequently completed in November of that year, forming Time4Media (the magazines in the division, with the exception of Golf Magazine and the Parenting Group were sold to Bonnier Group in 2007)

In January 2005, Time Inc. announced that it would purchase the remaining stake in New York City-based Essence Communications, publisher of the Essence magazine, which it did not already own. (Time had purchased 49% stake in the magazine in 2000)

In 2008, Time Inc. launched Maghound, an internet-based magazine membership service featuring approximately 300 magazine titles from both Time Inc. brands and external publishing companies. On January 19, 2010, Time Inc. acquired StyleFeeder, a personal shopping engine.

In August 2010, Time Inc. announced that Ann S. Moore, its chairman and chief executive, would step down as CEO and be replaced by Jack Griffin, an executive with Meredith Corporation, the nation's second-largest publisher of consumer magazines. In September 2010, Time Inc. entered into a licensing agreement with Kolkata-based ABP Group, one of India's largest media conglomerates, to publish Fortune India magazine and the annual Fortune India 500 list. Griffin was ousted after a brief tenure, and was eventually replaced by Laura Lang, who served about a year.

=== Split ===
On March 6, 2013, Time Warner announced plans to spin off Time Inc. as a publicly traded company. Time Warner's chairman/CEO Jeff Bewkes said that the split would allow Time Warner to focus entirely on its television and film businesses, and Time Inc. to focus on its core print media businesses. It was announced in May 2014 that Time Inc. would become a publicly traded company on June 6 of that year. The spin-off was completed on June 9, 2014. As of September 13, 2016, Rich Battista was promoted to president and CEO, replacing Joseph A. Ripp.

Time Inc. purchased American Express Publishing Corporation's suite of titles, including Travel + Leisure, Food & Wine, Departures, Black Ink and Executive Travel on October 1, 2013. On January 14, 2014, Time Inc. announced that Colin Bodell was joining the company in the newly created position of executive vice president and chief technology officer. However, he was let go May 19, 2016. On February 5, 2014, Time Inc. announced that it was cutting 500 jobs with most of the layoffs at American Express Publishing. From April 2014 to mid-2017, the Chairman of Time Inc. was Joseph A. Ripp, who had been Chief Executive since September 2013 and continued as Executive Chairman when replaced as CEO by Battista. Though Ripp had intended to remain Executive Chairman until 2018, he wound up leaving the board in 2017 and John Fahey served as non-executive chairman for the months prior to the company's sale to Meredith. On May 28, 2015, Time Inc. announced the purchase of entertainment and sports news site FanSided. In July 2015, Time Inc. acquired League Athletics in Tucson, SportsSignup in Saratoga Springs, and iScore in Los Alamitos. The three companies will be a part of Sports Illustrated Play.

After attempting a few TV shows in 2014 and 2015, the company formed Time Inc. Productions in 2016 as its in-house production company. On February 11, 2016, Time Inc. announced that it has acquired Viant, a leading people based marketing platform and owner of MySpace.

=== Meredith and IAC purchases ===
In February 2017, it was reported that Meredith Corporation and a group of investors led by Edgar Bronfman Jr. were considering purchasing Time Inc. In 2016, Time Inc. acquired Bizrate Insights. On April 28, 2017, the company's board of directors dropped the plan of selling the company and instead focus on growth strategies.

On November 26, 2017, it was announced that Meredith Corporation would acquire Time Inc. in a $2.8 billion deal. $640 million in backing will be provided by Koch Equity Development, but the Koch family will not have a board seat or otherwise influence the company's operations. Prior to the sale closing in January 2018, Time Inc. sold Essence Communications to Richelieu Dennis, the founder of hair- and skin-care products maker Sundial Brands. In January 2018, Meredith removed signage and references to Time, Inc., and the Time, Inc. website was redirected to the Meredith's website.

In March 2018, only six weeks after the closure of the deal, Meredith announced that it would lay off 1,200 employees, and explore the sale of Time, Fortune, Money, and Sports Illustrated. The company felt that these brands did not align with its core, lifestyle-oriented properties.

Howard Milstein had announced on February 7, 2018, that he would acquire Golf Magazine from Meredith, and Time Inc. UK was sold to the British private equity group Epiris (later rebranded to TI Media) in late February. In September 2018, Meredith announced that it would re-sell Time to Marc Benioff and his wife Lynne for $190 million. Although Benioff is the chairman and co-CEO of Salesforce.com, Time will remain separate from the company, and Benioff will not be involved in its daily operations. In November 2018, Meredith announced to sell Fortune to Thai businessman Chatchaval Jiaravanon for $150 million. In December 2021, Meredith was acquired by IAC and merged with Dotdash to form Dotdash Meredith, which then changed to People Inc. in 2025; Barry Diller, the head of IAC, had previous relations with Time Inc. in the early 1980s when he was head of Paramount and helped make Time Inc. at one point a co-owner of the USA Network.

=== Offices ===
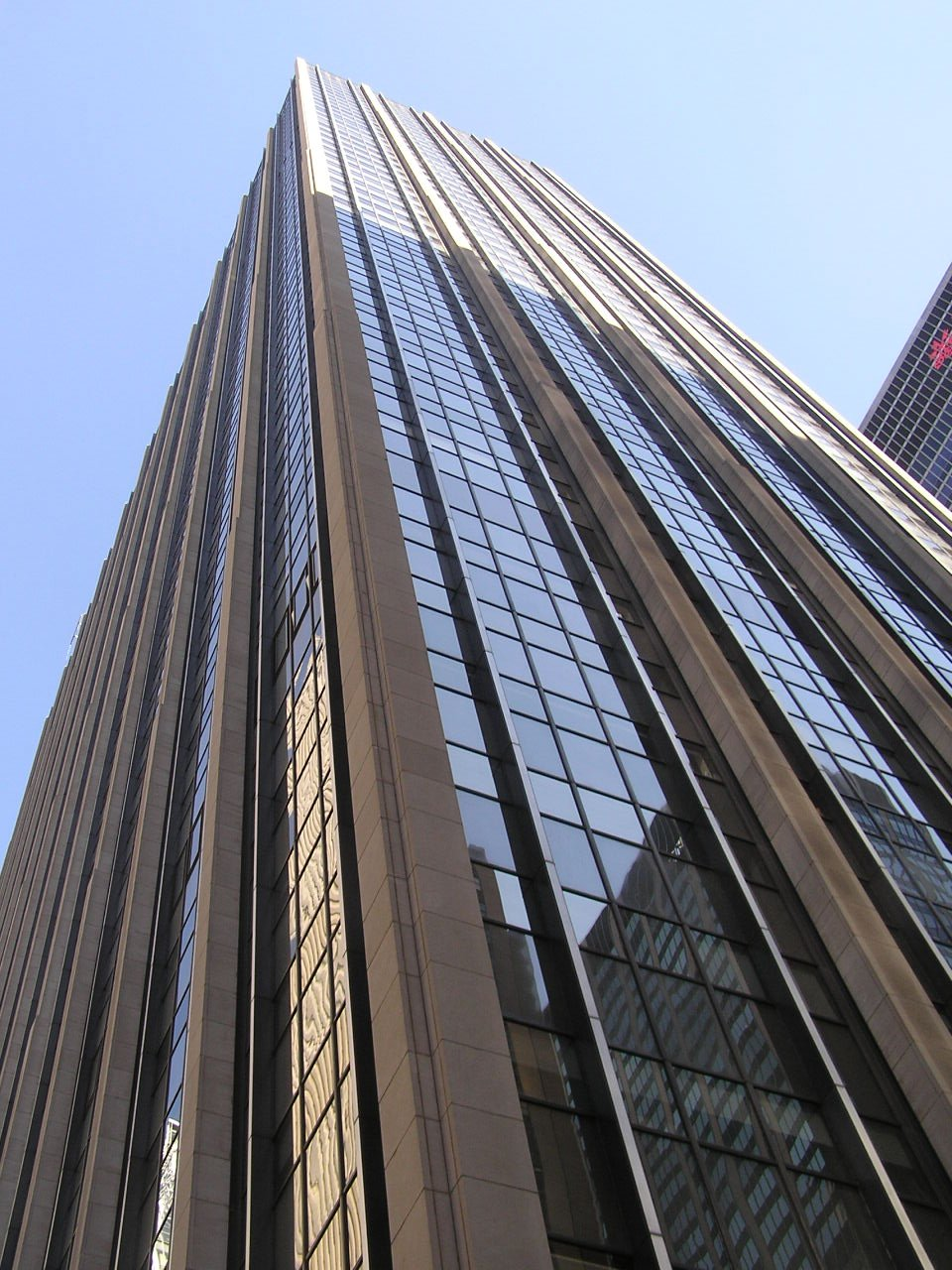
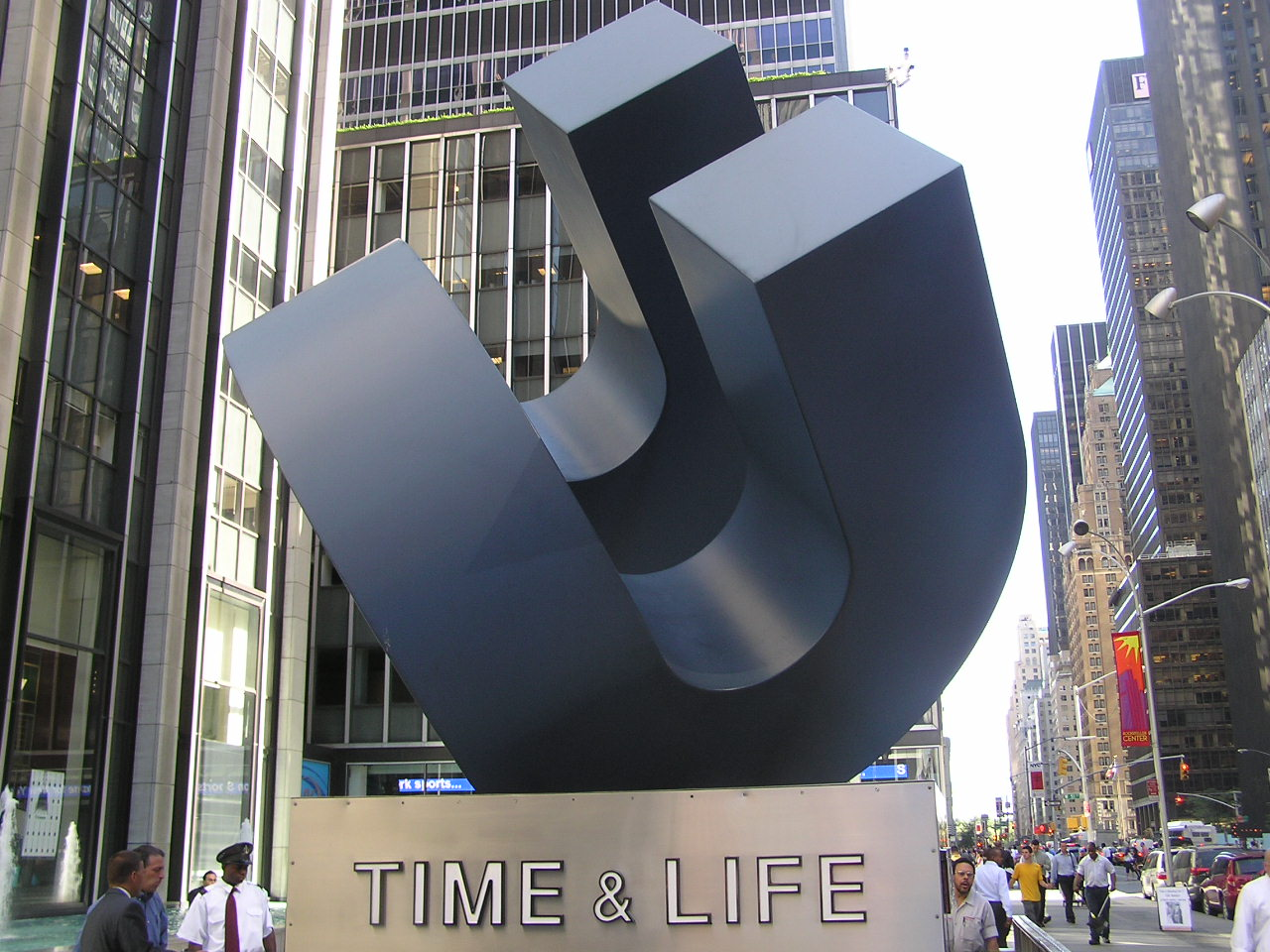
Time & Life Building on the 1271 Avenue of the Americas 1960–2014 location in New York City and the Time & Life statue in front of it.

Time's offices were originally in the Chrysler Building. In 1938, they moved to the seven upper floors of the newly built 1 Rockefeller Plaza in Rockefeller Center. In 1960, they moved to fifteen floors of a new building, also in Rockefeller Center, 1271 Avenue of the Americas. Time rented additional offices in the adjacent 135 West 50th Street building. In 2014, Time moved to Brookfield Place in lower Manhattan, where it remained until its ultimate demise four years later.

When they were being built, both the Rockefeller Plaza and Avenue of the Americas buildings were given the name "Time & Life Building" at the time after their main soon-to-be tenant, but also lost it when that tenant moved elsewhere. This incidentally, did not apply to their 153 New Bond Street, London W1Y0AA UK premises; it too was baptized "Time & Life Building" when it was built in 1951–53 as the then-European headquarters of "Time & Life International, Ltd.", but contrary to its New York City counterparts, it kept the name after the company had vacated the premises in late-August 2009.

== Leadership ==
In the early years, when the company was just Time magazine, Luce served as business manager while Hadden was editor-in-chief, and they annually alternated the positions of president and secretary-treasurer. On Hadden's sudden death in 1929 Luce took his position and business management was entrusted to Roy E. Larsen, who had been one of their first hires. Luce cultivated a philosophy of "church and state", where the editorial and business management were separate up to the board of directors level. (This was functionally ended with the departure of McManus from the Time Warner board, and formally by Ripp in 2013).

=== Editors-in-chief ===
- 1929–1964 Henry Luce (then "Editorial Chairman" to his death in 1967)
- 1964–1979 Hedley Donovan
- 1979–1987 Henry Anatole Grunwald
- 1987–1994 Jason McManus
- 1995–2005 Norman Pearlstine
- 2006–2012 John Huey
- 2013 Martha Nelson

McManus was the last editor-in-chief on the board of the parent company and was removed in 1992 following the formation of Time Warner. The position was abolished in 2013, with editors reporting directly to business group presidents.

=== Presidents ===
- Luce (alternating with Hadden to 1929) to 1939
- 1939–1960 Roy E. Larsen (then chairman executive committee to 1969, then vice chairman to shortly before his death in 1979)
- 1960–1969 James A. Linen
- 1969–1980 James R. Shepley
- 1980–1986 J. Richard Munro
- 1986–1990 Nicholas J. Nicholas Jr.

Linen became chairman of the executive committee for a time after serving as president, then was succeeded by Shepley, who retained that position for a time after he, in turn, stepped down as president.

=== Chairmen of the board ===
- 1929–1942 Henry Luce
- 1942–1960 Maurice T. Moore (husband of Luce's sister Elisabeth Luce Moore)
- 1960–1980 Andrew Heiskell
- 1980–1986 Ralph P. Davidson
- 1986–1990 J. Richard Munro

Davidson also served as chairman of the executive committee after stepping down as chairman of the board. Munro was chairman of the executive committee of Time Warner from 1990 to 1996.

=== Chief executive officers ===
- 1964?–1980 Heiskell
- 1980–1990 Munro

On the merger with Warner Communications Munro and then Nicholas were co-CEOs of Time Warner with Steve Ross until 1992 when Ross squeezed Nicholas out. Gerald M. Levin, who had come up through Time's non-publishing operations, succeeded Ross later that year and in 2002 was succeeded by Richard Parsons who had never been connected to legacy Time Inc. (his successor Jeff Bewkes, leader of the parent when Time Inc. was spun off, had like Levin come from the non-publishing operations).

=== Heads of Time within a parent ===
The Time, Inc. (the comma remained part of the formal title until the Warner merger but the company ceased to use it in 1933) corporate entity diversified out of publishing in the 1970s and 1980s, purchasing what was later spun off as Temple-Inland paper company and various broadcasting and cable television operations such as HBO and what became Time Warner Cable. As the distinction between the overall corporation and the magazine operation grew, the position that had been "Group Vice President, Magazines" or "Executive Vice President, Magazines" became president and chief executive of a "magazine group" in 1985 (under Kelso F. Sutton to 1986, and then Reginald K. Brack Jr.) and then became president and CEO of a newly incorporated subsidiary, "The Time Inc. Magazine Company" in 1988 (initially with John A. Meyers as chairman). In 1992, Time Warner reorganized so that the non-magazine parts of Time Inc. came directly under the parent and the Time Inc. name was downgraded to only include the magazine company, so the officers of the "Magazine Company" became the officers of what was now Time Inc. Later that year, CEO Brack shifted to chairman with Don Logan as president; he stepped down in favor of Logan as CEO in 1994 and chairman in 1997. Logan moved up to a group oversight position including additional Time Warner operations in 2002 (Ann S. Moore succeeding him at the magazine operation) and left the company in 2005. Leaders after Moore are noted above.

== Bibliography ==
- Brinkley, Alan (2010). The Publisher: Henry Luce and His American Century. New York: Vintage Books. pp. 302–303, 322–393. ISBN 978-0679741541.
