= Ann S. Moore =

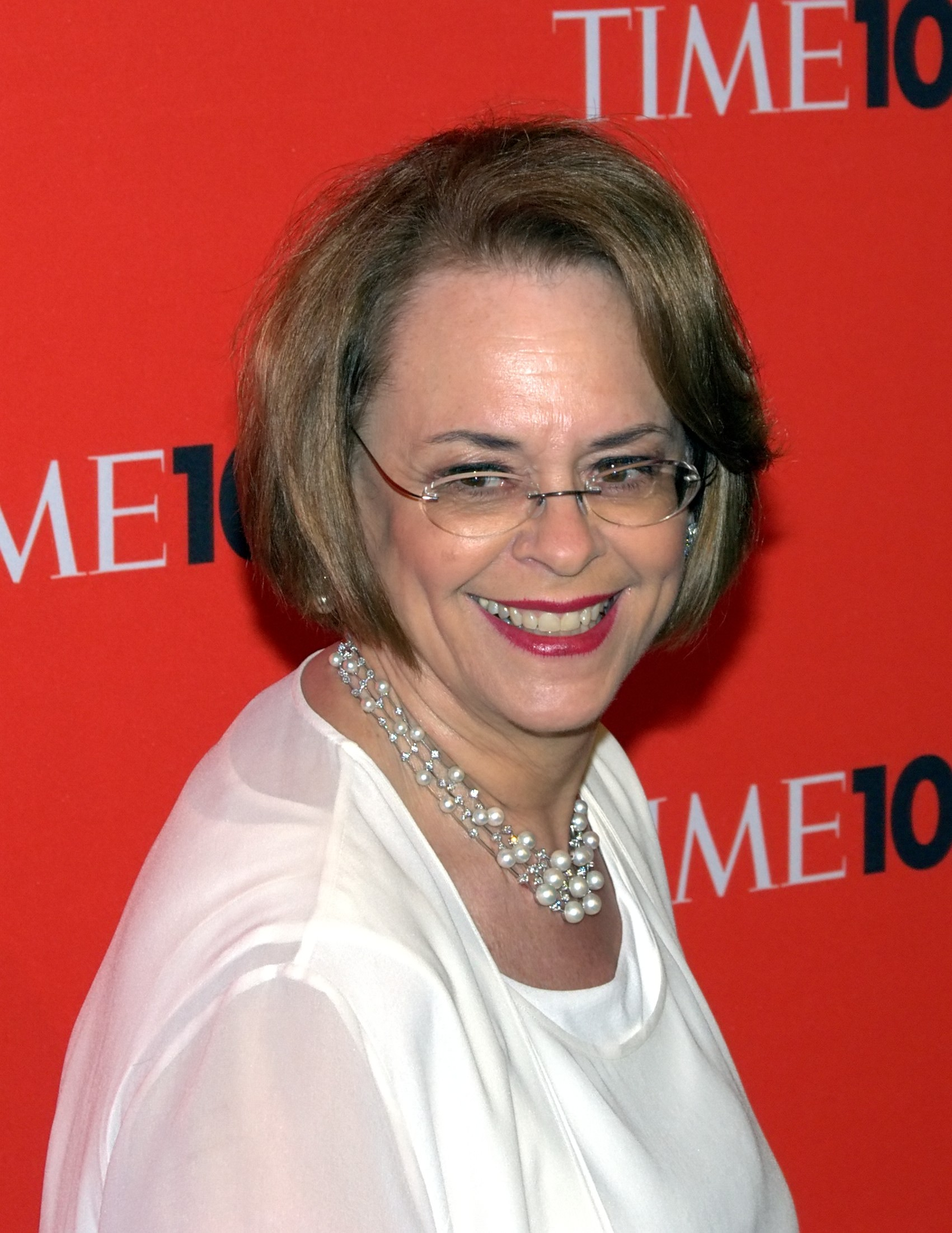
- Moore at the 2010 Time 100 Gala.
- Born: May 21, 1950 (age 76); Biloxi, MS
- Known for: Publisher of People, Chairman and CEO of Time Inc.

Ann S. Moore (born May 29, 1950) is a former chairman and chief executive officer of Time Inc. until the fall of 2010. She became the company's first female CEO when she was appointed to the position in July 2002.

== Biography ==
Moore was a 1971 graduate of Vanderbilt University, where she received a B.A. in political science, and in 1978 she received an MBA from Harvard Business School.

She began her career at Time in 1978 as a financial analyst. She became the publisher of Sports Illustrated for Kids in 1989 and publisher of People Magazine in 1991. She was named People's president in 1993. In 2001 she became vice-president of Time, Inc. She is a member of the board of directors of Avon Products, Inc. and she has been on the Fortune Magazine's 50 Most Powerful Women in American Business ten times. She also was listed among the 100 Most Powerful Women by Forbes.

=== Early life ===
In 1968, Moore graduated from McLean High School in McLean, Virginia. Then, in 1971, Moore graduated with a degree in mathematics from Vanderbilt University in Nashville and then worked in bookselling in Boston. In 1978 she graduated with an MBA from Harvard Business School, where as one of only a handful of female MBA graduates she received 13 job offers. Moore was an avid magazine reader, and her ambition was to work in magazine publishing; she consequently accepted the lowest-paid job she had been offered, that of financial analyst at Time.

In her early years at Time, Moore gained experience in circulation and marketing. An avid sports fan, her first executive role was as media manager of Sports Illustrated in 1979. Two years later she was appointed assistant circulation director of Fortune before moving on to become the circulation director of Money and then of Discover . Moore returned to Sports Illustrated as general manager in 1984, becoming the magazine's associate publisher four years later.

Moore's ability to take a Time title to new readers was first demonstrated in 1989 when she was appointed founding publisher of Sports Illustrated for Kids . Drawing upon her existing client network, Moore paved the way for the new title by preselling advertising pages. She also established an unusually close working relationship between the magazine's editorial section and its marketing and circulation divisions. The founding editor of Sports Illustrated for Kids John Papanek later praised Moore's business model in which the metaphorical "church" and "state" were integrated in a highly effective manner.

=== Expanded description ===
Moore joined Time following her MBA. Her leadership potential showed early on in her career and she flew up the corporate ladder through a succession of key positions. In 1991, Moore became publisher, and later president, of People. Here she oversaw the launches of Australian Who weekly, In Style, People en Español, and Real Simple, giving Time a competitive edge in the women's magazine arena for the first time. Later, as executive vice-president, she ran the business and development operations for consumer magazines including Time and People, while managing the company's consumer marketing division. She was nominated CEO in 2002. A major mission then was to take Time into the digital age, a project which has enjoyed increasing success. In 2007, digital traffic growth hit 72 percent; in 2008, despite an economic downturn, revenue for People.com rose 51 percent; and Time, Inc.’s US website has grown to be among the 20 largest online media properties.

=== Marriage and children ===
Daughter of Monty Sommovigo and Bea (maiden name unknown); married Donovan Moore (private wealth manager for Bessemer Trust); children: one.

== Expansion of People ==
In 1991 Moore became the publisher of People , a title appealing primarily to women, and two years later became the magazine's president. Moore believed that the very successful publication could grow larger still if marketed more specifically to readers interested in women's fashion and popular journalism. In an interview with Advertising Age in 2001 Moore referred to Time's "inability to understand you could make money marketing to women" (June 4, 2001). Until the 1990s Time published mainly financial and sporting magazines and marketed its titles almost entirely to an educated male readership.

Moore added beauty and fashion sections to People and changed its format from black-and-white to color. She also increased the proportion of advertising pages and changed the magazine's issue day from Monday to Friday so as to coincide with weekend shopping trips. Although the new direction in which Moore was taking the magazine met with a cautious response from Time senior management, her innovations proved successful. From 1991 People surpassed Time's traditional leader, Time magazine, in advertising revenue; by 2001 the gap had become considerable, with People earning $723.7 million to Time 's $666 million. In 2002 People earned one-third of Time's total revenues.

As president of People Moore established a pattern of successful magazine launches that further showed her all-around strengths in both the marketing and editorial aspects of magazine publishing. Along with spin-offs such as the Australian version of People , entitled WHO , Moore created four highly successful magazines at biyearly intervals between 1994 and 2000: In Style, People en Español, Teen People, and Real Simple.

In Style , launched in 1994, was the first magazine of its kind to include fashion, celebrity lifestyles, and shelter (interior design, architecture, and gardening) content. In Style reflected Moore's belief, expressed in a Brandweek interview in 1999, that "runway fashion didn't work and it was celebrities who were the trend spotters in America" (March 8, 1999). The new title drew cautious responses from both Moore's higherups at Time and sponsors but, as with the revamped People , was immediately successful with readers. By 2000 In Style was Time's 15th-biggest-selling title, with a circulation of 1.4 million.

In 1998 Moore was appointed president of the People group; in March 2001 she acquired responsibility for Time's Parenting group. Three months later she was appointed vice president to Time while still overseeing both the People and Parenting groups. Moore was appointed to the role of CEO and chairwoman of Time in July 2002, soon after the merger between Time Warner and AOL.

== Published works ==
Publisher of People.

Launched Sports Illustrated for Kids.

== Awards ==
Matrix Award, Women in Communications, 1994; 50 Most Powerful Women in American Business, Fortune , 1998–2003; Civic Leadership Award, AOL Time Warner, 2003.
