= 541 North Fairbanks Court =

Office skyscraper in Chicago, Illinois

Coordinates: 41.8922°N 87.6198°W

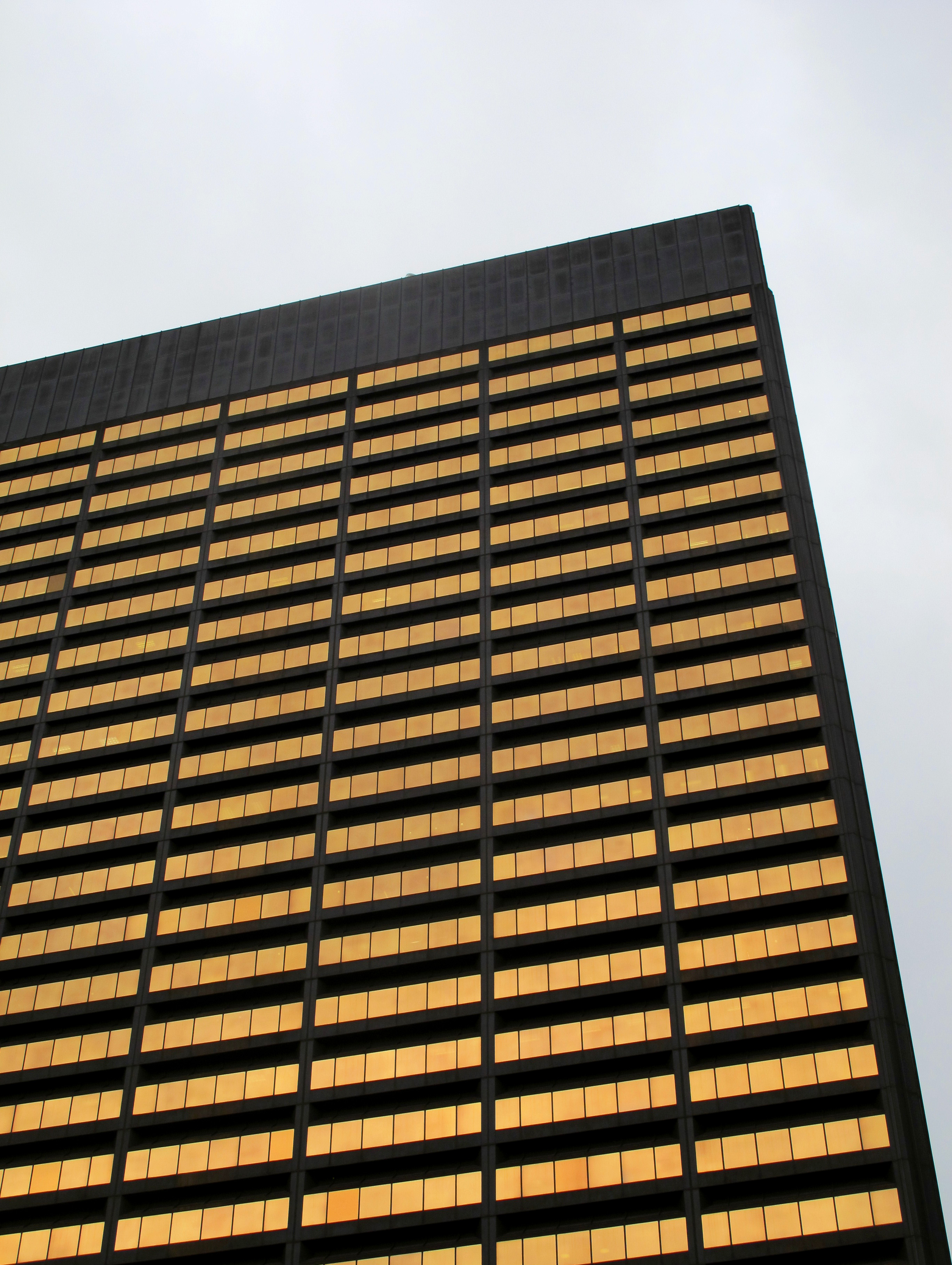
- 541 North Fairbanks Court in September 2014

General information
- Location: 541 North Fairbanks Court
- Completed: 1969

Height
- Height: 404 feet (123 m)

Technical details
- Floor count: 30

Design and construction
- Architect: Harry Weese

541 North Fairbanks Court, formerly the Time-Life Building, is a 404-foot-tall (123 m), 30-story skyscraper in Chicago, Illinois, designed by Harry Weese and completed in 1969. Located on the Near North Side, it was among the first in the U.S. to use double-deck elevators. The odd-numbered floors are accessible from the lower lobby, with even floors serviced from the upper level.

In 2014, the building was purchased by Northwestern Memorial Hospital, which already housed several back-office functions there, for $28 million (equivalent to $38.1 million in 2025).. The Chicago Park District planned to vacate floors 3 through 7, which it used as its headquarters, in 2018. It then negotiated an extension with rent of the lease while preparing a move to a new facility.

== Architecture ==
The structure is clad in Cor-Ten steel, the material used for the Daley Center and the Picasso sculpture in the Center's plaza. The metal rusts with age, an effect intended by the architects. The lobby floor is ½ level below ground, and an underground retail concourse is found another half level below. The coffered ceilings in the lobby and outdoor arcade are similar to Washington, D.C.'s subway system, designed by the same architect.

The 27-foot-high (8.2 m) lobby has a base of 87 feet (27 m) with 30-foot-wide (9.1 m) bay windows.

== Awards ==
- In 1973, the architects won an Honor Award from the American Institute of Architects.
